= Pachat =

Pachat (Persian: پاچات) may refer to:

- Pachat-e Charbiyun
- Pachat-e Delita
- Pachat-e Jowkar
- Pachat, Neka
