= Chenar Bon =

Chenar Bon or Chenarbon (Persian: چناربن) may refer to various places in Iran:

- Chenar Bon, Gilan
- Chenar Bon, Kohgiluyeh and Boyer-Ahmad
- Chenar Bon, Babol, Mazandaran Province
- Chenar Bon, Gatab, Babol County, Mazandaran Province
- Chenar Bon, Neka, Neka County, Mazandaran Province
- Chenar Bon, Hezarjarib, Neka County, Mazandaran Province
- Chenar Bon, Nowshahr, Mazandaran Province
- Chenar Bon, Sari, Mazandaran Province
- Chenarbon, Tonekabon, Mazandaran Province
