= Esmail Aqa Mahalleh =

Esmail Aqa Mahalleh اسماعيل آقا محله
- Village
- Location within Iran
- Coordinates: 36°39′21″N 53°16′52″E
- Country: Iran
- Province: Mazandaran
- County: Neka
- Bakhsh: Central
- Rural District: Qareh Toghan

Population (2006)
  - Total: 631
- Time zone: UTC+3:30 (IRST)

Esmail Aqa Mahalleh (Persian: اسماعيل آقا محله, also Romanized as Esmā‘īl Āqā Maḩalleh) is a village in Qareh Toghan Rural District, in the Central District of Neka County, Mazandaran Province, Iran. At the 2016 census, its population was 612, in 204 families. Down from 631 in 2006.

Esmail Aqa Mahalleh is located northwest of Neka city limits, near the city's railway station and Nekarud river. Agriculture is the main profession of the village's people.
