= Dowqanlu =

Dowqanlu دوقانلو
- Village
- Location within Iran
- Coordinates: 36°38′43″N 53°16′35″E
- Country: Iran
- Province: Mazandaran
- County: Neka
- Bakhsh: Central
- Rural District: Qareh Toghan

Population (2016)
  - Total: 529
- Time zone: UTC+3:30 (IRST)

Dowqanlu (Persian: دوقانلو, also Romanized as Dowqānlū; also known as Dowghānlū) is a village in Qareh Toghan Rural District, in the Central District of Neka County, Mazandaran Province, Iran. At the 2016 census, its population was 529, in 176 families. Up from 486 in 2006.

The village is located west of Neka city limits.
