= Mojtame-ye Meskuni Shahid Abbaspur =

Mojtame-ye Meskuni Shahid Abbaspur مجتمع مسكوني شهيدعباسپور
- Village
- Interactive map of Mojtame-ye Meskuni Shahid Abbaspur
- Coordinates: 36°37′15.384″N 53°15′21.9636″E
- Country: Iran
- Province: Mazandaran
- County: Neka
- Bakhsh: Central
- Rural District: Qareh Toghan

Population (2006)
  - Total: 279
- Time zone: UTC+3:30 (IRST)

Mojtame-ye Meskuni Shahid Abbaspur (Persian: مجتمع مسكوني شهيدعباسپور, also Romanized as Mojtame`-ye Meskūnī Shahīd ʿAbbāspūr) is a private residential township near the city of Neka in Mazandaran province, Iran. It borders the Mehr residential township to the west and Neka's urban area to its northeast. It was designed for the workers of Shahid Salimi Power Plant.

Administratively, it is in the Central District of Neka County. At the 2016 census, its population was 259 people, in 82 households. It was formerly in Kuhdasht-e Sharqi Rural District, in the Central District of Miandorud County, Mazandaran Province, Iran. At the 2006 census, its population was 279, in 74 families.
