= Gilabad, Mazandaran =

Gilabad گيل آباد
- Village
- Location within Iran
- Coordinates: 36°41′00″N 53°15′00″E
- Country: Iran
- Province: Mazandaran
- County: Neka
- Bakhsh: Central
- Rural District: Qareh Toghan

Population (2006)
  - Total: 195
- Time zone: UTC+3:30 (IRST)

Gilabad (Persian: گيل آباد, also Romanized as Gīlābād) is a village in Qareh Toghan Rural District, in the Central District of Neka County, Mazandaran Province, Iran, located southwest of Tazehabad-e Bostan Kheyl. At the 2016 census, its population was 181, in 58 families. Down from 195 in 2006.
