= Shit (disambiguation) =

Shit is an English-language vulgarism, literally referring to feces or defecation, but having many metaphoric uses.

Shit or The Shit may also refer to:

== Places ==
- Shit-e Kamarzard, a village in Kermanshah Province, Iran, also known as Shit
- Shit, Mazandaran, a village in Mazandaran Province, Iran
- Shit, Zanjan, a village in Zanjan Province, Iran

== Music ==
- "Shit" (song), the third single from the album Honest by American rapper Future
- "Scheiße", song from the album Born This Way by American singer Lady Gaga
- The Shit (album), unreleased studio album by hip hop duo 2nd II None
- "The Shit" (song), song on 2003 album Deuce by The D.O.C.
- "Shit", a song by Neil Cicierega from the album Mouth Moods
- "Shit", a 2021 song by Bo Burnham from the special Bo Burnham: Inside
- SHIT, or Sugar Honey Iced Tea, an album by Latto from 2024

== See also ==
- Oh Shit (disambiguation)
- Shithouse (disambiguation)
