= Lai, Iran =

Lai (Persian: لايي) in Iran may refer to:

- Lai Molla Kheyl
- Lai-ye Pasand
- Lai-ye Rudbar
