= Valashed-e Pain =

Valashed-e Pain ولاشدپائين
- Village
- Location within Iran
- Coordinates: 36°42′00″N 53°18′00″E
- Country: Iran
- Province: Mazandaran
- County: Neka
- Bakhsh: Central
- Rural District: Qareh Toghan

Population (2016)
  - Total: 196
- Time zone: UTC+3:30 (IRST)

Valashed-e Pain (Persian: ولاشدپائين, also Romanized as Valāshed-e Pā’īn) is a village in Qareh Toghan Rural District, in the Central District of Neka County, Mazandaran Province, Iran. At the 2016 census, its population was 190, in 59 families.

It is located northeast of Valashed village.
