= Now Dehak, Neka =

Village in Mazandaran province, Iran

Now Dehak Persian: نودهک
- Village
- Location within Iran
- Coordinates: 36°37′59″N 53°15′41″E
- Country: Iran
- Province: Mazandaran
- County: Neka
- District: Central
- Rural District: Qareh Toghan

Population (2016)
  - Total: 1,103
- Time zone: UTC+3:30 (IRST)
- Website: https://nowdehak.loxblog.com

Now Dehak (Persian: نودهک) is a village in Qareh Toghan Rural District of the Central District in Neka County, Mazandaran province, Iran.

The village is southwest of the city of Neka, with the Trans-Iranian Railway passing through it.

== Demographics ==
=== Population ===
At the time of the 2006 National Census, the village's population was 1,835 in 440 households. The following census in 2011 counted 1,119 people in 312 households. The 2016 census measured the population of the village as 1,103 people in 361 households.
