= Latergaz =

Latergaz (Persian: لترگاز) may refer to:

- Latergaz-e Olya
- Latergaz-e Sofla
