= Owkreka =

Owkreka اوكركا
- Village
- Location within Iran
- Coordinates: 36°34′27″N 53°26′30″E
- Country: Iran
- Province: Mazandaran
- County: Neka
- Bakhsh: Central
- Rural District: Peyrajeh

Population (2016)
  - Total: 144
- Time zone: UTC+3:30 (IRST)

Owkreka (Persian: اوكركا, also Romanized as Owkrekā and Owkarkā; also known as Okarkā) is a village in Peyrajeh Rural District, in the Central District of Neka County, Mazandaran Province, Iran.

At the time of the 2006 National Census, the village's population was 144 in 33 households. The following census in 2011 counted 141 people in 39 households. The 2016 census measured the population of the village as 144 people in 42 households.
