= Valamdeh =

Village in Mazandaran province, Iran

Valamdeh Persian: ولامده
- Village
- Location within Iran
- Coordinates: 36°27′33″N 53°40′14″E
- Country: Iran
- Province: Mazandaran
- County: Neka
- District: Hezarjarib
- Rural District: Zarem Rud

Population (2016)
  - Total: 584
- Time zone: UTC+3:30 (IRST)

Valamdeh (Persian: ولامده) (Note: Also romanized as Valāmdeh and Volāmadeh) is a village in Zarem Rud Rural District of Hezarjarib District in Neka County, Mazandaran province, Iran. It is in the Alborz (Elburz) mountain range.

== Demographics ==
=== Population ===
At the time of the 2006 National Census, the village's population was 636 in 144 households. The following census in 2011 counted 659 people in 196 households. The 2016 census measured the population of the village as 584 people in 199 households.
