= Varfam =

Varfam ورفام، ورپام
- Village
- Location within Iran
- Coordinates: 36°28′48″N 53°53′19″E
- Country: Iran
- Province: Mazandaran
- County: Neka
- Bakhsh: Hezarjarib
- Rural District: Zarem Rud

Population (2016)
  - Total: 128
- Time zone: UTC+3:30 (IRST)

Varfam (Persian: ورفام, also Romanized as Varfām; also known as Varnām and Varpām) is a village in Zarem Rud Rural District, Hezarjarib District, Neka County, Mazandaran Province, Iran. At the 2016 census, its population was 128, in 45 families. Up from 101 in 2006.
