= Chamaz Deh =

Chamaz Deh چمازده
- Village
- Location within Iran
- Coordinates: 36°28′06″N 53°40′28″E
- Country: Iran
- Province: Mazandaran
- County: Neka
- Bakhsh: Hezarjarib
- Rural District: Zarem Rud

Population (2016)
  - Total: 78
- Time zone: UTC+3:30 (IRST)

Chamaz Deh (Persian: چمازده, also Romanized as Chamāz Deh) is a village in Zarem Rud Rural District, Hezarjarib District, Neka County, Mazandaran Province, Iran, located in the Alborz (Elburz) mountain range.

At the 2016 census, its population was 78, in 26 families. Down from 86 in 2006.
