= Kordab =

Kordab كرداب
- Village
- Location within Iran
- Coordinates: 36°33′43″N 53°25′57″E
- Country: Iran
- Province: Mazandaran
- County: Neka
- Bakhsh: Hezarjarib
- Rural District: Zarem Rud

Population (2016)
  - Total: 201
- Time zone: UTC+3:30 (IRST)

Kordab (Persian: كرداب, also Romanized as Kordāb) is a village in Zarem Rud Rural District, Hezarjarib District, Neka County, Mazandaran Province, Iran. At the 2016 census, its population was 201, in 64 families.

The climate is cool dry. The average temperature is 15 °C. The warmest month is July, at 23 °C, and the coldest is January, at 5 °C. The average rainfall is 548 mm per year. The wettest month is November, with 76 mm of rain, and the driest is August, with 15 mm.
