= Suchelma =

Village in Mazandaran province, Iran

Suchelma Persian: سوچلما
- Village
- Location within Iran
- Coordinates: 36°25′18″N 53°34′20″E
- Country: Iran
- Province: Mazandaran
- County: Neka
- District: Hezarjarib
- Rural District: Estakhr-e Posht

Population (2016)
  - Total: 609
- Time zone: UTC+3:30 (IRST)

Suchelma (Persian: سوچلما) (Note: Also romanized as Sūchelmā) is a village in Estakhr-e Posht Rural District of Hezarjarib District in Neka County, Mazandaran province, Iran.

== Demographics ==
=== Population ===
At the time of the 2006 National Census, the village's population was 519 in 139 households. The following census in 2011 counted 633 people in 182 households. The 2016 census measured the population of the village as 609 people in 201 households.
