= Saram, Mazandaran =

Saram سارم
- Village
- Location within Iran
- Coordinates: 36°28′29″N 53°28′56″E
- Country: Iran
- Province: Mazandaran
- County: Neka
- Bakhsh: Hezarjarib
- Rural District: Estakhr-e Posht

Population (2016)
  - Total: 188
- Time zone: UTC+3:30 (IRST)

Saram (Persian: سارم, also romanized as Sāram) is a village in Estakhr-e Posht Rural District, Hezarjarib District, Neka County, Mazandaran Province, Iran. At the 2006 census, its population was 188, in 58 families. Up from 108 people in 2006.
