= Esmail Mahalleh =

Village in Mazandaran province, Iran

Esmail Mahalleh Persian: اسماعيل محله
- Village
- Location within Iran
- Coordinates: 36°24′46″N 53°38′18″E
- Country: Iran
- Province: Mazandaran
- County: Neka
- District: Hezarjarib
- Rural District: Estakhr-e Posht

Population (2016)
  - Total: 240
- Time zone: UTC+3:30 (IRST)

Esmail Mahalleh (Persian: اسماعيل محله) (Note: Also romanized as Esmā‘īl Maḩalleh) is a village in Estakhr-e Posht Rural District of Hezarjarib District in Neka County, Mazandaran province, Iran.

== Demographics ==
=== Population ===
At the time of the 2006 National Census, the village's population was 291 in 72 households. The following census in 2011 counted 271 people in 80 households. The 2016 census measured the population of the village as 240 people in 82 households.
