= Dowr Ab =

Dowr Ab دوراب
- Village
- Location within Iran
- Coordinates: 36°40′48″N 53°20′26″E
- Country: Iran
- Province: Mazandaran
- County: Neka
- Bakhsh: Central
- Rural District: Mehravan

Population (2016)
  - Total: 438
- Time zone: UTC+3:30 (IRST)

Dowr Ab (Persian: دوراب, also Romanized as Dowr Āb) is a village in Mehravan Rural District, in the Central District of Neka County, Mazandaran Province, Iran. At the 2016 census, its population was 438, in 125 families. Up from 410 in 2006.
