= Gol Chal Sar =

Gol Chal Sar گل چال سر
- Village
- Location within Iran
- Coordinates: 36°42′30″N 53°20′11″E
- Country: Iran
- Province: Mazandaran
- County: Neka
- Bakhsh: Central
- Rural District: Mehravan

Population (2016)
  - Total: 176
- Time zone: UTC+3:30 (IRST)

Gol Chal Sar (Persian: گل چال سر, also Romanized as Gol Chāl Sar; also known as Kalleh Chāleh Sar) is a village in Mehravan Rural District, in the Central District of Neka County, Mazandaran Province, Iran. At the 2016 census, its population was 176, in 63 families. Up from 169 in 2006.
