= Ajand =

Ajand آجند
- Village
- Location within Iran
- Coordinates: 36°43′35″N 53°20′32″E
- Country: Iran
- Province: Mazandaran
- County: Neka
- Bakhsh: Central
- Rural District: Mehravan

Population (2016)
  - Total: 85
- Time zone: UTC+3:30 (IRST)

Ajand (Persian: آجند, also Romanized as Ājand; also known as Ājan and Ājand Chūpān Boneh) is a village in Mehravan Rural District, in the Central District of Neka County, Mazandaran Province, Iran. At the 2006 census, its population was 85, in 29 families. Down from 97 in 2006.
