= Zarandin =

Zarandin (Persian: زرندين) may refer to:

- Zarandin-e Olya
- Zarandin-e Sofla
