= Estakhr-e Posht =

Village in Mazandaran province, Iran

Estakhr-e Posht Persian: استخر پشت
- Village
- Location within Iran
- Coordinates: 36°28′14″N 53°28′15″E
- Country: Iran
- Province: Mazandaran
- County: Neka
- District: Hezarjarib
- Rural District: Estakhr-e Posht

Population (2016)
  - Total: 668
- Time zone: UTC+3:30 (IRST)

Estakhr-e Posht (Persian: استخرپشت) (Note: Also romanized as Estakhr-e Posht; also known as Esţalkh Posht) is a village in, and the capital of, Estakhr-e Posht Rural District in Hezarjarib District of Neka County, Mazandaran, Iran.

== Demographics ==
=== Population ===
At the time of the 2006 National Census, the village's population was 529 in 134 households. The following census in 2011 counted 889 people in 203 households. The 2016 census measured the population of the village as 668 people in 187 households.
