= Lakterashan =

Lakterashan or Lak Tarashan (Persian: لاك تراشان) may refer to:

- Lak Tarashan, Neka
- Lakterashan, Tonekabon
