= Seh Kileh =

Village in Mazandaran province, Iran

Seh Kileh Persian: سه كيله
- Village
- Location within Iran
- Coordinates: 36°34′57″N 53°25′15″E
- Country: Iran
- Province: Mazandaran
- County: Neka
- District: Central
- Rural District: Peyrajeh

Population (2016)
  - Total: 450
- Time zone: UTC+3:30 (IRST)

Seh Kileh (Persian: سه كيله) (Note: Also romanized as Seh Keyleh, Seh Kīlah, and Seh Kīleh; also known as Seh Kheileh) is a village in Peyrajeh Rural District of the Central District in Neka County, Mazandaran province, Iran.

== Demographics ==
=== Population ===
At the time of the 2006 National Census, the village's population was 349 in 85 households. The following census in 2011 counted 705 people in 216 households. The 2016 census measured the population of the village as 450 people in 131 households.
