= Komishan =

Village in Mazandaran province, Iran

Komishan Persian: كميشان
- Village
- Location within Iran
- Coordinates: 36°40′09″N 53°21′12″E
- Country: Iran
- Province: Mazandaran
- County: Neka
- District: Central
- Rural District: Mehravan

Population (2016)
  - Total: 1,450
- Time zone: UTC+3:30 (IRST)

Komishan (Persian: كميشان) (Note: Also romanized as Komīshān) is a village in Mehravan Rural District of the Central District in Neka County, Mazandaran province, Iran.

== Demographics ==
=== Population ===
At the time of the 2006 National Census, the village's population was 1,602 in 394 households. The following census in 2011 counted 1,530 people in 444 households. The 2016 census measured the population of the village as 1,450 people in 470 households.
