= Band-e Beni =

Band-e Beni بندبنی
- Village
- Location within Iran
- Coordinates: 36°31′35″N 53°33′02″E
- Country: Iran
- Province: Mazandaran
- County: Neka
- Bakhsh: Central
- Rural District: Peyrajeh

Population (2016)
  - Total: 107
- Time zone: UTC+3:30 (IRST)

Band-e Beni (Persian: بندبنی, also Romanized as Band-e Benī and Band Bonī) is a village in Peyrajeh Rural District, in the Central District of Neka County, Mazandaran Province, Iran.

At the time of the 2006 National Census, the village's population was 116 in 29 households. The following census in 2011 counted 148 people in 46 households. The 2016 census measured the population of the village as 107 people in 31 households.
