= Atrab =

Village in Mazandaran province, Iran

Atrab Persian: اطرب
- Village
- Location within Iran
- Coordinates: 36°42′53″N 53°19′20″E
- Country: Iran
- Province: Mazandaran
- County: Neka
- District: Central
- Rural District: Qareh Toghan

Population (2016)
  - Total: 1,558
- Time zone: UTC+3:30 (IRST)

Atrab (Persian: اطرب) (Note: Also romanized as Aţrab) is a village in Qareh Toghan Rural District of the Central District in Neka County, Mazandaran province, Iran.

== Demographics ==
=== Population ===
At the time of the 2006 National Census, the village's population was 1,490 in 393 households. The following census in 2011 counted 1,490 people in 458 households. The 2016 census measured the population of the village as 1,558 people in 474 households.
