= Ivim =

Ivim / Īvīm ايويم
- village
- Location within Iran
- Coordinates: 36°28′00″N 53°30′00″E
- Country: Iran
- Province: Mazandaran
- County: Neka
- Bakhsh: Hezarjarib
- Rural District: Estakhr-e Posht

Population (2006)
  - Total: 40
- Time zone: UTC+3:30 (IRST)

Ivim or Īvīm (Persian: ايويم ; also known as Hayavī and Hayavīm) is a village in Estakhr-e Posht Rural District, Hezarjarib District, Neka County, Mazandaran Province, Iran. At the 2016 census, its population was 52, in 18 families. Up from 40 in 2006.
