= Surak, Neka =

Surak سورک
- Village
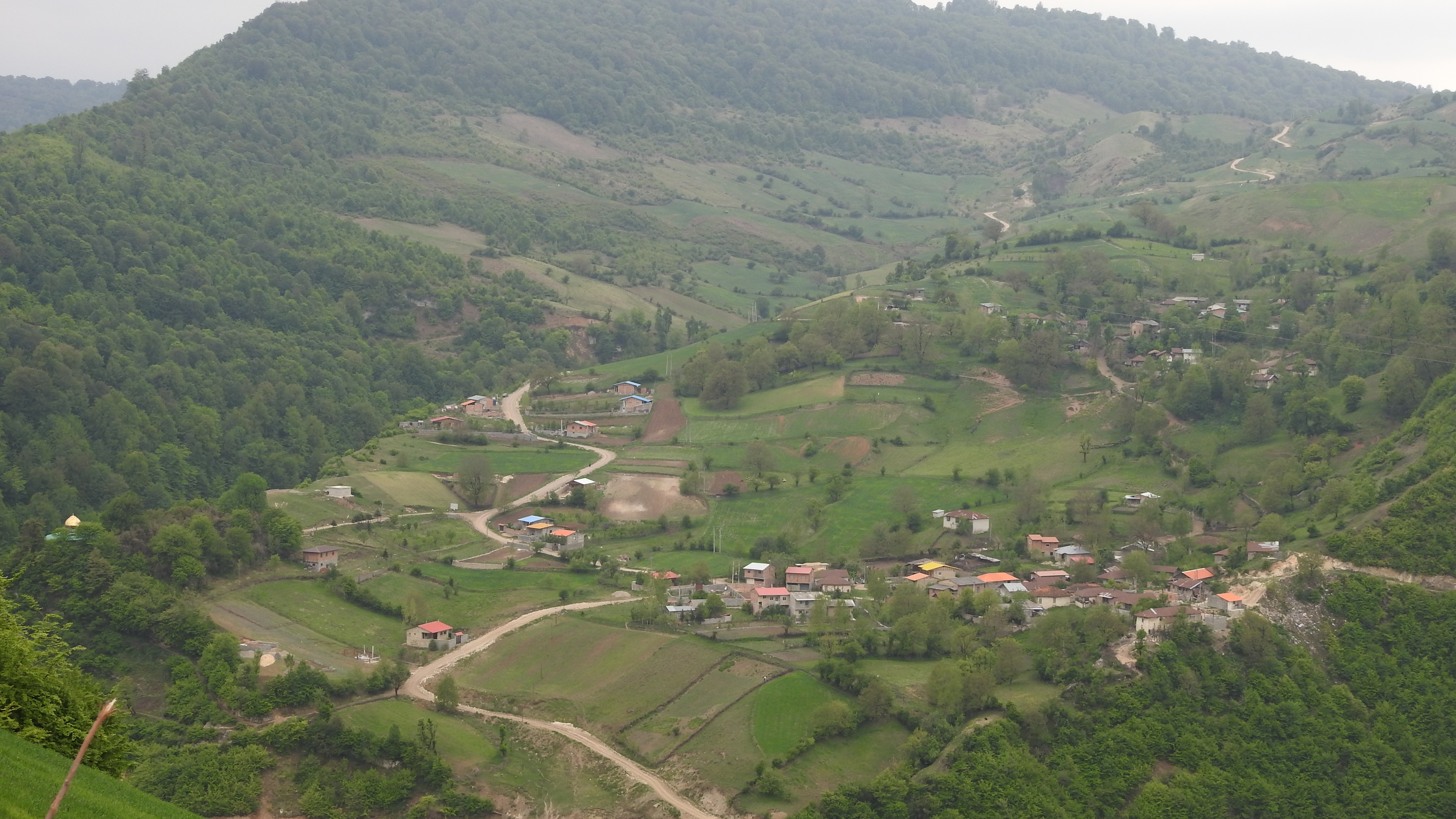

- Location within Iran
- Coordinates: 36°31′58″N 53°43′07″E
- Country: Iran
- Province: Mazandaran
- County: Neka
- Bakhsh: Hezarjarib
- Rural District: Zarem Rud

Population (2016)
  - Total: 46
- Time zone: UTC+3:30 (IRST)

Surak (Persian: سورک, also Romanized as Sūrak) is a village in Zarem Rud Rural District, Hezarjarib District, Neka County, Mazandaran Province, Iran. At the 2016 census, its population was 46, in 17 families.
