= Zerum =

Zerum زروم
- Village
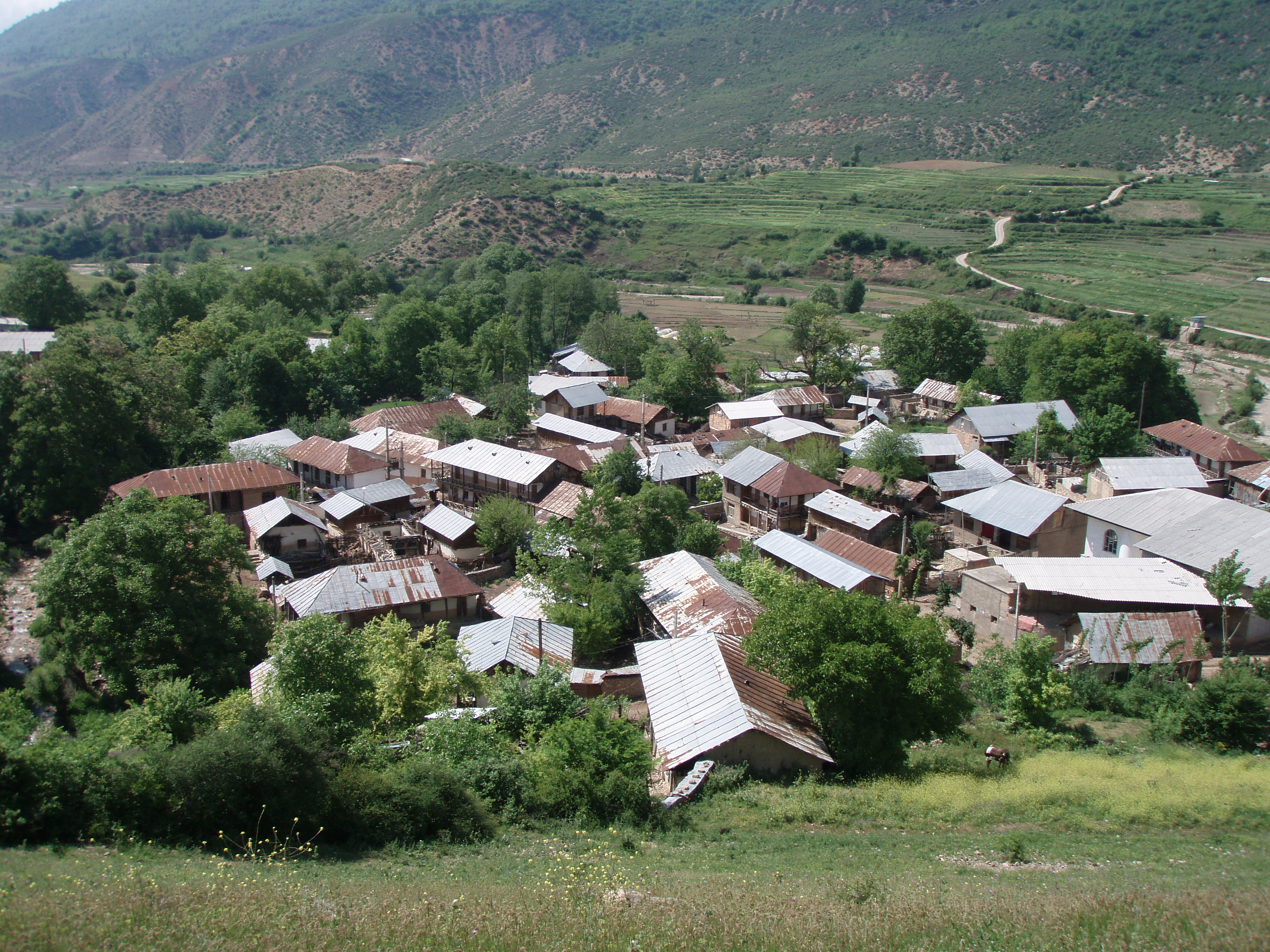

- Location within Iran
- Coordinates: 36°26′20″N 53°45′56″E
- Country: Iran
- Province: Mazandaran
- County: Neka
- Bakhsh: Hezarjarib
- Rural District: Zarem Rud

Population (2016)
  - Total: 144
- Time zone: UTC+3:30 (IRST)

Zerum (Persian: زروم, also Romanized as Zerūm; also known as Zerem) is a village in Zarem Rud Rural District, Hezarjarib District, Neka County, Mazandaran Province, Iran. At the 2016 census, its population was 144, in 45 families.
