= Hoseynabad, Estakhr-e Posht =

Hoseynabad حسين اباد
- Village
- Location within Iran
- Coordinates: 36°27′38″N 53°28′09″E
- Country: Iran
- Province: Mazandaran
- County: Neka
- Bakhsh: Hezarjarib
- Rural District: Estakhr-e Posht

Population (2016)
  - Total: 107
- Time zone: UTC+3:30 (IRST)

Hoseynabad (Persian: حسين اباد, also Romanized as Ḩoseynābād) is a village in Estakhr-e Posht Rural District, Hezarjarib District, Neka County, Mazandaran Province, Iran.

At the 2016 census, its population was 107, across 33 families. Up from 88 people in 2006.
