= Ramadan Kheyl =

Ramadan Kheyl رمدان خيل
- Village
- Location within Iran
- Coordinates: 36°32′18″N 53°35′27″E
- Country: Iran
- Province: Mazandaran
- County: Neka
- Bakhsh: Central
- Rural District: Peyrajeh

Population (2016)
  - Total: 110
- Time zone: UTC+3:30 (IRST)

Ramadan Kheyl (Persian: رمدان خيل, also Romanized as Ramadān Kheyl) is a village in Peyrajeh Rural District, in the Central District of Neka County, Mazandaran Province, Iran.

At the time of the 2006 National Census, the village's population was 115 in 29 households. The following census in 2011 counted 157 people in 50 households. The 2016 census measured the population of the village as 110 people in 43 households.
