= Kheyrabad, Mazandaran =

Kheyrabad خیر آباد
- Village
- Location within Iran
- Coordinates: 36°34′00″N 53°21′00″E
- Country: Iran
- Province: Mazandaran
- County: Neka
- Bakhsh: Hezarjarib
- Rural District: Zarem Rud

Population (2016)
  - Total: 156
- Time zone: UTC+3:30 (IRST)

Kheyrabad (Persian: خيرآباد, also Romanized as Kheyrābād) is a village in Zarem Rud Rural District, Hezarjarib District, Neka County, Mazandaran Province, Iran. At the 2016 census, its population was 156, in 54 families. Down from 191 people in 2006.
