= Rudbar Mahalleh =

Rudbar Mahalleh رودبارمحله
- Village
- Location within Iran
- Coordinates: 36°24′11″N 53°39′25″E
- Country: Iran
- Province: Mazandaran
- County: Neka
- Bakhsh: Hezarjarib
- Rural District: Estakhr-e Posht

Population (2016)
  - Total: 29
- Time zone: UTC+3:30 (IRST)

Rudbar Mahalleh (Persian: رودبارمحله, also Romanized as Rūdbār Maḩalleh) is a village in Estakhr-e Posht Rural District, Hezarjarib District, Neka County, Mazandaran Province, Iran. At the 2006 census, its population was 29, in 12 families. Up from 24 in 2006.
