= Kar Kam =

Kar Kam کارکم
- Village
- Location within Iran
- Coordinates: 36°34′30″N 53°36′31″E
- Country: Iran
- Province: Mazandaran
- County: Neka
- Bakhsh: Central
- Rural District: Peyrajeh

Population (2016)
  - Total: 246
- Time zone: UTC+3:30 (IRST)

Kar Kam (Persian: کارکم, also Romanized as Kār Kam) is a village in Peyrajeh Rural District, in the Central District of Neka County, Mazandaran Province, Iran.

At the time of the 2006 National Census, the village's population was 344 in 95 households. The following census in 2011 counted 337 people in 108 households. The 2016 census measured the population of the village as 246 people in 100 households.
