= Gelvard =

Gelvard (Persian: گلورد), also rendered as Gilavard, may refer to:

- Gelvard-e Bozorg
- Gelvard-e Kuchek
