= Dar Mazar =

Dar Mazar or Dar-e Mazar or Darmezar (Persian: درمزار) may refer to:

- Dar Mazar, Kerman
- Dar Mazar, Mazandaran
