= Seyyed Kheyl =

Seyyed Kheyl سيدخيل
- Village
- Location within Iran
- Coordinates: 36°25′22″N 53°43′15″E
- Country: Iran
- Province: Mazandaran
- County: Neka
- Bakhsh: Hezarjarib
- Rural District: Zarem Rud

Population (2016)
  - Total: 138
- Time zone: UTC+3:30 (IRST)

Seyyed Kheyl (Persian: سيدخيل, also Romanized as Seyyed Khīl) is a village in Zarem Rud Rural District, Hezarjarib District, Neka County, Mazandaran Province, Iran. At the 2016 census, its population was 138, in 48 families. Down from 145 in 2006.
