= Yaqub Mahalleh =

Yaqub Mahalleh يعقوب محله
- Village
- Location within Iran
- Coordinates: 36°34′07″N 53°32′05″E
- Country: Iran
- Province: Mazandaran
- County: Neka
- Bakhsh: Central
- Rural District: Peyrajeh

Population (2016)
  - Total: 80
- Time zone: UTC+3:30 (IRST)

Yaqub Mahalleh (Persian: يعقوب محله, also Romanized as Ya‘qūb Maḩalleh) is a village in Peyrajeh Rural District, in the Central District of Neka County, Mazandaran Province, Iran.

At the time of the 2006 National Census, the village's population was 48 in 18 households. The following census in 2011 counted 143 people in 44 households. The 2016 census measured the population of the village as 80 people in 38 households.
