= Khorram Chammaz =

Khorram Chammaz خرم چماز
- Village
- Location within Iran
- Coordinates: 36°32′19″N 53°31′59″E
- Country: Iran
- Province: Mazandaran
- County: Neka
- Bakhsh: Central
- Rural District: Peyrajeh

Population (2016)
  - Total: 181
- Time zone: UTC+3:30 (IRST)

Khorram Chammaz (Persian: خرم چماز, also Romanized as Khorram Chammāz and Khorram Chamāz) is a village in Peyrajeh Rural District, in the Central District of Neka County, Mazandaran Province, Iran.

At the time of the 2006 National Census, the village's population was 141 in 51 households. The following census in 2011 counted 237 people in 71 households. The 2016 census measured the population of the village as 181 people in 63 households.
