= Valadimeh =

Valadimeh ولاديمه
- Village
- Location within Iran
- Coordinates: 36°28′52″N 53°41′46″E
- Country: Iran
- Province: Mazandaran
- County: Neka
- Bakhsh: Hezarjarib
- Rural District: Zarem Rud

Population (2006)
  - Total: 193
- Time zone: UTC+3:30 (IRST)

Valadimeh (Persian: ولاديمه, also Romanized as Valādīmeh; also known as Valūdī) is a village in Zarem Rud Rural District, Hezarjarib District, Neka County, Mazandaran Province, Iran, located in the Alborz (Elburz) mountain range.

At the 2016 census, its population was 116, in 37 families. Decreased from 193 people in 2006.
