= Sangar, Neka =

Sangar سنگر
- Village
- Location within Iran
- Coordinates: 36°24′03″N 53°36′29″E
- Country: Iran
- Province: Mazandaran
- County: Neka
- Bakhsh: Hezarjarib
- Rural District: Estakhr-e Posht

Population (2016)
  - Total: 36
- Time zone: UTC+3:30 (IRST)

Sangar (Persian: سنگر) is a village in Estakhr-e Posht Rural District, Hezarjarib District, Neka County, Mazandaran Province, Iran. At the 2016 census, its population was 36, in 12 families. Down from 56 people in 2006.
