= Purva, Iran =

Village in Mazandaran province, Iran

Purva Persian: پوروا
- Village
- Location within Iran
- Coordinates: 36°31′01″N 53°30′07″E
- Country: Iran
- Province: Mazandaran
- County: Neka
- District: Hezarjarib
- Rural District: Zarem Rud

Population (2016)
  - Total: 514
- Time zone: UTC+3:30 (IRST)

Purva (Persian: پوروا) (Note: Also romanized as Pūravā and Pūrvā; also known as Pūrā) is a village in Zarem Rud Rural District of Hezarjarib District in Neka County, Mazandaran province, Iran.

== Demographics ==
=== Population ===
At the time of the 2006 National Census, the village's population was 415 in 114 households. The following census in 2011 counted 547 people in 166 households. The 2016 census measured the population of the village as 514 people in 145 households.
