= Shur Ab Sar =

Shur Ab Sar شوراب سر
- Village
- Location within Iran
- Coordinates: 36°40′35″N 53°21′07″E
- Country: Iran
- Province: Mazandaran
- County: Neka
- Bakhsh: Central
- Rural District: Mehravan

Population (2016)
  - Total: 220
- Time zone: UTC+3:30 (IRST)

Shur Ab Sar (Persian: شوراب سر, also Romanized as Shūr Āb Sar; also known as Shūr Āb) is a village in Mehravan Rural District, in the Central District of Neka County, Mazandaran Province, Iran. At the 2016 census, its population was 220, in 75 families. Up from 216 in 2006.
