= Chalu Pol =

Village in Mazandaran province, Iran

Chalu Pol Persian: چالوپل
- Village
- Location within Iran
- Coordinates: 36°39′22″N 53°19′18″E
- Country: Iran
- Province: Mazandaran
- County: Neka
- District: Central
- Rural District: Mehravan

Population (2016)
  - Total: 2,110
- Time zone: UTC+3:30 (IRST)

Chalu Pol (Persian: چالوپل) (Note: Also romanized as Chālū Pol; also known as Chalapur, Chāleh Pol, and Chalvil) is a village in Mehravan Rural District of the Central District in Neka County, Mazandaran province, Iran.

== Demographics ==
=== Population ===
At the time of the 2006 National Census, the village's population was 1,678 in 417 households. The following census in 2011 counted 2,129 people in 589 households. The 2016 census measured the population of the village as 2,110 people in 673 households, the most populous in its rural district.
