= Hajji Mahalleh =

Hajji Mahalleh حاجی محلّه
- Village
- Location within Iran
- Coordinates: 36°39′45″N 53°15′06″E
- Country: Iran
- Province: Mazandaran
- County: Neka
- Bakhsh: Central
- Rural District: Qareh Toghan

Population (2006)
  - Total: 921
- Time zone: UTC+3:30 (IRST)

Hajji Mahalleh (Persian: حاجی محلّه, also Romanized as Ḩājjī Maḩalleh) is a village in Qareh Toghan Rural District, in the Central District of Neka County, Mazandaran Province, Iran. At the 2016 census, its population was 854, in 264 families. Down from 921 people in 2006.
