= Darzi Kola, Neka =

Darzi Kola درزی کلا
- Village
- Location within Iran
- Coordinates: 36°28′41″N 53°31′07″E
- Country: Iran
- Province: Mazandaran
- County: Neka
- Bakhsh: Hezarjarib
- Rural District: Estakhr-e Posht

Population (2016)
  - Total: 87
- Time zone: UTC+3:30 (IRST)

Darzi Kola (Persian: درزی کلا, also Romanized as Darzī Kolā; also known as Darzī Kūlā) is a village in Estakhr-e Posht Rural District, Hezarjarib District, Neka County, Mazandaran Province, Iran. At the 2006 census, its population was 122, in 24 families. In 2016, it had 87 people in 30 households.
