= Kola Rudbar =

Village in Mazandaran province, Iran

Kola Rudbar Persian: كلارودبار
- Village
- Location within Iran
- Coordinates: 36°28′41″N 53°36′47″E
- Country: Iran
- Province: Mazandaran
- County: Neka
- District: Hezarjarib
- Rural District: Zarem Rud

Population (2016)
  - Total: 279
- Time zone: UTC+3:30 (IRST)

Kola Rudbar (Persian: كلارودبار) (Note: Also romanized as Kalā Rūdbār and Kolā Rūdbār) is a village in Zarem Rud Rural District of Hezarjarib District in Neka County, Mazandaran province, Iran.

== Demographics ==
=== Population ===
At the time of the 2006 National Census, the village's population was 229 in 56 households. The following census in 2011 counted 260 people in 72 households. The 2016 census measured the population of the village as 279 people in 88 households.
