= Shahab ol Din, Mazandaran =

Shahab ol Din شهاب الدين
- Village
- Location within Iran
- Coordinates: 36°42′08″N 53°17′51″E
- Country: Iran
- Province: Mazandaran
- County: Neka
- Bakhsh: Central
- Rural District: Qareh Toghan

Population (2016)
  - Total: 743
- Time zone: UTC+3:30 (IRST)

Shahab ol Din (Persian: شهاب الدين, also Romanized as Shahāb ol Dīn, Shahāb ed Dīn and Shahāb od Dīn) is a village in Qareh Toghan Rural District, in the Central District of Neka County, Mazandaran Province, Iran. At the 2016 census, its population was 743, in 217 families. Increased from 576 people in 2006.
