= Tazehabad Kola =

Village in Mazandaran province, Iran

Tazehabad Kola Persian: تازه ابادكلا
- Village
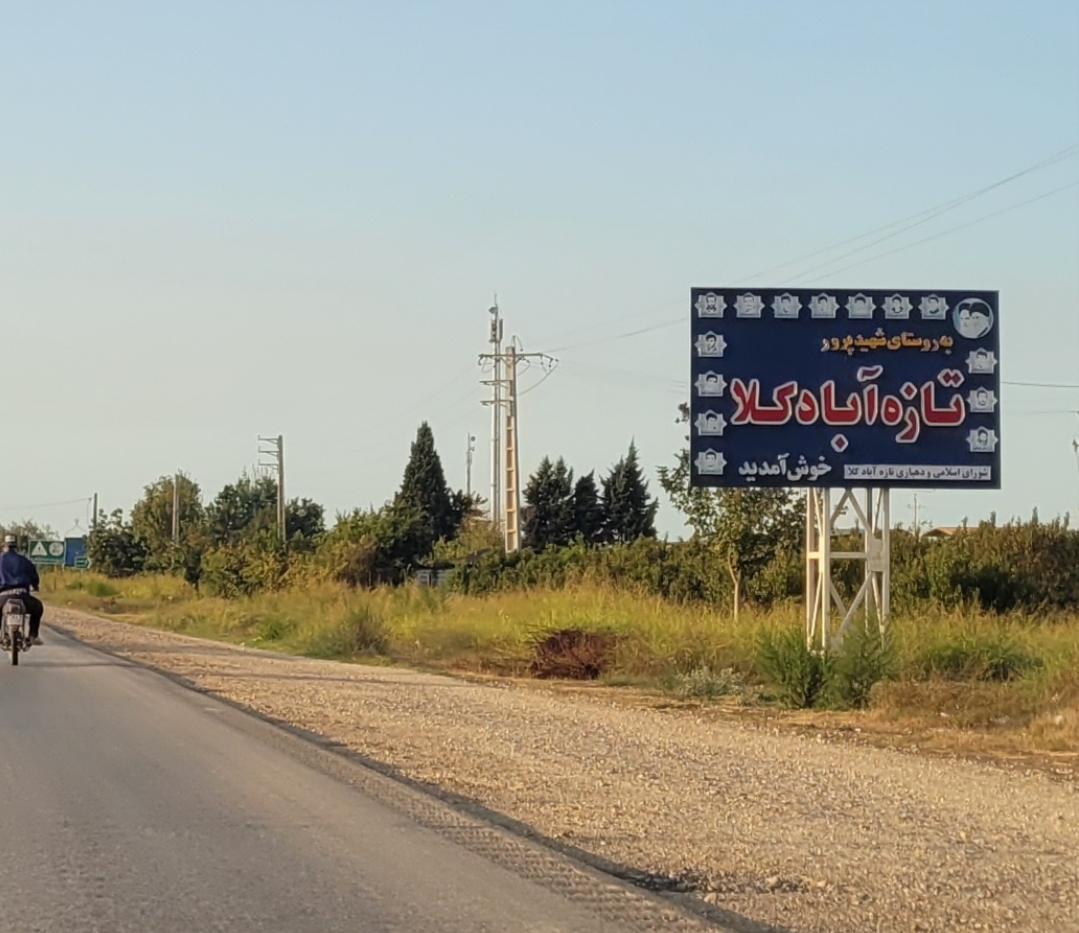
- Entry signage for the village of Tazehabad Kola

- Location within Iran
- Coordinates: 36°46′24″N 53°16′21″E
- Country: Iran
- Province: Mazandaran
- County: Neka
- District: Central
- Rural District: Qareh Toghan

Population (2016)
  - Total: 1,807
- Time zone: UTC+3:30 (IRST)

Tazehabad Kola (Persian: تازه ابادكلا) (Note: Also romanized as Tāzehābād Kolā; also known as Tāzehābād) is a village in Qareh Toghan Rural District of the Central District in Neka County, Mazandaran province, Iran.

The main clans of the village are originally from Hezarjarib Kola: Sadeqi, Esfandiari, Kaftari, Esbuchin, Zargari, mahboob tusi, Kouhzad, Ghazanfari; from Zangat Olya: Dindar; from Nodeh: Nodehi; as well as other groups such as Nazari, Abesi, and Tazemansh.

== Demographics ==
=== Language and ethnicity ===
The people of Tazehabad Kola speak the Tabari (Mazanderani) language, specifically the Neka dialect, and are of Tabari ethnicity.

=== Population ===
Historical population
Year	Pop.	±%
2006	1,916	—
2011	1,908	−0.4%
2016	1,807	−5.3%
Statistical Center of Iran

At the time of the 2006 National Census, the village's population was 1,916 in 503 households. The following census in 2011 counted 1,908 people in 573 households. The 2016 census measured the population of the village as 1,807 people in 600 households.
