= Akerd =

Village in Mazandaran province, Iran

Akerd Persian: آکرد
- Village
- Location within Iran
- Coordinates: 36°25′57″N 53°41′31″E
- Country: Iran
- Province: Mazandaran
- County: Neka
- District: Hezarjarib
- Rural District: Zarem Rud

Population (2016)
  - Total: 300
- Time zone: UTC+3:30 (IRST)

Akerd (Persian: آکرد) (Note: Also romanized as Ākerd, or Ākērd) is a village in Zarem Rud Rural District of Hezarjarib District in Neka County, Mazandaran province, Iran.

== Demographics ==
=== Population ===
At the time of the 2006 National Census, the village's population was 372 in 72 households. The following census in 2011 counted 322 people in 102 households. The 2016 census measured the population of the village as 300 people in 104 households.
