= Gol Bestan =

Village in Mazandaran province, Iran

Gol Bestan Persian: گلبستان
- Village
- Location within Iran
- Coordinates: 36°38′22″N 53°18′38″E
- Country: Iran
- Province: Mazandaran
- County: Neka
- District: Central
- Rural District: Peyrajeh

Population (2016)
  - Total: 3,114
- Time zone: UTC+3:30 (IRST)

Gol Bestan (Persian: گلبستان) (Note: Also romanized as Gol Bestān) is a village in Peyrajeh Rural District of the Central District in Neka County, Mazandaran province, Iran.

== Demographics ==
=== Population ===
At the time of the 2006 National Census, the village's population was 2,462 in 597 households. The following census in 2011 counted 2,866 people in 824 households. The 2016 census measured the population of the village as 3,114 people in 946 households, the most populous in its rural district.
