= Badabsar =

Badabsar بادابسر
- Village
- Location within Iran
- Coordinates: 36°28′13″N 53°54′09″E
- Country: Iran
- Province: Mazandaran
- County: Neka
- Bakhsh: Hezarjarib
- Rural District: Zarem Rud

Population (2016)
  - Total: 119
- Time zone: UTC+3:30 (IRST)

Badabsar (Persian: بادابسر, also Romanized as Bādābsar and Bād Āb Sar) is a village in Zarem Rud Rural District, Hezarjarib District, Neka County, Mazandaran Province, Iran, located in the Alborz (Elburz) mountain range.

At the 2016 census, its population was 119, in 41 families. Up from 109 in 2006.
