= Darzi Mahalleh, Neka =

Darzi Mahalleh درزی محله
- Village
- Location within Iran
- Coordinates: 36°41′16″N 53°19′19″E
- Country: Iran
- Province: Mazandaran
- County: Neka
- Bakhsh: Central
- Rural District: Mehravan

Population (2016)
  - Total: 269
- Time zone: UTC+3:30 (IRST)

Darzi Mahalleh (Persian: درزی محله, also Romanized as Darzī Maḩalleh) is a village in Mehravan Rural District, in the Central District of Neka County, Mazandaran Province, Iran. At the 2016 census, its population was 269, in 93 families. Up from 250 in 2006.
