= Suteh Kheyl =

Suteh Kheyl سوته خيل
- Village
- Location within Iran
- Coordinates: 36°29′37″N 53°40′39″E
- Country: Iran
- Province: Mazandaran
- County: Neka
- Bakhsh: Hezarjarib
- Rural District: Zarem Rud

Population (2016)
  - Total: 183
- Time zone: UTC+3:30 (IRST)

Suteh Kheyl (Persian: سوته خيل, also Romanized as Sūteh Kheyl) is a village in Zarem Rud Rural District, Hezarjarib District, Neka County, Mazandaran Province, Iran. At the 2016 census, its population was 183, in 77 families. Decreased from 363 people in 2006.
