= Valiji Mahalleh =

Valiji Mahalleh وليجی محله
- Village
- Location within Iran
- Coordinates: 36°37′00″N 53°17′00″E
- Country: Iran
- Province: Mazandaran
- County: Neka
- Bakhsh: Central
- Rural District: Peyrajeh

Population (2016)
  - Total: 272
- Time zone: UTC+3:30 (IRST)

Valiji Mahalleh (Persian: وليجی محله, also Romanized as Valījī Maḩalleh; also known as Valajī Maḩalleh) is a village in Peyrajeh Rural District, in the Central District of Neka County, Mazandaran Province, Iran.

At the time of the 2006 National Census, the village's population was 279 in 74 households. The following census in 2011 counted 251 people in 73 households. The 2016 census measured the population of the village as 272 people in 80 households.
