= Do Ab, Mazandaran =

Do Ab دواب
- Village
- Location within Iran
- Coordinates: 36°33′20″N 53°29′00″E
- Country: Iran
- Province: Mazandaran
- County: Neka
- Bakhsh: Central
- Rural District: Peyrajeh

Population (2016)
  - Total: 86
- Time zone: UTC+3:30 (IRST)

Do Ab (Persian: دواب, also Romanized as Do Āb) is a village in Peyrajeh Rural District, in the Central District of Neka County, Mazandaran Province, Iran.

At the time of the 2006 National Census, the village's population was 56 in 21 households. The following census in 2011 counted 82 people in 28 households. The 2016 census measured the population of the village as 86 people in 36 households.
