= Lak Tarash =

Lak Tarash لاک تراش
- Village
- Location within Iran
- Coordinates: 36°33′12″N 53°36′39″E
- Country: Iran
- Province: Mazandaran
- County: Neka
- Bakhsh: Central
- Rural District: Peyrajeh

Population (2016)
  - Total: 398
- Time zone: UTC+3:30 (IRST)

Lak Tarash (Persian: لاک تراش, also Romanized as Lāk Tarāsh and Lākterāsh) is a village in Peyrajeh Rural District, in the Central District of Neka County, Mazandaran Province, Iran.

At the time of the 2006 National Census, the village's population was 473 in 113 households. The following census in 2011 counted 440 people in 128 households. The 2016 census measured the population of the village as 398 people in 147 households.
