= Owmal =

Village in Mazandaran province, Iran

Owmal Persian: اومال
- Village
- Location within Iran
- Coordinates: 36°37′09″N 53°16′54″E
- Country: Iran
- Province: Mazandaran
- County: Neka
- District: Central
- Rural District: Peyrajeh

Population (2016)
  - Total: 1,198
- Time zone: UTC+3:30 (IRST)

Owmal (Persian: اومال) (Note: Also romanized as Owmāl and Ūmāl) is a village in Peyrajeh Rural District of the Central District in Neka County, Mazandaran province, Iran.

== Demographics ==
=== Population ===
At the time of the 2006 National Census, the village's population was 950 in 251 households. The following census in 2011 counted 1,093 people in 336 households. The 2016 census measured the population of the village as 1,198 people in 394 households.
