= Chaman, Mazandaran =

Chaman چمان
- Village
- Location within Iran
- Coordinates: 36°38′59″N 53°15′01″E
- Country: Iran
- Province: Mazandaran
- County: Neka
- Bakhsh: Central
- Rural District: Qareh Toghan

Population (2006)
  - Total: 507
- Time zone: UTC+3:30 (IRST)

Chaman (Persian: چمان, also Romanized as Chamān) is a village in Qareh Toghan Rural District, in the Central District of Neka County, Mazandaran Province, Iran. At the 2016 census, its population was 425, in 147 families. Down from 507 people in 2006.
