= Molla Kheyl =

Molla Kheyl or Molla Kheil (Persian: ملاخيل) may refer to:

- Molla Kheyl-e Lai
- Molla Kheyl-e Purva
