= Sika, Iran =

Sika سيكا
- Village
- Location within Iran
- Coordinates: 36°22′18″N 53°32′44″E
- Country: Iran
- Province: Mazandaran
- County: Neka
- Bakhsh: Hezarjarib
- Rural District: Estakhr-e Posht

Population (2016)
  - Total: 165
- Time zone: UTC+3:30 (IRST)

Sika (Persian: سيكا, also Romanized as Sīkā) is a village in Estakhr-e Posht Rural District, Hezarjarib District, Neka County, Mazandaran Province, Iran. At the 2006 census, its population was 204, in 46 families. In 2016, it had 165 people in 57 households.
