= Band-e Bon, Neka =

Band-e Bon بندبن
- Village
- Location within Iran
- Coordinates: 36°28′03″N 53°58′20″E
- Country: Iran
- Province: Mazandaran
- County: Neka
- Bakhsh: Hezarjarib
- Rural District: Zarem Rud

Population (2016)
  - Total: 77
- Time zone: UTC+3:30 (IRST)

Band-e Bon (Persian: بندبن) is a village in Zarem Rud Rural District, Hezarjarib District, Neka County, Mazandaran Province, Iran, located in the Alborz (Elburz) mountain range.

At the 2016 census, its population was 77, in 26 families. Down from 98 people in 2006.
