= Kafkur =

Kafkur كفكور
- Village
- Location within Iran
- Coordinates: 36°32′08″N 53°39′39″E
- Country: Iran
- Province: Mazandaran
- County: Neka
- Bakhsh: Hezarjarib
- Rural District: Zarem Rud

Population (2016)
  - Total: 74
- Time zone: UTC+3:30 (IRST)

Kafkur (Persian: كفكور, also Romanized as Kafkūr; also known as Kabkūr) is a village in Zarem Rud Rural District, Hezarjarib District, Neka County, Mazandaran Province, Iran, located in the Alborz (Elburz) mountain range.

At the 2016 census, its population was 74, in 23 families. Large increase from only 10 people in 2006.
