= Tus Kola =

Village in Mazandaran province, Iran

Tus Kola Persian: طوس كلا
- Village
- Location within Iran
- Coordinates: 36°41′41″N 53°17′02″E
- Country: Iran
- Province: Mazandaran
- County: Neka
- District: Central
- Rural District: Qareh Toghan

Population (2016)
  - Total: 1,671
- Time zone: UTC+3:30 (IRST)

Tus Kola (Persian: طوس كلا) (Note: Also romanized as Ţūs Kolā; also known as Ţūs Kūlā) is a village in, and the capital of, Qareh Toghan Rural District in the Central District of Neka County, Mazandaran province, Iran.

== Demographics ==
=== Population ===
At the time of the 2006 National Census, the village's population was 1,618 in 418 households. The following census in 2011 counted 1,728 people in 506 households. The 2016 census measured the population of the village as 1,671 people in 542 households.
