= Eskardin =

Eskardin اسكاردين
- Village
- Location within Iran
- Coordinates: 36°42′26″N 53°21′25″E
- Country: Iran
- Province: Mazandaran
- County: Neka
- Bakhsh: Central
- Rural District: Mehravan

Population (2016)
  - Total: 90
- Time zone: UTC+3:30 (IRST)

Eskardin (Persian: اسكاردين, also Romanized as Eskārdīn) is a village in Mehravan Rural District, in the Central District of Neka County, Mazandaran Province, Iran. At the 2006 census, its population was 95, in 29 families. In 2016, it had 90 people in 35 households.
