= Khaneh Sar, Mazandaran =

Village in Mazandaran province, Iran

Khaneh Sar Persian: خانه سر
- Village
- Location within Iran
- Coordinates: 36°40′30″N 53°22′24″E
- Country: Iran
- Province: Mazandaran
- County: Neka
- District: Central
- Rural District: Mehravan

Population (2016)
  - Total: 513
- Time zone: UTC+3:30 (IRST)

Khaneh Sar (Persian: خانه سر) (Note: Also romanized as Khāneh Sar) is a village in Mehravan Rural District of the Central District in Neka County, Mazandaran province, Iran.

== Demographics ==
=== Population ===
At the time of the 2006 National Census, the village's population was 463 in 110 households. The following census in 2011 counted 484 people in 134 households. The 2016 census measured the population of the village as 513 people in 154 households.
