= Nowzarabad =

Village in Mazandaran province, Iran

Nowzarabad Persian: نوذر آباد
- Village
- Location within Iran
- Coordinates: 36°48′33″N 53°14′50″E
- Country: Iran
- Province: Mazandaran
- County: Neka
- District: Central
- Rural District: Qareh Toghan

Population (2016)
  - Total: 1,892
- Time zone: UTC+3:30 (IRST)

Nowzarabad (Persian: نوذراباد) (Note: Also romanized as Nowz̄arābād; also known as Puzehābād) is a village in Qareh Toghan Rural District of the Central District in Neka County, Mazandaran province, Iran.

== Demographics ==
=== Population ===
At the time of the 2006 National Census, the village's population was 1,991 in 560 households. The following census in 2011 counted 1,675 people in 556 households. The 2016 census measured the population of the village as 1,892 people in 632 households.
