= Khvorshid, Mazandaran =

Village in Mazandaran province, Iran

Khvorshid Persian: خورشيد
- Village
- Location within Iran
- Coordinates: 36°44′39″N 53°16′57″E
- Country: Iran
- Province: Mazandaran
- County: Neka
- District: Central
- Rural District: Qareh Toghan

Population (2016)
  - Total: 2,293
- Time zone: UTC+3:30 (IRST)

Khvorshid (Persian: خورشيد) (Note: Also romanized as Khowrshīd and Khvorshīd; also known as Khorshīd) is a village in Qareh Toghan Rural District of the Central District in Neka County, Mazandaran province, Iran.

== Demographics ==
=== Population ===
At the time of the 2006 National Census, the village's population was 2,175 in 556 households. The following census in 2011 counted 2,222 people in 657 households. The 2016 census measured the population of the village as 2,293 people in 748 households, the most populous in its rural district.
