= Eram, Neka =

Village in Mazandaran province, Iran

Eram Persian: ارم
- Village
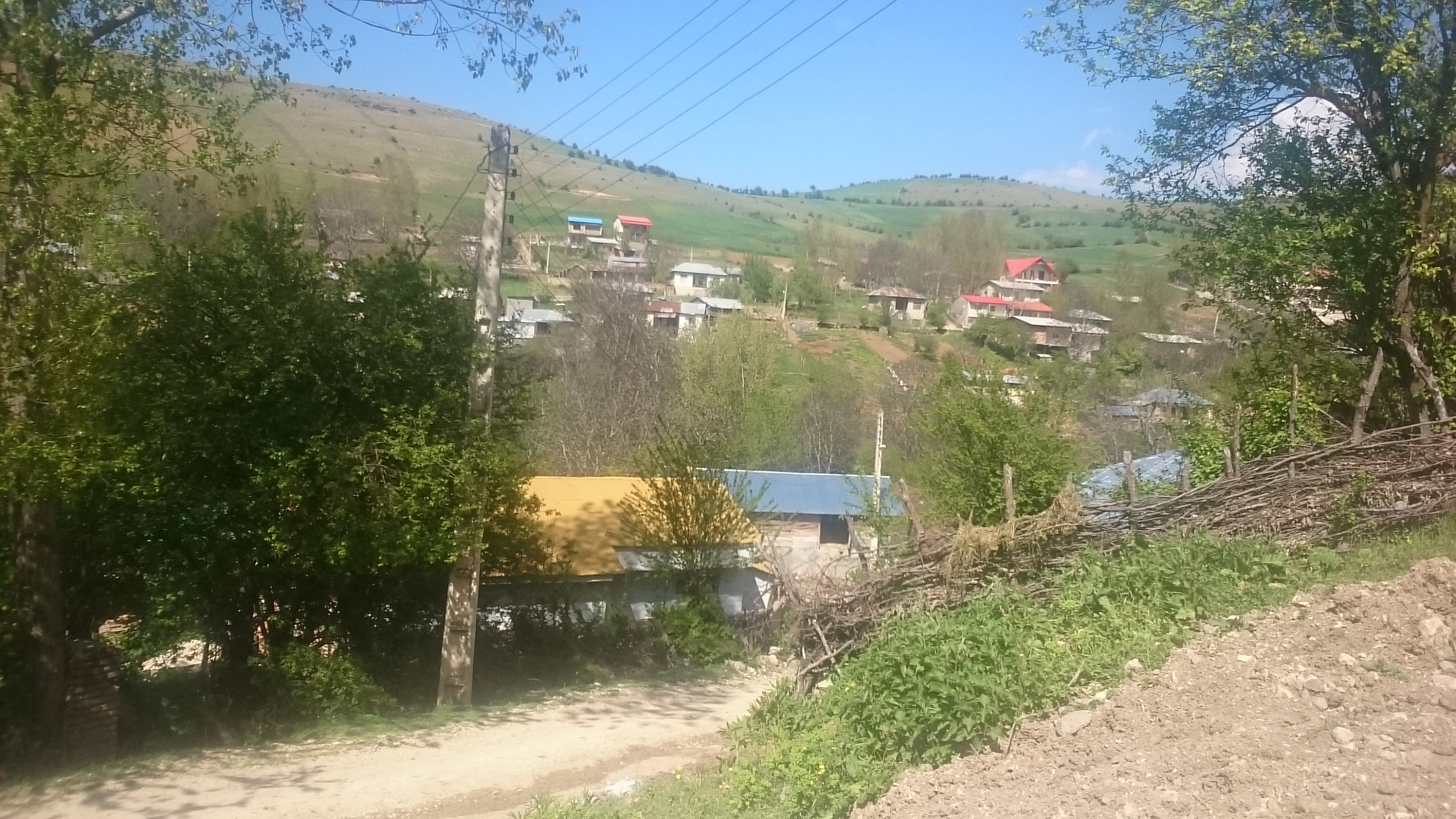
- The village of Eram

- Location within Iran
- Coordinates: 36°24′21″N 53°42′13″E
- Country: Iran
- Province: Mazandaran
- County: Neka
- District: Hezarjarib
- Rural District: Estakhr-e Posht

Population (2016)
  - Total: 244
- Time zone: UTC+3:30 (IRST)

Eram (Persian: ارم) is a village in Estakhr-e Posht Rural District of Hezarjarib District in Neka County, Mazandaran province, Iran.

== Demographics ==
=== Population ===
At the time of the 2006 National Census, the village's population was 184 in 41 households. The following census in 2011 counted 285 people in 73 households. The 2016 census measured the population of the village as 244 people in 83 households.
