= Safal Mian =

Safal Mian سفل ميان
- Village
- Location within Iran
- Coordinates: 36°30′13″N 53°30′28″E
- Country: Iran
- Province: Mazandaran
- County: Neka
- Bakhsh: Hezarjarib
- Rural District: Zarem Rud

Population (2016)
  - Total: 145
- Time zone: UTC+3:30 (IRST)

Safal Mian (Persian: سفل ميان, also Romanized as Safal Mīān; also known as Sapal-e Mīān, Sapal Meyān, and Sapal Mīān) is a village in Zarem Rud Rural District, Hezarjarib District, Neka County, Mazandaran Province, Iran. At the 2016 census, its population was 145, in 39 families. Up from 120 in 2006.
