= Mian Galleh =

Village in Mazandaran province, Iran

Mian Galleh Persian: ميان گاله
- Village
- Location within Iran
- Coordinates: 36°40′17″N 53°19′43″E
- Country: Iran
- Province: Mazandaran
- County: Neka
- District: Central
- Rural District: Mehravan

Population (2016)
  - Total: 1,039
- Time zone: UTC+3:30 (IRST)

Mian Galleh (Persian: ميان گاله) (Note: Also romanized as Meyān Galleh and Mīān Galleh; also known as Mīān Goleh) is a village in Mehravan Rural District of the Central District in Neka County, Mazandaran province, Iran.

== Demographics ==
=== Population ===
At the time of the 2006 National Census, the village's population was 1,216 in 305 households. The following census in 2011 counted 1,151 people in 339 households. The 2016 census measured the population of the village as 1,039 people in 348 households.
