= Kolet =

Village in Mazandaran province, Iran

Kolet Persian: كلت
- Village
- Location within Iran
- Coordinates: 36°40′30″N 53°23′01″E
- Country: Iran
- Province: Mazandaran
- County: Neka
- District: Central
- Rural District: Mehravan

Population (2016)
  - Total: 904
- Time zone: UTC+3:30 (IRST)

Kolet (Persian: كلت) is a village in Mehravan Rural District of the Central District in Neka County, Mazandaran province, Iran.

== Demographics ==
=== Population ===
At the time of the 2006 National Census, the village's population was 961 in 229 households. The following census in 2011 counted 893 people in 271 households. The 2016 census measured the population of the village as 904 people in 291 households.
