= Now Deh, Neka =

Now Deh نوده
- Village
- Location within Iran
- Coordinates: 36°27′24″N 53°46′42″E
- Country: Iran
- Province: Mazandaran
- County: Neka
- Bakhsh: Hezarjarib
- Rural District: Zarem Rud

Population (2016)
  - Total: 105
- Time zone: UTC+3:30 (IRST)

Now Deh (Persian: نوده) is a village in Zarem Rud Rural District, Hezarjarib District, Neka County, Mazandaran Province, Iran. At the 2016 census, its population was 105, in 35 families. Up from 66 people in 2006.
