= Gorg Taj =

Gorg Taj گرگتج
- Village
- Location within Iran
- Coordinates: 36°32′43″N 53°34′41″E
- Country: Iran
- Province: Mazandaran
- County: Neka
- Bakhsh: Central
- Rural District: Peyrajeh

Population (2016)
  - Total: 50
- Time zone: UTC+3:30 (IRST)

Gorg Taj (Persian: گرگتج, also Romanized as Gorg Tāj) is a village in Peyrajeh Rural District, in the Central District of Neka County, Mazandaran Province, Iran.

At the time of the 2006 National Census, the village's population was 62 in 17 households. The following census in 2011 counted 60 people in 14 households. The 2016 census measured the population of the village as 50 people in 16 households.
