= Zanget =

Zanget (Persian: زنگت) may refer to:

- Zanget-e Olya
- Zanget-e Sofla
