= Ab Chin =

Village in Mazandaran province, Iran

Ab Chin Persian: آب چين
- Village
- Location within Iran
- Coordinates: 36°30′27″N 53°40′22″E
- Country: Iran
- Province: Mazandaran
- County: Neka
- District: Hezarjarib
- Rural District: Zarem Rud

Population (2016)
  - Total: 318
- Time zone: UTC+3:30 (IRST)

Ab Chin (Persian: آب چين) (Note: Also romanized as Āb Chīn) is a village in Zarem Rud Rural District of Hezarjarib District in Neka County, Mazandaran province, Iran.

== Demographics ==
=== Population ===
At the time of the 2006 National Census, the village's population was 271 in 75 households. The following census in 2011 counted 275 people in 89 households. The 2016 census measured the population of the village as 318 people in 92 households.
