= Talam, Iran =

Talam تلم
- Village
- Location within Iran
- Coordinates: 36°23′50″N 53°36′19″E
- Country: Iran
- Province: Mazandaran
- County: Neka
- Bakhsh: Hezarjarib
- Rural District: Estakhr-e Posht

Population (2016)
  - Total: 16
- Time zone: UTC+3:30 (IRST)

Talam (Persian: تلم; also known as Jalam) is a village in Estakhr-e Posht Rural District, Hezarjarib District, Neka County, Mazandaran Province, Iran. At the 2016 census, its population was 16, in 5 families. Decreased from 33 people in 2006.
