= Gel Kheyl =

Village in Mazandaran province, Iran

Gel Kheyl Persian: گل خيل
- Village
- Location within Iran
- Coordinates: 36°40′27″N 53°20′19″E
- Country: Iran
- Province: Mazandaran
- County: Neka
- District: Central
- Rural District: Mehravan

Population (2016)
  - Total: 659
- Time zone: UTC+3:30 (IRST)

Gel Kheyl (Persian: گل خيل) is a village in, and the capital of, Mehravan Rural District in the Central District of Neka County, Mazandaran province, Iran.

== Demographics ==
=== Population ===
At the time of the 2006 National Census, the village's population was 755 in 185 households. The following census in 2011 counted 705 people in 214 households. The 2016 census measured the population of the village as 659 people in 211 households.
