= Qaleh Sar-e Olya =

Village in Mazandaran province, Iran

Qaleh Sar-e Olya Persian: قلعه سر عليا
- Village
- Location within Iran
- Coordinates: 36°35′52″N 53°17′59″E
- Country: Iran
- Province: Mazandaran
- County: Neka
- District: Central
- Rural District: Peyrajeh

Population (2016)
  - Total: 1,853
- Time zone: UTC+3:30 (IRST)

Qaleh Sar-e Olya (Persian: قلعه سر عليا) (Note: Also romanized as Qal‘eh Sar-e ‘Olyā; also known as Bālā Qal’eh, Bālā Qal‘eh Sar, and Qal‘eh Sar Bālā) is a village in Peyrajeh Rural District of the Central District in Neka County, Mazandaran province, Iran.

== Demographics ==
=== Population ===
At the time of the 2006 National Census, the village's population was 1,646 in 407 households. The following census in 2011 counted 1,786 people in 522 households. The 2016 census measured the population of the village as 1,853 people in 582 households.
