= Emamiyeh, Mazandaran =

Emamiyeh اماميه
- Village
- Interactive map of Emamiyeh
- Coordinates: 36°43′31″N 53°16′39″E
- Country: Iran
- Province: Mazandaran
- County: Neka
- Bakhsh: Central
- Rural District: Qareh Toghan

Population (2016)
  - Total: 178
- Time zone: UTC+3:30 (IRST)

Emamiyeh (Persian: اماميه, also Romanized as Emāmīyeh) is a village in Qareh Toghan Rural District, in the Central District of Neka County, Mazandaran Province, Iran. At the 2016 census, its population was 178, in 49 families. Up from 158 in 2006.
