= Berma-ye Zarem Rud =

Berma-ye Zarem Rud برما زارم رود
- Village
- Location within Iran
- Coordinates: 36°27′45″N 53°43′55″E
- Country: Iran
- Province: Mazandaran
- County: Neka
- Bakhsh: Hezarjarib
- Rural District: Zarem Rud

Population (2016)
  - Total: 252
- Time zone: UTC+3:30 (IRST)

Berma-ye Zarem Rud (Persian: برما زارم رود, also Romanized as Bermā-ye Zārem Rūd; also known as Bermā) is a village in Zarem Rud Rural District, Hezarjarib District, Neka County, Mazandaran Province, Iran, located in the Alborz (Elburz) mountain range.

At the 2016 census, its population was 252, in 82 households. Up from 189 people in 2006.
