= Tajar Kheyl =

Tajar Kheyl تجرخيل
- Village
- Location within Iran
- Coordinates: 36°28′54″N 53°56′44″E
- Country: Iran
- Province: Mazandaran
- County: Neka
- Bakhsh: Hezarjarib
- Rural District: Zarem Rud

Population (2016)
  - Total: 32
- Time zone: UTC+3:30 (IRST)

Tajar Kheyl (Persian: تجرخيل) is a village in Zarem Rud Rural District, Hezarjarib District, Neka County, Mazandaran Province, Iran. At the 2016 census, its population was 32, in 12 families. Decreased from 69 people in 2006.
