= Abelu =

Village in Mazandaran province, Iran

Abelu Persian: ابلو
- Village
- Location within Iran
- Coordinates: 36°38′32″N 53°19′09″E
- Country: Iran
- Province: Mazandaran
- County: Neka
- District: Central
- Rural District: Mehravan

Population (2016)
  - Total: 1,392
- Time zone: UTC+3:30 (IRST)

Abelu (Persian: ابلو) (Note: Also romanized as Ābelū; Mazandarani: (آبلو), romanized as Āblū) is a village in Mehravan Rural District of the Central District in Neka County, Mazandaran province, Iran.

== Demographics ==
=== Population ===
At the time of the 2006 National Census, the village's population was 1,648 in 406 households. The following census in 2011 counted 1,439 people in 420 households. The 2016 census measured the population of the village as 1,392 people in 458 households.
