= Vavodin =

Vavdin واودين
- Village
- Location within Iran
- Coordinates: 36°31′38″N 53°41′14″E
- Country: Iran
- Province: Mazandaran
- County: Neka
- Bakhsh: Hezarjarib
- Rural District: Zarem Rud

Population (2016)
  - Total: 90
- Time zone: UTC+3:30 (IRST)

Vavdin (Persian: واودين, also Romanized as Vāvdīn; also known as ‘Ābedīn and ‘Ābedīn) is a village in Zarem Rud Rural District, Hezarjarib District, Neka County, Mazandaran Province, Iran. At the 2016 census, its population was 90, in 29 families. Down from 143 people in 2006.
