= Darvishan, Mazandaran =

Darvishan درويشان
- Village
- Location within Iran
- Coordinates: 36°34′49″N 53°23′57″E
- Country: Iran
- Province: Mazandaran
- County: Neka
- Bakhsh: Hezarjarib
- Rural District: Zarem Rud

Population (2016)
  - Total: 160
- Time zone: UTC+3:30 (IRST)

Darvishan (Persian: درويشان, also Romanized as Darvīshān) is a village in Zarem Rud Rural District, Hezarjarib District, Neka County, Mazandaran Province, Iran. At the 2016 census, its population was 160, in 48 families. Up from 130 people in 2006.
