= Darvish Khalak =

Darvish Khalak درويش خلک
- Village
- Location within Iran
- Coordinates: 36°33′47″N 53°28′56″E
- Country: Iran
- Province: Mazandaran
- County: Neka
- Bakhsh: Central
- Rural District: Peyrajeh

Population (2016)
  - Total: 100
- Time zone: UTC+3:30 (IRST)

Darvish Khalak (Persian: درويش خلک, also Romanized as Darvīsh Khalak; also known as Darvīsh Khīlak) is a village in Peyrajeh Rural District, in the Central District of Neka County, Mazandaran Province, Iran.

At the time of the 2006 National Census, the village's population was 89 in 27 households. The following census in 2011 counted 187 people in 62 households. The 2016 census measured the population of the village as 100 people in 35 households.
