= Sefid Kuh, Mazandaran =

Sefid Kuh سفيدكوه
- Village
- Location within Iran
- Coordinates: 36°24′21″N 53°40′24″E
- Country: Iran
- Province: Mazandaran
- County: Neka
- Bakhsh: Hezarjarib
- Rural District: Estakhr-e Posht

Population (2016)
  - Total: 84
- Time zone: UTC+3:30 (IRST)

Sefid Kuh (Persian: سفيدكوه, also Romanized as Sefīd Kūh) is a village in Estakhr-e Posht Rural District, Hezarjarib District, Neka County, Mazandaran Province, Iran. At the 2006 census, its population was 104, in 27 families. In 2016, it had 84 people in 31 households.
