= Pajat =

Pajat or Pajet (Persian: پجت or پاجات) may refer to:

- Pajat, Kohgiluyeh and Boyer-Ahmad (پاجات - Pājāt)
- Pajat, Mazandaran (پجت - Pajat)
- Pajat, Behshahr, Mazandaran Province (پجت - Pajat)
