= Kuhsar Kandeh =

Village in Mazandaran province, Iran

Kuhsar Persian: كوهساركنده
- Village
- Location within Iran
- Coordinates: 36°33′31″N 53°20′10″E
- Country: Iran
- Province: Mazandaran
- County: Neka
- District: Central
- Rural District: Peyrajeh

Population (2016)
  - Total: 505
- Time zone: UTC+3:30 (IRST)

Kuhsar Kandeh (Persian: كوهساركنده) (Note: Also romanized as Kūhsār Kandeh) is a village in Peyrajeh Rural District of the Central District in Neka County, Mazandaran province, Iran.

== Demographics ==
=== Population ===
At the time of the 2006 National Census, the village's population was 598 in 145 households. The following census in 2011 counted 520 people in 142 households. The 2016 census measured the population of the village as 505 people in 157 households.
