= Behzad Kola =

Village in Mazandaran province, Iran

Behzad Kola Persian: بهزادكلا
- Village
- Location within Iran
- Coordinates: 36°42′41″N 53°18′47″E
- Country: Iran
- Province: Mazandaran
- County: Neka
- District: Central
- Rural District: Qareh Toghan

Population (2016)
  - Total: 1,046
- Time zone: UTC+3:30 (IRST)

Behzad Kola (Persian: بهزادكلا) (Note: Also romanized as Behzād Kolā) is a village in Qareh Toghan Rural District of the Central District in Neka County, Mazandaran province, Iran.

== Demographics ==
=== Population ===
At the time of the 2006 National Census, the village's population was 1,018 in 265 households. The following census in 2011 counted 1,238 people in 346 households. The 2016 census measured the population of the village as 1,046 people in 331 households.
