= Chupan Boneh-ye Ajand =

Chupan Boneh-ye Ajand چوپان بنه آجند
- Village
- Location within Iran
- Coordinates: 36°48′19″N 53°19′47″E
- Country: Iran
- Province: Mazandaran
- County: Neka
- Bakhsh: Central
- Rural District: Mehravan

Population (2016)
  - Total: 30
- Time zone: UTC+3:30 (IRST)

Chupan Boneh-ye Ajand (Persian: چوپان بنه آجند, also Romanized as Chūpān Boneh-ye Ājand; also known as Chūpān Boneh and Chūpān Boneh Zenīvand) is a village in Mehravan Rural District, in the Central District of Neka County, Mazandaran Province, Iran. At the 2016 census, its population was 30, in 10 families. Down from 44 people in 2006.
