= Hoseynabad, Zarem Rud =

Hoseynabad حسين آباد
- Village
- Interactive map of Hoseynabad
- Coordinates: 36°27′58.831″N 53°52′45.703″E
- Country: Iran
- Province: Mazandaran
- County: Neka
- Bakhsh: Hezarjarib
- Rural District: Zarem Rud

Population (2006)
  - Total: 24
- Time zone: UTC+3:30 (IRST)

Hoseynabad (Persian: حسين آباد, also Romanized as Ḩoseynābād) is a village in Zarem Rud Rural District, Hezarjarib District, Neka County, Mazandaran Province, Iran. At the 2006 census, its population was 24, in eight families.

In 2016, its population was not reported as it had less than four households.
