= Ziarat Kola =

Village in Mazandaran province, Iran

Ziarat Kola Persian: زيارت كلا
- Village
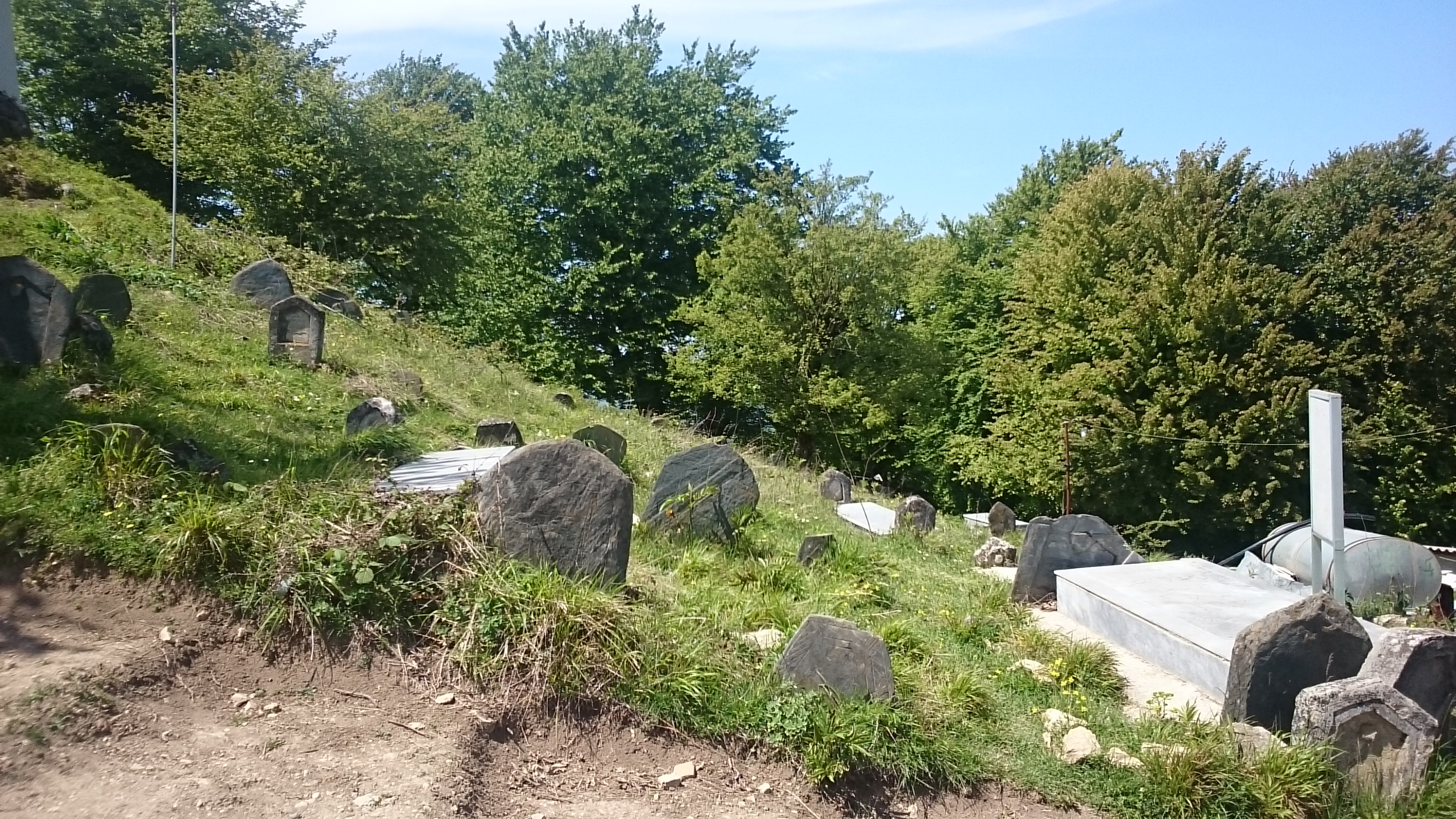
- Cemetery in the village of Ziarat Kola

- Location within Iran
- Coordinates: 36°30′25″N 53°39′23″E
- Country: Iran
- Province: Mazandaran
- County: Neka
- District: Hezarjarib
- Rural District: Zarem Rud

Population (2016)
  - Total: 571
- Time zone: UTC+3:30 (IRST)

Ziarat Kola (Persian: زيارت كلا) (Note: Also romanized as Zeyārat Kolā, Zīārat Kalā, and Zīārat Kolā; also known as Zīārat Kūlā) is a village in, and the capital of, Zarem Rud Rural District in Hezarjarib District of Neka County, Mazandaran province, Iran.

== Demographics ==
=== Population ===
At the time of the 2006 National Census, the village's population was 423 in 94 households. The following census in 2011 counted 441 people in 115 households. The 2016 census measured the population of the village as 571 people in 128 households.
