= Maras, Iran =

Maras, Iran, may refer to:

- Maras-e Bozorg
- Maras-e Kuchak
