= Charmi, Mazandaran =

Charmi چرمي
- Village
- Location within Iran
- Coordinates: 36°24′09″N 53°35′10″E
- Country: Iran
- Province: Mazandaran
- County: Neka
- Bakhsh: Hezarjarib
- Rural District: Estakhr-e Posht

Population (2016)
  - Total: 59
- Time zone: UTC+3:30 (IRST)

Charmi (Persian: چرمي, also Romanized as Charmī) is a village in Estakhr-e Posht Rural District, Hezarjarib District, Neka County, Mazandaran Province, Iran. At the 2016 census, its population was 59, in 20 families.
