= Lalard =

Lalard للرد
- Village
- Location within Iran
- Coordinates: 36°35′13″N 53°33′35″E
- Country: Iran
- Province: Mazandaran
- County: Neka
- Bakhsh: Central
- Rural District: Peyrajeh

Population (2016)
  - Total: 228
- Time zone: UTC+3:30 (IRST)

Lalard (Persian: للرد) is a village in Peyrajeh Rural District, in the Central District of Neka County, Mazandaran Province, Iran.

At the time of the 2006 National Census, the village's population was 334 in 79 households. The following census in 2011 counted 323 people in 78 households. The 2016 census measured the population of the village as 228 people in 84 households.
