= Nedaf Kheyl =

Nedaf Kheyl نداف خيل
- Village
- Location within Iran
- Coordinates: 36°41′32″N 53°19′35″E
- Country: Iran
- Province: Mazandaran
- County: Neka
- Bakhsh: Central
- Rural District: Mehravan

Population (2016)
  - Total: 149
- Time zone: UTC+3:30 (IRST)

Nedaf Kheyl (Persian: نداف خيل, also Romanized as Nedāf Kheyl and Nedāfakhīl; also known as Nedābakhl) is a village in Mehravan Rural District, in the Central District of Neka County, Mazandaran Province, Iran. At the 2006 census, its population was 210, in 51 families. In 2016, it had 149 people in 55 households.
