= Zanger =

Zanger is a surname. Notable people with the surname include:

- Johann Zanger (1557–1607), German jurist and professor of law
- Marcel Zanger (1973–2016), German boxer
- Walter Zanger (1930s–2015), American-born Israeli author, tour guide, and television personality
- Wolfgang Zanger (born 1968), Austrian politician

== See also ==
- Zanger Rinus (born 1969), Dutch singer
- Bala Zanger
- Pa'in Zanger
