= Kachab Mahalleh =

Village in Mazandaran province, Iran

Kachab Mahalleh Persian: كچپ محله
- Village
- Location within Iran
- Coordinates: 36°24′50″N 53°39′59″E
- Country: Iran
- Province: Mazandaran
- County: Neka
- District: Hezarjarib
- Rural District: Estakhr-e Posht

Population (2016)
  - Total: 510
- Time zone: UTC+3:30 (IRST)

Kachab Mahalleh (Persian: كچب محله) (Note: Also romanized as Kachab Maḩalleh; also known as Kachap Maḩalleh) is a village in Estakhr-e Posht Rural District of Hezarjarib District in Neka County, Mazandaran province, Iran.

== Demographics ==
=== Population ===
At the time of the 2006 National Census, the village's population was 971 in 193 households. The following census in 2011 counted 976 people in 206 households. The 2016 census measured the population of the village as 510 people in 155 households.
