= Farimak =

Farimak فريمک
- Village
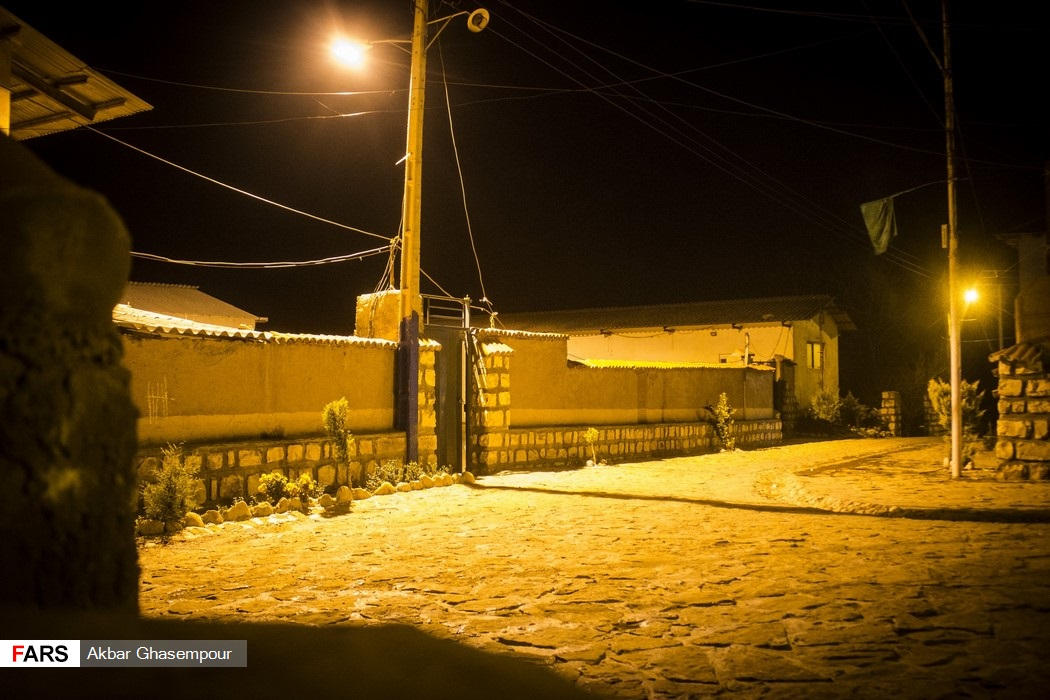

- Location within Iran
- Coordinates: 36°27′59″N 53°42′22″E
- Country: Iran
- Province: Mazandaran
- County: Neka
- Bakhsh: Hezarjarib
- Rural District: Zarem Rud

Population (2016)
  - Total: 150
- Time zone: UTC+3:30 (IRST)

Farimak (Persian: فريمک, also Romanized as Farīmak) is a village in Zarem Rud Rural District, Hezarjarib District, Neka County, Mazandaran Province, Iran.

It is located in the Alborz (Elburz) mountain range.

At the 2016 census, its population was 150, in 47 households. Up from 144 in 2006.
