= Limundeh =

Limundeh ليمونده
- Village
- Location within Iran
- Coordinates: 36°26′54″N 53°50′33″E
- Country: Iran
- Province: Mazandaran
- County: Neka
- Bakhsh: Hezarjarib
- Rural District: Zarem Rud

Population (2016)
  - Total: 55
- Time zone: UTC+3:30 (IRST)

Limundeh (Persian: ليمونده, also Romanized as Līmūndeh) is a village in Zarem Rud Rural District, Hezarjarib District, Neka County, Mazandaran Province, Iran. At the 2016 census, its population was 55, in 22 families. Decreased from 113 people in 2006.
