= Mellij Galleh =

Mellij Galleh مليج گاله
- Village
- Location within Iran
- Coordinates: 36°41′55″N 53°20′30″E
- Country: Iran
- Province: Mazandaran
- County: Neka
- Bakhsh: Central
- Rural District: Mehravan

Population (2016)
  - Total: 197
- Time zone: UTC+3:30 (IRST)

Mellij Galleh (Persian: مليج گاله, also Romanized as Mellīj Galleh; also known as Malīk Kāleh and Mellī Galleh) is a village in Mehravan Rural District, in the Central District of Neka County, Mazandaran Province, Iran. At the 2016 census, its population was 197, in 61 families. Up from 185 in 2006.
