= Alukandeh =

Alukandeh آلوكنده
- Village
- Location within Iran
- Coordinates: 36°40′11″N 53°15′54″E
- Country: Iran
- Province: Mazandaran
- County: Neka
- Bakhsh: Central
- Rural District: Qareh Toghan

Population (2016)
  - Total: 857
- Time zone: UTC+3:30 (IRST)

Alukandeh (Persian: آلوكنده, also Romanized as Ālūkandeh; also known as ‘Alī Kandeh) is a village in Qareh Toghan Rural District, in the Central District of Neka County, Mazandaran Province, Iran. At the 2016 census, its population was 857, in 266 families. Up from 797 in 2006.
