= Berijan =

Village in Mazandaran province, Iran

Berijan Persian: بريجان
- Village
- Location within Iran
- Coordinates: 36°36′44″N 53°16′51″E
- Country: Iran
- Province: Mazandaran
- County: Neka
- District: Central
- Rural District: Peyrajeh

Population (2016)
  - Total: 570
- Time zone: UTC+3:30 (IRST)

Berijan (Persian: بريجان) (Note: Also romanized as Berījān) is a village in Peyrajeh Rural District of the Central District in Neka County, Mazandaran province, Iran.

== Demographics ==
=== Population ===
At the time of the 2006 National Census, the village's population was 549 in 134 households. The following census in 2011 counted 516 people in 146 households. The 2016 census measured the population of the village as 570 people in 158 households.
