= Nim Chah =

Nim Chah نيم چاه
- Village
- Location within Iran
- Coordinates: 36°40′25″N 53°17′36″E
- Country: Iran
- Province: Mazandaran
- County: Neka
- Bakhsh: Central
- Rural District: Qareh Toghan

Population (2016)
  - Total: 492
- Time zone: UTC+3:30 (IRST)

Nim Chah (Persian: نيم چاه, also Romanized as Nīm Chāh) is a village in Qareh Toghan Rural District, in the Central District of Neka County, Mazandaran Province, Iran. At the 2016 census, its population was 492, in 164. Up from 424 in 2006.
