= Kafarat =

Village in Mazandaran province, Iran

Kafarat Persian: كفرات
- Village
- Location within Iran
- Coordinates: 36°25′00″N 53°36′44″E
- Country: Iran
- Province: Mazandaran
- County: Neka
- District: Hezarjarib
- Rural District: Estakhr-e Posht

Population (2016)
  - Total: 279
- Time zone: UTC+3:30 (IRST)

Kafarat (Persian: كفرات) (Note: Also romanized as Kafarāt and Kafrāt) is a village in Estakhr-e Posht Rural District of Hezarjarib District in Neka County, Mazandaran province, Iran.

== Demographics ==
=== Population ===
At the time of the 2006 National Census, the village's population was 318 in 72 households. The following census in 2011 counted 324 people in 91 households. The 2016 census measured the population of the village as 279 people in 90 households.
