= Gelvard-e Kuchek =

Gelvard-e Kuchek گلورد کوچک
- Village
- Location within Iran
- Coordinates: 36°34′22″N 53°35′35″E
- Country: Iran
- Province: Mazandaran
- County: Neka
- Bakhsh: Central
- Rural District: Peyrajeh

Population (2016)
  - Total: 48
- Time zone: UTC+3:30 (IRST)

Gelvard-e Kuchek (Persian: گلورد کوچک, also Romanized as Gelvard-e Kūchek; also known as Gīlavard-e Kūchek and Gīlavard Kūchek) is a village in Peyrajeh Rural District, in the Central District of Neka County, Mazandaran Province, Iran.

At the time of the 2006 National Census, the village's population was 24 in 12 households. The following census in 2011 counted 23 people in 11 households. The 2016 census measured the population of the village as 48 people in 17 households.
