= Daram, Iran =

Daram (Persian: درام or درم) in Iran may refer to:

- Daram, Mazandaran (درام - Darām)
- Daram, Zanjan (درم - Daram)
