= Arzak, Iran =

Arzak آرزک
- Village
- Location within Iran
- Coordinates: 36°31′27″N 53°40′02″E
- Country: Iran
- Province: Mazandaran
- County: Neka
- Bakhsh: Hezarjarib
- Rural District: Zarem Rud

Population (2016)
  - Total: 100
- Time zone: UTC+3:30 (IRST)

Arzak (Persian: آرزک, also Romanized as Ārzak; also known as Azark and Azrak) is a village in Zarem Rud Rural District, Hezarjarib District, Neka County, Mazandaran Province, Iran. At the 2016 census, its population was 100, in 32 families. Down from 132 people in 2006.
