= Mohsenabad, Mazandaran =

Mohsenabad محسن آباد
- Village
- Location within Iran
- Coordinates: 36°32′17″N 53°40′47″E
- Country: Iran
- Province: Mazandaran
- County: Neka
- Bakhsh: Hezarjarib
- Rural District: Zarem Rud

Population (2006)
  - Total: 131
- Time zone: UTC+3:30 (IRST)

Mohsenabad (Persian: محسن آباد, also Romanized as Moḩsenābād; also known as Eyū) is a village in Zarem Rud Rural District, Hezarjarib District, Neka County, Mazandaran Province, Iran, located in the Alborz (Elburz) mountain range.

At the 2016 census, its population was 132, in 46 families. Up from 131 in 2006.
