= Siavash Kola =

Siavash Kola or Seyavash Kola or Siavosh Kala (Persian: سياوش كلا) may refer to:

- Siavash Kola, Neka
- Siavash Kola, Sari
