= Zarandin-e Sofla =

Village in Mazandaran province, Iran

Zarandin-e Sofla Persian: زرندين سفلي
- Village
- Location within Iran
- Coordinates: 36°37′24″N 53°19′42″E
- Country: Iran
- Province: Mazandaran
- County: Neka
- District: Central
- Rural District: Peyrajeh

Population (2016)
  - Total: 2,291
- Time zone: UTC+3:30 (IRST)

Zarandin-e Sofla (Persian: زرندين سفلي) (Note: Also romanized as Zarandīn-e Soflá; also known as Pā’īn Zarandīn and Zarandīn-e Pā’īn) is a village in, and the capital of, Peyrajeh Rural District in the Central District of Neka County, Mazandaran province, Iran.

== Demographics ==
=== Population ===
At the time of the 2006 National Census, the village's population was 2,166 in 572 households. The following census in 2011 counted 2,558 people in 753 households. The 2016 census measured the population of the village as 2,291 people in 761 households.
