= Oh Shit =

Oh Shit may refer to:

- Oh Shit!, a 1985 video game
- "Oh Shit", a 1978 song by Buzzcocks issued as the B-side to "What Do I Get?", later included as a bonus track for the 1996 re-release of Another Music in a Different Kitchen
- "Oh Shit", a 1989 song by KMFDM from Don't Blow Your Top (album)
- "Oh Shit", a 1992 song by the Pharcyde from Bizarre Ride II the Pharcyde
- "Oh Shit!!!", a 2016 song by Injury Reserve from Floss (mixtape)
- "Oh Shit!", a level from the 2023 video game Pizza Tower

== See also ==
- Shit (disambiguation)
- Holy shit (disambiguation)
- "Aw Shit", a 2014 song by Wiz Khalifa from 28 Grams
- Oh Sit!, a 2010s American game show
- Oh Shoot, a 1921 novel by Rex Beach
