= Baye Kola =

Baye Kola or Baye Kala (Persian: بايع كلا) may refer to:

- Baye Kola, Neka
- Baye Kola, Savadkuh
