= Chenar Bon, Neka =

Village in Mazandaran province, Iran

Chenar Bon Persian: چناربن
- Village
- Location within Iran
- Coordinates: 36°40′00″N 53°19′45″E
- Country: Iran
- Province: Mazandaran
- County: Neka
- District: Central
- Rural District: Mehravan

Population (2016)
  - Total: 559
- Time zone: UTC+3:30 (IRST)

Chenar Bon (Persian: چناربن) (Note: Also romanized as Chenār Bon) is a village in Mehravan Rural District of the Central District in Neka County, Mazandaran province, Iran.

== Demographics ==
=== Population ===
At the time of the 2006 National Census, the village's population was 601 in 144 households. The following census in 2011 counted 529 people in 158 households. The 2016 census measured the population of the village as 559 people in 177 households.
