= Maras-e Bozorg =

Maras-e Bozorg مرس بزرگ
- Village
- Location within Iran
- Coordinates: 36°22′50″N 53°34′08″E
- Country: Iran
- Province: Mazandaran
- County: Neka
- Bakhsh: Hezarjarib
- Rural District: Estakhr-e Posht

Population (2016)
  - Total: 176
- Time zone: UTC+3:30 (IRST)

Maras-e Bozorg (Persian: مرس بزرگ, also Romanized as Maras Bozorg and Mares Bozorg; also known as Marest-e Bozorg) is a village in Estakhr-e Posht Rural District, Hezarjarib District, Neka County, Mazandaran Province, Iran. At the 2016 census, its population was 176, in 63 families. Up from 130 in 2006.
