= Shir Kola, Neka =

Shir Kola شيركلا
- Village
- Location within Iran
- Coordinates: 36°32′14″N 53°36′55″E
- Country: Iran
- Province: Mazandaran
- County: Neka
- Bakhsh: Hezarjarib
- Rural District: Zarem Rud

Population (2016)
  - Total: 182
- Time zone: UTC+3:30 (IRST)

Shir Kola (Persian: شيركلا, also Romanized as Shīr Kolā and Shīrkalā) is a village in Zarem Rud Rural District, Hezarjarib District, Neka County, Mazandaran Province, Iran. At the 2016 census, its population was 182, in 63 families. Down from 275 people in 2006.
