= Chenar Bon, Hezarjarib =

Chenar Bon چناربن
- Village
- Location within Iran
- Coordinates: 36°25′39″N 53°44′20″E
- Country: Iran
- Province: Mazandaran
- County: Neka
- Bakhsh: Hezarjarib
- Rural District: Zarem Rud

Population (2016)
  - Total: 245
- Time zone: UTC+3:30 (IRST)

Chenar Bon (Persian: چناربن, also Romanized as Chenār Bon; also known as Chenār Bon-e Zārem Rūd) is a village in Zarem Rud Rural District, Hezarjarib District, Neka County, Mazandaran Province, Iran. At the 2006 census, its population was 342, in 89 families. In 2016, its population was 245, in 99 households.
