= Deram =

Deram may refer to:

- Deram Records, a former subsidiary record label established in 1966 by Decca Records in the United Kingdom
- Đeram or Stari Đeram, a district of Belgrade, Serbia
- Darram or Derām, a village in Iran
- Deram, Mazandaran, a village in Iran
- Dirhami, village in Estonia also known as Deram and Derhamn
