= Shir Kola =

Shir Kola or Shirkala (Persian: شيركلا) may refer to:

- Shir Kola, Neka
- Shir Kola, Nur
- Shir Kola, Savadkuh
