= Valashed =

Valashed ولاشد
- Village
- Location within Iran
- Coordinates: 36°41′26″N 53°18′06″E
- Country: Iran
- Province: Mazandaran
- County: Neka
- Bakhsh: Central
- Rural District: Qareh Toghan

Population (2006)
  - Total: 507
- Time zone: UTC+3:30 (IRST)

Valashed (Persian: ولاشد, also Romanized as Valāshed; also known as Valāshed-e Bālā) is a village in Qareh Toghan Rural District, in the Central District of Neka County, Mazandaran Province, Iran. At the 2016 census, its population was 481, in 157 families. Down from 507 in 2006.
