= Lak Tarashan, Neka =

Lak Tarashan لاک تراشان
- Village
- Location within Iran
- Coordinates: 36°41′30″N 53°21′53″E
- Country: Iran
- Province: Mazandaran
- County: Neka
- Bakhsh: Central
- Rural District: Mehravan

Population (2016)
  - Total: 296
- Time zone: UTC+3:30 (IRST)

Lak Tarashan (Persian: لاک تراشان, also Romanized as Lāk Tarāshān) is a village in Mehravan Rural District, in the Central District of Neka County, Mazandaran Province, Iran. At the 2016 census, its population was 296, in 93 families. Up from 284 in 2006.
