= Eyu (disambiguation) =

Eyu or EYU nay refer to:

- Estonian Yachting Union
- Eyū, an alternate name for Mohsenabad, Mazandaran, a village in Zarem Rud Rural District, Hezarjarib District, Neka County
- Model numbers for the Surface Pen
