= Siavash Kola, Neka =

Siavash Kola سياوش كلا
- Village
- Location within Iran
- Coordinates: 36°40′41″N 53°17′12″E
- Country: Iran
- Province: Mazandaran
- County: Neka
- Bakhsh: Central
- Rural District: Qareh Toghan

Population (2016)
  - Total: 857
- Time zone: UTC+3:30 (IRST)

Siavash Kola (Persian: سياوش كلا, also Romanized as Sīāvash Kolā, Seyāvash Kolā, and Sīāvosh Kalā; also known as Sīāvash Kūlā) is a village in Qareh Toghan Rural District, in the Central District of Neka County, Mazandaran Province, Iran. At the 2016 census, its population was 857, in 262 families. Up from 756 people in 2006.
