= Arim =

Arim (Persian: اريم) may refer to:

- Arim, Neka
- Arim, Savadkuh
