= Dar Mazar, Mazandaran =

Dar Mazar درمزار
- Village
- Location within Iran
- Coordinates: 36°27′22″N 53°51′19″E
- Country: Iran
- Province: Mazandaran
- County: Neka
- Bakhsh: Hezarjarib
- Rural District: Zarem Rud

Population (2016)
  - Total: 68
- Time zone: UTC+3:30 (IRST)

Dar Mazar (Persian: درمزار, also Romanized as Dar Mazār and Darmezār) is a village in Zarem Rud Rural District, Hezarjarib District, Neka County, Mazandaran Province, Iran. At the 2016 census, its population was 68, in 28 families. Down from 101 people in 2006.
