= Gelvard-e Bozorg =

Gelvard-e Bozorg گلورد بزرگ
- Village
- Location within Iran
- Coordinates: 36°35′07″N 53°35′20″E
- Country: Iran
- Province: Mazandaran
- County: Neka
- Bakhsh: Central
- Rural District: Peyrajeh

Population (2016)
  - Total: 207
- Time zone: UTC+3:30 (IRST)

Gelvard-e Bozorg (Persian: گلوردبزرگ, also Romanized as Gelvard-e Bozorg; also known as Gīlavard Bozorg, and Gīlavard-e Bozorg) is a village in Peyrajeh Rural District, in the Central District of Neka County, Mazandaran Province, Iran.

At the time of the 2006 National Census, the village's population was 120 in 34 households. The following census in 2011 counted 202 people in 56 households. The 2016 census measured the population of the village as 207 people in 62 households.
