= Dang Sarak, Neka =

Village in Mazandaran province, Iran

Dang Sarak Persian: دنگ سرک
- Village
- Location within Iran
- Coordinates: 36°47′34″N 53°14′46″E
- Country: Iran
- Province: Mazandaran
- County: Neka
- District: Central
- Rural District: Qareh Toghan

Population (2016)
  - Total: 2,024
- Time zone: UTC+3:30 (IRST)

Dang Sarak (Persian: دنگ سرک) (Note: Also romanized as Dengesarak; also known as Dengesarak-e Yek) is a village in Qareh Toghan Rural District of the Central District in Neka County, Mazandaran province, Iran.

== Demographics ==
=== Population ===
At the time of the 2006 National Census, the village's population was 2,008 in 577 households. The following census in 2011 counted 1,739 people in 560 households. The 2016 census measured the population of the village as 2,024 people in 682 households.
