= Tazehabad-e Bostan Kheyl =

Village in Mazandaran, Iran

Tazehabad-e Bostan Kheyl تازه آباد بستان خيل
- Village
- Location within Iran
- Coordinates: 36°41′15″N 53°16′18″E
- Country: Iran
- Province: Mazandaran
- County: Neka
- Bakhsh: Central
- Rural District: Qareh Toghan

Population (2006)
  - Total: 357
- Time zone: UTC+3:30 (IRST)

Tazehabad-e Bostan Kheyl (Persian: تازه آباد بستان خيل, also Romanized as Tāzehābād-e Bostān Kheyl; also known as Tāzehābād) is a village in Qareh Toghan Rural District, in the Central District of Neka County, Mazandaran Province, Iran. At the 2016 census, its population was 319, in 106 families. Down from 357 in 2006.
