= Baye Kola, Neka =

Baye Kola بايع كلا
- Village
- Location within Iran
- Coordinates: 36°44′03″N 53°14′37″E
- Country: Iran
- Province: Mazandaran
- County: Neka
- Bakhsh: Central
- Rural District: Qareh Toghan

Population (2006)
  - Total: 1,101
- Time zone: UTC+3:30 (IRST)

Baye Kola (Persian: بايع كلا, also Romanized as Bāye’ Kolā, Bāye‘ Kolā, and Bāye’ Kalā) is a village in Qareh Toghan Rural District, in the Central District of Neka County, Mazandaran Province, Iran. At the 2016 census, its population was 981, in 338 families. Down from 1,101 people in 2006.
