= Chalmardi =

Village in Mazandaran province, Iran

Chalmardi Persian: چلمردی
- Village
- Location within Iran
- Coordinates: 36°33′42″N 53°23′31″E
- Country: Iran
- Province: Mazandaran
- County: Neka
- District: Hezarjarib
- Rural District: Zarem Rud

Population (2016)
  - Total: 1,184
- Time zone: UTC+3:30 (IRST)

Chalmardi (Persian: چلمردی) (Note: Also romanized as Chalmardī) is a village in Zarem Rud Rural District of Hezarjarib District in Neka County, Mazandaran province, Iran, serving as capital of the district.

== Demographics ==
=== Population ===
At the time of the 2006 National Census, the village's population was 1,205 in 274 households. The following census in 2011 counted 1,262 people in 368 households. The 2016 census measured the population of the village as 1,184 people in 362 households, the most populous in its rural district.
