= Latergaz-e Sofla =

Latergaz-e Sofla لترگاز سفلی
- Village
- Location within Iran
- Coordinates: 36°29′40″N 53°52′05″E
- Country: Iran
- Province: Mazandaran
- County: Neka
- Bakhsh: Hezarjarib
- Rural District: Zarem Rud

Population (2016)
  - Total: 23
- Time zone: UTC+3:30 (IRST)

Latergaz-e Sofla (Persian: لترگاز سفلی, also Romanized as Latergāz-e Soflá; also known as Rudbar-e Latergāz) is a village in Zarem Rud Rural District, Hezarjarib District, Neka County, Mazandaran Province, Iran. At the 2006 census, its population was 23, in 8 families. Decreased from 49 people in 2006.
