= Zarandin-e Olya =

Village in Mazandaran province, Iran

Zarandin-e Olya Persian: زرندين عليا
- Village
- Location within Iran
- Coordinates: 36°35′54″N 53°20′31″E
- Country: Iran
- Province: Mazandaran
- County: Neka
- District: Central
- Rural District: Peyrajeh

Population (2016)
  - Total: 748
- Time zone: UTC+3:30 (IRST)

Zarandin-e Olya (Persian: زرندين عليا) (Note: Also romanized as Zarandīn-e ‘Olyā; also known as Bālā Zarandīn and Zarandīn-e Bālā) is a village in Peyrajeh Rural District of the Central District in Neka County, Mazandaran province, Iran.

== Demographics ==
=== Population ===
At the time of the 2006 National Census, the village's population was 740 in 171 households. The following census in 2011 counted 809 people in 240 households. The 2016 census measured the population of the village as 748 people in 237 households.
