= Latergaz-e Olya =

Latergaz-e Olya لترگاز عليا
- Village
- Location within Iran
- Coordinates: 36°27′46″N 53°51′16″E
- Country: Iran
- Province: Mazandaran
- County: Neka
- Bakhsh: Hezarjarib
- Rural District: Zarem Rud

Population (2016)
  - Total: 69
- Time zone: UTC+3:30 (IRST)

Latergaz-e Olya (Persian: لترگاز عليا, also Romanized as Latergāz-e ‘Olyā; also known as Latergāz) is a village in Zarem Rud Rural District, Hezarjarib District, Neka County, Mazandaran Province, Iran. At the 2016 census, its population was 69, in 19 families. Up from 47 people in 2006.
