= Dang Sarak =

Dang Sarak or Dangsarak or Dengesarak (Persian: دنگ سرك) may refer to:

- Dang Sarak, Neka
- Dangsarak, Sari
