= Arim, Neka =

Arim آريم
- Village
- Location within Iran
- Coordinates: 36°28′45″N 53°26′21″E
- Country: Iran
- Province: Mazandaran
- County: Neka
- Bakhsh: Hezarjarib
- Rural District: Estakhr-e Posht

Population (2016)
  - Total: 74
- Time zone: UTC+3:30 (IRST)

Historical population
Year	Pop.	±%
2006	113	—
2016	76	−32.7%

Arim (Persian: آريم, also Romanized as Arīm and Areyīm and Ārīm) is a village in Estakhr-e Posht Rural District, Hezarjarib District, Neka County, Mazandaran Province, Iran. At the 2016 census, its population was 74, in 30 families. Its population decreased from 113 in 2006.
