= Lai-ye Rudbar =

Lai-ye Rudbar لايي رودبار
- Village
- Location within Iran
- Coordinates: 36°29′09″N 53°38′29″E
- Country: Iran
- Province: Mazandaran
- County: Neka
- Bakhsh: Hezarjarib
- Rural District: Zarem Rud

Population (2016)
  - Total: 260
- Time zone: UTC+3:30 (IRST)

Lai-ye Rudbar (Persian: لايي رودبار, also Romanized as Lā’ī-ye Rūdbār, Lā’ī Rūdbār and Lāy-e Rūdbār) is a village in Zarem Rud Rural District, Hezarjarib District, Neka County, Mazandaran Province, Iran. At the 2016 census, its population was 260, in 99 families.
