= Shit, Mazandaran =

Village in Mazandaran province, Iran

Shit Persian: شيت
- Village
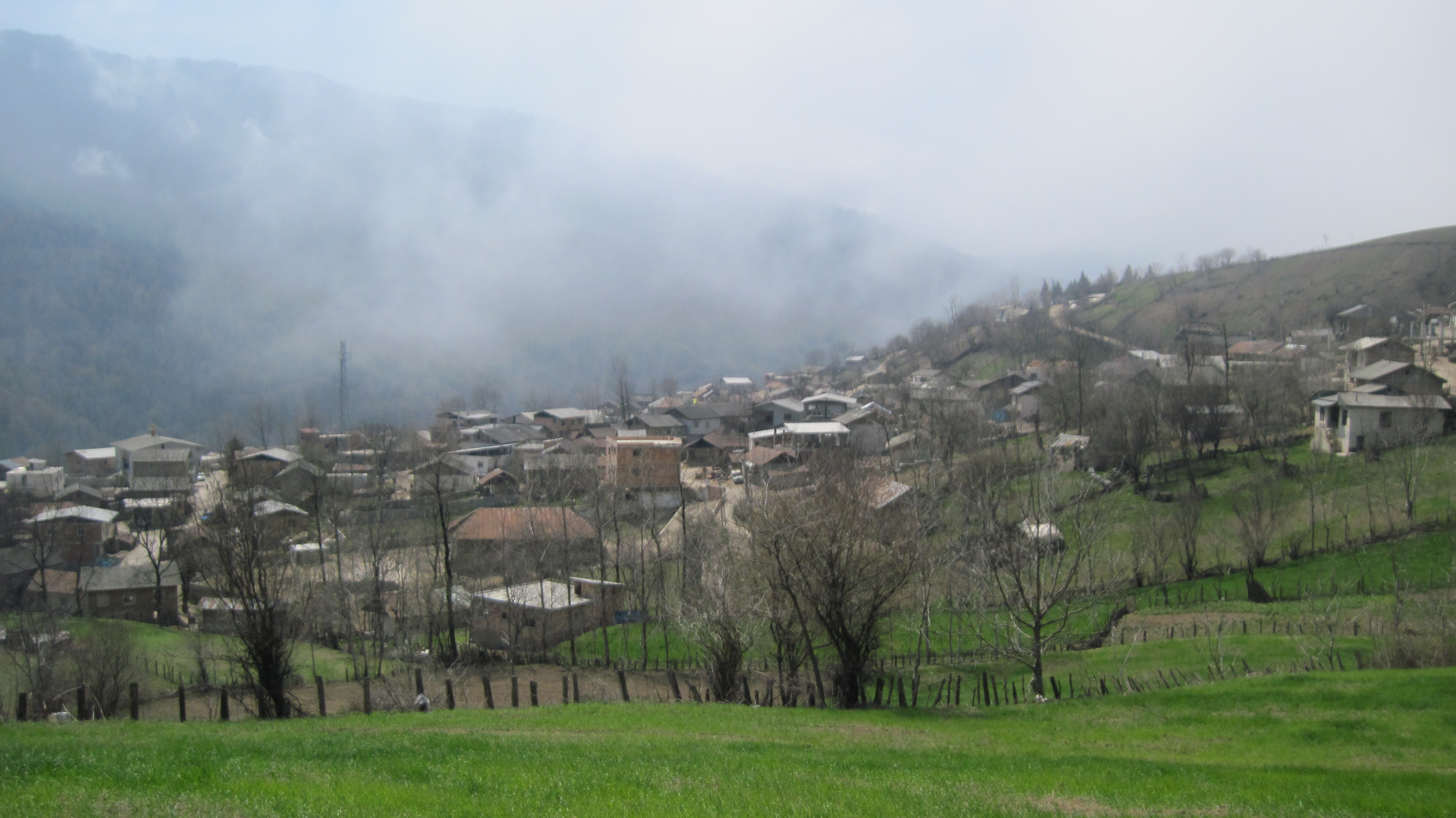
- The village of Shit

- Location within Iran
- Coordinates: 36°28′41″N 53°33′28″E
- Country: Iran
- Province: Mazandaran
- County: Neka
- District: Hezarjarib
- Rural District: Estakhr-e Posht

Population (2016)
  - Total: 959
- Time zone: UTC+3:30 (IRST)

Shit (Persian: شيت) (Note: Also romanized as Shīt) is a village in Estakhr-e Posht Rural District of Hezarjarib District in Neka County, Mazandaran province, Iran.

== Demographics ==
=== Population ===
At the time of the 2006 National Census, the village's population was 948 in 180 households. The following census in 2011 counted 1,307 people in 337 households. The 2016 census measured the population of the village as 959 people in 279 households, the most populous in its rural district.

== See also ==
- Unusual place names
