= Molla Kheyl-e Purva =

Village in Mazandaran province, Iran

Molla Kheyl-e Purva Persian: ملاخيل پوروا
- Village
- Location within Iran
- Coordinates: 36°30′20″N 53°29′03″E
- Country: Iran
- Province: Mazandaran
- County: Neka
- District: Hezarjarib
- Rural District: Zarem Rud

Population (2016)
  - Total: 670
- Time zone: UTC+3:30 (IRST)

Molla Kheyl-e Purva (Persian: ملاخيل پوروا) (Note: Also romanized as Mollā Kheyl-e Pūrvā; also known as Mollā Kheyl and Mollā Khīl) is a village in Zarem Rud Rural District of Hezarjarib District in Neka County, Mazandaran province, Iran.

== Demographics ==
=== Population ===
At the time of the 2006 National Census, the village's population was 610 in 148 households. The following census in 2011 counted 770 people in 217 households. The 2016 census measured the population of the village as 670 people in 211 households.
