= Lai-ye Pasand =

Lai-ye Pasand لايی پاسند
- Village
- Location within Iran
- Coordinates: 36°31′35″N 53°37′59″E
- Country: Iran
- Province: Mazandaran
- County: Neka
- Bakhsh: Hezarjarib
- Rural District: Zarem Rud

Population (2016)
  - Total: 204
- Time zone: UTC+3:30 (IRST)

Lai-ye Pasand (Persian: لايی پاسند, also Romanized as Lā’ī-ye Pāsand; also known as Pāsand) is a village in Zarem Rud Rural District, Hezarjarib District, Neka County, Mazandaran Province, Iran. At the 2016 census, its population was 204, in 67 families. Up from 196 in 2006.
