= Maras-e Kuchak =

Maras-e Kuchak مرس کوچک
- Village
- Location within Iran
- Coordinates: 36°23′44″N 53°35′19″E
- Country: Iran
- Province: Mazandaran
- County: Neka
- Bakhsh: Hezarjarib
- Rural District: Estakhr-e Posht

Population (2016)
  - Total: 91
- Time zone: UTC+3:30 (IRST)

Maras-e Kuchak (Persian: مرس کوچک, also Romanized as Maras-e Kūchak and Maras-e Kuchek; also known as Marest-e Kūchak) is a village in Estakhr-e Posht Rural District, Hezarjarib District, Neka County, Mazandaran Province, Iran. At the 2016 census, its population was 91, in 31 families.
