= Azrak =

Azrak (Persian: ازرك) may refer to:

- Azrak, Khuzestan
- Azrak, Mazandaran
