= Qareh Toghan Rural District =

Rural district in Mazandaran province, Iran

Qareh Toghan Rural District Persian: دهستان قره طغان
- Rural District
- Location within Iran
- Coordinates: 36°44′N 53°16′E
- Country: Iran
- Province: Mazandaran
- County: Neka
- District: Central
- Established: 1987
- Capital: Tus Kola

Population (2016)
  - Total: 21,510
- Time zone: UTC+3:30 (IRST)

Qareh Toghan Rural District (Persian: دهستان قره طغان) is in the Central District of Neka County, Mazandaran province, Iran. Its capital is the village of Tus Kola.

== Demographics ==
=== Population ===
At the time of the 2006 National Census, the rural district's population was 21,747 in 5,667 households. There were 21,181 inhabitants in 6,308 households at the following census of 2011. The 2016 census measured the population of the rural district as 21,510 in 6,949 households. The most populous of its 26 villages was Khvorshid, with 2,293 people.

=== Other settlements in the rural district ===
- Alukandeh
- Army Beach, Mazandaran
- Atrab
- Baye Kola
- Behzad Kola
- Chaman
- Dang Sarak
- Dowqanlu
- Emamiyeh
- Esmail Aqa Mahalleh
- Gilabad
- Hajji Mahalleh
- Nim Chah
- Now Dehak
- Nowzarabad
- Shahab ol Din
- Shahid Abbaspour residental complex
- Siavash Kola
- Tazehabad Kola
- Tazehabad-e Bostan Kheyl
- Valashed
- Valashed-e Pain
