= Zarem Rud Rural District =

Rural district in Mazandaran province, Iran

Zarem Rud Rural District Persian: دهستان زارم رود
- Rural District
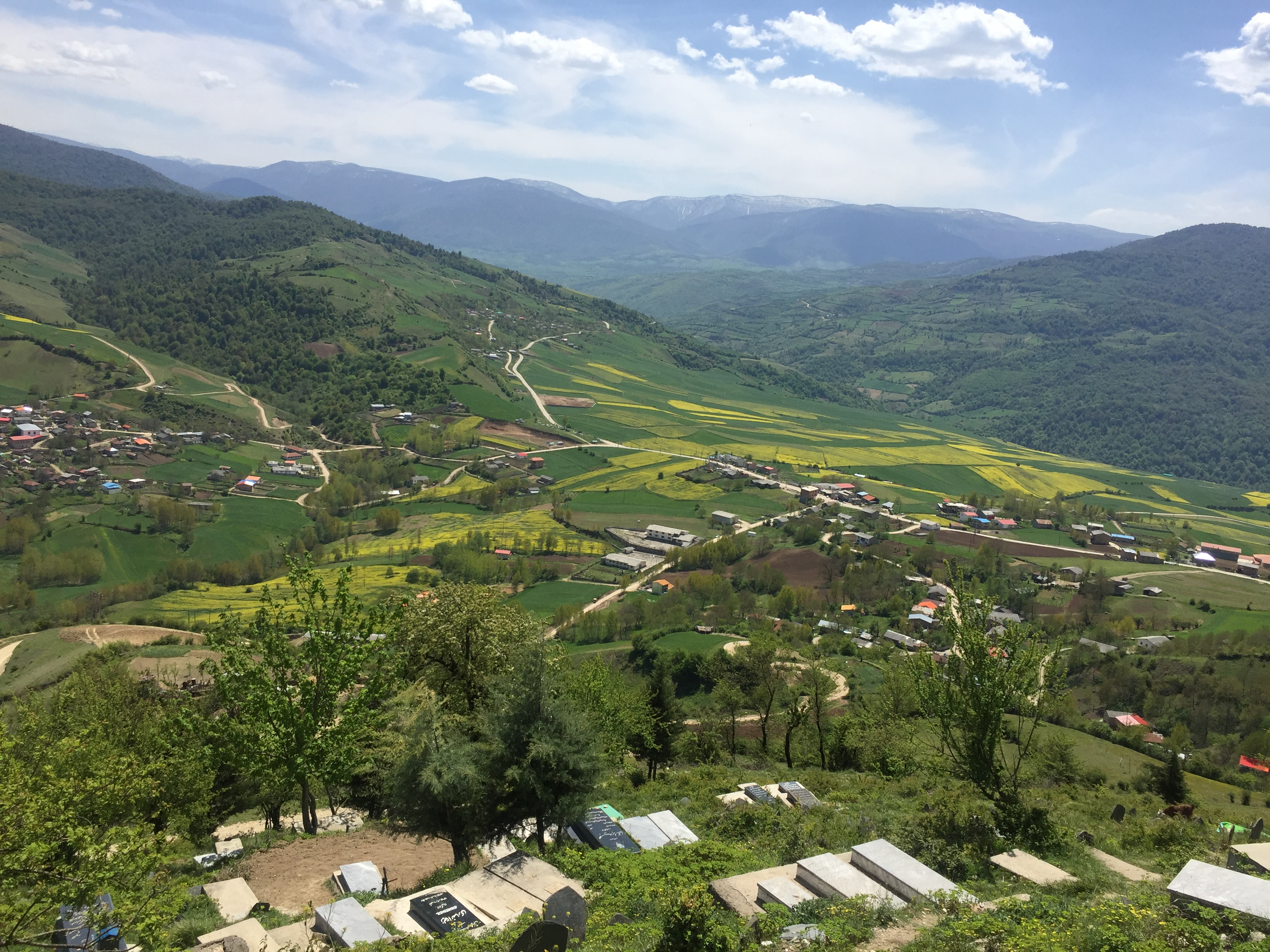
- The village of Ziarat Kola

- Location within Iran
- Coordinates: 36°29′N 53°41′E
- Country: Iran
- Province: Mazandaran
- County: Neka
- District: Hezarjarib
- Established: 1987
- Capital: Ziarat Kola

Population (2016)
  - Total: 8,370
- Time zone: UTC+3:30 (IRST)

Zarem Rud Rural District (Persian: دهستان زارم رود) is in Hezarjarib District of Neka County, Mazandaran province, Iran. Its capital is the village of Ziarat Kola.

== Demographics ==
=== Population ===
At the time of the 2006 National Census, the rural district's population was 8,888 in 2,222 households. There were 9,217 inhabitants in 2,664 households at the following census of 2011. The 2016 census measured the population of the rural district as 8,370 in 2,689 households. The most populous of its 44 villages was Chalmardi, with 1,184 people.

=== Other villages in the rural district ===
- Ab Chin
- Akerd
- Arzak
- Badabsar
- Band-e Bon
- Berma-ye Zarem Rud
- Chamaz Deh
- Chenar Bon
- Dar Mazar
- Darvishan
- Farimak
- Hoseynabad
- Kafkur
- Kheyrabad
- Kola Rudbar
- Kordab
- Lai-ye Pasand
- Lai-ye Rudbar
- Latergaz-e Olya
- Latergaz-e Sofla
- Limundeh
- Mohsenabad
- Molla Kheyl-e Lai
- Molla Kheyl-e Purva
- Now Deh
- Purva
- Safal Mian
- Seyyed Kheyl
- Shir Kola
- Surak
- Suteh Kheyl
- Tajar Kheyl
- Valadimeh
- Valamdeh
- Varfam
- Vavodin
- Zanget-e Olya
- Zanget-e Sofla
- Zerum
