= Mehravan Rural District =

Rural district in Mazandaran province, Iran

Mehravan Rural District Persian: دهستان مهروان
- Rural District
- Location within Iran
- Coordinates: 36°42′N 53°21′E
- Country: Iran
- Province: Mazandaran
- County: Neka
- District: Central
- Established: 1987
- Capital: Gel Kheyl

Population (2016)
  - Total: 10,576
- Time zone: UTC+3:30 (IRST)

Mehravan Rural District (Persian: دهستان مهروان) is in the Central District of Neka County, Mazandaran province, Iran. Its capital is the village of Gel Kheyl.

== Demographics ==
=== Population ===
At the time of the 2006 National Census, the rural district's population was 10,884 in 2,681 households. There were 10,793 inhabitants in 3,167 households at the following census of 2011. The 2016 census measured the population of the rural district as 10,576 in 3,421 households. The most populous of its 18 villages was Chalu Pol, with 2,110 people.

=== Other villages in the rural district ===
- Abelu
- Ajand
- Chenar Bon
- Chupan Boneh-ye Ajand
- Darzi Mahalleh
- Dowr Ab
- Eskardin
- Gol Chal Sar
- Khaneh Sar
- Kolet
- Komishan
- Lak Tarashan
- Mellij Galleh
- Mian Galleh
- Nedaf Kheyl
- Shur Ab Sar
