= Estakhr-e Posht Rural District =

Rural district in Mazandaran province, Iran

Estakhr-e Posht Rural District Persian: دهستان استخرپشت
- Rural District
- Location within Iran
- Coordinates: 36°23′N 53°36′E
- Country: Iran
- Province: Mazandaran
- County: Neka
- District: Hezarjarib
- Established: 1987
- Capital: Estakhr-e Posht

Population (2016)
  - Total: 5,035
- Time zone: UTC+3:30 (IRST)

Estakhr-e Posht Rural District (Persian: دهستان استخرپشت) is in Hezarjarib District of Neka County, Mazandaran province, Iran. Its capital is the village of Estakhr-e Posht.

== Demographics ==
=== Population ===
At the time of the 2006 National Census, the rural district's population was 5,277 in 1,218 households. There were 6,489 inhabitants in 1,714 households at the following census of 2011. The 2016 census measured the population of the rural district as 5,035 in 1,593 households. The most populous of its 23 villages was Shit, with 959 people.

=== Other villages in the rural district ===
- Arim
- Charmi
- Darzi Kola
- Deram
- Eram
- Esmail Mahalleh
- Hoseynabad
- Ivim
- Kachab Mahalleh
- Kafarat
- Maras-e Bozorg
- Maras-e Kuchak
- Pajat
- Rudbar Mahalleh
- Sangar
- Saram
- Sefid Kuh
- Sika
- Suchelma
- Talam
