= Zanget-e Olya =

Zanget-e Olya زنگت عليا
- Village
- Location within Iran
- Coordinates: 36°27′55″N 53°47′46″E
- Country: Iran
- Province: Mazandaran
- County: Neka
- Bakhsh: Hezarjarib
- Rural District: Zarem Rud

Population (2016)
  - Total: 31
- Time zone: UTC+3:30 (IRST)

Zanget-e Olya (Persian: زنگت عليا, also Romanized as Zanget-e ‘Olyā; also known as Bālā Zanger, Bālā Zanget, and Zanget-e Bālā) is a village in Zarem Rud Rural District, Hezarjarib District, Neka County, Mazandaran Province, Iran. At the 2016 census, its population was 31, in 12 families. Decreased from 67 people in 2006.
