= Molla Kheyl-e Lai =

Molla Kheyl-e Lai ملاخيل لايی
- Village
- Location within Iran
- Coordinates: 36°30′34″N 53°39′48″E
- Country: Iran
- Province: Mazandaran
- County: Neka
- Bakhsh: Hezarjarib
- Rural District: Zarem Rud

Population (2006)
  - Total: 147
- Time zone: UTC+3:30 (IRST)

Molla Kheyl-e Lai (Persian: ملاخيل لایی, also Romanized as Mollā Kheyl-e Lā’ī; also known as Lā’ī Mollā Kheyl and Mollā Kheyl) is a village in Zarem Rud Rural District, Hezarjarib District, Neka County, Mazandaran Province, Iran. At the 2016 census, its population was 103 in 37 families. Down from 147 people in 2006.
