= Peyrajeh Rural District =

Rural district in Mazandaran province, Iran

Peyrajeh Rural District Persian: دهستان پي رجه
- Rural District
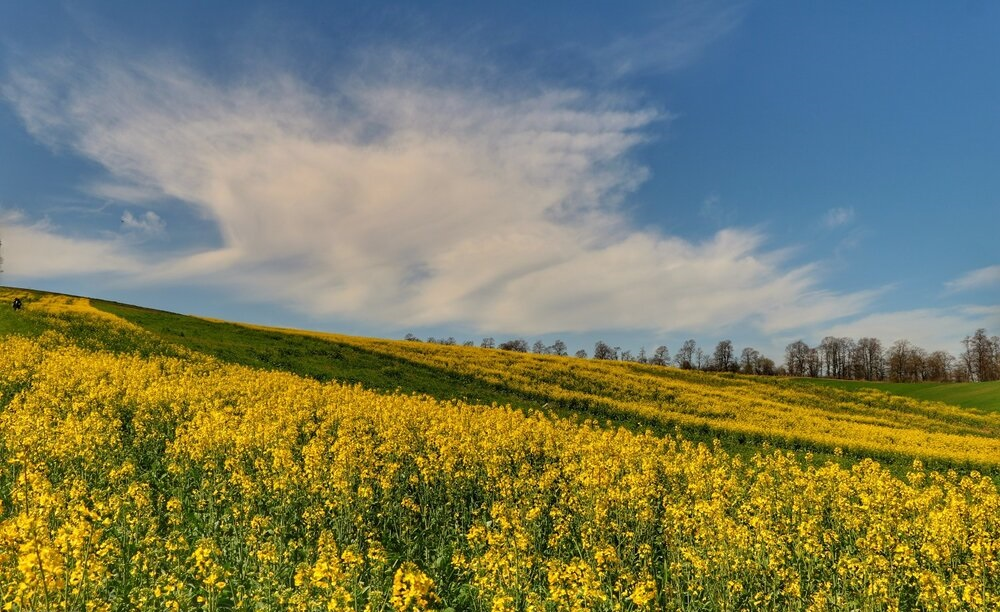
- Rapeseed farm in Peyrajeh Rural District

- Location within Iran
- Coordinates: 36°35′N 53°27′E
- Country: Iran
- Province: Mazandaran
- County: Neka
- District: Central
- Established: 1987
- Capital: Zarandin-e Sofla

Population (2016)
  - Total: 13,029
- Time zone: UTC+3:30 (IRST)

Peyrajeh Rural District (Persian: دهستان پي رجه) is in the Central District of Neka County, Mazandaran province, Iran. Its capital is the village of Zarandin-e Sofla.

== Demographics ==
=== Population ===
At the time of the 2006 National Census, the rural district's population was 11,805 in 2,994 households. There were 13,584 inhabitants in 3,987 households at the following census of 2011. The 2016 census measured the population of the rural district as 13,029 in 4,169 households. The most populous of its 23 villages was Gol Bestan, with 3,114 people.

=== Other villages in the rural district ===
- Band-e Beni
- Berijan
- Darvish Khalak
- Do Ab
- Gelvard-e Bozorg
- Gelvard-e Kuchek
- Gorg Taj
- Kar Kam
- Khorram Chammaz
- Kuhsar Kandeh
- Lak Tarash
- Lalard
- Owkreka
- Owmal
- Qaleh Sar-e Olya
- Ramadan Kheyl
- Seh Kileh
- Valiji Mahalleh
- Yaqub Mahalleh
- Zarandin-e Olya
