= Pajat, Mazandaran =

Village in Mazandaran province, Iran

Pajat Persian: پجت
- Village
- Location within Iran
- Coordinates: 36°25′57″N 53°31′38″E
- Country: Iran
- Province: Mazandaran
- County: Neka
- District: Hezarjarib
- Rural District: Estakhr-e Posht

Population (2016)
  - Total: 271
- Time zone: UTC+3:30 (IRST)

Pajat (Persian: پجت) (Note: Also romanized as Pajet; also known as Pachat) is a village in Estakhr-e Posht Rural District of Hezarjarib District in Neka County, Mazandaran province, Iran.

== Demographics ==
=== Population ===
At the time of the 2006 National Census, the village's population was 311 in 82 households. The following census in 2011 counted 345 people in 99 households. The 2016 census measured the population of the village as 271 people in 81 households.
