= Deram, Mazandaran =

Deram درم
- Village
- Location within Iran
- Coordinates: 36°27′56″N 53°29′37″E
- Country: Iran
- Province: Mazandaran
- County: Neka
- Bakhsh: Hezarjarib
- Rural District: Estakhr-e Posht

Population (2016)
  - Total: 91
- Time zone: UTC+3:30 (IRST)

Deram (Persian: درم, also Romanized as Daram) is a village in Estakhr-e Posht Rural District, Hezarjarib District, Neka County, Mazandaran Province, Iran. At the 2016 census, its population was 91, in 31 families. Up from 82 in 2006.
