= Zanget-e Sofla =

Zanget-e Sofla زنگت سفلی
- Village
- Location within Iran
- Coordinates: 36°27′17″N 53°48′32″E
- Country: Iran
- Province: Mazandaran
- County: Neka
- Bakhsh: Hezarjarib
- Rural District: Zarem Rud

Population (2016)
  - Total: 77
- Time zone: UTC+3:30 (IRST)

Zanget-e Sofla (Persian: زنگت سفلی, also Romanized as Zanget-e Soflá; also known as Pā’īn Zanger, Pā’īn Zanget, and Zanget-e Pā’īn) is a village in Zarem Rud Rural District, Hezarjarib District, Neka County, Mazandaran Province, Iran. At the 2016 census, its population was 77, in 30 families. Up from 57 in 2006.
