= Shit-e Kamarzard =

Shit-e Kamarzard شيت كمرزرد
- Village
- Location within Iran
- Coordinates: 34°03′14″N 46°50′13″E
- Country: Iran
- Province: Kermanshah
- County: Eslamabad-e Gharb
- Bakhsh: Central
- Rural District: Hasanabad

Population (2006)
  - Total: 322
- Time zone: UTC+3:30 (IRST)

Shit-e Kamarzard (Persian: شيت كمرزرد, also Romanized as Shīt-e Kamarzard; also known as Shīţ) is a village in Hasanabad Rural District, in the Central District of Eslamabad-e Gharb County, Kermanshah Province, Iran. At the 2006 census, its population was 322, in 67 families.
