= Lakterashan, Tonekabon =

Lakterashan لاكتراشان
- Village
- Location within Iran
- Coordinates: 36°40′31″N 50°35′19″E
- Country: Iran
- Province: Mazandaran
- County: Tonekabon
- Bakhsh: Central
- Rural District: Goli Jan

Population (2016)
  - Total: 56
- Time zone: UTC+3:30 (IRST)

Lakterashan (Persian: لاكتراشان, also Romanized as Lākterāshān and Lāk Tarāshān) is a village in Goli Jan Rural District, in the Central District of Tonekabon County, Mazandaran Province, Iran.

At the time of the 2006 National Census, the village's population was 167 in 44 households. The following census in 2011 counted 131 people in 38 households. The 2016 census measured 56 people in 19 households.
