= Chenar Bon, Babol =

Chenar Bon چناربن
- Village
- Location within Iran
- Coordinates: 36°28′14″N 52°32′30″E
- Country: Iran
- Province: Mazandaran
- County: Babol
- Bakhsh: Lalehabad
- Rural District: Lalehabad

Population (2006)
  - Total: 562
- Time zone: UTC+3:30 (IRST)
  - Summer (DST): UTC+4:30 (IRDT)

Chenar Bon (Persian: چناربن, also Romanized as Chenār Bon; also known as Chenarbend and Chenār Bon-e Yūr Maḩalleh) is a village in Lalehabad Rural District, Lalehabad District, Babol County, Mazandaran Province, Iran. At the 2006 census, its population was 562, in 147 families.
