= Pachat-e Delita =

Pachat-e Delita پاچات دلي تا
- Village
- Location within Iran
- Coordinates: 31°05′15″N 50°44′34″E
- Country: Iran
- Province: Kohgiluyeh and Boyer-Ahmad
- County: Boyer-Ahmad
- Bakhsh: Ludab
- Rural District: Ludab

Population (2006)
  - Total: 28
- Time zone: UTC+3:30 (IRST)
  - Summer (DST): UTC+4:30 (IRDT)

Pachat-e Delita (Persian: پاچات دلي تا, also Romanized as Pāchāt-e Delītā; also known as Pāchāt) is a village in Ludab Rural District, Ludab District, Boyer-Ahmad County, Kohgiluyeh and Boyer-Ahmad Province, Iran. At the 2006 census, its population was 28, in 7 families.
