= Dar Mazar, Kerman =

Dar Mazar درمزار
- Village
- Location within Iran
- Coordinates: 28°52′00″N 57°41′36″E
- Country: Iran
- Province: Kerman
- County: Jiroft
- Bakhsh: Sarduiyeh
- Rural District: Dalfard

Population (2006)
  - Total: 95
- Time zone: UTC+3:30 (IRST)
  - Summer (DST): UTC+4:30 (IRDT)

Dar Mazar (Persian: درمزار, also Romanized as Dar Mazār and Dar-e Mazār; also known as Darb-e Mazār, Darb-e Mazār-e Sheīkh Bakhtīār, Darbmazār, Darb Mazār-e Sheykh Bakhtīār, Darb Mazar Sheikh Bakhtiyār, and Darīmzār) is a village in Dalfard Rural District, Sarduiyeh District, Jiroft County, Kerman Province, Iran. At the 2006 census, its population was 95, in 30 families.
