= Holy shit =

Holy shit may refer to:

- Holy Shit (band), a 2000s indie rock band formed by Matt Fishbeck and Ariel Pink
- Holy Shit (Living with Lions album), a 2011 album by Living with Lions
- Holy Shit (Nebula album), a 2019 album by Nebula
- "Holy Shit!", a song by Against Me!, from the 2005 album Searching for a Former Clarity
- "Holy Shit", a song by Father John Misty, from the 2015 album I Love You, Honeybear
- "Holy Shit", a song by Moka Only from the album Magickal Weirdness, 2015
- Holy Shit (You've Got to Vote), a 2016 video by Rachel Bloom
- "Holy shit", a vulgar variant of the "holy cow" expression
- "Holy shit", a jocular translation by art historian Cecila Klein of the divine excrement offered in the rites of Aztec goddess Tlazolteotl
- Holy Shit, a 2010 book by Gene Logsdon on the importance of manure in gardening
