= Shithouse (disambiguation) =

Shithouse is a vulgar slang term for an outhouse, but can also be used to refer to an unpleasant situation or something of poor quality.

Shithouse or Shit house may also refer to:

- Gamesmanship, colloquially known as "shithousing" in the United Kingdom
- Shithouse (film), an American film
