= Pachat-e Charbiyun =

Pachat-e Charbiyun پاچات چربيون
- Village
- Location within Iran
- Coordinates: 31°13′59″N 50°42′53″E
- Country: Iran
- Province: Kohgiluyeh and Boyer-Ahmad
- County: Boyer-Ahmad
- Bakhsh: Margown
- Rural District: Zilayi

Population (2006)
  - Total: 26
- Time zone: UTC+3:30 (IRST)
  - Summer (DST): UTC+4:30 (IRDT)

Pachat-e Charbiyun (Persian: پاچات چربيون, also Romanized as Pāchāt-e Charbīyūn; also known as Pāchāt) is a village in Zilayi Rural District, Margown District, Boyer-Ahmad County, Kohgiluyeh and Boyer-Ahmad Province, Iran. At the 2006 census, its population was 26, in 5 families.
