= Chenar Barm-e Olya =

Chenar Barm-e Olya چناربرم عليا
- Village
- Location within Iran
- Coordinates: 30°59′24″N 51°15′11″E
- Country: Iran
- Province: Kohgiluyeh and Boyer-Ahmad
- County: Dana
- Bakhsh: Pataveh
- Rural District: Pataveh

Population (2006)
  - Total: 854
- Time zone: UTC+3:30 (IRST)
  - Summer (DST): UTC+4:30 (IRDT)

Chenar Barm-e Olya (Persian: چناربرم عليا, also Romanized as Chenār Barm-e 'Olyā and Chenār Barm 'Olyā; also known as Chenār Baram-e Bālā, Chenār Barm-e Bālā, and Chenār Bon-e Bālā) is a village in Pataveh Rural District, Pataveh District, Dana County, Kohgiluyeh and Boyer-Ahmad province, Iran. At the 2006 census, its population was 854, in 157 families.
