= Pachat-e Jowkar =

Village in Kohgiluyeh and Boyer-Ahmad, Iran

Pachat-e Jowkar پاچات جوكار
- Village
- Location within Iran
- Coordinates: 31°05′37″N 50°53′33″E
- Country: Iran
- Province: Kohgiluyeh and Boyer-Ahmad
- County: Boyer-Ahmad
- Bakhsh: Margown
- Rural District: Margown

Population (2006)
  - Total: 25
- Time zone: UTC+3:30 (IRST)
  - Summer (DST): UTC+4:30 (IRDT)

Pachat-e Jowkar (Persian: پاچات جوكار, also Romanized as Pāchāt-e Jowkār; also known as Pājāt) is a village in Margown Rural District, Margown District, Boyer-Ahmad County, Kohgiluyeh and Boyer-Ahmad Province, Iran. At the 2006 census, its population was 25, in 4 families.
