= Neka =

City in Mazandaran province, Iran

Neka Persian: نکا
- City
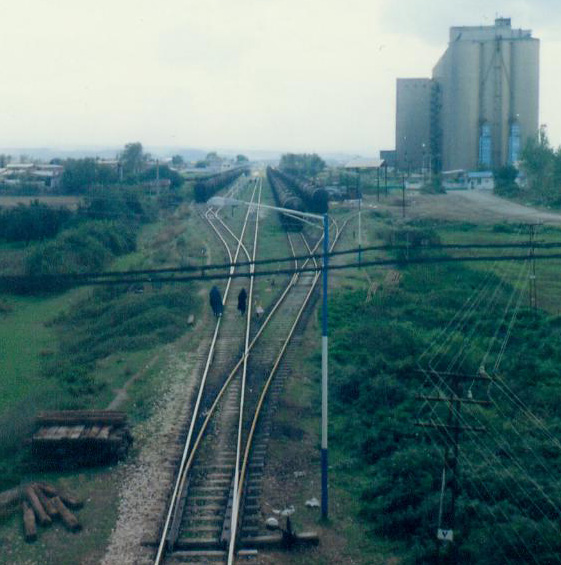
- Neka Railway Station

- Location within Iran
- Coordinates: 36°39′00″N 53°17′50″E
- Country: Iran
- Province: Mazandaran
- County: Neka
- District: Central

Population (2016)
  - Total: 60,991
- Time zone: UTC+3:30 (IRST)

Neka (Persian: نکا) (Note: Also romanized as Nekā' and Nekā; also known as Nīkā; formerly Nāranj Bāgh) is a city in the Central District of Neka County, Mazandaran province, Iran, serving as capital of both the county and the district.

== History ==
Not much is known about this area in geographical or historical accounts of the past, until the Qajar era. However, in the geographical records of the early Islamic period, the name Mirdan of a city near the current city of Neka has been mentioned. Deh Khoda has mentioned the River Neka in his encyclopedia. It seems that Neka was a vicinity or 'block' comprising various rural settlements.

The present Neka has sprung up from the village of Naranj, alongside a bridge on Neka River within the past 70 years.

== Demographics ==
=== Population ===
At the time of the 2006 National Census, the city's population was 46,152 in 11,941 households. The following census in 2011 counted 50,680 people in 14,795 households. The 2016 census measured the population of the city as 60,991 people in 19,357 households.

== Geography ==
Neka is located at the foot of and up into the northern Alborz mountain range, south of and near the Caspian Sea coast. It is close to the city of Behshahr, and 20 kilometres (12 mi) southeast of the coastal city of Sari.

It is noted for its destination spas at natural hot springs, and the nearby Caspian coastline and Peninsula of Miankaleh. It is a tourist destination of Mazandaran province.

== Economy ==
Due to the railway line running across this area, and suitable network of communications, together with the establishment of the wood industry, oil reservoirs and an electric power plant, the area is one of the important developing centers of the province. The said city is also considered as an industrial locality in the northern region

== Neka Power Plant ==
The Neka Power Plant provide energy to the province and some northern parts of the country. It is one of the biggest steam powered thermal power plants in the Middle East, Its nominal capacity is 2035 MW. The main components are: steam pot, middle house, turbine place, converters and auxiliary houses. The main fuel for steam production is natural gas, with light fuel oil a secondary source, both supplied by the Iranian Central Oil Fields Company.

== See also ==
Media related to Neka at Wikimedia Commons
