= Hezarjarib District =

District in Mazandaran province, Iran

Hezarjarib District Persian: بخش هزارجریب
- District
- Location within Iran
- Coordinates: 36°27′N 53°41′E
- Country: Iran
- Province: Mazandaran
- County: Neka
- Established: 1995
- Capital: Chalmardi

Population (2016)
  - Total: 13,405
- Time zone: UTC+3:30 (IRST)

Hezarjarib District (Persian: بخش هزارجریب) is in Neka County, Mazandaran province, Iran. Its capital is the village of Chalmardi.

== Demographics ==
=== Population ===
At the time of the 2006 National Census, the district's population was 14,165 in 3,440 households. The following census in 2011 counted 15,706 people in 4,378 households. The 2016 census measured the population of the district as 13,405 inhabitants in 4,282 households.

=== Administrative divisions ===
Hezarjarib District Population
Administrative Divisions	2006	2011	2016
Estakhr-e Posht RD	5,277	6,489	5,035
Zarem Rud RD	8,888	9,217	8,370
Total	14,165	15,706	13,405
RD = Rural District
