= Central District (Neka County) =

District in Mazandaran province, Iran

Central District (Neka County) Persian: بخش مرکزی شهرستان نکا
- District
- Location within Iran
- Coordinates: 36°41′N 53°22′E
- Country: Iran
- Province: Mazandaran
- County: Neka
- Established: 1995
- Capital: Neka

Population (2016)
  - Total: 106,106
- Time zone: UTC+3:30 (IRST)

The Central District of Neka County (Persian: بخش مرکزی شهرستان نکا) is in Mazandaran province, Iran. Its capital is the city of Neka.

== Demographics ==
=== Population ===
At the time of the 2006 National Census, the district's population was 90,588 in 23,283 households. The following census in 2011 counted 96,238 people in 28,257 households. The 2016 census measured the population of the district as 106,106 inhabitants in 33,896 households.

=== Administrative divisions ===
Central District (Neka County) Population
Administrative Divisions	2006	2011	2016
Mehravan RD	10,884	10,793	10,576
Peyrajeh RD	11,805	13,584	13,029
Qareh Toghan RD	21,747	21,181	21,510
Neka (city)	46,152	50,680	60,991
Total	90,588	96,238	106,106
RD = Rural District
