= Neka County =

County in Mazandaran province, Iran

Neka County Persian: شهرستان نکا
- County
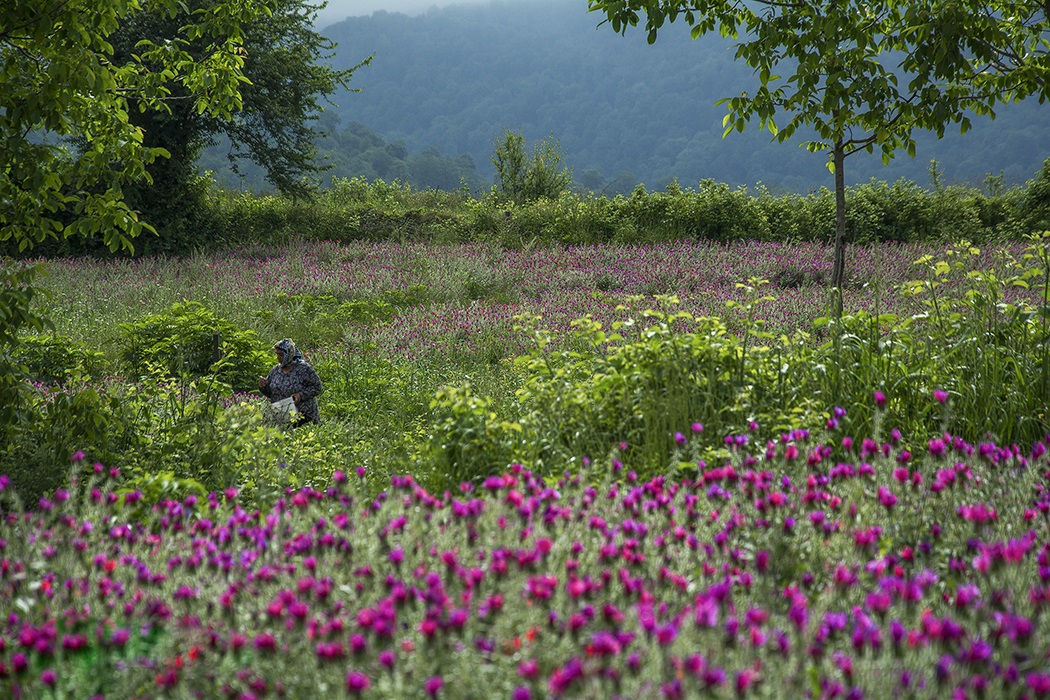
- A field of Echium in Neka County

- Location of Neka County in Mazandaran province (right, green)

- Location of Mazandaran province in Iran
- Coordinates: 36°33′N 53°37′E
- Country: Iran
- Province: Mazandaran
- Established: 1995
- Capital: Neka
- Districts: Central, Hezarjarib

Area
  - Total: 1,358.80 km^{2} (524.64 sq mi)

Population (2016)
  - Total: 119,511
  - Density: 87.9533/km^{2} (227.798/sq mi)
- Time zone: UTC+3:30 (IRST)

Neka County (Persian: شهرستان نکا) is in Mazandaran province, Iran. Its capital is the city of Neka.

== Demographics ==
=== Population ===
At the time of the 2006 National Census, the county's population was 104,753 in 26,723 households. The following census in 2011 counted 111,944 people in 32,613 households. The 2016 census measured the population of the county as 119,511 in 38,178 households.

=== Administrative divisions ===
Neka County's population history and administrative structure over three consecutive censuses are shown in the following table.

Neka County Population
| Administrative Divisions | 2006 | 2011 | 2016 |
|---|---|---|---|
| Central District | 90,588 | 96,238 | 106,106 |
| Mehravan RD | 10,884 | 10,793 | 10,576 |
| Peyrajeh RD | 11,805 | 13,584 | 13,029 |
| Qareh Toghan RD | 21,747 | 21,181 | 21,510 |
| Neka (city) | 46,152 | 50,680 | 60,991 |
| Hezarjarib District | 14,165 | 15,706 | 13,405 |
| Estakhr-e Posht RD | 5,277 | 6,489 | 5,035 |
| Zarem Rud RD | 8,888 | 9,217 | 8,370 |
| Total | 104,753 | 111,944 | 119,511 |
RD = Rural District

== See also ==
Media related to Neka County at Wikimedia Commons
