= Dowlatabad Garden =

UNESCO World Heritage Site in Iran

Coordinates: 31°54′10″N 54°21′08″E

Dowlatabat Garden
UNESCO World Heritage Site
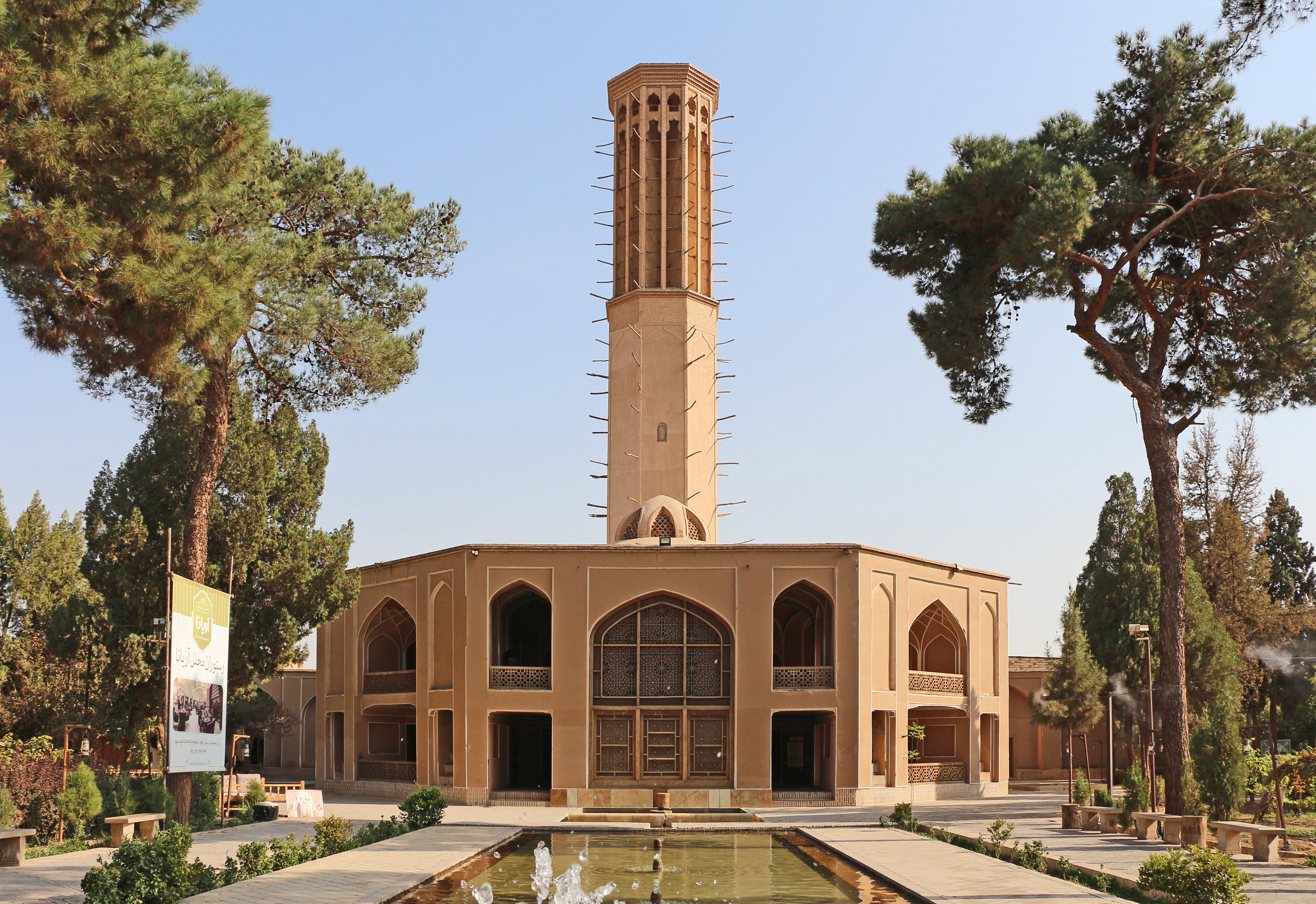
- Interactive map of Dowlatabat Garden
- Location: Yazd, Iran
- Criteria: Cultural: (i), (ii), (iii), (iv), (vi)
- Reference: 1372-007
- Inscription: 2011 (35th Session)

Dowlatabad Garden (Persian: باغ دولت آباد, romanized: Bagh-e Dowlatabad) is a historical garden in Yazd, Iran. Its 33.8 meters tall windcatcher is the tallest adobe-made windcatcher in the world. It was listed as a UNESCO world heritage site in 2011, as part of the Persian gardens. It is also listed in UNESCO as a part of the historical city of Yazd in 2017.

The garden contains several buildings, such as Talar-e Ayeneh (mirror hall building), frontispiece house, Behesht-Aeen building, Badgir building, Haremsara (women quarters), Tehrani building, servants quarters, courthouse, kitchen (cook house), archway, cistern, Shotorkhane, summer and winter stables, and a Qanat.

== History ==
The garden was created in 1747 by Mohammad Taghi Khan Bafqi who was in charge of Yazd after Nader Shah's death. He began the construction by ordering a 65 kilometers long Qanat with 5 root branches to be made to transfer water from Mehriz to the site. Then he constructed his residence and the seat of his government in the garden. The garden fell into ruins after the death of its original owner in 1793. Currently, the garden is irrigated using a semi deep well as the Qanat no longer provides water for the garden.

The garden and the structures in it were repaired by Fath-Ali Shah Qajar's third son Mohammad Vali Mirza who was in 1811 the governor of Yazd, and another time by Soltan Hossein Mirza Jalal ed-Dowleh, the eldest son of Mass'oud Mirza Zell-e Soltan, who was serving as the governor of Yazd. For the last time, it was repaired between 1975 and 1983 which restored the half collapsed windcatcher in some parts. The walls containing the garden once had 6 towers, of which only 1 remains today.

It was listed in the national heritage sites of Iran with the number 774 on 13 March 1968.

== Gallery ==
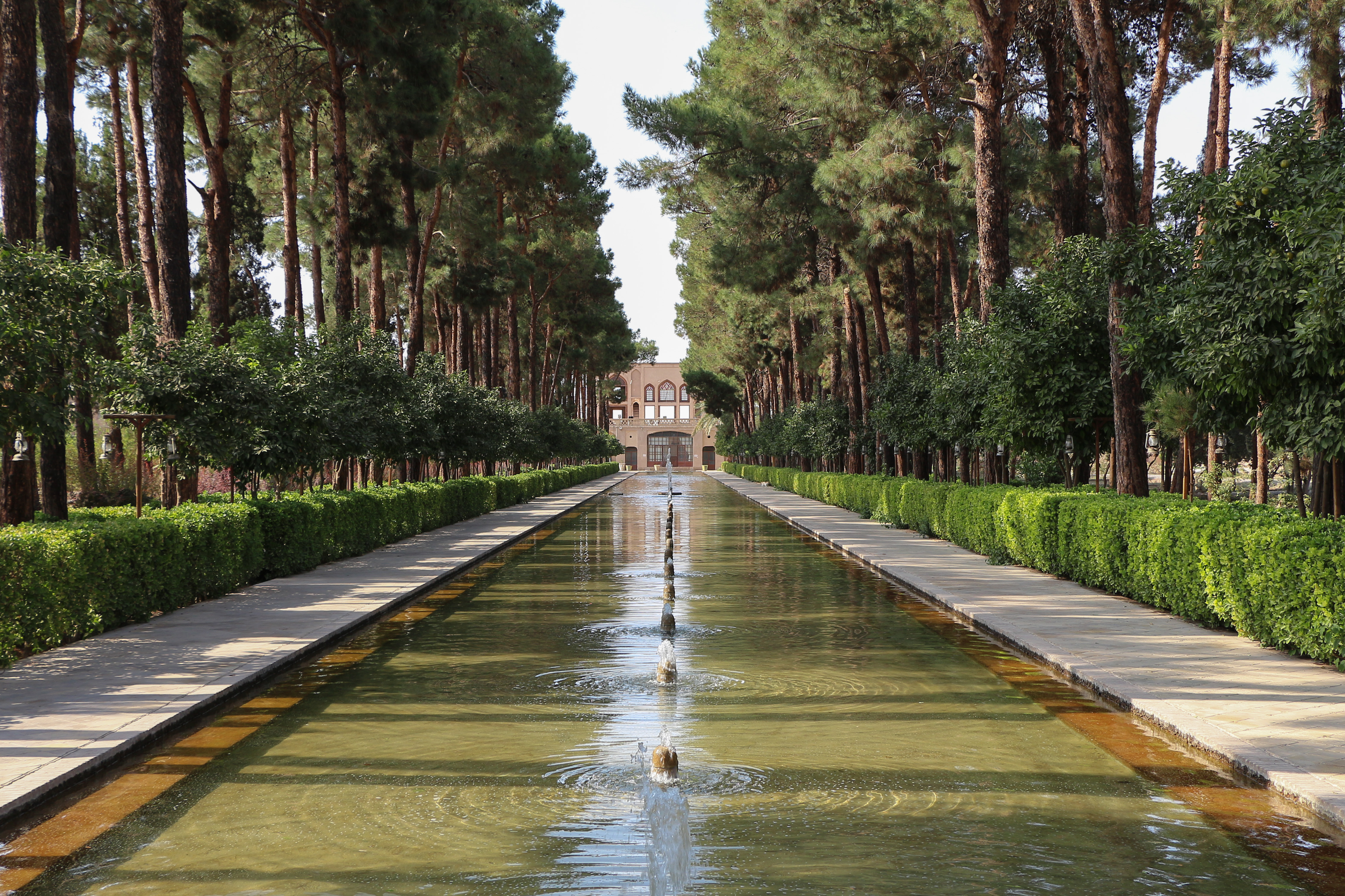

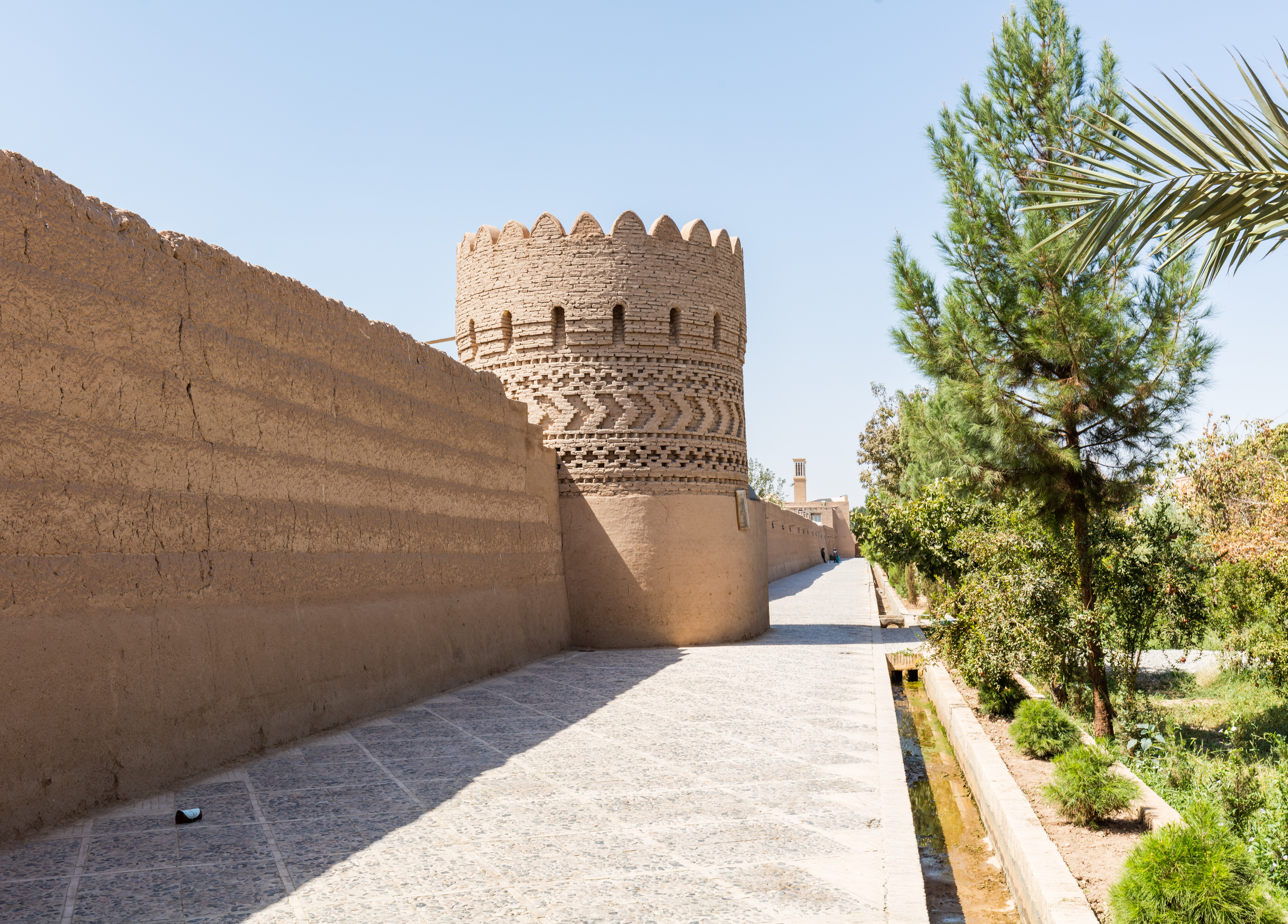

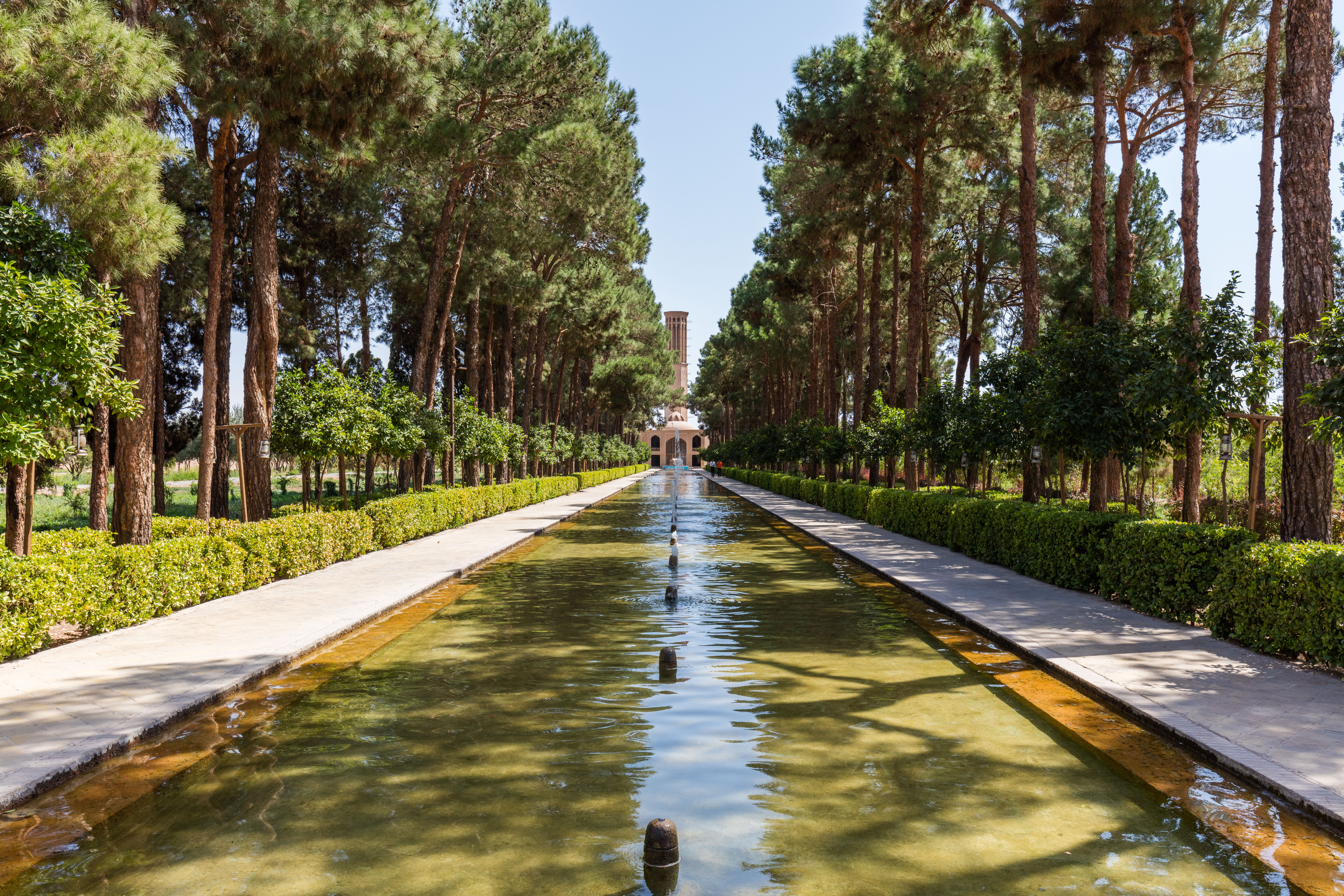

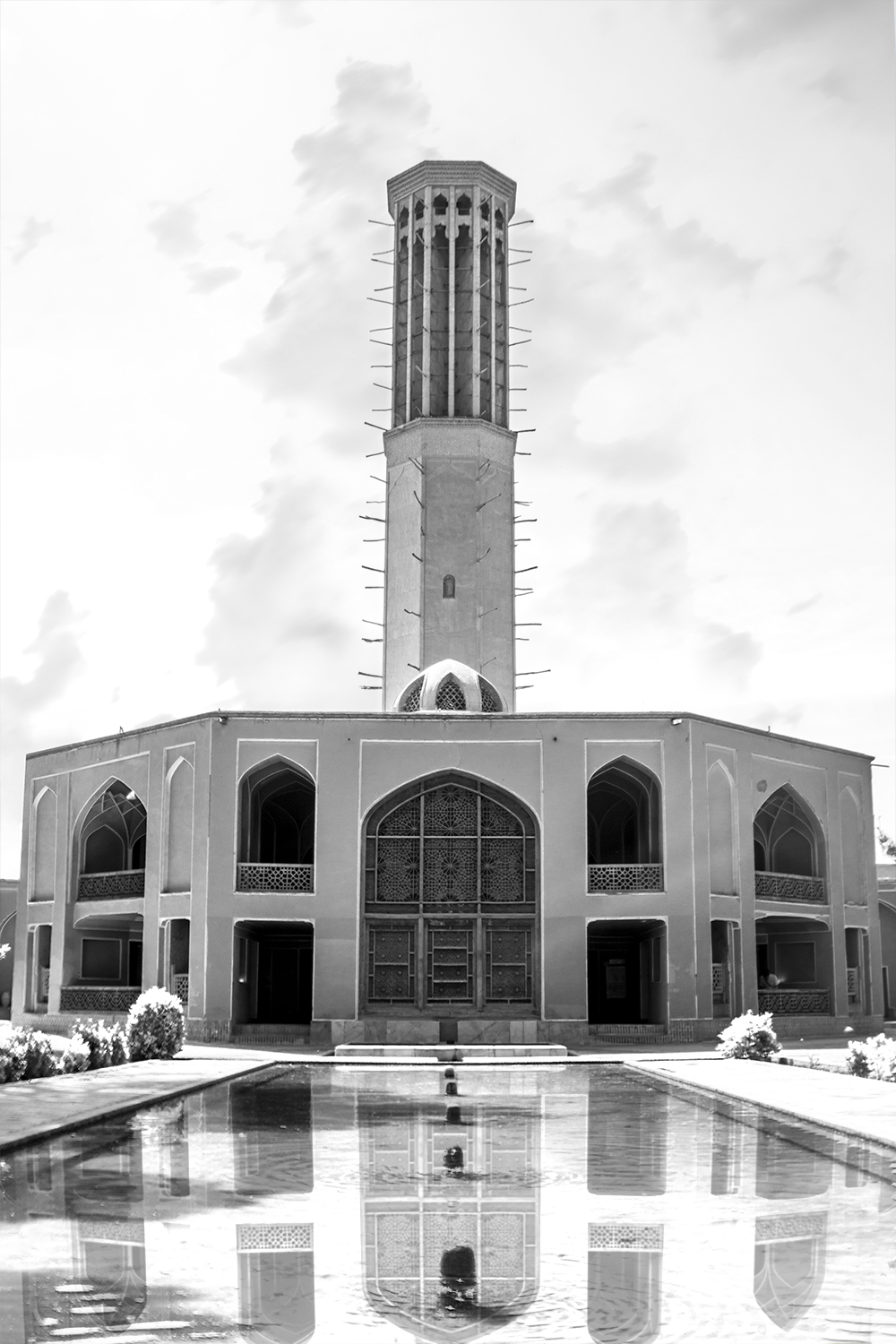

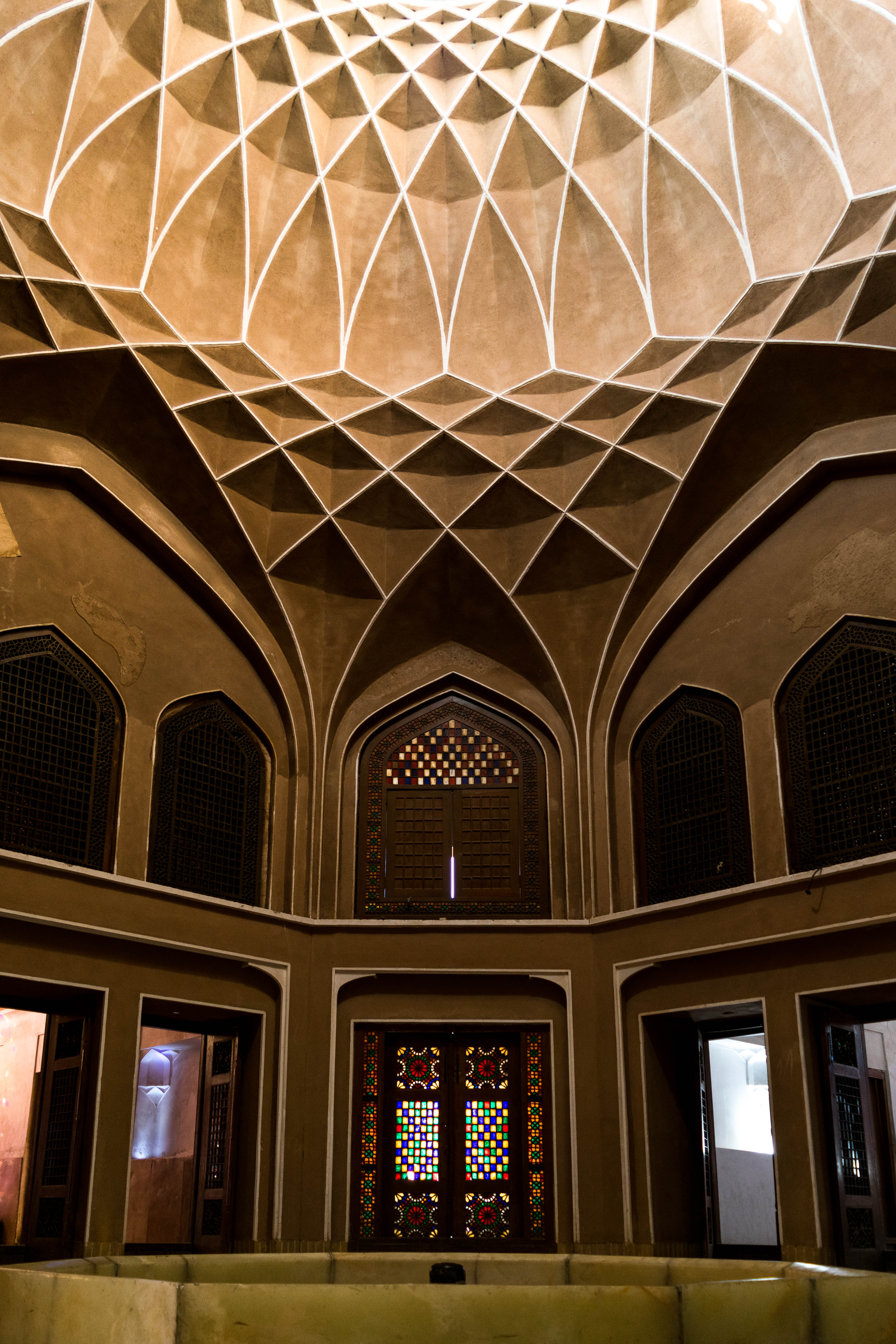

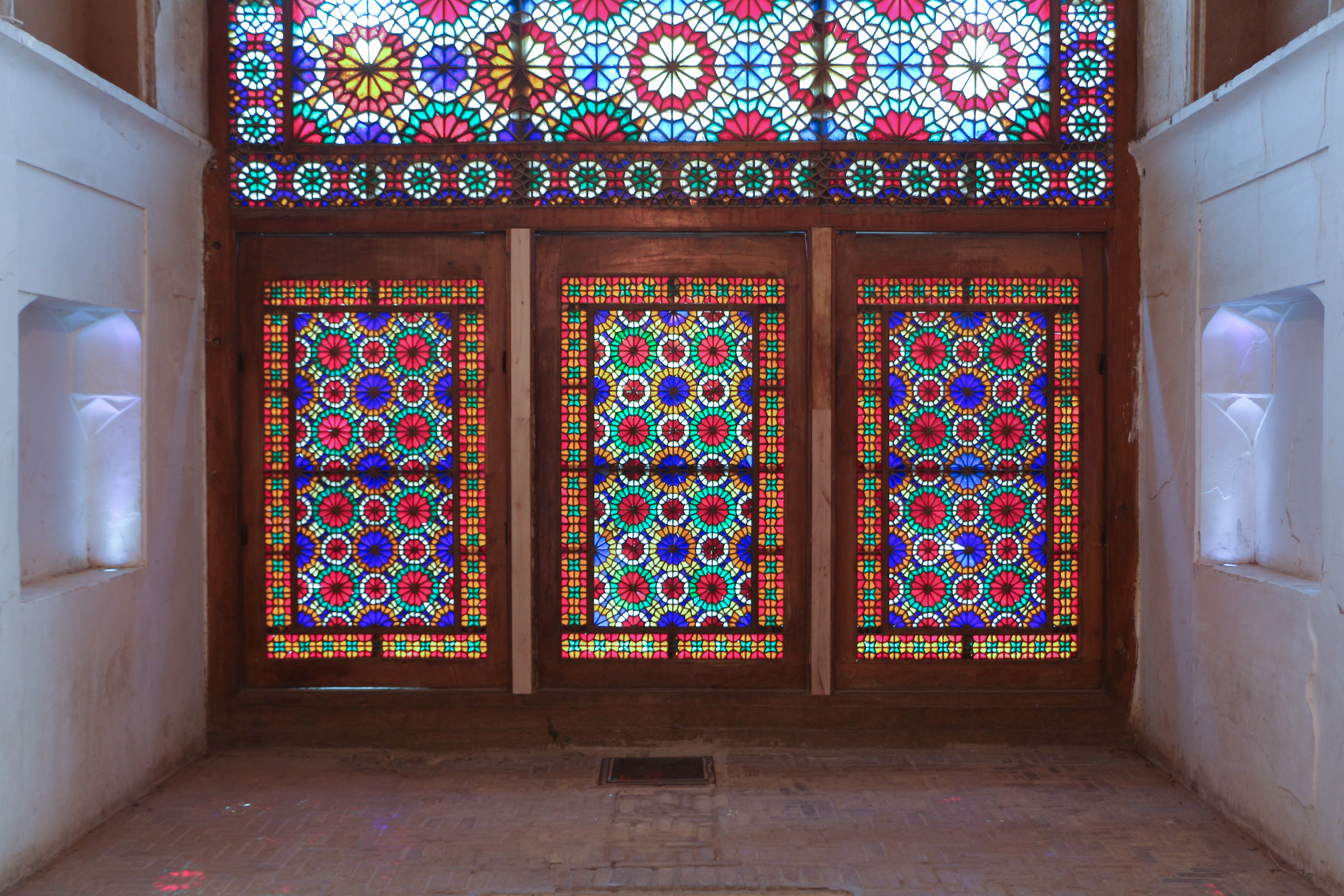

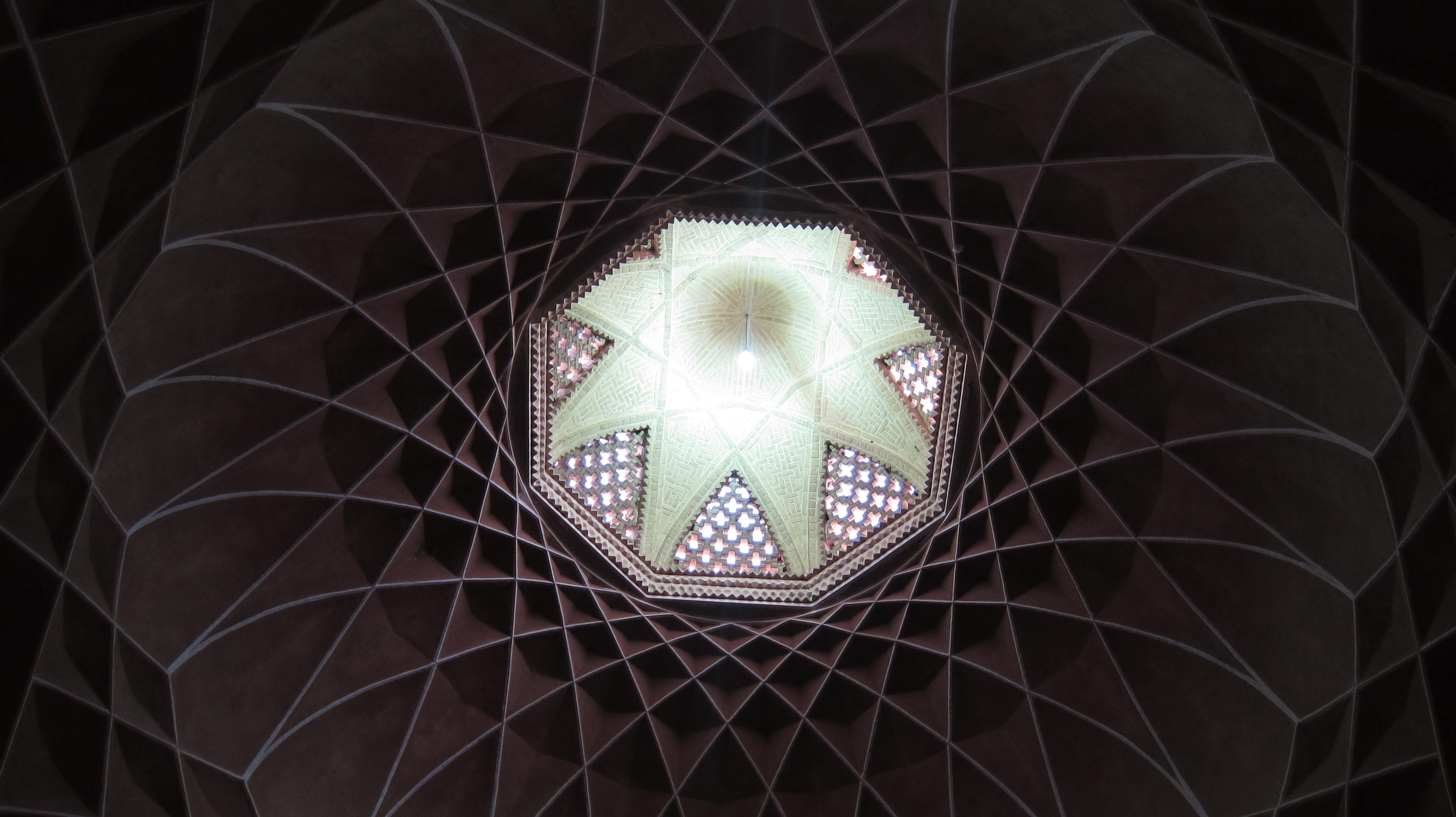

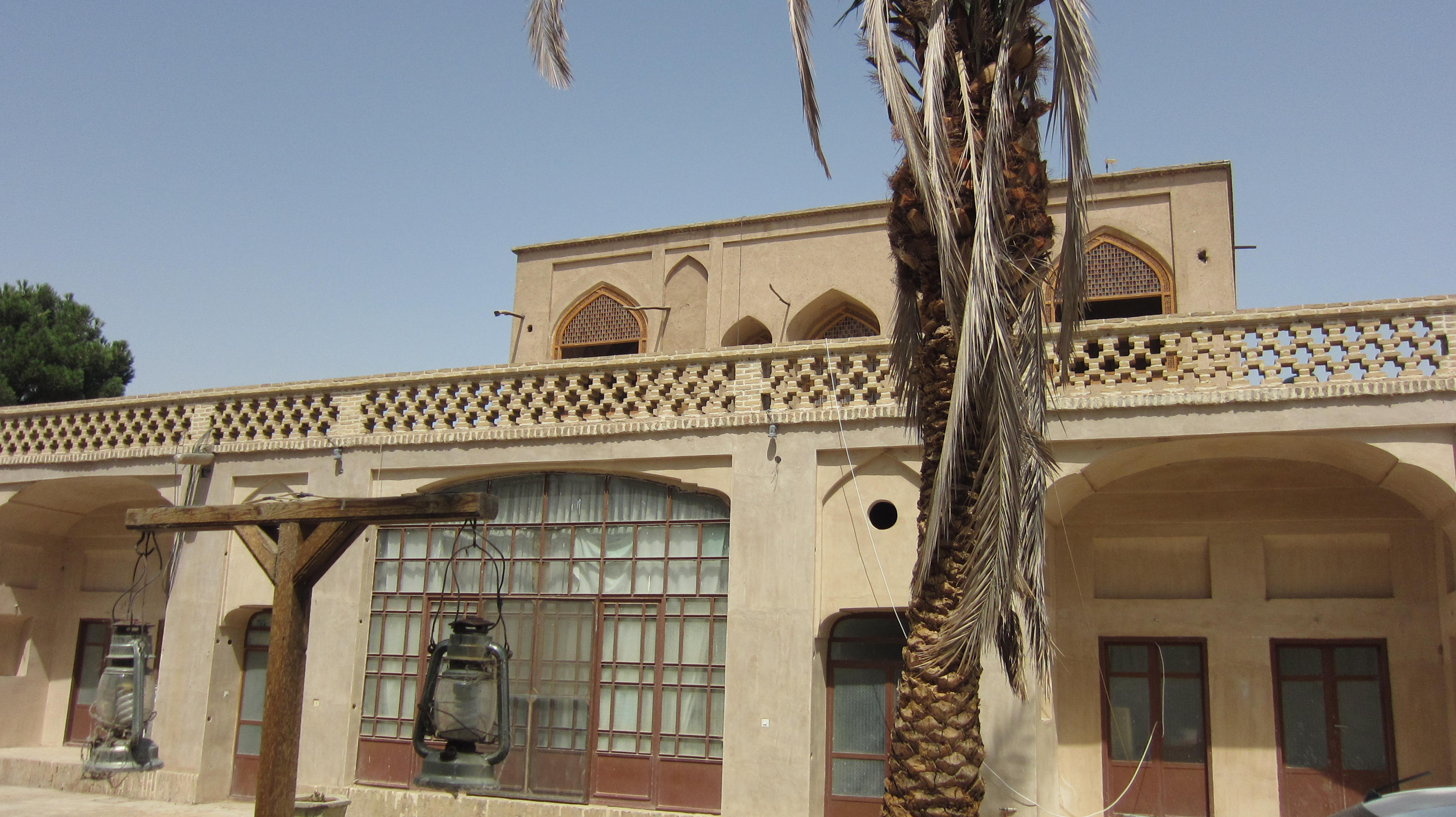
