= Abbas Abad Garden =

Persian garden and UNESCO World Heritage Site in Behshahr, Iran

Bagh-e Abas Abad
UNESCO World Heritage Site
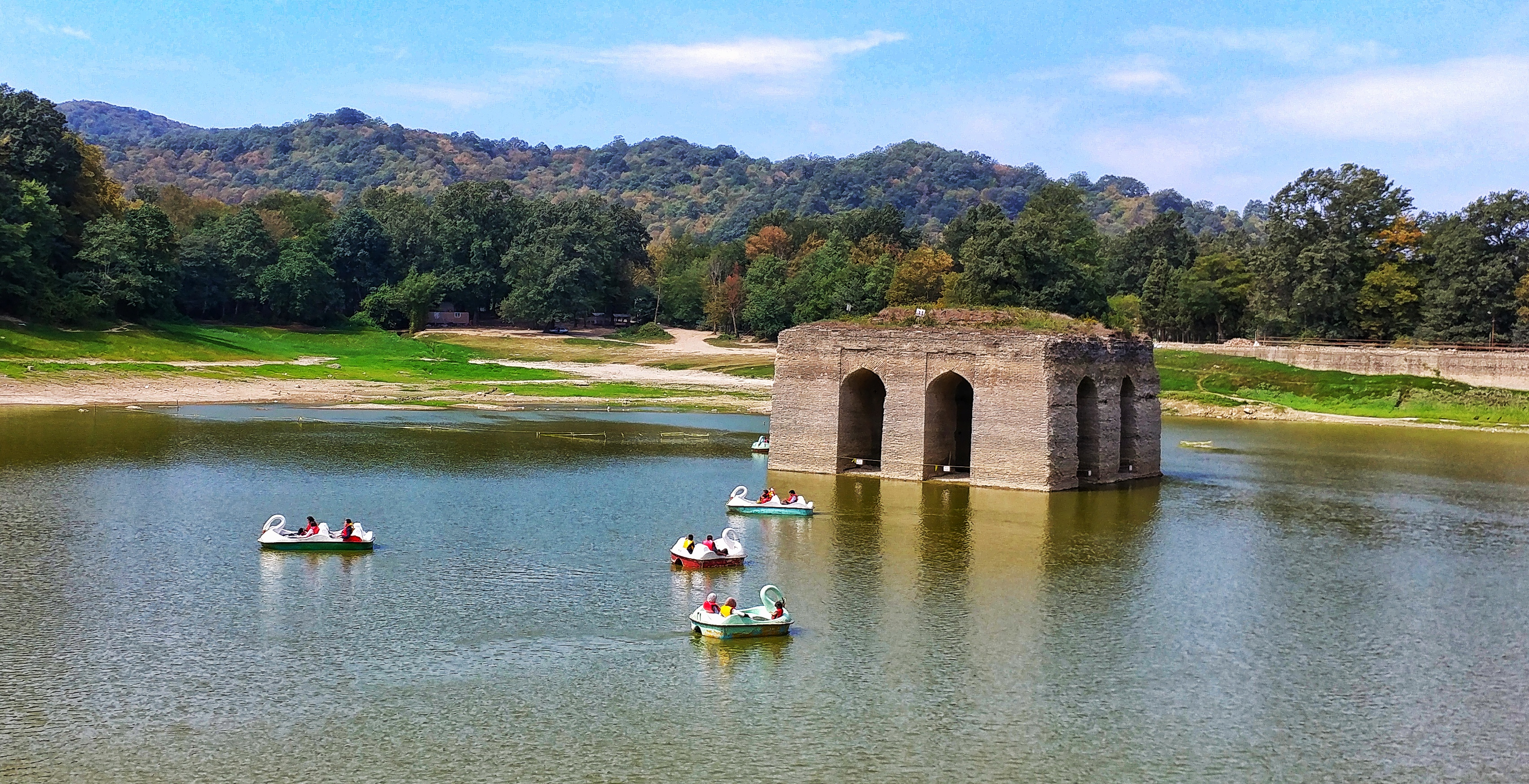

- Location within Iran
- Location: Behshahr, Mazandaran province, Iran
- Part of: The Persian Garden
- Criteria: Cultural: (i)(ii)(iii)(iv)(vi)
- Reference: 1372-005
- Inscription: 2011 (35th Session)
- Area: 420.2 ha (45,230,000 sq ft)
- Buffer zone: 1,169.65 ha (125,900,000 sq ft)
- Coordinates: 36°39′55″N 53°35′44″E

Abbas Abad Garden (Persian: باغ عباس اباد, romanized: Bāgh-e Abbāsābād), also known as Abbas Abad Historical Complex and referred to by UNESCO as Bagh-e Abas Abad, is a Persian garden and historical complex near Behshahr, in Mazandaran province, northern Iran. The complex is located approximately 9 kilometres (5.6 mi) southeast of Behshahr, near the village of Al Tappeh, on the southern slopes of the Alborz mountain range. It consists of a formal garden, an artificial lake, the Abbas Abad Dam, the Chahar Bagh complex, a palace, a bathhouse, a water mill, two brick towers, stone-paved paths, and an extensive water-management system.

The garden was constructed around 1613 during the reign of Shah Abbas I, as part of the Safavid royal landscape around Behshahr, then known as Ashraf. In 2011, Abbas Abad Garden was inscribed as one of nine gardens comprising the World Heritage Site no. 1372, The Persian Garden.

== Garden ==
The garden is laid out on the slope of the Alborz mountains, with its architecture adapted to the natural gradient of the terrain. Its central platform contains a basin into which water from the Chahar Bagh enters as a fountain. From this central basin, water flows through ceramic pipes to basins on all sides of the platform. These basins supplied water to the garden's flower beds and other parts of the complex.

The garden's layout includes paved passages and irrigated garden beds arranged around the central platform. Archaeological investigations have uncovered parts of the eastern, northern and southern roads, as well as Safavid-period stone paving and other garden structures.

== Chahar Bagh ==
The Chahar Bagh complex is located 600 metres (2,000 ft) southeast of the main garden, on the southeastern slope of the mountain overlooking the lake. It covers approximately 3,200 square metres (34,000 sq ft). During the Safavid period, the mountain slope was cut and levelled to create a flat area measuring 46 by 72 metres (151 ft × 236 ft). Because the Chahar Bagh is 15 metres (49 ft) higher than the main garden, it served as a point for distributing water to the main garden.

Water from the Sarcheshmeh spring was brought to the Chahar Bagh through an open canal or interconnected ceramic pipes called tanbusheh. From there, the water was distributed throughout the garden complex for a variety of uses.

== Lake and waterworks ==
The artificial lake and reservoir form the central feature of the complex. The lake covers approximately 98,000 square metres (1,050,000 sq ft) and reaches a maximum depth of about 10 metres (33 ft). The Abbas Abad Dam was constructed across a deep valley and controlled the discharge of water from the lake for agricultural irrigation, including the cultivation of rice in areas north of the complex. Its structure included projecting arms on either side of the foundation and a rear supporting structure that also regulated water release.

A brick structure stands within the lake and is almost completely submerged when the water rises. The complex also contains a system of channels, watercourses and ceramic pipes used to distribute water throughout the garden. Two brick towers functioned as hydraulic safety structures, acting as safety valves, siphon traps and pressure-relief structures within the water system.

UNESCO's nomination describes Abbas Abad as an important example of the integration of landscape design and water engineering in the humid climate of northern Iran.

== History ==
Following the decline of the Safavid dynasty, the garden fell out of use. The gardens became obscured by the surrounding forest, while the lake and remains of the structures survived.

In 1967, Abbas Abad Garden was registered on the Iran National Heritage List as national heritage monument No. 745.

Archaeological research at the complex began in 1977, with investigations initially focusing on the structure in the centre of the reservoir. Subsequent archaeological work examined the bathhouse, water-management system, palace and garden areas, water mill, industrial areas, Safavid-period stone paving and other archaeological remains.

The garden is component 1372-005 of the serial World Heritage Site The Persian Garden, which comprises nine historic Persian gardens in Iran.

== Gallery ==
Ruins at the Abbas Abad complex

Overview of the terrain

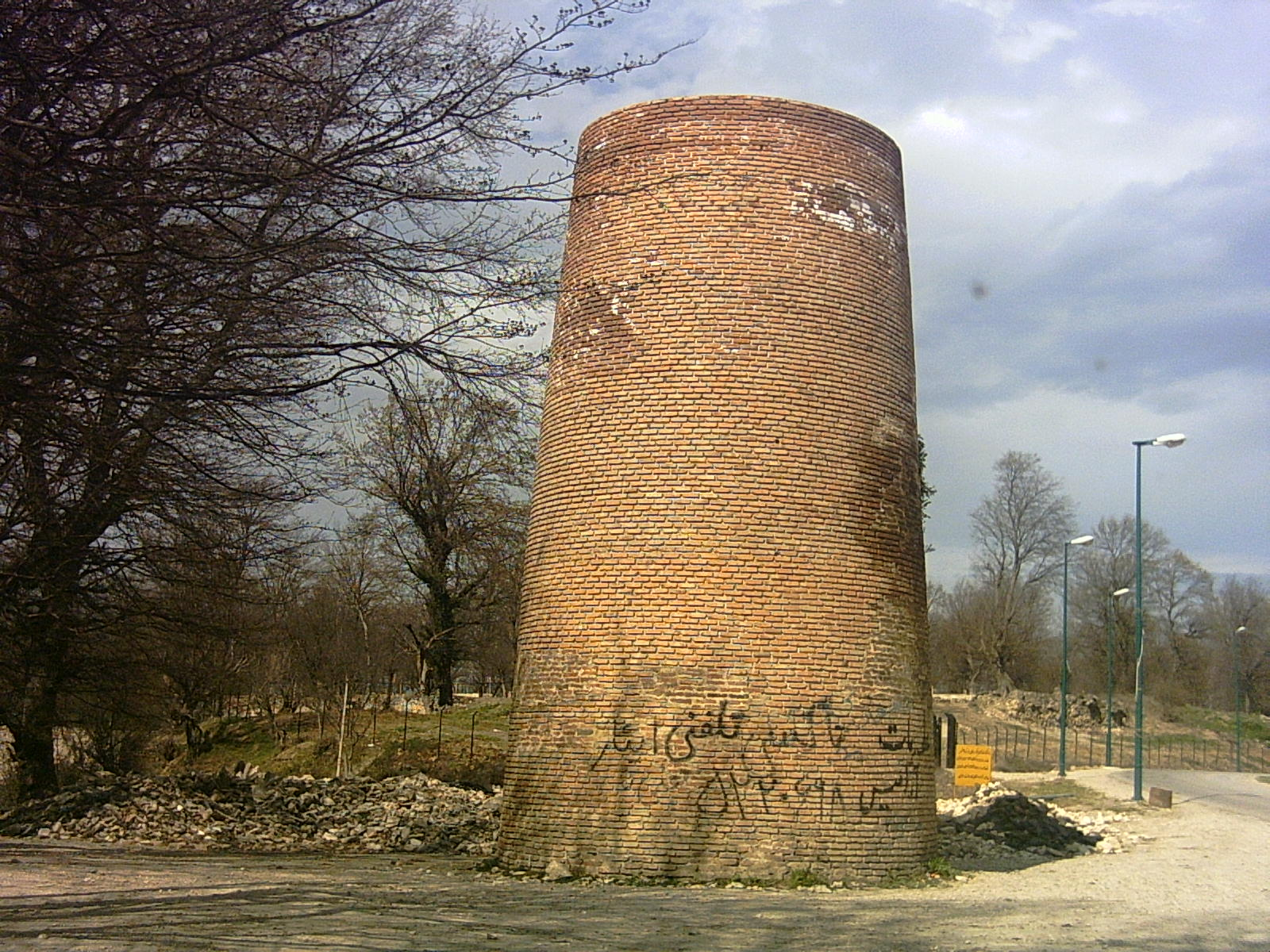
A tower at the Abbas Abad complex

High water at the Abbas Abad complex

The dry lakebed during summer

== See also ==
- Persian gardens
