= Shazdeh Garden =

UNESCO World Heritage Site in Mahan, Iran

Bagh-e Shahzadeh
UNESCO World Heritage Site
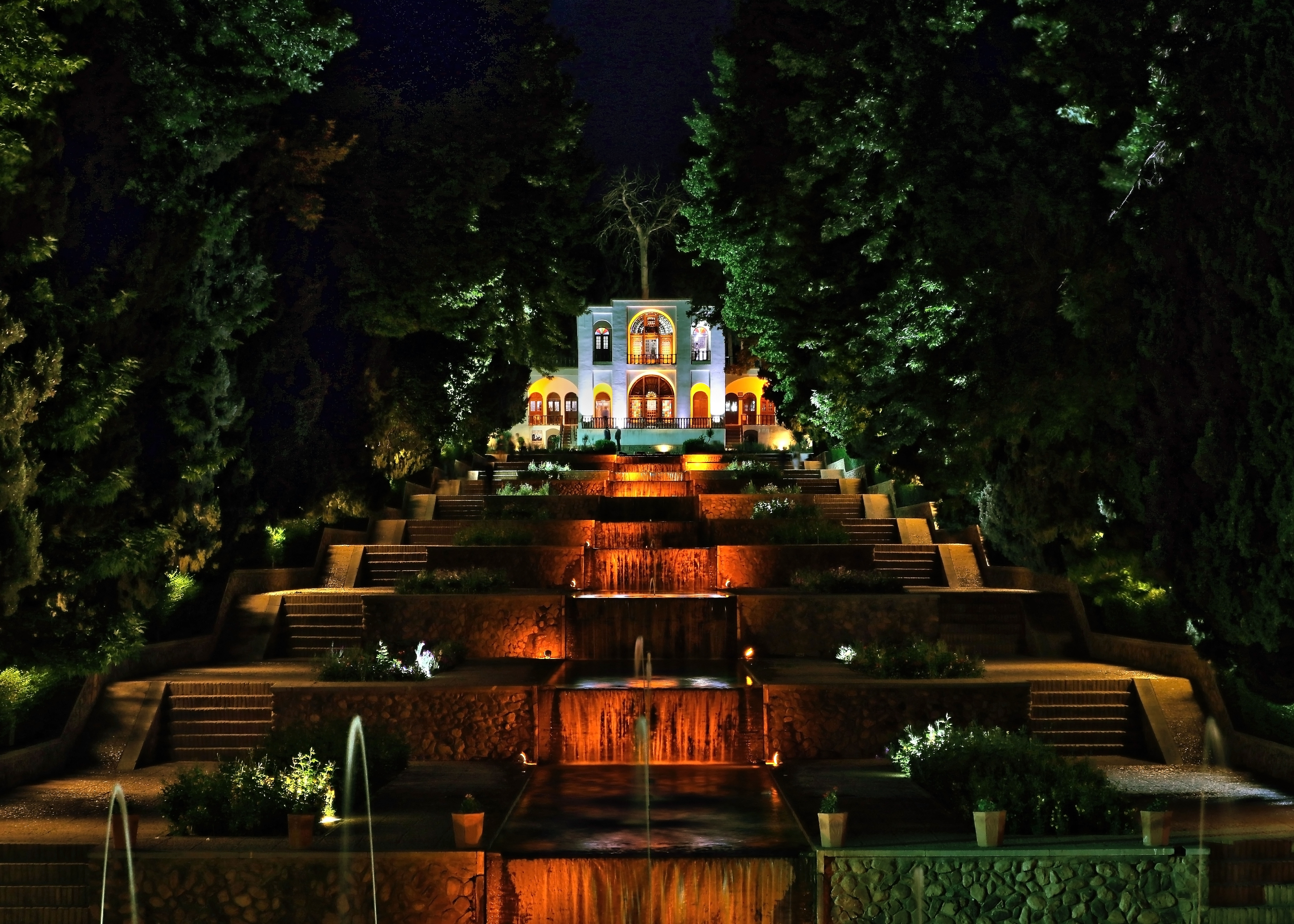

- Location within Iran
- Location: Kerman, Kerman Province, Iran
- Part of: The Persian Garden
- Criteria: Cultural: (i)(ii)(iii)(iv)(vi)
- Reference: 1372-006
- Inscription: 2011 (35th Session)
- Area: 5.5 ha (0.021 sq mi)
- Buffer zone: 6,181.5 ha (23.867 sq mi)
- Coordinates: 30°1′25.98″N 57°16′55.53″E

Shazdeh Mahan Garden (Persian: باغ شازده ماهان, romanized: Bāgh-e Shāzdeh Mahan, lit. 'Prince Mahan Garden') is a Qajar-era Persian garden located near (6 km away from) Mahan in Kerman province, Iran.

The garden is 5.5 hectares with a rectangular shape and a wall around it.

Spread over 5.5 hectares, Shazdeh Garden is rectangular in shape. It has an entrance and a gate at the lower end and a two-floor residential structure at the upper end. The distance between these two is lined by water fountains. In June 2011, Shazdeh Garden was recognised as a UNESCO World Heritage Site along with other Persian gardens.

The Mansion of Shazdeh Mahan Garden
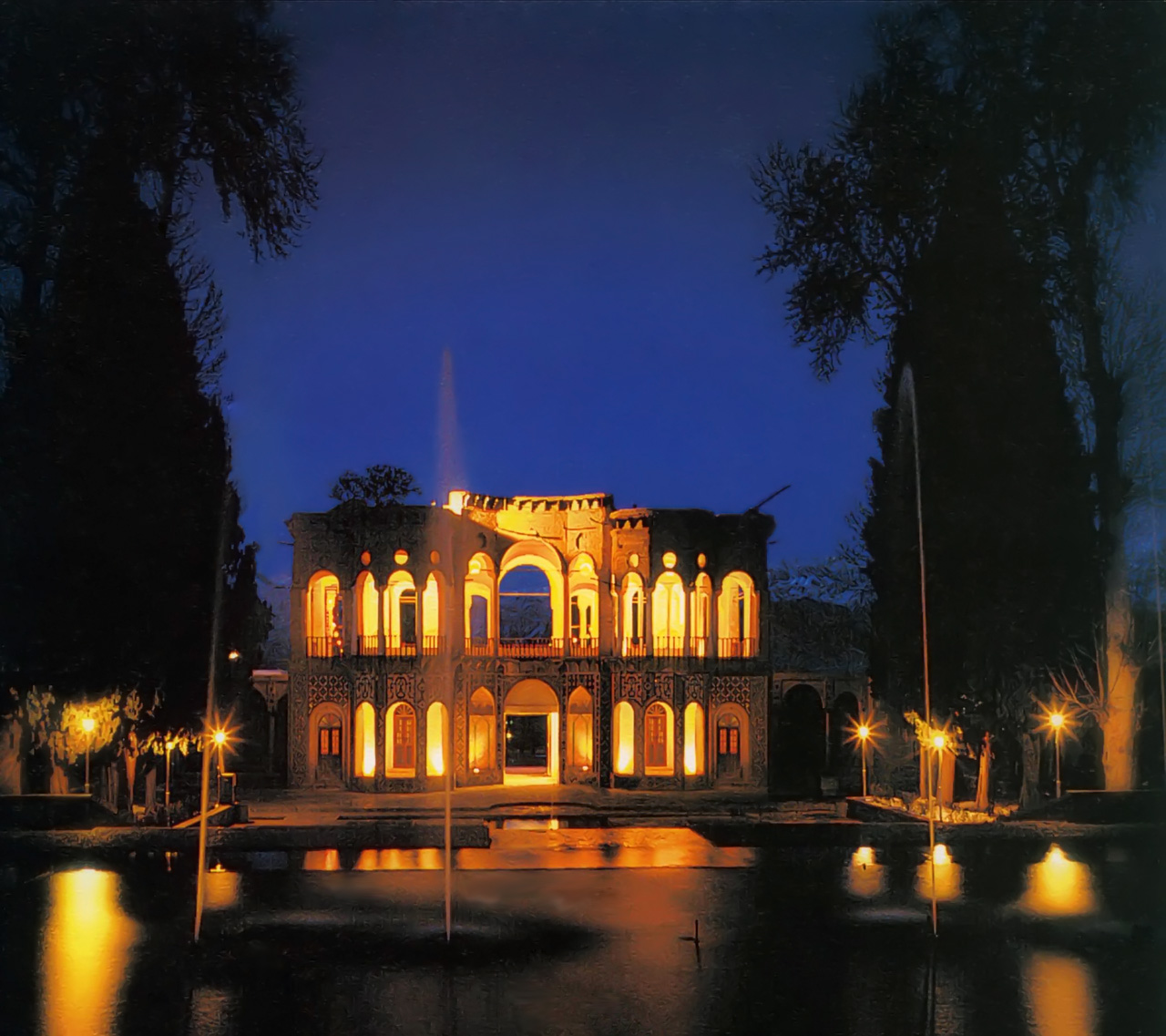

== Gallery ==
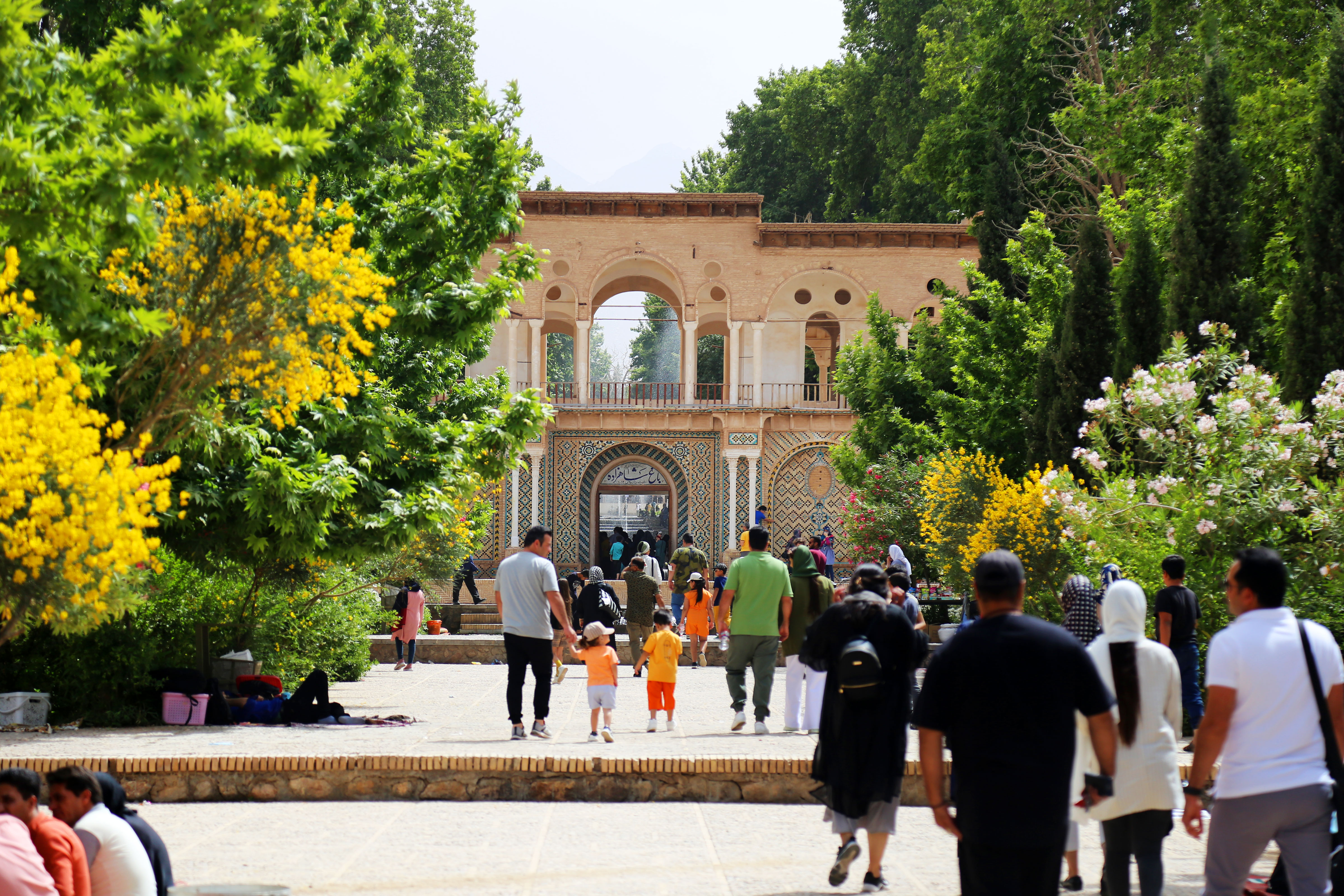
Shazdeh Garden, Mahan, Kerman, Iran

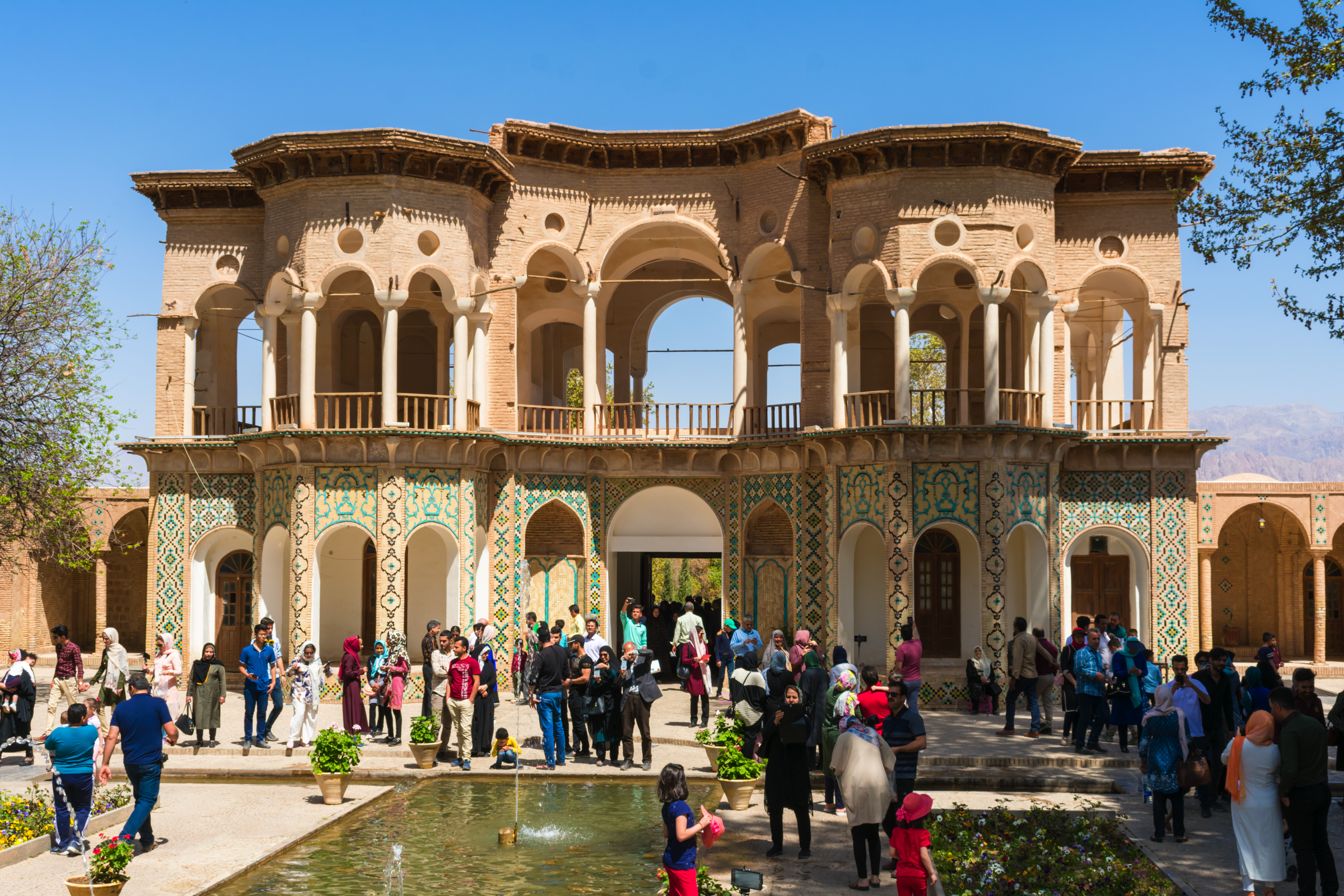
Shazdeh Garden, Mahan, Kerman

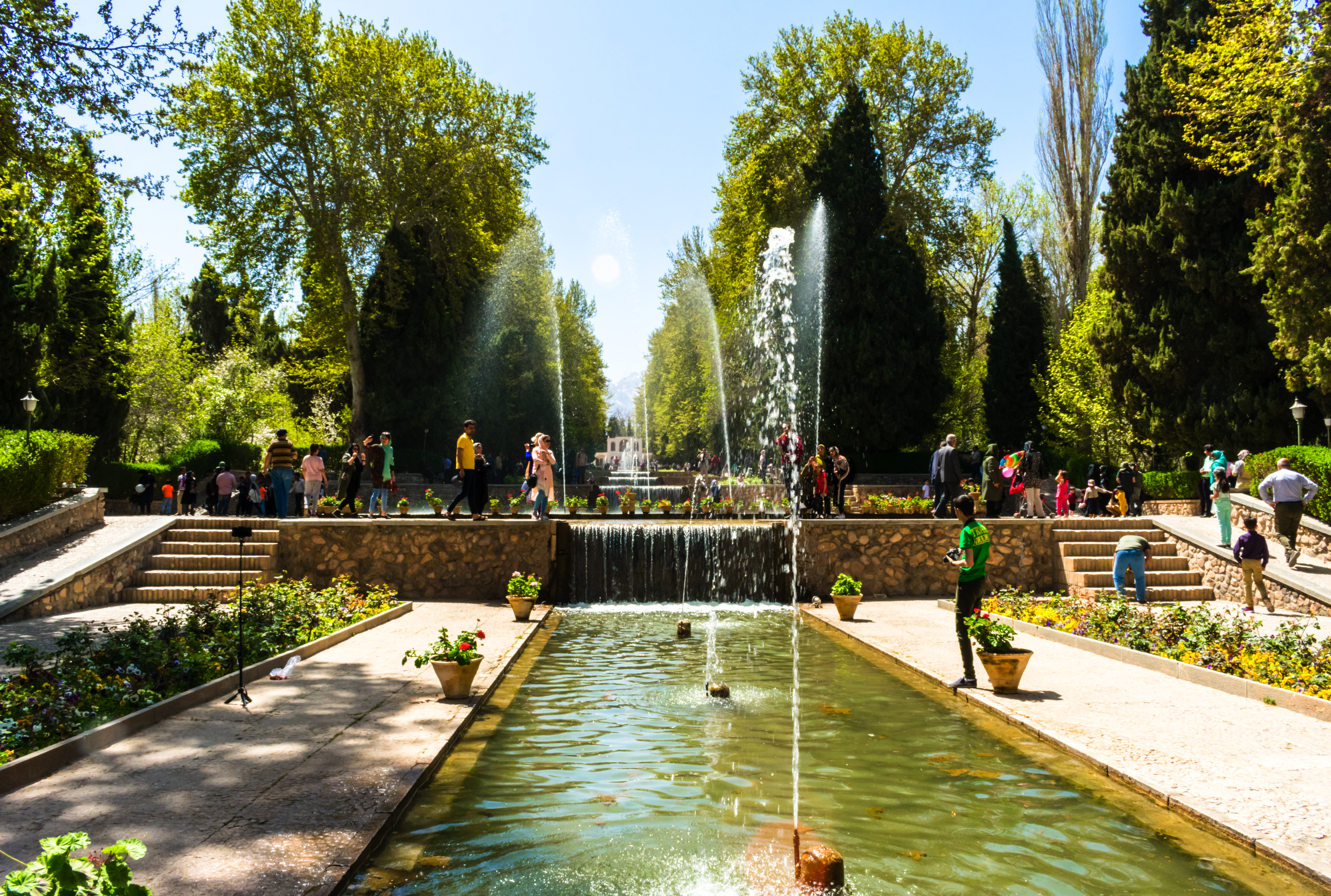
Shazdeh Garden, Mahan, Kerman

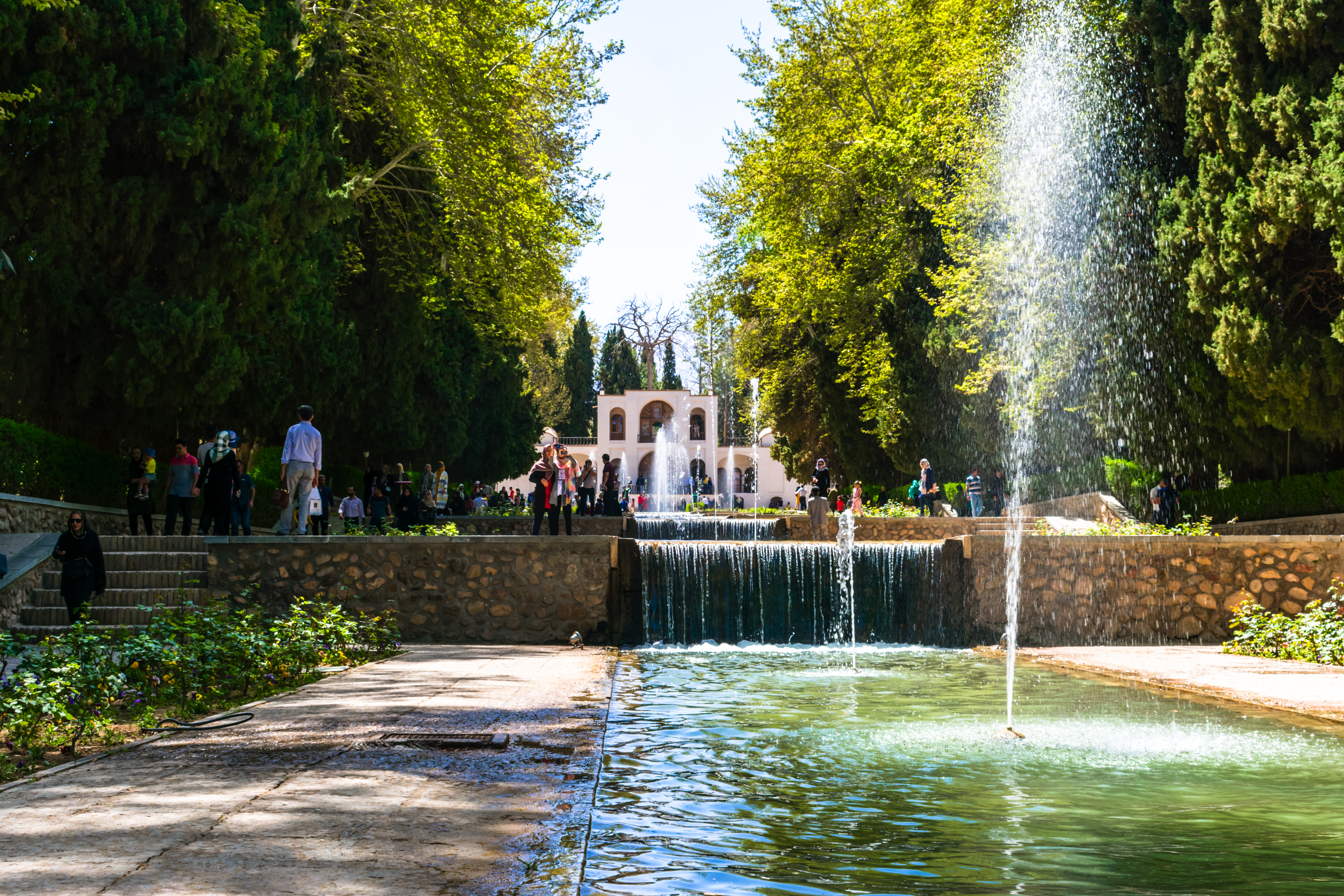
Shazdeh Garden, Mahan, Kerman

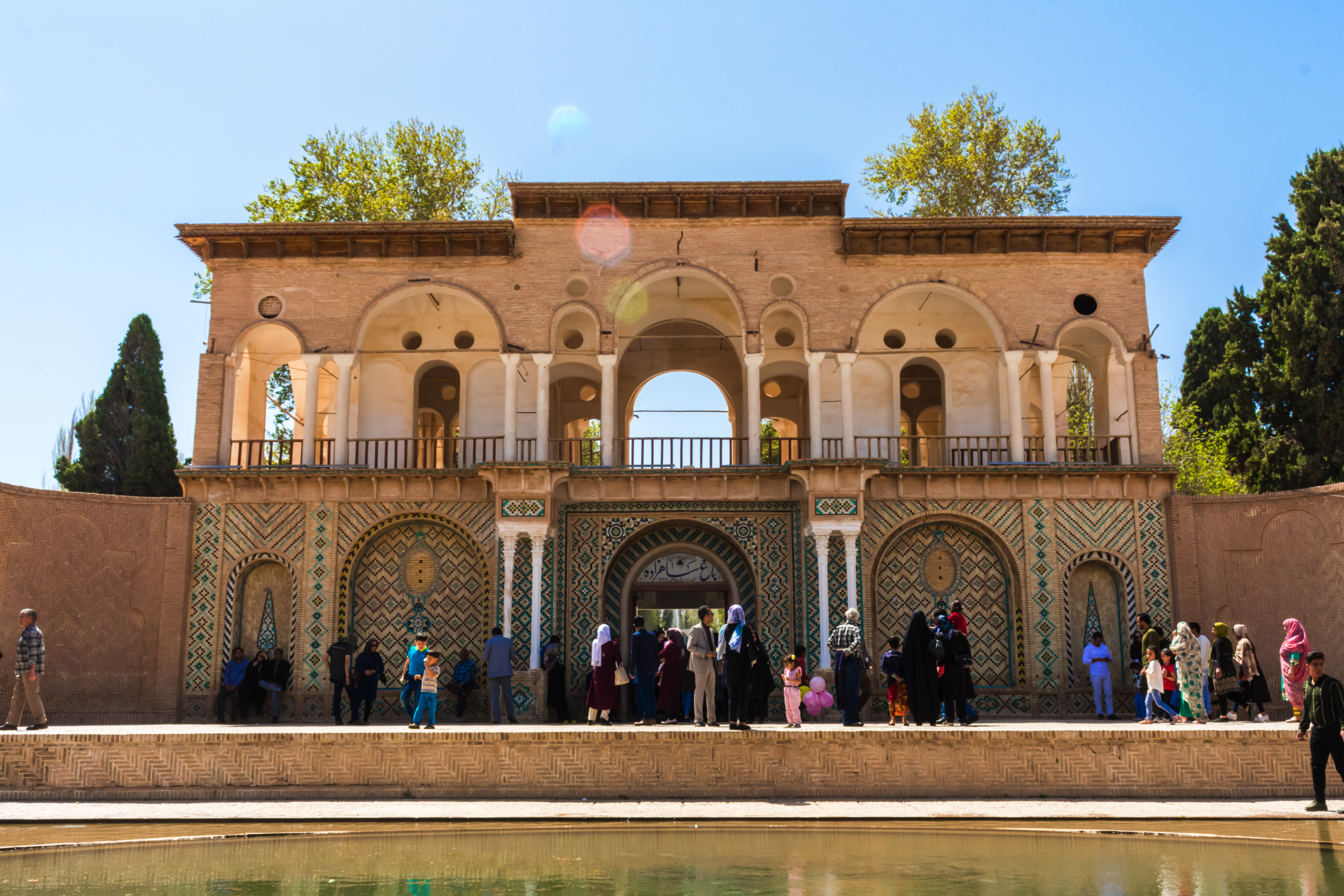
Shazdeh Garden, Mahan, Kerman

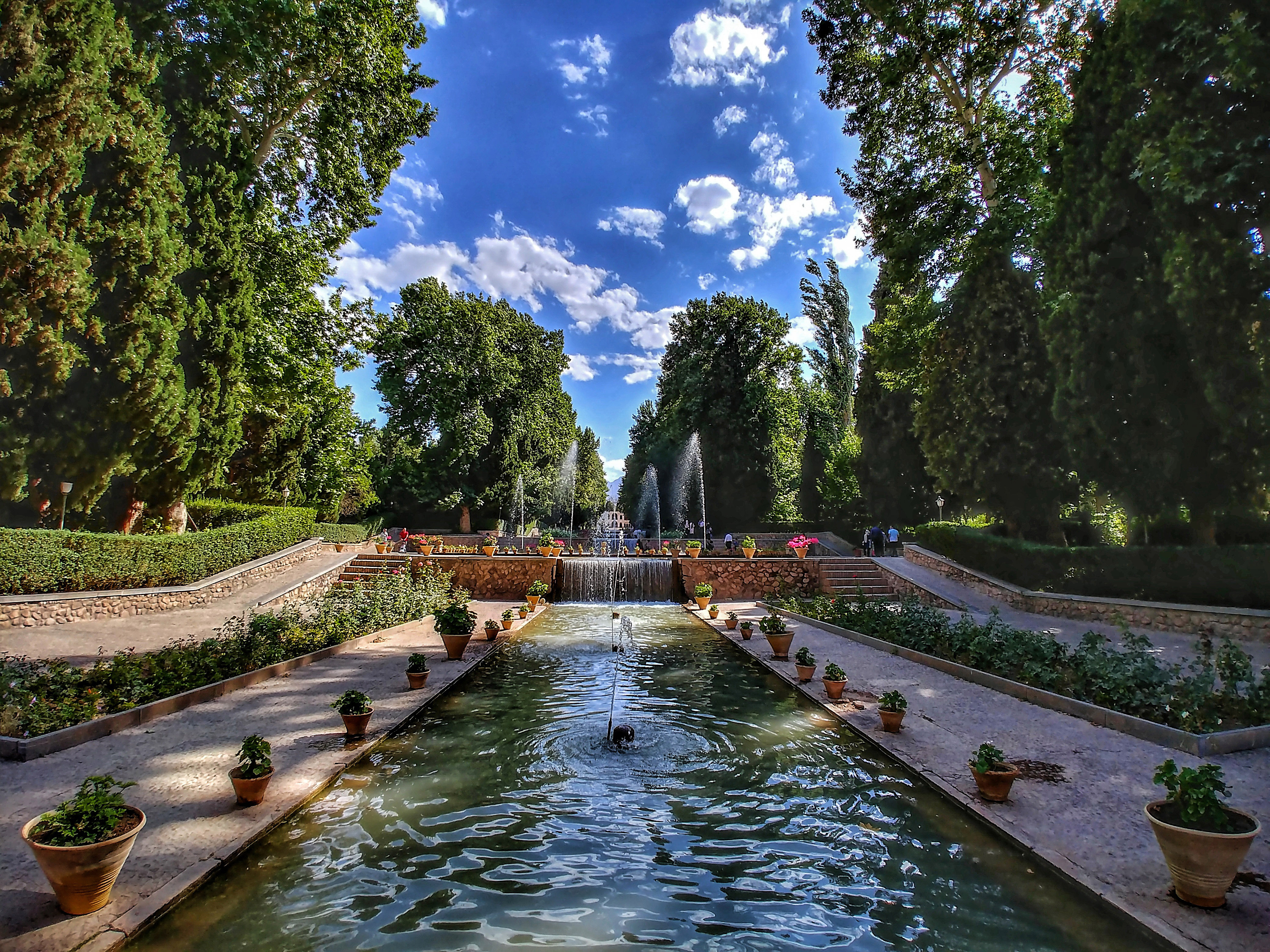
Shazdeh Garden, Mahan, Kerman

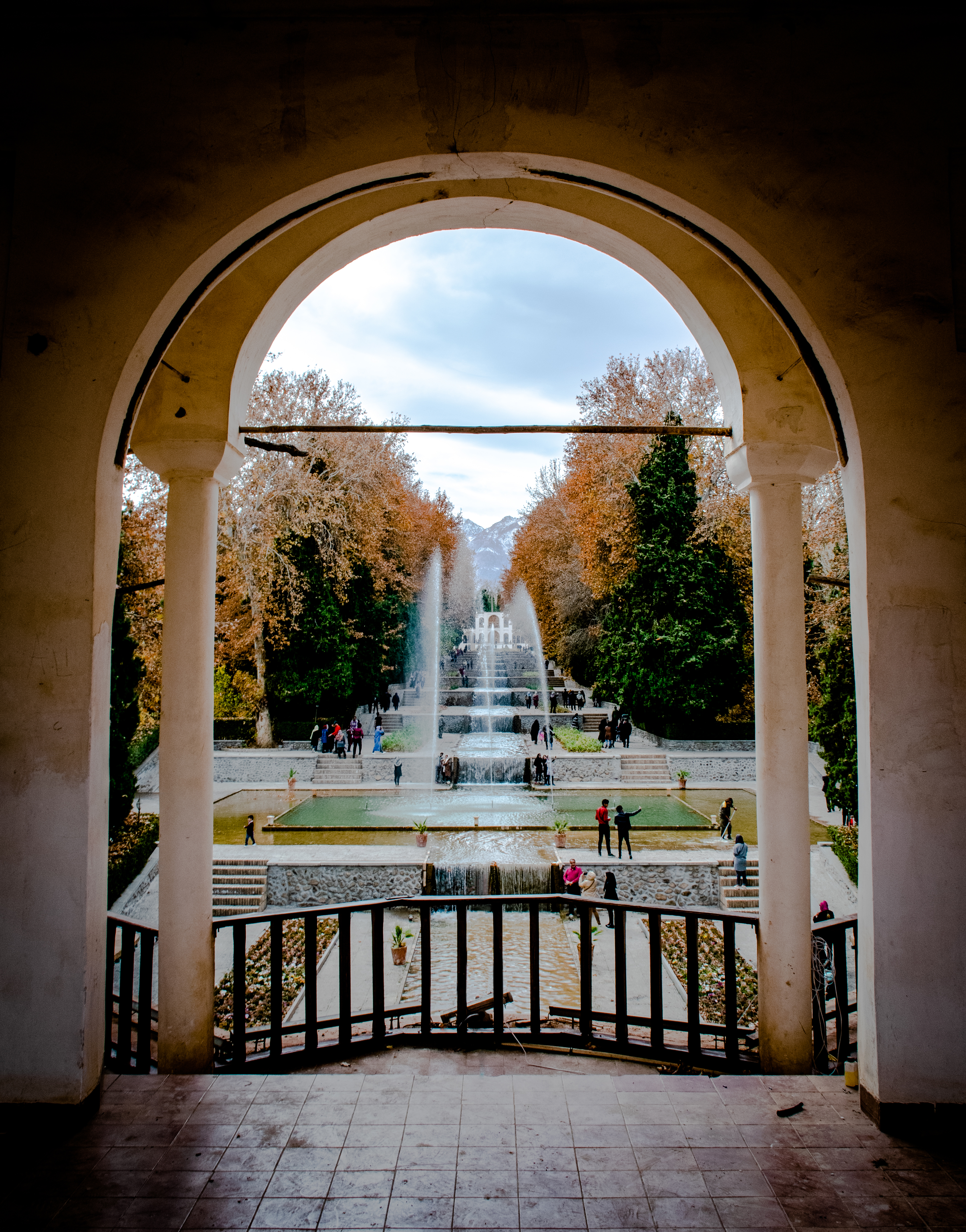
Shazdeh Garden, Mahan, Kerman (msehome)

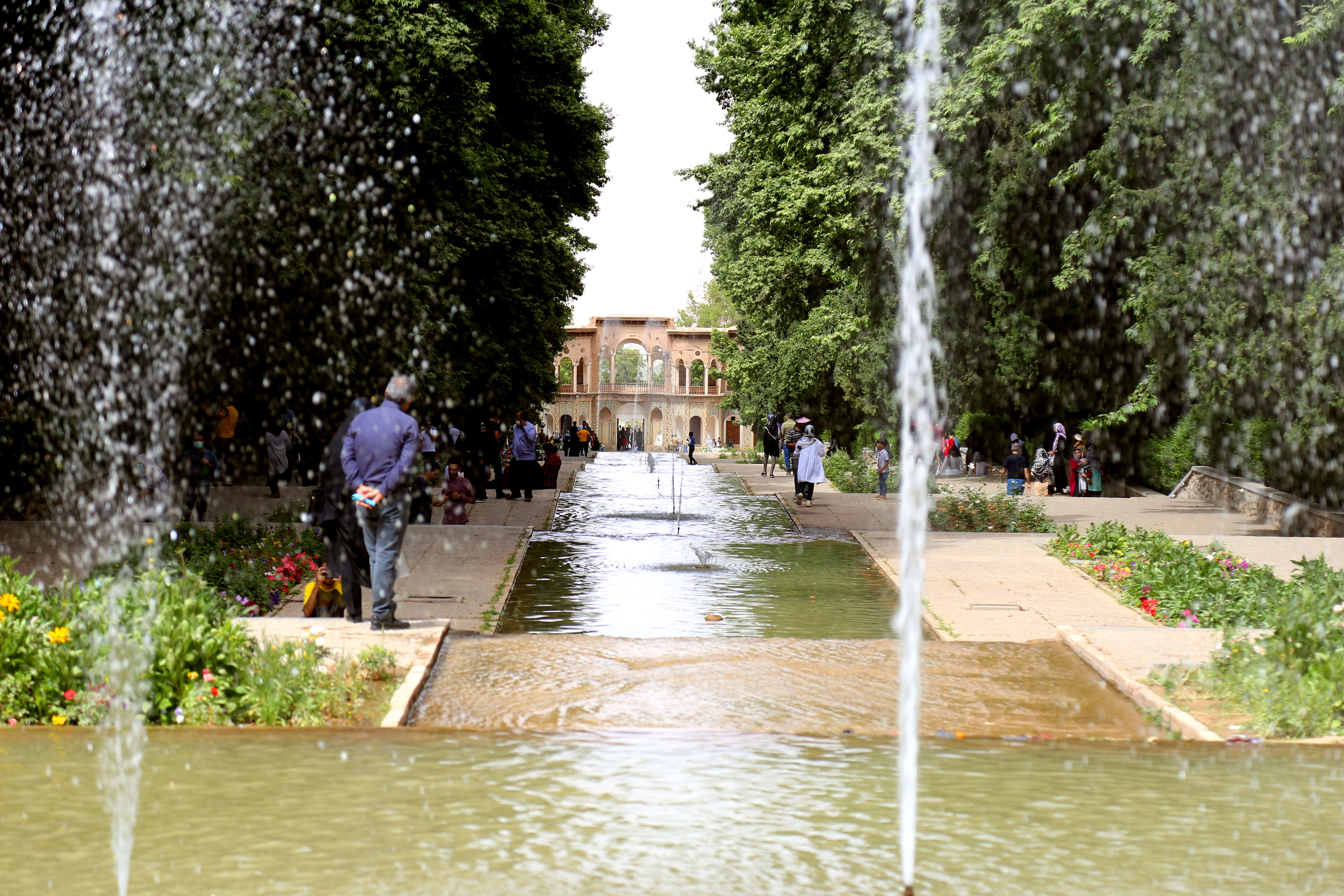
Shazdeh Garden, Mahan, Kerman, Iran

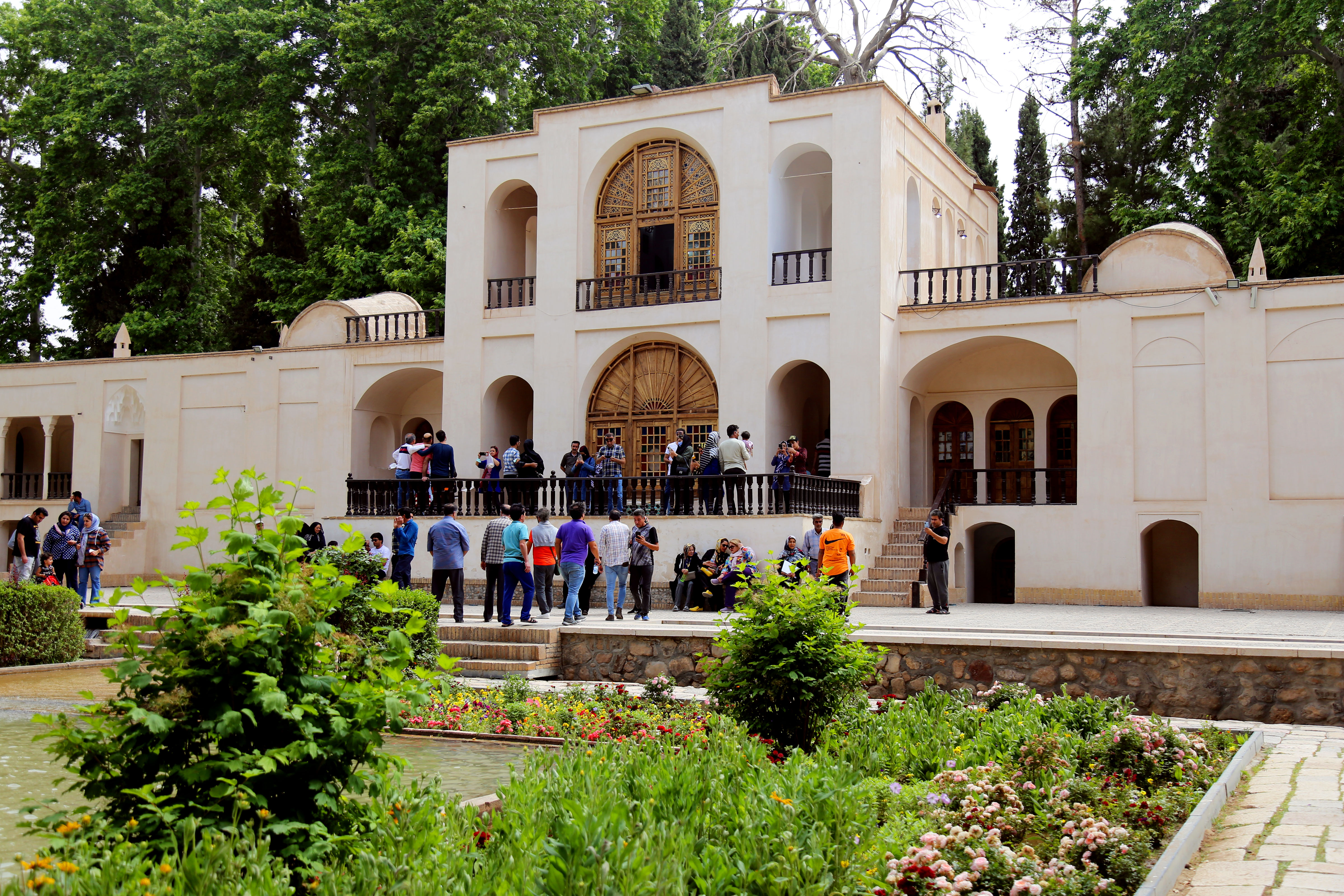
Shazdeh Garden, Mahan, Kerman, Iran

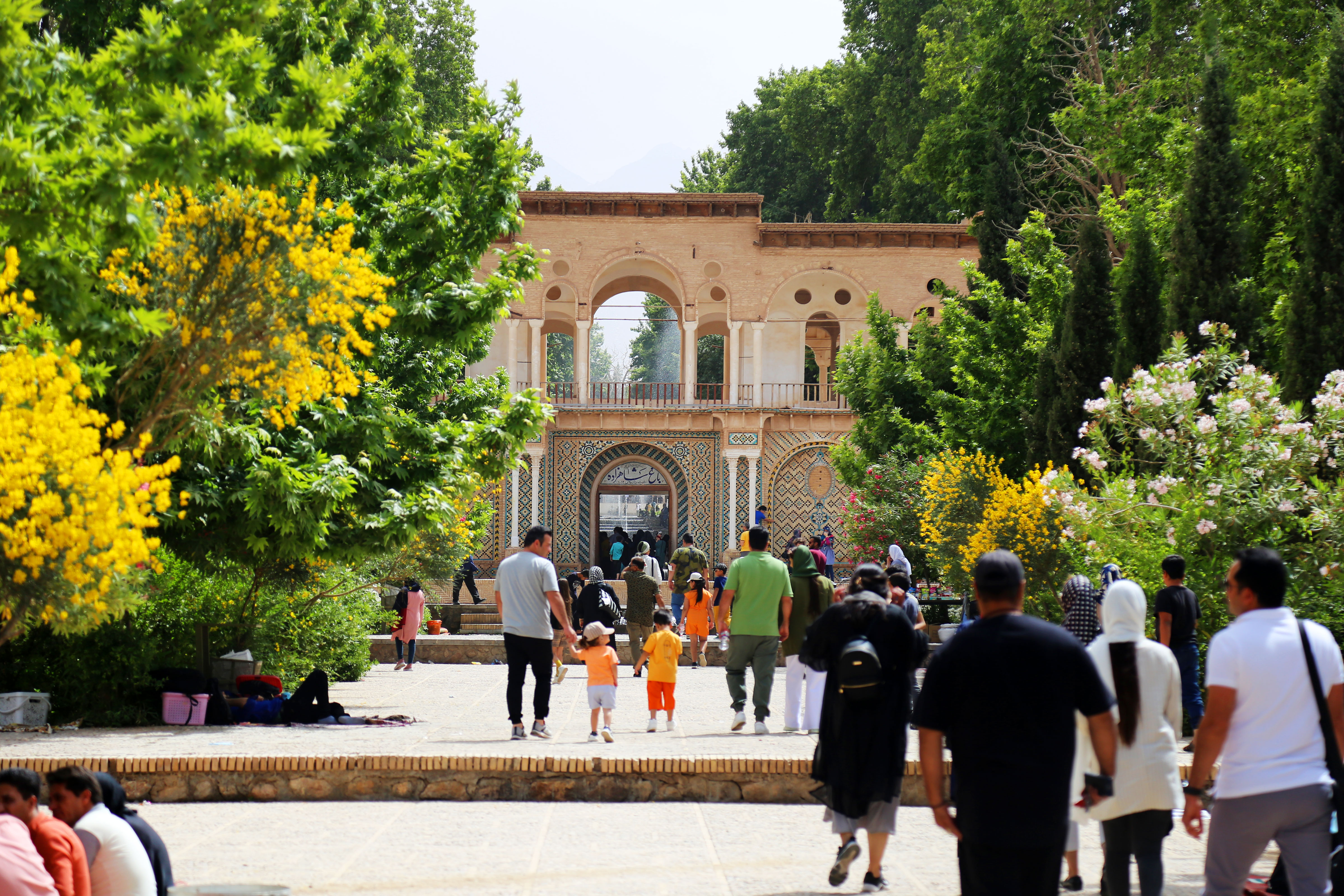
Shazdeh Garden, Mahan, Kerman, Iran
