= Akbarieh Garden =

UNESCO World Heritage Site in Iran

Bagh-e Akbarieh
UNESCO World Heritage Site
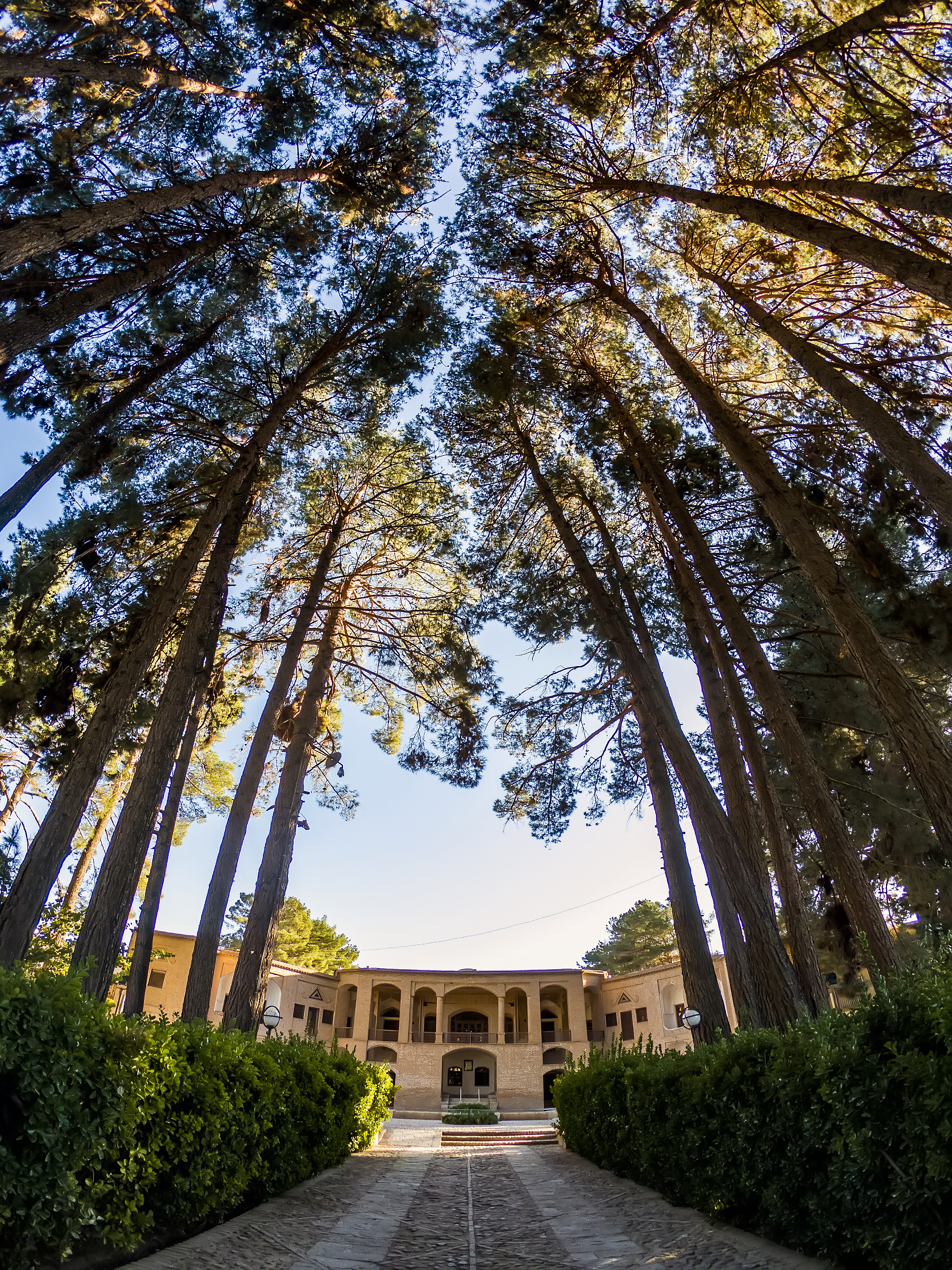

- Location within Iran
- Location: Birjand, South Khorasan Province, Iran
- Part of: The Persian Garden
- Criteria: Cultural: (i)(ii)(iii)(iv)(vi)
- Reference: 1372-009
- Inscription: 2011 (35th Session)
- Coordinates: 32°51′11″N 59°13′41″E

Akbarieh Garden (Persian: باغ اکبریه) is a UNESCO World Heritage Site in Birjand, South Khorasan province, Iran (WHS 1372–009). It was inscribed on the UNESCO World Heritage List in 2011. It annually receives thousands of domestic and foreign tourists. It is concomitantly used as a museum and tourist space.

== History ==
The Akbarieh Garden was built in the Qajar era by Heshmat ol-Molk I, the governor of Qohestan and Sistan in 1880. As with most gardens in history, the Garden was originally constructed by Heshmat ol-Molk I to adorn his property. During the early 20th century, in the late Qajar era, Heshmat ol-Molk I used the garden as his official ruling office.

The Akbarieh Garden, as the Qohestan Government House, for the remainder of the Qajar era all the way until 1978 during the late Pahlavi era, functioned as the residence of local rulers. It was the site for celebrations and feasts in the attendance of domestic and foreign guests. In addition to functioning as a residential garden, it was also used for receptions, meetings and negotiations with foreign diplomatic missions such as consulates.

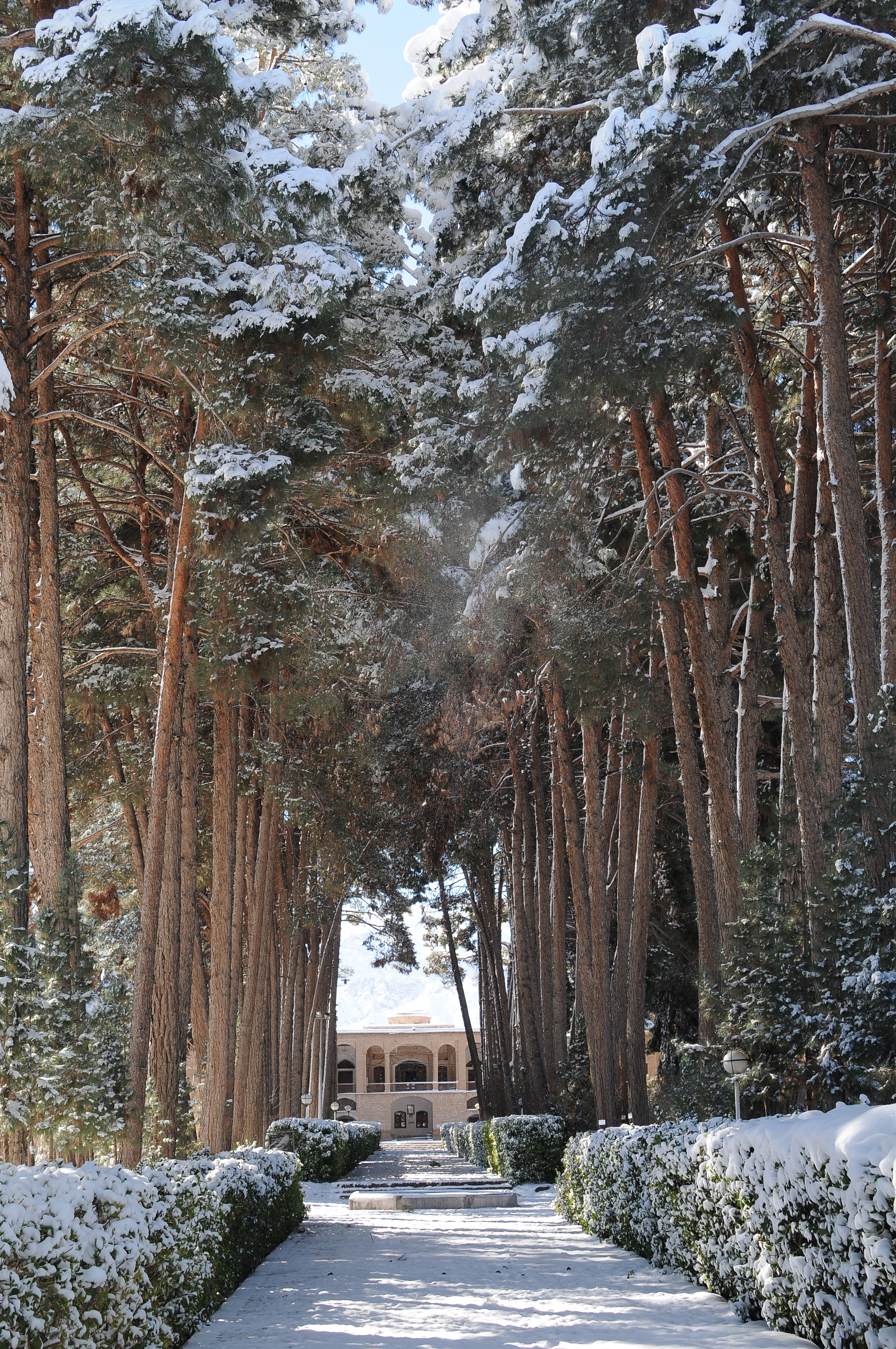
Snowy morning at the garden

The Garden's last owner, Asadollah Alam, bequeathed it upon Astan Quds Razavi in his will. However, since 1992, the garden's specialised management and maintenance is under the supervision of the Iranian Ministry of Cultural Heritage, Tourism and Handicrafts.

== Footprint ==
The Akbarieh Garden, covering an area of approximately 33,000 square meters on a slope, consists of two buildings. The older one belongs to Hashmat al-Molk, the father of Ibrahim Shoket al-Molk, and its construction dates back to the early Qajar period. The other building in this complex is the reception building, which was founded by Shoket al-Molk. This garden was used for residence, entertaining, and conducting official business.

== Architecture ==
Akbariyeh Garden has the classic "Chahar Bagh" layout, which is the characteristic of Persian garden design. There are two sections to the garden, northern side and the southern side. The northern side extends by tall pine trees creating shadows for its pathway. The southern side holds multiple historical houses, such as Heshmat al-Molk's mansion and stables. The complex is enclosed by mud walls and it is supplied by the Akbariye Qanat, a historical underground water channel.
