= Persian gardens =

Type of garden originating from Iran

The Persian Garden
UNESCO World Heritage Site
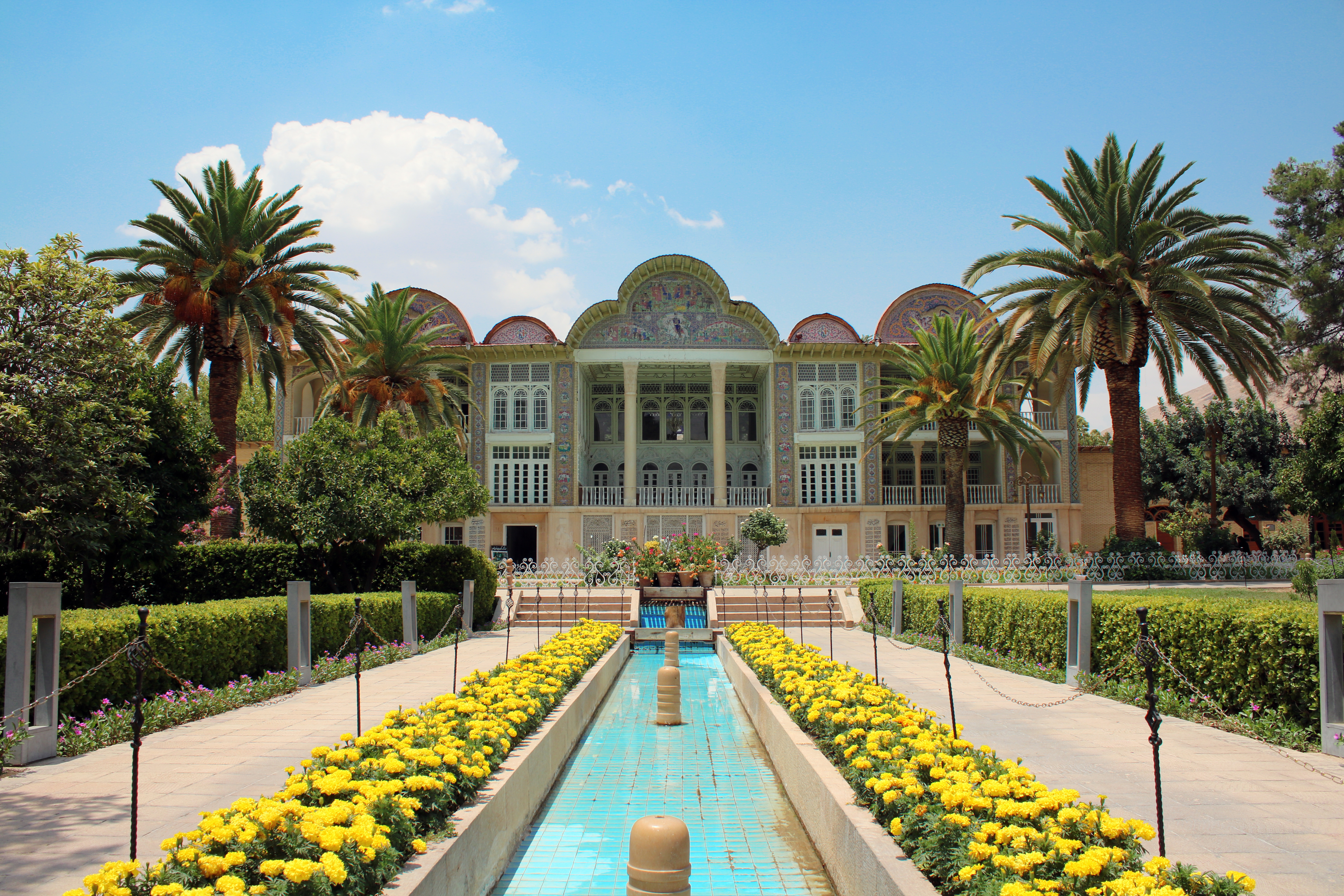
- Eram Garden in Shiraz
- Location: Iran
- Includes: 1. Ancient Garden of Pasargadae; 2. Bagh-e Eram; 3. Bagh-e Chehel Sotun; 4. Bagh-e Fin; 5. Bagh-e Abas Abad; 6. Bagh-e Shahzadeh; 7. Bagh-e Dolat Abad; 8. Bagh-e Pahlavanpur; 9. Bagh-e Akbariyeh
- Criteria: Cultural: (i), (ii), (iii), (iv), (vi)
- Reference: 1372
- Inscription: 2011 (35th Session)
- Area: 716.35 ha (2.7658 sq mi)
- Buffer zone: 9,740.02 ha (37.6064 sq mi)

In garden design, Persian garden or Iranian garden (Persian: باغ ایرانی) is a style of "landscape" garden which emerged in the Achaemenid Empire. Nine historical gardens, all of them in Iran, have been inscribed in UNESCO's World Heritage Sites as The Persian Garden since 2011.

== Concept and etymology ==
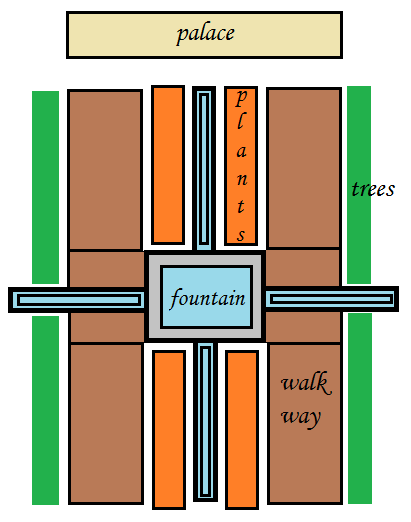
A schematic diagram of a Persian garden. Note the quadripartite structure with focal water feature, connecting aqueducts, and surrounding trees, as well as the placement of the palace.

From the time of the Achaemenid Empire, the idea of an earthly paradise spread through Persian literature and example to other cultures, both the Hellenistic gardens of the Seleucid Empire and the Ptolemies in Alexandria.

The Avestan word pairidaēza-, Old Persian *paridaida-, (Note: Although the genuine Old Persian form must have been *paridaida-, New Persian paliz 'garden' from Middle Persian palēz presupposes a variant *pardaiza- (with syncope of -i-), which seems to be the cognate of *paridaida- from a different Iranian language (Avestan, Median or Parthian) borrowed into Persian still in an early period. See Proto-Iranian *paridaiźa-.) or Median *paridaiza- "walled-around", (i.e., a walled garden), were borrowed into Elamite (partetaš) and Akkadian, and later as Ancient Greek: παράδεισος, romanized: parádeisos. It was rendered as Latin paradīsus, and from there entered into European languages, e.g., French paradis, German Paradies, and English paradise. In the Achaemenid Empire, the term is used for functional worksites as well, and it translated as "plantations"; these sites contained not only orchards and tree plantations, but also sometimes bitumen harvesting and mining. The same word was used to describe the Elamite custom of creating a sacred grove or husa surrounding a royal grave that was the site of worship of the deceased king.

As the word expresses, such gardens would have been enclosed. Gardens provided a place for protected relaxation, both spiritual and leisurely, and represented a paradise on earth. The Common Iranian word for "enclosed space" was *pari-daiza- (Avestan pairi-daēza-). This term was adopted to describe the garden of Eden a Paradise on earth.

The garden's construction may be formal (with an emphasis on structure) or casual (with a focus on nature), following several simple design rules. This allows the maximum possible use of the garden in terms of function and emotion.

== History ==
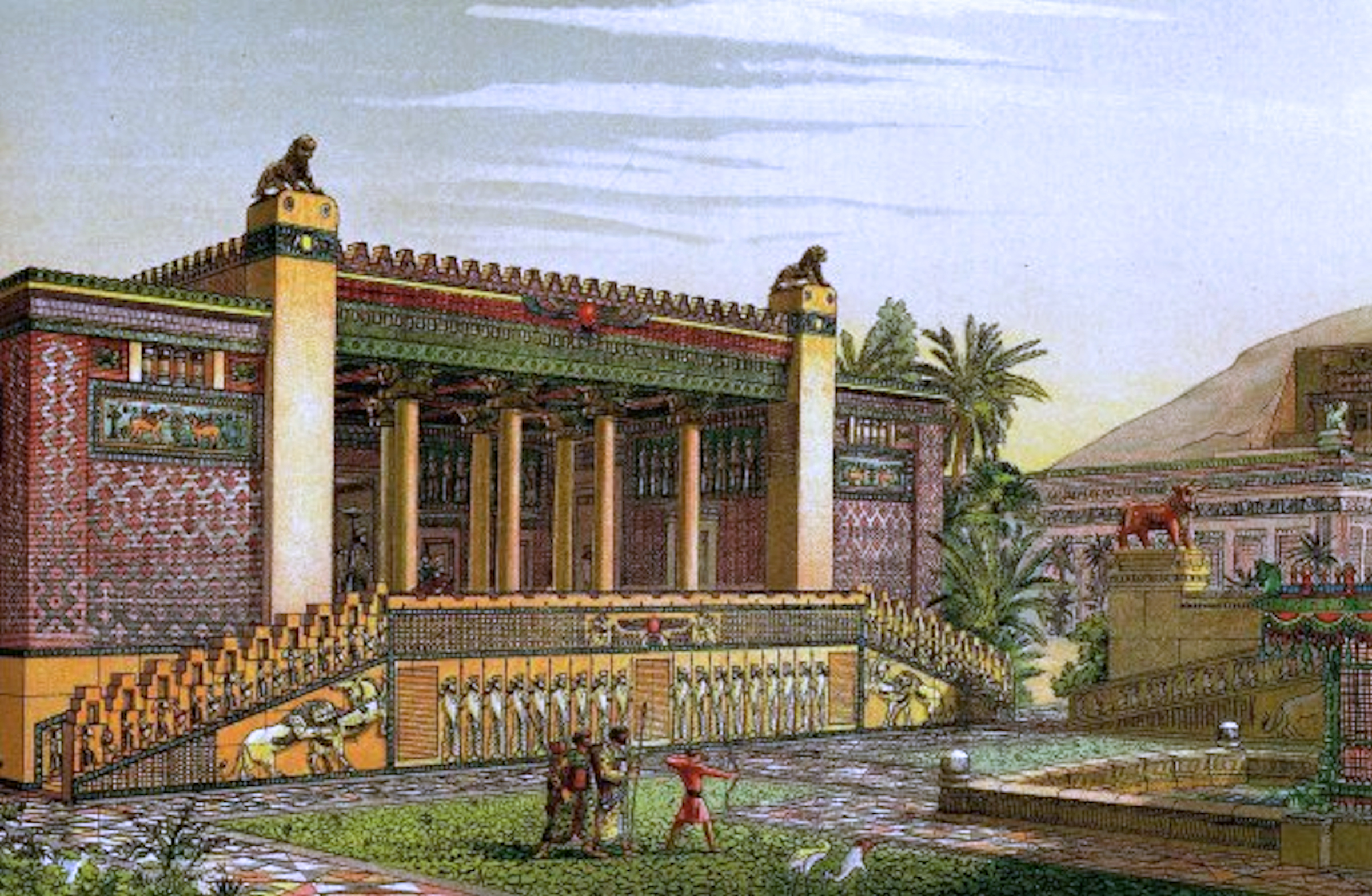
Gardens outside of the Palace of Darius I of Persia in Persepolis

Persian gardens may originate as early as 4000 BCE, but it is clear that this tradition began with the Achaemenid dynasty around the 6th century BCE. Decorated pottery of that time displays the typical cross plan of the Persian garden. The outline of Pasargadae, built around 500 BCE, is still viewable today. Classical Iranians were seen by the Greeks as the 'great gardeners' of antiquity; Cyrus II (known also as Cyrus the Younger) is alleged to have told the Spartan commander Lysander that he gardened daily when not campaigning, and had himself laid out the park at Sardis, which he called his 'paradise' (a Greek corruption of the Old Persian word for garden).

Persian palace-garden traditions also influenced the Hellenistic world. According to Strabo and other literary sources, the Ptolemaic royal palaces at Alexandria included parks and numerous pavilions surrounded by vegetation. Ptolemy I, who had accompanied Alexander the Great on his campaigns in the East and had thus become acquainted with Persian palace gardens, apparently incorporated elements of what he had seen into the palace he later built at Alexandria. Through this Alexandrian intermediary, Persian garden plans also reached Hasmonean Judea, as reflected in the pavilion of Alexander Jannaeus's pool complex at the winter palace in Jericho. While Persian in its underlying plan, its architectural decoration was Greek.

During the suzerainty of the Sasanian Empire, under the influence of Zoroastrianism, water in art grew increasingly important. This trend manifested itself in garden design, with greater emphasis on fountains and ponds in gardens.

During the Umayyad and Abbasid periods, the aesthetic aspect of the garden increased in importance, overtaking utility. During this time, aesthetic rules that govern the garden grew in importance. An example of this is the chahār bāgh (چهارباغ), a form of garden that attempts to emulate the Abrahamic notion of a Garden of Eden, with four rivers and four quadrants that represent the world. The design sometimes extends one axis longer than the cross-axis and may feature water channels that run through each of the four gardens and connect to a central pool.

Under the Abbasid dynasty (8th century AD), this type of garden became an integral part of representational architecture.

The Persian garden is a landscape garden, designed individually and created intentionally as a space embedded in the aesthetic and spiritual context of its past and contemporary cultural, political, and social environment. Hallmarks of these formal gardens are a geometric layout following geometric and visual principles, implemented to nature by water channels and basins which divide the enclosed space into clearly defined quarters, a principle that has become known as Chahar Bagh (four gardens), waterworks with channels, basins, fountains and cascades, pavilions, prominent central axes with a vista, and a plantation with a variety of carefully chosen trees, herbs. and flowers. The old-Iranian word for such gardens "pari-daizi' expresses the notion of an earthly paradise that is inherent to them. As such, they are a metaphor for the divine order and the unification and protection of the ones who do good. Their counterparts on earth fulfill a similar function. These principles are brought to perfection in the gardens of the emperor as the "good gardener".

Notwithstanding a formal standardization, the landscape gardens also reflect diversity and development, bound to function, regional and chronological characteristics, as well as technological, know how personal preferences, ambitions, and demands. Persian gardens are multi-functional: they not only serve contemplation and relaxation, but are also a representation and manifestation of power. Designing and implementing a garden demonstrates the occupation of land, holding audiences and celebrating victories or marriages in these gardens signal superiority, or social and political bonds. Starting from the 12th to 13th century, tombs for members of the royal family or important personalities were placed into such formal gardens, providing believers a chance to benefit from the spirituality of a venerated person and the particular aura of the garden.

The invasion of Persia by the Mongols in the thirteenth century led to a new emphasis on highly ornate structure in the garden. Examples of this include tree peonies and chrysanthemums. The Mongols then carried a Persian garden tradition to other parts of their empire (notably India).

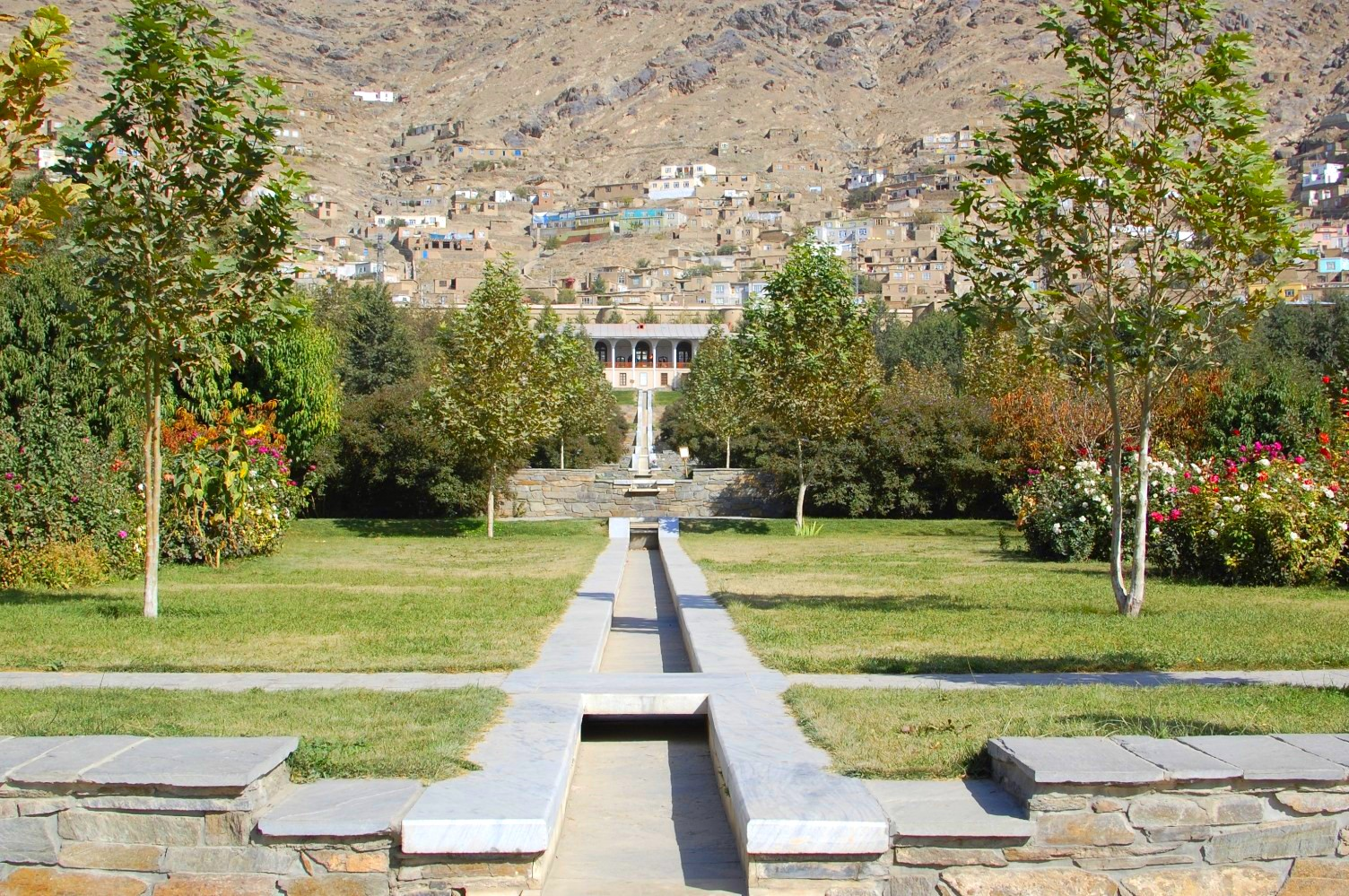
Bagh-e Babur in Kabul, Afghanistan

The Mughal emperor Babur introduced the Persian garden to India, attempting to replicate the cool, refreshing aura of his homeland in the Ferghana Valley through the construction of Persian-style gardens, like those at other Timurid cities like Samarkand and Herat. Babur was a zealous gardener and personally designed and supervised at least ten gardens in his capital of Kabul in modern Afghanistan, such as the Bagh-e Babur, where he recorded the allure of the pomegranate, cherry and orange trees he had planted. Though his empire soon expanded as far as north-central India, he abhorred the stagnant heat and drab environment of the hot, dusty plains of India; he was thus interred at Bagh-e Babur in Kabul by his widow in 1544.

The Aram Bagh of Agra was the first of many Persian gardens he created in India itself. Mughal gardens have four basic requirements, symbolizing four allegorical essentials for the afterlife: shade, fruit, fragrance, and running water. This pattern was used to build many Persian gardens throughout the Indian subcontinent, such as the Shalimar Gardens of Lahore, the Shalimar Bagh and Nishat Bagh of Kashmir, and the Taj Mahal gardens. The Taj Mahal gardens embody the Persian concept of an ideal paradise garden, and were built with irrigation channels and canals from the Yamuna River. These gardens have recently been restored to their former beauty after decades of pollution by the Indian authorities, who cut down the fruit- and shade-bearing vegetation of the garden.

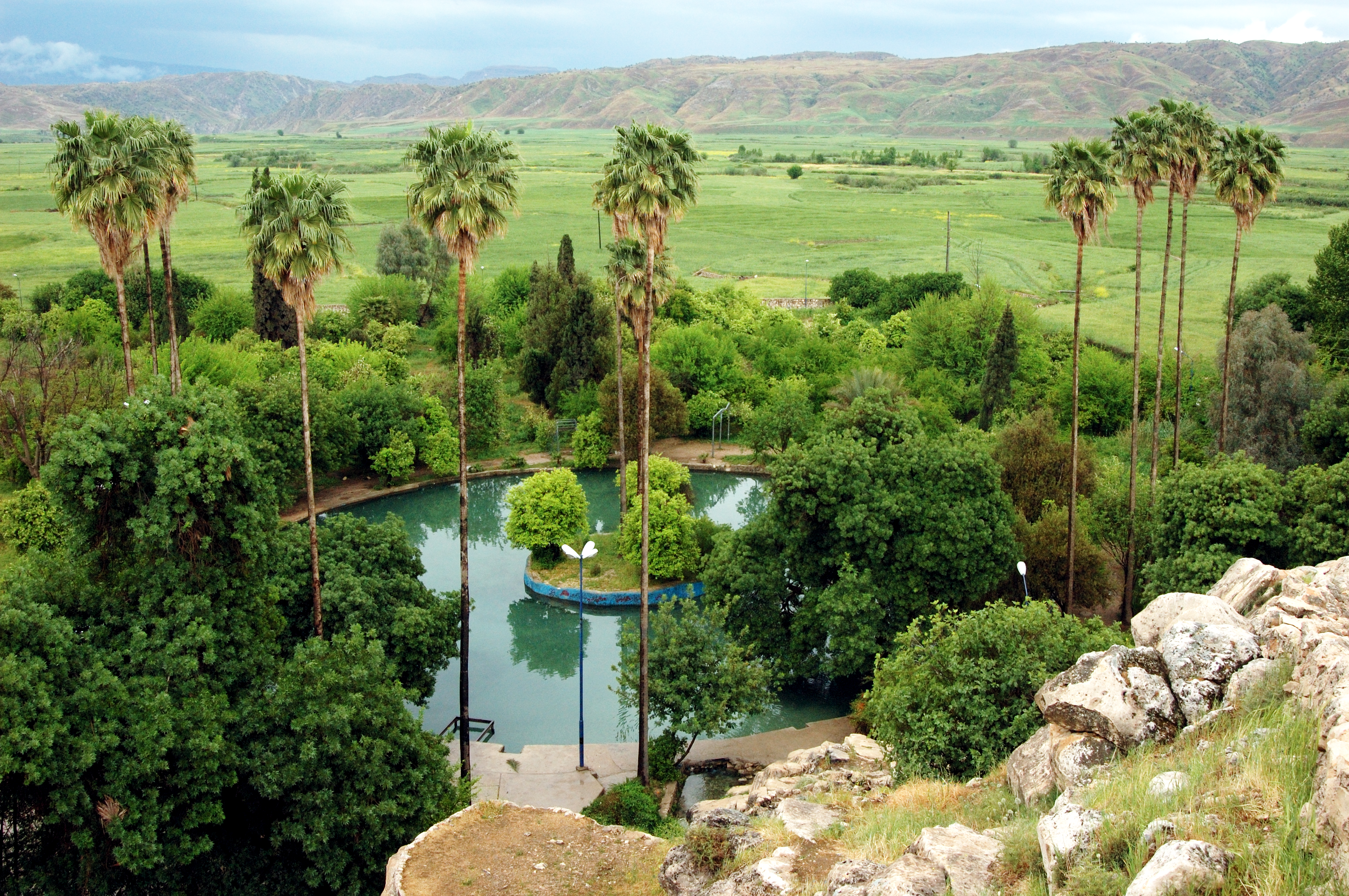
Cheshme Belghais Garden is an example of modern persian garden design.

The Safavid dynasty (seventeenth to eighteenth century) built and developed grand and epic layouts that went beyond a simple extension to a palace and became an integral aesthetic and functional part of it. In the following centuries, European garden design began to influence Persia, particularly the designs of France, and secondarily that of Russia and the United Kingdom. Western influences led to changes in the use of water and the species used in bedding.

Traditional forms and style are still applied in modern Iranian gardens. They also appear in historic sites, museums, and affixed to the houses of the rich.

== Elements of the Persian garden ==
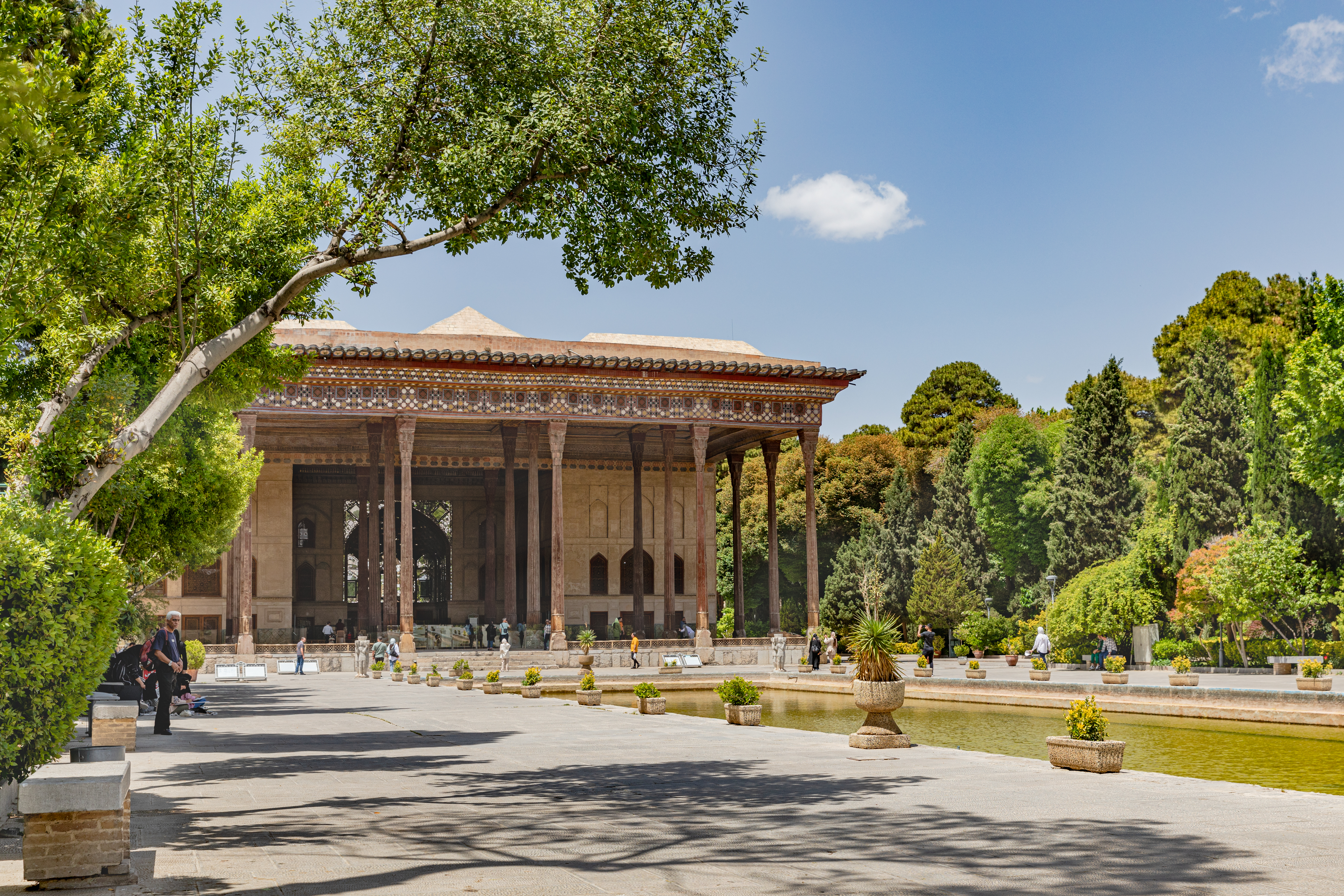
Chehel Sotoun pavilion and garden in Isfahan

Sunlight and its effects were an important factor of structural design in Persian gardens. Textures and shapes were specifically chosen by architects to harness the light.

Iran's dry heat makes shade important in gardens, which would be nearly unusable without it. Trees and trellises largely feature as biotic shade; pavilions and walls are also structurally prominent in blocking the sun.

The heat also makes water important, both in the design and maintenance of the garden. Irrigation may be required, and may be provided via a form of tunnel called a qanat, that transports water from a local aquifer. Well-like structures then connect to the qanat, enabling the drawing of water. Alternatively, an animal-driven Persian well would draw water to the surface. Such wheel systems also moved water around surface water systems, such as those in the chahar bāgh style. Trees were often planted in a ditch called a juy, which prevented water evaporation and allowed the water quick access to the tree roots.

The Persian style often attempts to integrate indoors with outdoors through the connection of a surrounding garden with an inner courtyard. Designers often place architectural elements such as vaulted arches between the outer and interior areas to open up the divide between them.

== Descriptions ==
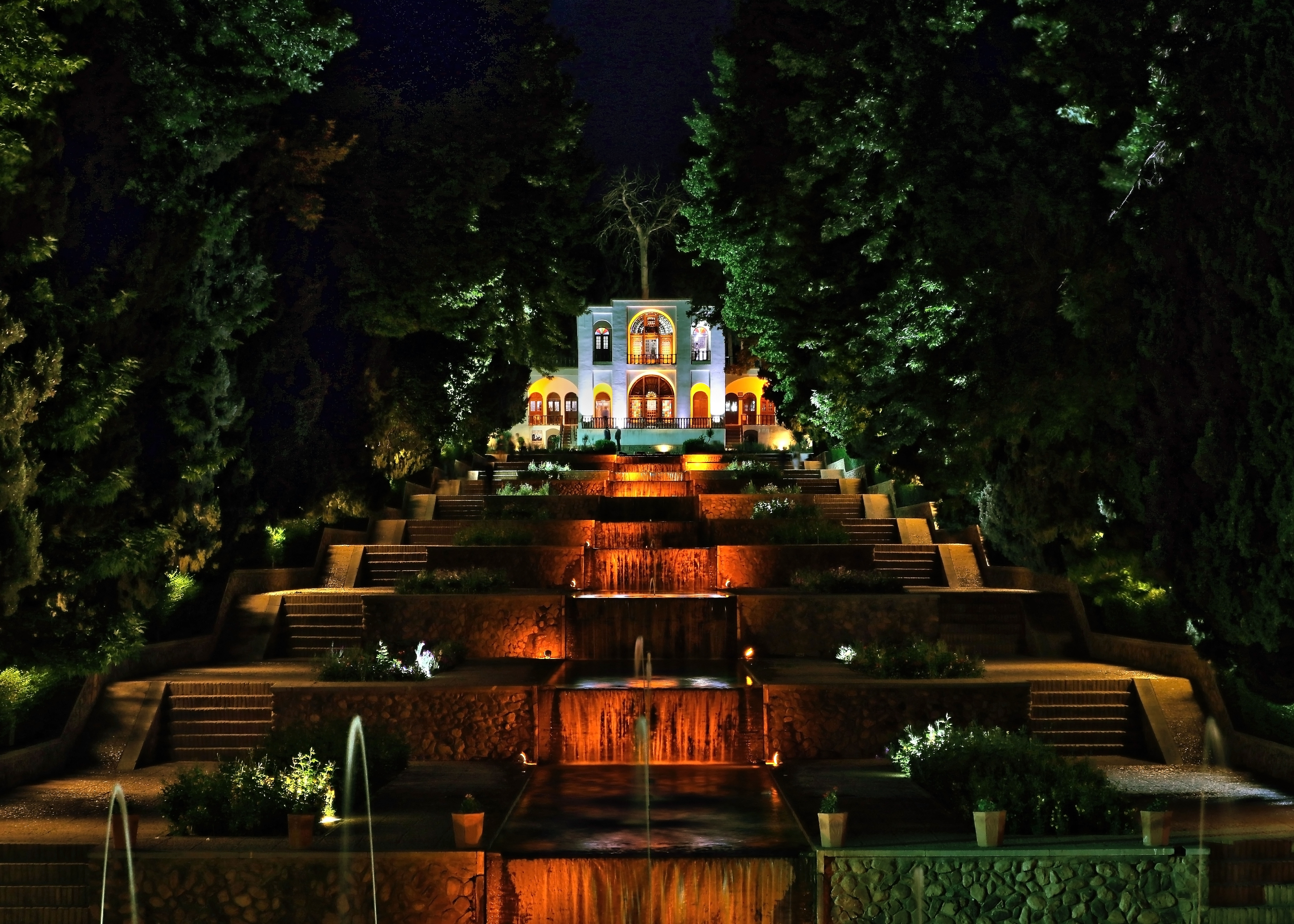
Shazdeh Garden is one of the largest gardens of Kerman province.

An early description (from the first half of the fourth century BCE) of a Persian garden is found in Xenophon's Oeconomicus in which he has Socrates relate the story of the Spartan general Lysander's visit to the Persian prince Cyrus the Younger, who shows the Greek his "paradise at Sardis". In this story Lysander is "astonished at the beauty of the trees within, all planted at equal intervals, the long straight rows of waving branches, the perfect regularity, the rectangular symmetry of the whole, and the many sweet scents which hung about them as they paced the park".

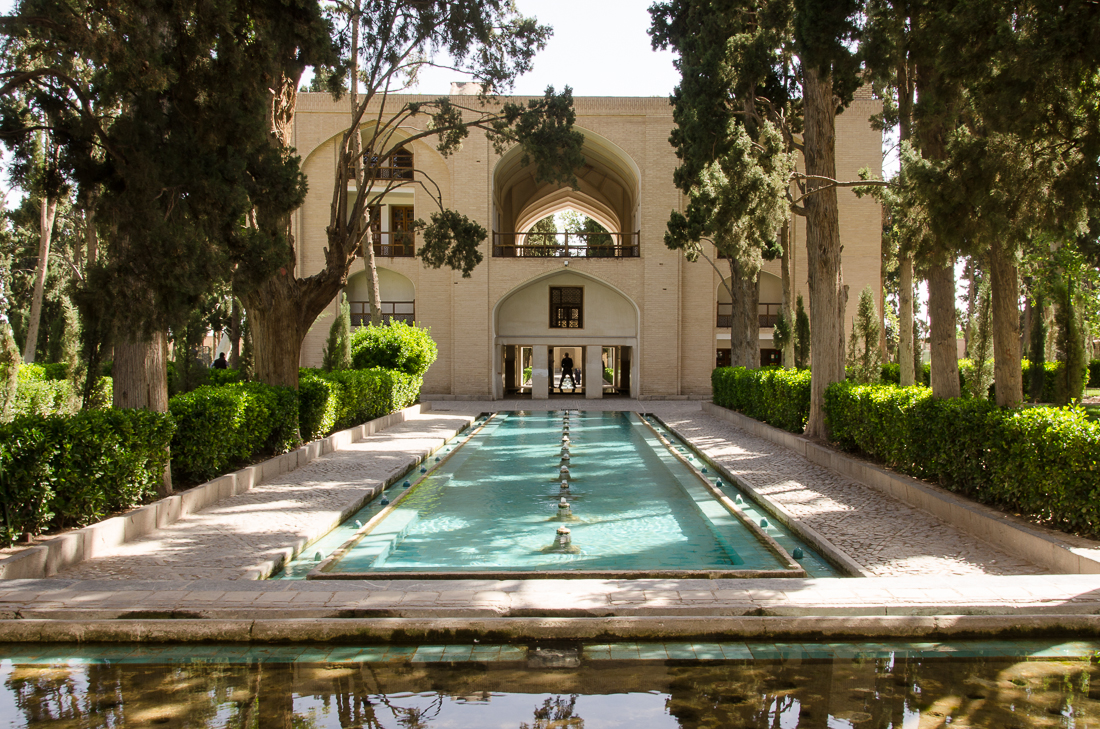
Fin Garden in Kashan

The oldest representational descriptions and illustrations of Persian gardens come from travelers who reached Iran from the west. These accounts include Ibn Battuta in the fourteenth century, Ruy González de Clavijo in the fifteenth century and Engelbert Kaempfer in the seventeenth century. Battuta and Clavijo made only passing references to gardens and did not describe their design, but Kaempfer made careful drawings and converted them into detailed engravings after his return to Europe. They show charbagh-type gardens that featured an enclosing wall, rectangular pools, an internal network of canals, garden pavilions and lush planting. There are surviving examples of this garden type at Yazd (Dowlatabad) and at Kashan (Fin Garden). The location of the gardens Kaempfer illustrated in Isfahan can be identified.

== Styles ==
The six primary styles of the Persian garden may be seen in the following table, which puts them in the context of their function and style. Gardens are not limited to a particular style, but often integrate different styles, or have areas with different functions and styles.

	Classical	Formal	Casual
Public	Hayāt	Meidān	Park
Private	Hayāt	Chahār Bāgh	Bāgh

=== Hayāt ===
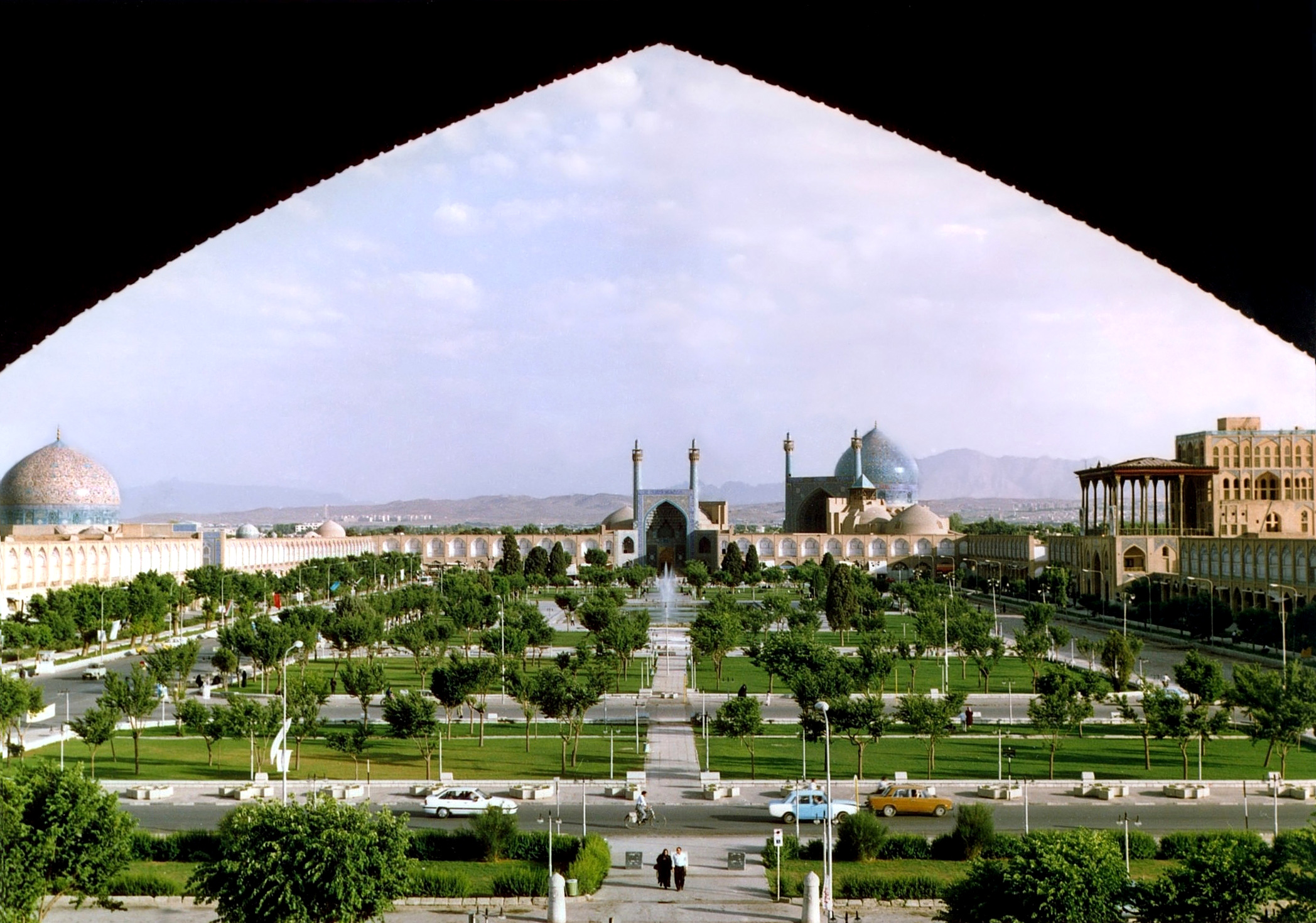
Naqsh-e Jahan Square, the charbagh Royal Square (Maidan) in Isfahan, constructed between 1598 and 1629

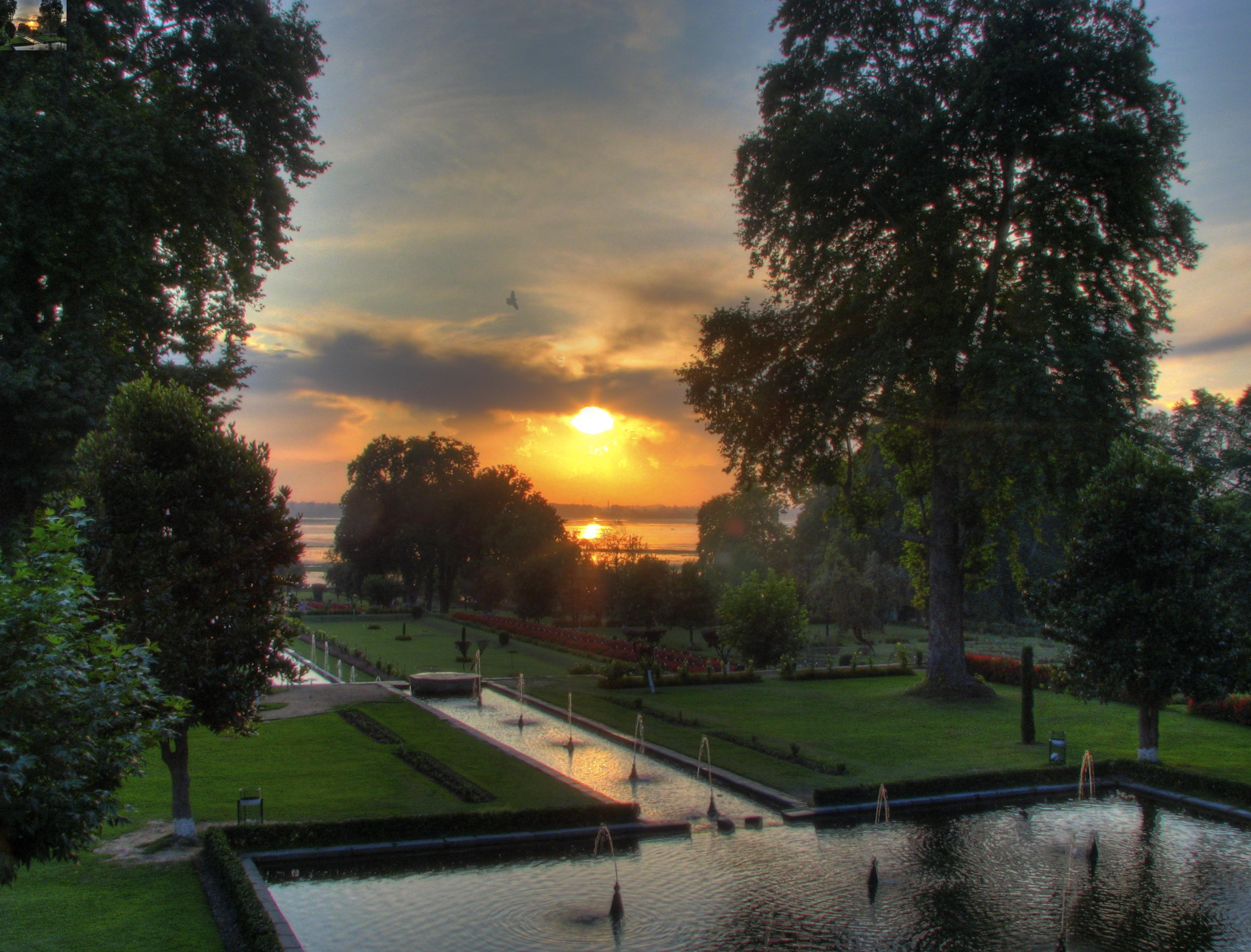
Sunset at Nishat Bagh Gardens

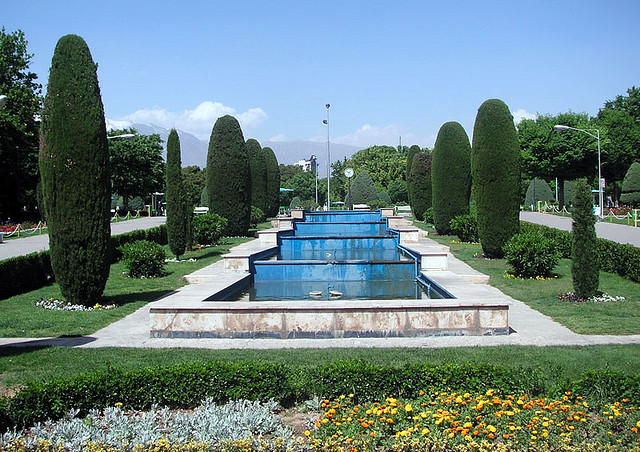
Laleh Park, Tehran

Publicly, it is a classical Persian layout with heavy emphasis on aesthetics over function. Man-made structures in the garden are particularly important, with arches and pools (which may be used to bathe). The ground is often covered in gravel flagged with stone. Plantings are typically very simple - such as a line of trees, which also provide shade.

Privately, these gardens are often pool-centred and, again, structural. The pool serves as a focus and source of humidity for the surrounding atmosphere. There are few plants, often due to the limited water available in urban areas.

=== Meidān ===
This is a public, formal garden that puts more emphasis on the biotic element than the hayāt and that minimises structure. Plants range from trees, to shrubs, to bedding plants, to grasses. Again, there are elements such as a pool and gravel pathways which divide the lawn. When structures are used, they are often built, as in the case of pavilions, to provide shade.

=== Chahar Bāgh ===
These gardens are private and formal. The basic structure consists of four quadrants divided by waterways or pathways. Traditionally, the rich used such gardens in work-related functions (such as entertaining ambassadors). These gardens balance structure with greenery, with the plants often around the periphery of a pool and path based structure.

=== Boostān ===
Much like many other parks, the Persian park serves a casual public function with emphasis on plant life. They provide pathways and seating, but are otherwise usually limited in terms of structural elements. The purpose of such places is relaxation and socialisation.

=== Bāgh ===
Like the other casual garden, the park, bāgh emphasizes the natural and green aspect of the garden. Unlike the park it is a private area often affixed to houses and often consisting of lawns, trees, and ground plants. The waterways and pathways stand out less than in the more formal counterparts and are largely functional. The primary function of such areas is familial relaxation.

== World Heritage Sites ==
1. Pasargad Garden (fa) at Pasargadae, Iran (WHS 1372-001)
2. Eram Garden, Shiraz, Iran (WHS 1372-002)
3. Chehel Sotoun, Isfahan, Iran (WHS 1372-003)
4. Fin Garden, Kashan, Iran (WHS 1372-004)
5. Abbasabad Garden, Abbasabad, Behshahr, Iran (WHS 1372-005)
6. Shazdeh Garden, Mahan, Kerman province, Iran (WHS 1372-006)
7. Dolatabad Garden, Yazd, Iran (WHS 1372-007)
8. Pahlevanpour Garden (fa), Iran (WHS 1372-008)
9. Akbarieh Garden, South Khorasan province, Iran (WHS 1372-009)
10. Taj Mahal, Agra, India (WHS 252)
11. Humayun's Tomb, New Delhi, India (WHS 232bis)
12. Shalimar Gardens, Lahore, Pakistan (WHS 171-002)
Location of Persian Garden World Heritage Sites

== See also ==
- Delgosha Garden
- El-Gölü
- Firdaws-i Bareen
- Mellat Park
- Nazar Garden
- Paradise garden
- Persian architecture
- Persian Inscriptions on Indian Monuments
- List of Persian gardens in Iran
