= Tazehabad, Behshahr =

Village in Mazandaran province, Iran

Tazehabad Persian: تازه آباد
- Village
- Location within Iran
- Coordinates: 36°41′14″N 53°36′36″E
- Country: Iran
- Province: Mazandaran
- County: Behshahr
- District: Central
- Rural District: Panj Hezareh

Population (2016)
  - Total: 363
- Time zone: UTC+3:30 (IRST)

Tazehabad (Persian: تازه آباد) (Note: Also romanized as Tāzehābād, also known as Tazaehabad-e Saru in old sources) is a village in Panj Hezareh Rural District of the Central District in Behshahr County, Mazandaran province, Iran. Tazehabad is between the villages of Pasand, just to its east, and Saru to its west.

== Demographics ==
=== Population ===
At the time of the 2006 National Census, the village's population was 376 in 87 households. The following census in 2011 counted 380 people in 104 households. The 2016 census measured the population of the village as 363 people in 115 households.
