= Zagh Marz =

Village in Mazandaran province, Iran

Zagh Marz Persian: زاغمرز
- Village
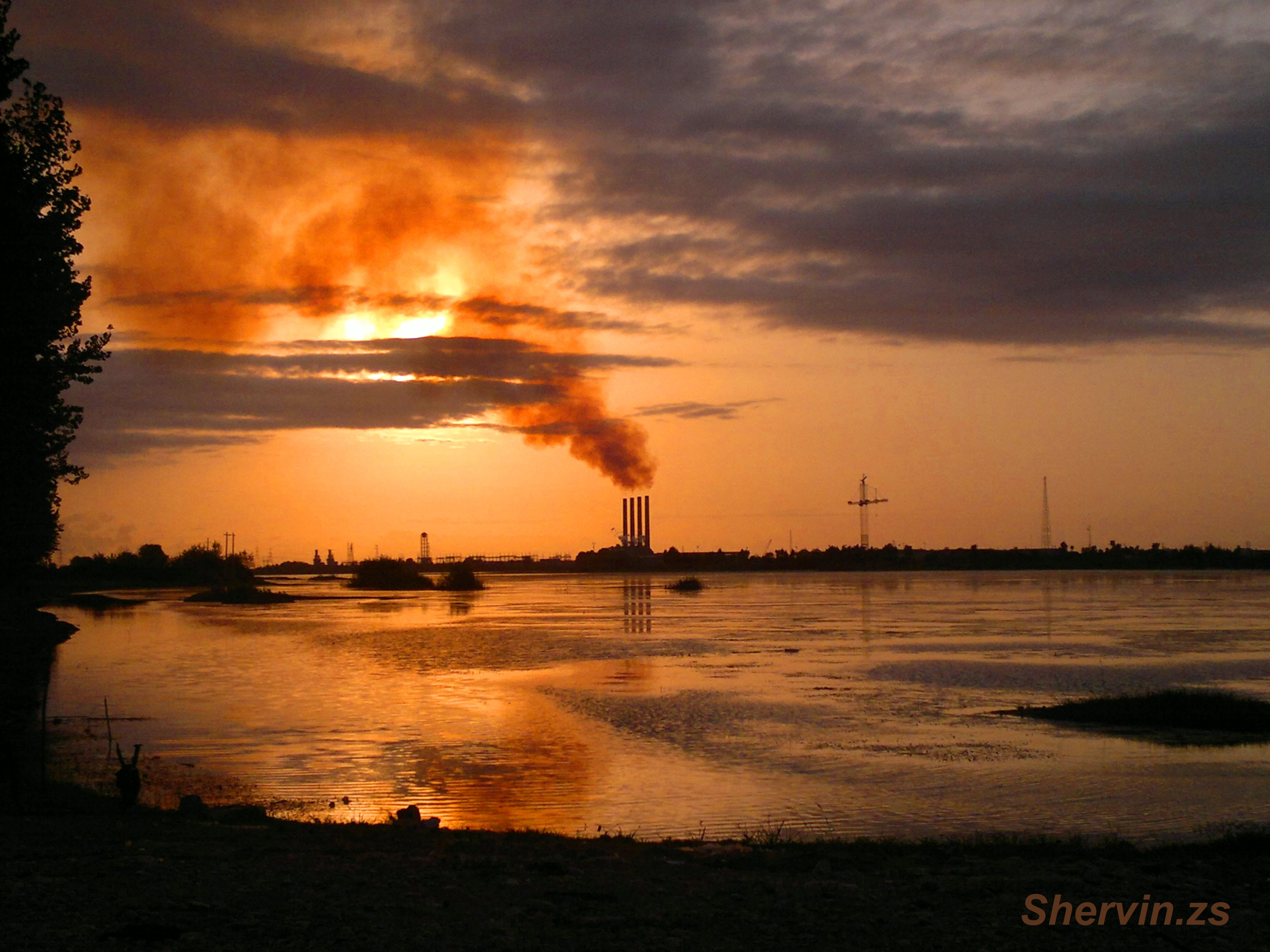
- View of Neka power plant from Lapoo wetland near the village of Zagh Marz

- Location within Iran
- Coordinates: 36°48′16″N 53°18′08″E
- Country: Iran
- Province: Mazandaran
- County: Behshahr
- District: Central
- Rural District: Miyan Kaleh

Population (2016)
  - Total: 5,932
- Time zone: UTC+3:30 (IRST)

Zagh Marz (Persian: زاغمرز) (Note: Also romanized as Zāgh Marz and Zaghemarz) is a village in, and the capital of, Miyan Kaleh Rural District in the Central District of Behshahr County, Mazandaran province, Iran.

== Demographics ==
=== Ethnicity ===
In recent years, various ethnic groups have migrated to Zagh Marz and its suburbs. However, the vast majority of Zagh Marz and the Abdolmaleki Chahar Galeh area are members of the Abdolmaleki tribe who are Kurds in origin and settled in this area uninhabited and invaded by the Turkmen nearly two centuries ago.

=== Population ===
At the time of the 2006 National Census, the village's population was 5,830 in 1,521 households. The following census in 2011 counted 5,376 people in 1,641 households. The 2016 census measured the population of the village as 5,932 people in 1,902 households. It was the most populous village in its rural district.

== Economy ==
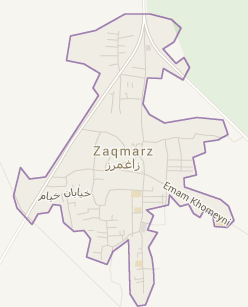
Zaghmarz Map

Due to the presence of Sadra Company, Amirabad Port, Shahid Salimi Neka Power Plant, National Iranian Oil Company and Miankaleh Peninsula and Wildlife Sanctuary, this village is touristic, as well as the economic and commercial hub of East and a gateway to Central Asian countries, Russia and Northern Europe.

=== Agriculture ===
Zagh Marz is famous in Iran for its rice, watermelon and citrus fruits.

== Main sights ==
Lapoo Zaghmarz Wetland and abbandan is located north of Zagh Marz. Every year, many birds migrate to Iran to escape the cold of the winter season in the northern regions such as Siberia. Lapoo wetland is one of the important wetlands of the country and is home to a large number of birds every year and is known as an important habitat for water and land birds.

== See also ==
- Amirabad Port
- Lapoo Zaghmarz Wetland and abbandan
- Miankaleh Peninsula
