= Gharib Mahalleh =

Gharib Mahalleh (Persian: غريب محله) may refer to:

- Gharib Mahalleh, Gilan
- Gharib Mahalleh, Mazandaran
