= Al Tappeh =

Village in Mazandaran province, Iran

Al Tappeh Persian: التپه
- Village
- Location within Iran
- Coordinates: 36°41′07″N 53°35′14″E
- Country: Iran
- Province: Mazandaran
- County: Behshahr
- District: Central
- Rural District: Kuhestan

Population (2016)
  - Total: 1,930
- Time zone: UTC+3:30 (IRST)

Al Tappeh (Persian: التپه) (Note: Also known as ‘Alī Tappeh and Tappeh) is a village in Kuhestan Rural District of the Central District in Behshahr County, Mazandaran province, Iran.

== Demographics ==
=== Population ===
Population history
Year	Pop.	±%
1950	465	—
1976	961	+106.7%
1986	1,470	+53.0%
2006	1,903	+29.5%
2011	1,634	−14.1%
2016	1,930	+18.1%

At the time of the 2006 National Census, the village's population was 1,903 in 467 households. The following census in 2011 counted 1,634 people in 452 households. The 2016 census measured the population of the village as 1,930 people in 605 households.

== Geography ==
The village is on the northern slopes of the Alborz mountain range, at the foothills of Jahan Moora. It has a vast landscape to the north overlooking the lush and fertile plain of Mazandaran and beyond, the Gorgan Gulf, the Miankaleh peninsula, and the Caspian Sea.

Al Tappeh is located 1 km east of Behshahr, on the south side of road 22 that connects Behshahr to Gorgan.

== Infrastructure ==
In the 1976 census, Al Tappeh had power and water infrastructure, as well as an elementary school. In 1986, the village also had phone and postal services.
