= Shohadaye Ashrafol-Belad Behshahr Bridge =

Shohadaye Ashrafol-Belad Behshahr Bridge پل شهدای اشرف‌البلاد بهشهر
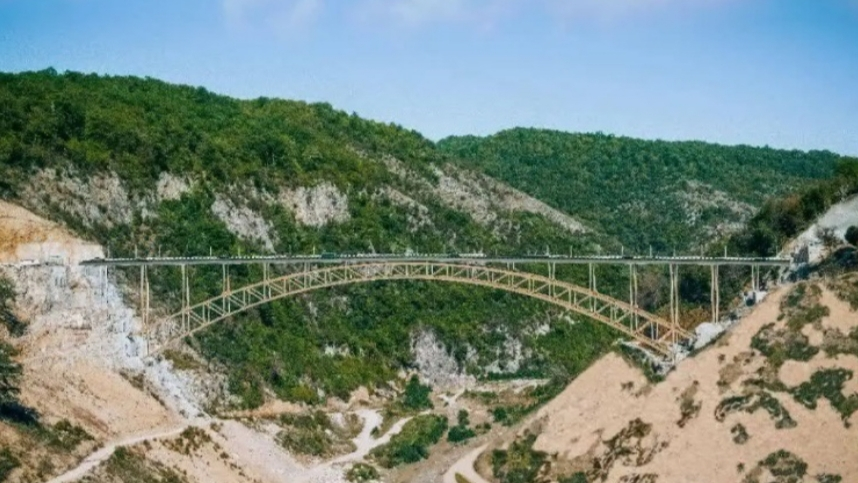
- Shohadaye Ashrafol-Belad Behshahr steel through arch bridge
- Coordinates: 36°35′39.6″N 53°38′11.7″E
- Carries: Pedestrians, Vehicles; Connectivity for 60 upstream villages of Behshahr County
- Crosses: Valam River (Rudbar)
- Locale: Valam village, Behshahr, Mazandaran, Iran
- Official name: Shohadaye Ashrafol-Belad Bridge

Characteristics
- Design: Through arch bridge
- Material: Steel
- Total length: 281 m (922 ft)
- Width: 12 m (39 ft)
- Height: 100 m (330 ft)
- No. of spans: 18 spans (208 m (682 ft) total span length)

History
- Designer: Machine Sazi Arak Company
- Constructed by: Machine Sazi Arak Company
- Construction start: March 3, 2017 (13 Esfand 1395 SH)
- Construction end: August 1, 2025 (10 Mordad 1404 SH)
- Construction cost: 700 billion Iranian toman (approximately)
- Opened: February 4, 2026 (16 Bahman 1404 SH)
- Inaugurated: February 4, 2026 (16 Bahman 1404 SH)

Location
- Interactive map of Shohadaye Ashrafol-Belad Behshahr Bridge

Shohadaye Ashrafol-Belad Behshahr Bridge (Persian: پل شهدای اشرف‌البلاد بهشهر), also known as Gelvard Bridge, is a steel through arch bridge in Behshahr County, Mazandaran Province, Iran. It is the largest bridge in northern Iran, located on the Valam River (Rudbar), which is the catchment area of the Gelvard Dam.

The bridge is 281 metres (922 ft) long, 12 metres (39 ft) wide, and stands 100 metres (330 ft) above the river bed. It serves as the final piece of the great Gelvard Dam project, and with its operation, the complete impoundment of the dam becomes possible.

This structure is three times larger than the historic Veresk Bridge and is the fourth bridge of its type in Iran. After the Karun-4 arch bridge, it is considered the second steel arch bridge in the country and plays an important role in improving regional communications and transportation between the southern areas of Behshahr County and the central Hezarjarib region.

== Location ==
The bridge is located in the Hezarjarib region, near the village of Valam in Yaneh Sar District of Behshahr County. It is constructed over the Rudbar River (Valam), which serves as the catchment area for the Gelvard Dam.

== Construction history ==
Construction work on the bridge began on March 3, 2017 (13 Esfand 1395 SH) and was officially inaugurated on February 4, 2026 (16 Bahman 1404 SH) with the presence of provincial officials. The main purpose of constructing this bridge was to maintain road access for villages upstream of the Gelvard Dam after the complete impoundment of its reservoir. With the dam's impoundment, the road connections of several villages in the area that were within the reservoir zone would have been disrupted, and the construction of this bridge guaranteed access for residents of 60 villages to the main road network.

In September 2025 (Shahrivar 1404 SH), Mehdi Younesi Rostami, Governor of Mazandaran, announced the completion of asphalt paving and declared the bridge ready for official inauguration.

== Technical specifications ==
The technical specifications of the bridge are as follows:

General Specifications
Structure type	Steel, Through Arch
Length	281 metres (922 ft)
Width	12 metres (39 ft)
Height above river	100 metres (330 ft)
Number of spans	18 spans
Construction Information
Start of construction	March 3, 2017
End of construction	August 1, 2025
Official inauguration	February 4, 2026
Construction cost	700 billion tomans (approximately)
Design company	Machine Sazi Arak
Construction company	Machine Sazi Arak
Consultant company	-
Client and bridge authority	Mazandaran Regional Water Company

== Significance and Function ==
Rural connectivity: The most important function of this bridge is to provide connectivity for 60 villages upstream of the Gelvard Dam to the main road network. With the impoundment of the Gelvard Dam, the old roads were submerged, and this bridge is now the only route for residents in the area. During the inauguration ceremony, the Governor of Mazandaran emphasized that "the access time for people to urban centers has been significantly reduced."

Regional development: This bridge plays an important role in improving regional communications and transportation between the southern areas of Behshahr County and the central Hezarjarib region. Facilitating resident mobility and developing economic exchanges in eastern Mazandaran are among other achievements of this infrastructure project.

Comparison with Veresk Bridge: At the inauguration ceremony, the Governor of Mazandaran described this bridge as being three times larger than the historic Veresk Bridge in terms of dimensions, indicating the magnitude of this engineering project.

Tourism: Given the bridge's height of 100 metres (330 ft) above the river and its scenic view of the Gelvard Dam and surrounding nature, this structure could become one of the tourist attractions in the region.

== Inauguration ==
The bridge was officially inaugurated on Thursday, February 4, 2026 (16 Bahman 1404 SH), commemorating the anniversary of the Fajr Ten Day, with the presence of Mehdi Younesi Rostami, Governor of Mazandaran, and several other officials from the province and Behshahr County.
