= Lapoo Zaghmarz Wetland and abbandan =

International wetland

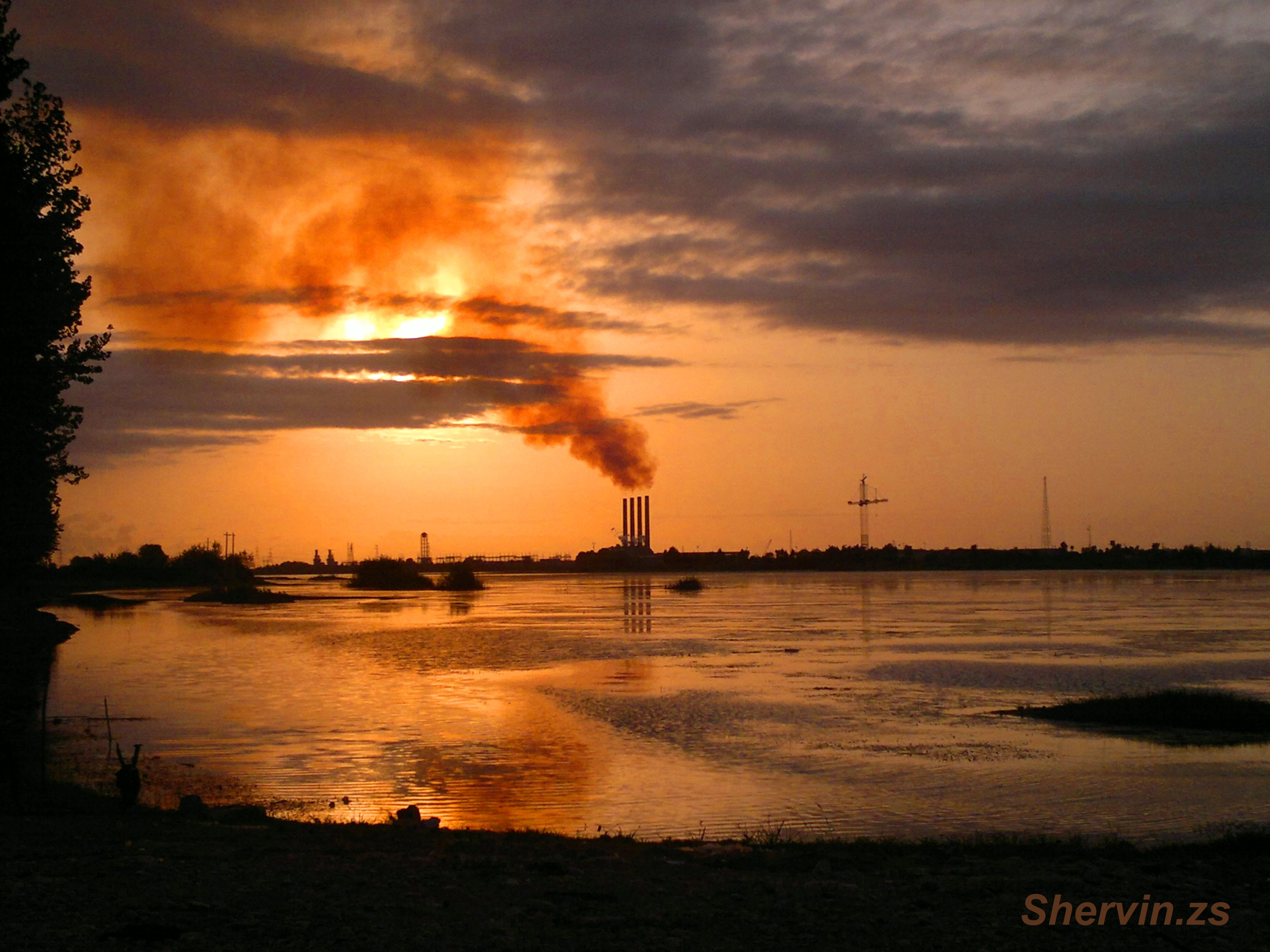
A view of the wetland at sunset, 2012. The Shahid Salimi Combined Cycle Power Plant is visible in the distance.

Lapoo Zaghmarz International Wetland and abbandan near the Caspian Sea is a swamp where many birds spend the winter every year. Miankaleh Peninsula, Gorgan Bay and Lapoo-Zaghmarz Ab-bandan In 1975, they were registered in the International Wetlands Convention (Ramsar Site).

The end of the water outlet from the eastern part of Lapoo abbandan is Shirkhan lapu Wetland, Palangan Wetland, Miankaleh Wetland and Gulf of gorgan, respectively, and finally to the Caspian Sea.
