= Rekavand =

Rekavand رکاوند
- Neighborhood
- Interactive map of Rekavand
- Coordinates: 36.712°N 53.632°E
- Country: Iran
- Province: Mazandaran
- County: Behshahr
- City: Khalil Shahr
- Time zone: UTC+3:30 (IRST)

Rekavand (Persian: رکاوند, romanized: Rekāvand) is a neighborhood in the city of Khalil Shahr in Behshahr County of Mazandaran Province, Iran.

Formerly, it was a village in Panj Hezareh Rural District, which was merged with nearby villages to establish the city in 2005.

== Geography ==
Rekavand is in the northwestern part of Khalil Shahr in the Mazandaran Plain, bordering Behshahr-Gorgan Road to its south, and Kelak to its west. It is 7 km (4.3 mi) east of Behshahr. It's temperate and humid climate has allowed the cultivation of rice, wheat, Tomato, citrus and Pomegranate. Silk and cotton were also common.

The main source of water in Rekavand were Qanats, which date back to 18th century. The village gained access to "Seyyed ali Cheshmeh" water spring through pipes in 1960s, and the use of qanats were forgotten.

Rekavand has a neighbourhood named Baqerabad, which was destroyed in the 8th Century AH for unknown reasons. It is said that the village might have been destroyed during Mongol invasions similar to other nearby villages and cities.

== Demographics ==
People of Rekavand speak Mazanderani and Persian language.

=== Population ===
In 1950, its recorded population was 785. During Iran's national census in 1956, Rekavand had a population of 634 people.

The 1966 census recorded a population of 652 people in 122 households. Rekavand has had mosque, elementary and high school. The census results also recorded a population of 386 people and 58 households in "Posht Kiyaban-e Rekavand", a village south of Rekavand that was not mentioned in previous census.

At the 1976 census, it had a population of 945 people in 167 households. During that time the village had electricity and tap water infrastructure. At the 1986 census, Rekavand's population increased to 1,302 people in 241 households, of which 662 were educated.

Rekavand was annexed to Khalil Shahr city during its establishment in 2005. In January 2011, Rekavand's population was 1,703 people.
