= Emamdeh =

Village in Mazandaran province, Iran

Emamdeh Persian: امام ده
- Village
- Location within Iran
- Coordinates: 36°45′23″N 53°35′31″E
- Country: Iran
- Province: Mazandaran
- County: Behshahr
- District: Central
- Rural District: Kuhestan
- Elevation: −20 m (−66 ft)

Population (2016)
  - Total: 412
- Time zone: UTC+3:30 (IRST)

Emamdeh (Persian: امام ده) (Note: Also romanized as Emām Deh and Emāmdeh; also known as Chāh Qal‘eh, Shā Kīleh, and Shāh Kīleh) is a village in Kuhestan Rural District of the Central District in Behshahr County, Mazandaran province, Iran.

== Demographics ==
=== Population ===
At the time of the 2006 National Census, the village's population was 416 in 102 households. The following census in 2011 counted 448 people in 124 households. The 2016 census measured the population of the village as 412 people in 129 households.

== Overview ==
The village is approximately 3 km (1.9 mi) south of Gorgan Gulf, and 6.5 km (4.0 mi) north of the city of Behshahr. The village's main monument is Moosa Khan hill which is related to Islamic periods.

Emamdeh's people are employed in farming, animal husbandry, fishing, and fish farming. Agricultural products include wheat, rice, barley, canola, vegetable crops, and animal products.
