= Zinevand =

Village in Mazandaran province, Iran

Zinevand Persian: زينوند
- Village
- Location within Iran
- Coordinates: 36°47′43″N 53°19′14″E
- Country: Iran
- Province: Mazandaran
- County: Behshahr
- District: Central
- Rural District: Miyan Kaleh

Population (2016)
  - Total: 1,484
- Time zone: UTC+3:30 (IRST)

Zinevand (Persian: زينوند) (Note: Also romanized as Zeynavand and Zīnevand; also known as Zenīvand) is a village in Miyan Kaleh Rural District of the Central District in Behshahr County, Mazandaran province, Iran. Zinevand is located southeast of the village of Zagh Marz.

== Demographics ==
=== Population ===
At the time of the 2006 National Census, the village's population was 1,427 in 368 households. The following census in 2011 counted 1,491 people in 413 households. The 2016 census measured the population of the village as 1,484 people in 487 households.
