= Kelak, Mazandaran =

Kelak کلاک
- Neighborhood
- Interactive map of Kelak
- Coordinates: 36°42′42.2556″N 53°38′36.348″E
- Country: Iran
- Province: Mazandaran
- County: Behshahr
- City: Khalil Shahr
- Time zone: UTC+3:30 (IRST)

Kelak (Persian: کلاک, romanized: Kelak) is a neighborhood in the city of Khalil Shahr in Behshahr County of Mazandaran Province, Iran. Formerly, it was a village northeast of Khahlil Mahalleh village, which was merged with nearby villages to from Khalil Shahr city.

== Geography ==
Kelak is located in the northeastern part of Khahlil Shahr in the Mazandaran Plain, bordering Behshahr-Gorgan Road to its south, and Rekavand to its west.

== History ==
During Iran's first national census in 1956, Kelak's population was 400 people.

At the 1976 census, Kelak village was in Panj Hezareh Rural District of Behshahr county, and had a population of 740 people in 124 households. During that time the village had power and water infrastructure, mosque, flour mill and elementary school.[ p. 71]

At the 1986 census, Kelak's population increased to 972 people in 187 households, of which 506 were educated. The village's agriculture included farming, gardening, fish farming and livestock.

Kelak was annexed to Khalil Shahr city during its establishment in 2005.
