= Abbasabad, Behshahr =

Village in Mazandaran province, Iran

Abbasabad Persian: عباس اباد
- Village
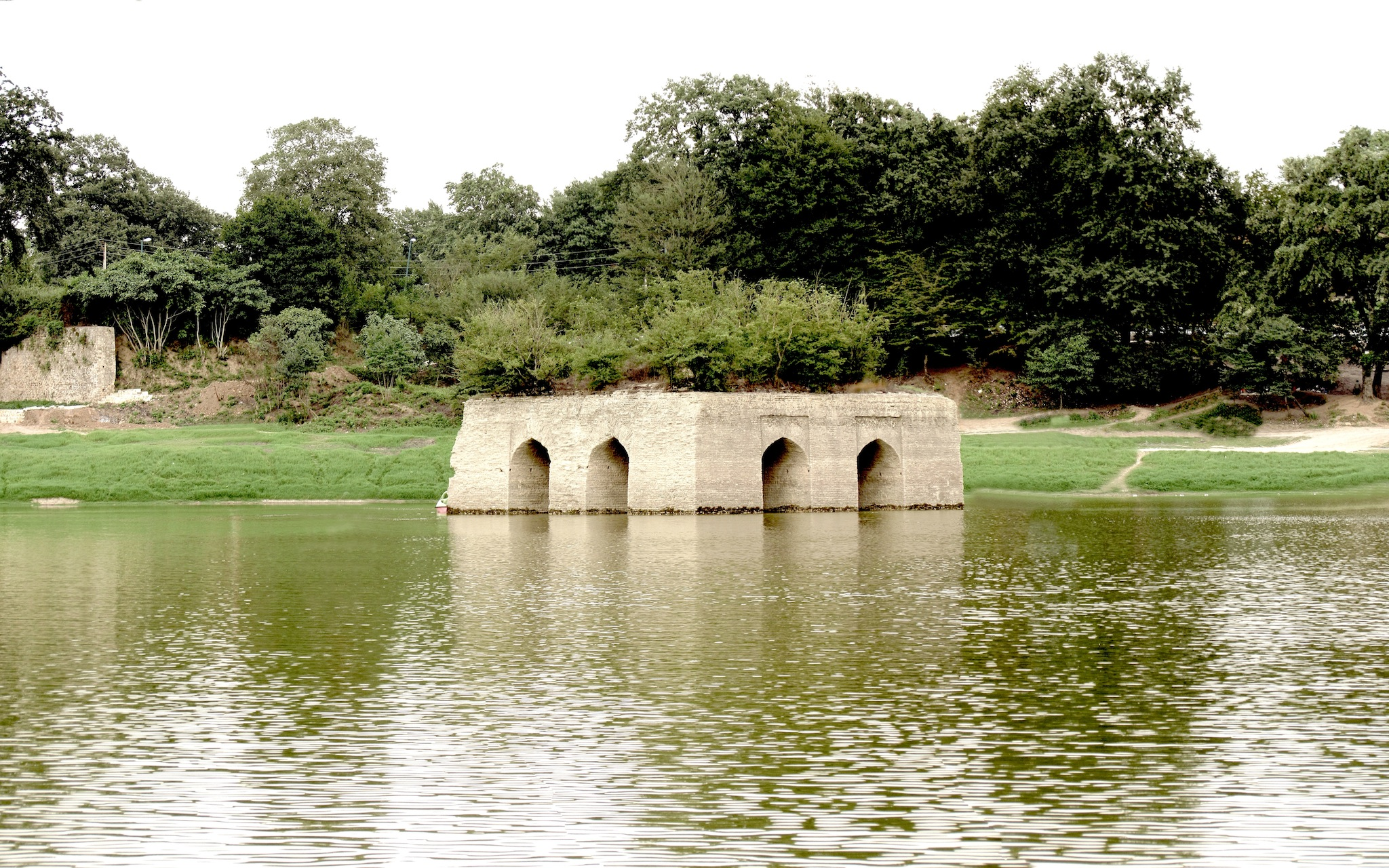
- The lake in the village of Abbasabad

- Location within Iran
- Coordinates: 36°39′50″N 53°35′47″E
- Country: Iran
- Province: Mazandaran
- County: Behshahr
- District: Central
- Rural District: Kuhestan

Population (2016)
  - Total: 0
- Time zone: UTC+3:30 (IRST)

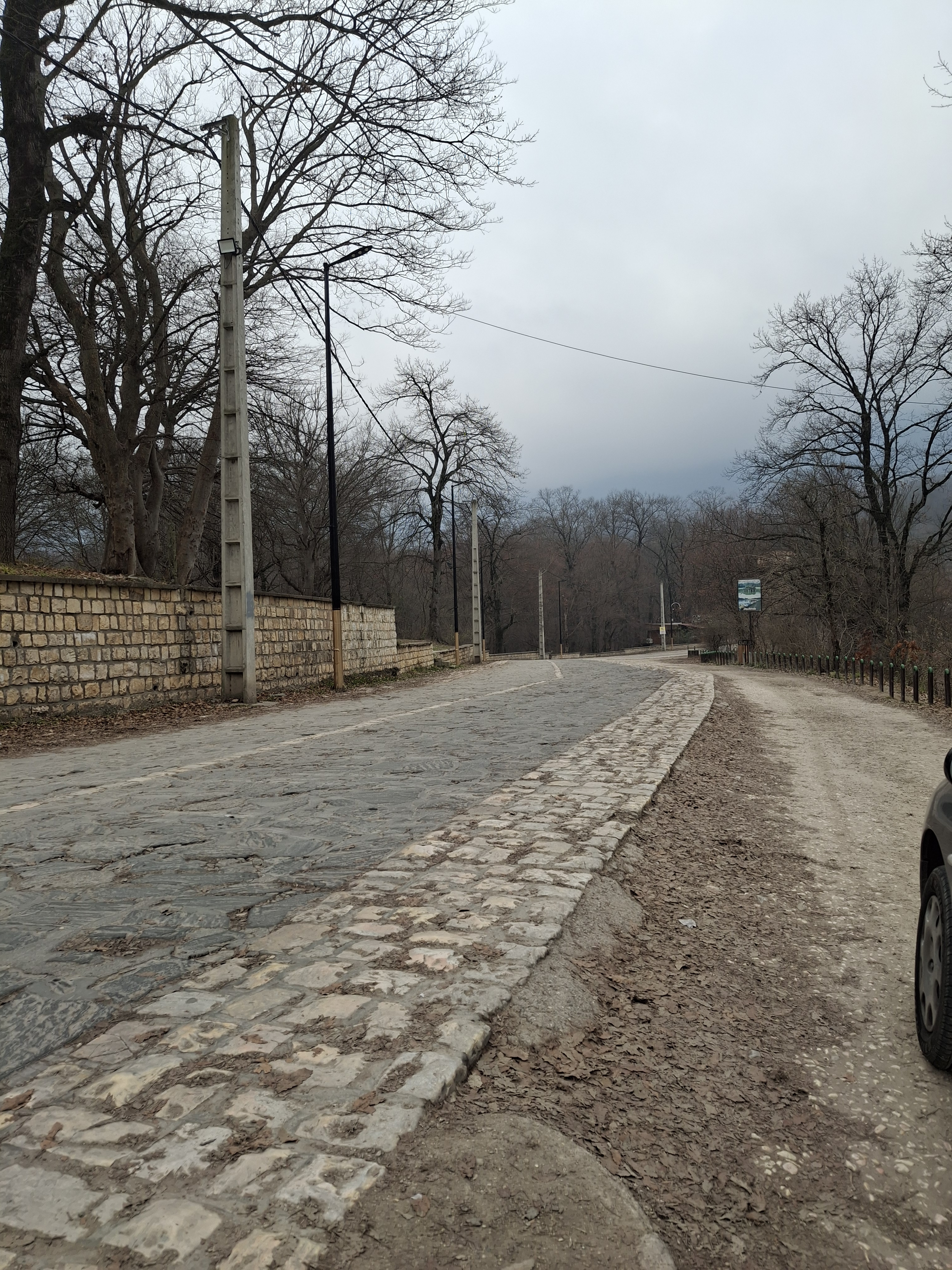
The historical complex in Abbasabad

Abbasabad (Persian: عباس‌آباد) (Note: Also romanized as ‘Abbāsābād) is a village in Kuhestan Rural District of the Central District in Behshahr County, Mazandaran province, Iran.

The Abbasabad historical complex is located in this village, and has road connection to Behshahr and the village of Al Tappeh.

== Demographics ==
=== Population ===
At the time of the 2006 National Census, the village's population was 11 in seven households. The village did not appear in the following census of 2011. The 2016 census measured the population of the village as zero.
