= Namak Chal =

Village in Mazandaran province, Iran

Namak Chal Persian: نمك چال
- Village
- Location within Iran
- Coordinates: 36°50′01″N 53°22′25″E
- Country: Iran
- Province: Mazandaran
- County: Behshahr
- District: Central
- Rural District: Miyan Kaleh

Population (2016)
  - Total: 703
- Time zone: UTC+3:30 (IRST)

Namak Chal (Persian: نمك چال) (Note: Also romanized as Namak Chal) is a village in Miyan Kaleh Rural District of the Central District in Behshahr County, Mazandaran province, Iran.

== Demographics ==
=== Population ===
At the time of the 2006 National Census, the village's population was 547 in 120 households. The following census in 2011 counted 377 people in 107 households. The 2016 census measured the population of the village as 703 people in 199 households.
