= Shirdari =

Village in Mazandaran province, Iran

Shirdari Persian: شیرداری
- Village
- Location within Iran
- Coordinates: 36°35′01″N 53°39′00″E
- Country: Iran
- Province: Mazandaran
- County: Behshahr
- District: Central
- Rural District: Panj Hezareh

Population (2016)
  - Total: 156
- Time zone: UTC+3:30 (IRST)

Shirdari (Persian: شیرداری) (Note: Also romanized as Shīrdārī) is a village in Panj Hezareh Rural District of the Central District in Behshahr County, Mazandaran province, Iran.

== Demographics ==
=== Population ===
At the time of the 2006 National Census, the village's population was 78 in 17 households. The following census in 2011 counted 60 people in 18 households. The 2016 census measured the population of the village as 156 people in 50 households.
