= Kenet =

Kenet may refer to:

- Kenet, Mazandaran, village in Kuhestan Rural District, Central District of Behshahr County, Mazandaran Province, Iran
- Kenet Works, Swedish company acquired by Yahoo
- KENET, Kenya Education Network
