= Galesh Mahalleh =

Galesh Mahalleh (Persian: گالش محله) may refer to:

- Galesh Mahalleh, Gilan
- Galesh Mahalleh, Behshahr, Mazandaran Province
- Galesh Mahalleh, Ramsar, Mazandaran Province
