= Mehdi Younesi Rostami =

Iranian politician and physician (b. 1962)

- مهدی یونسی رستمی
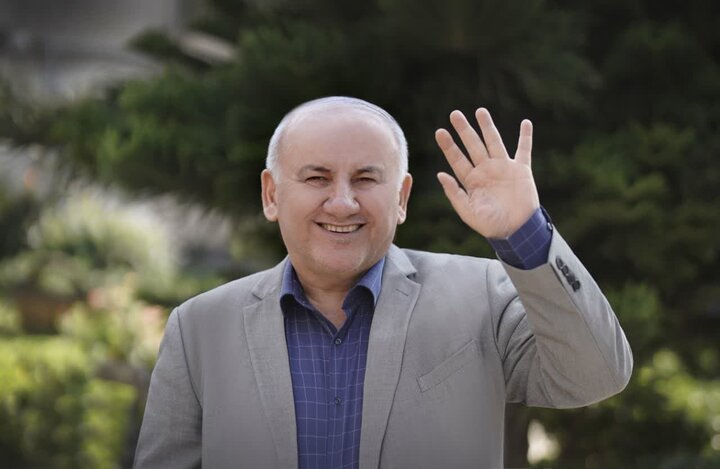

Governor General of Mazandaran
- Incumbent
- Assumed office 24 November 2024
- President: Masoud Pezeshkian
- Preceded by: Yousef Nouri

Personal details
- Born: 1962 (age 63–64) Rostamkola, Behshahr County, Mazandaran Province, Pahlavi Iran
- Party: Reformist
- Occupation: Politician, Physician, Executive manager

Mehdi Younesi Rostami (Persian: مهدی یونسی رستمی; born 1962 in Rostamkola) is a reformist physician and politician who has served as the governor of Mazandaran Province since November 2024.

A veteran of the Iran–Iraq War, he is regarded as a prominent reformist figure in northern Iran and previously headed the provincial campaign for Masoud Pezeshkian. In August 2025, Younesi Rostami drew national attention for his outspoken criticism of government policies and the Hijab and Chastity Bill.

== Education ==
Younesi Rostami is a specialist in urology, with a fellowship in kidney surgery, urinary tract surgery, and endourology. He is also a member of the academic staff at Mazandaran University of Medical Sciences.

== Career ==
Before becoming president of Mazandaran University of Medical Sciences for a four-year term, he held various positions including Vice President for Education, member of the Education Council, member of the Research Council, head of faculty recruitment, head of security, and advisor to the university president.

He has also held positions such as personnel and selection officer in several national security institutions, was a member of the command council of Sayyed al-Shohada Headquarters, and a member of Ramadan Headquarters. His achievements in the health sector include establishing the largest educational complex in northern Iran, deploying two helicopters for the first time in the province for emergency medical services, building the region's burn hospital, and launching the first magnetic resonance imaging (MRI) center in northern Iran.

Younesi Rostami is also a veteran of the Iran–Iraq War, where he served for 43 months and was wounded in action. He is considered a prominent reformist figure in Mazandaran Province and was the head of Masoud Pezeshkian’s election campaign in the province.

In August 2025, during a speech on Journalists’ Day, Younesi Rostami delivered a critical address regarding the country's governance that drew widespread attention. He stated: "As long as people are hungry, I do not believe in chastity and hijab."
