= Qarah Tappeh, Mazandaran =

Village in Mazandaran province, Iran

Qarah Tappeh Persian: قره‌تپه
- Village
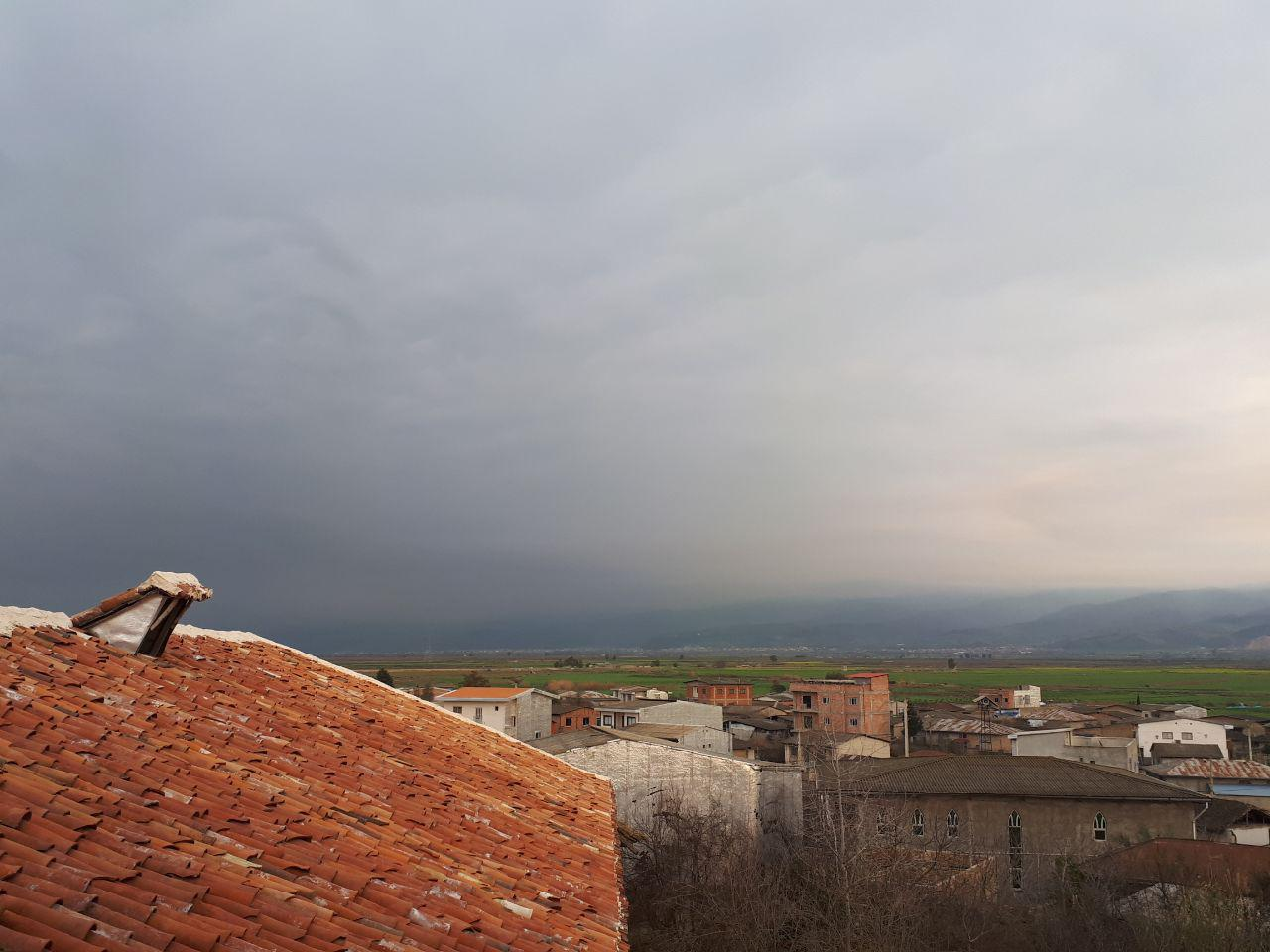
- The village of Qarah Tappeh

- Location within Iran
- Coordinates: 36°44′15″N 53°26′04″E
- Country: Iran
- Province: Mazandaran
- County: Behshahr
- District: Central
- Rural District: Miyan Kaleh

Population (2016)
  - Total: 1,775
- Time zone: UTC+3:30 (IRST)

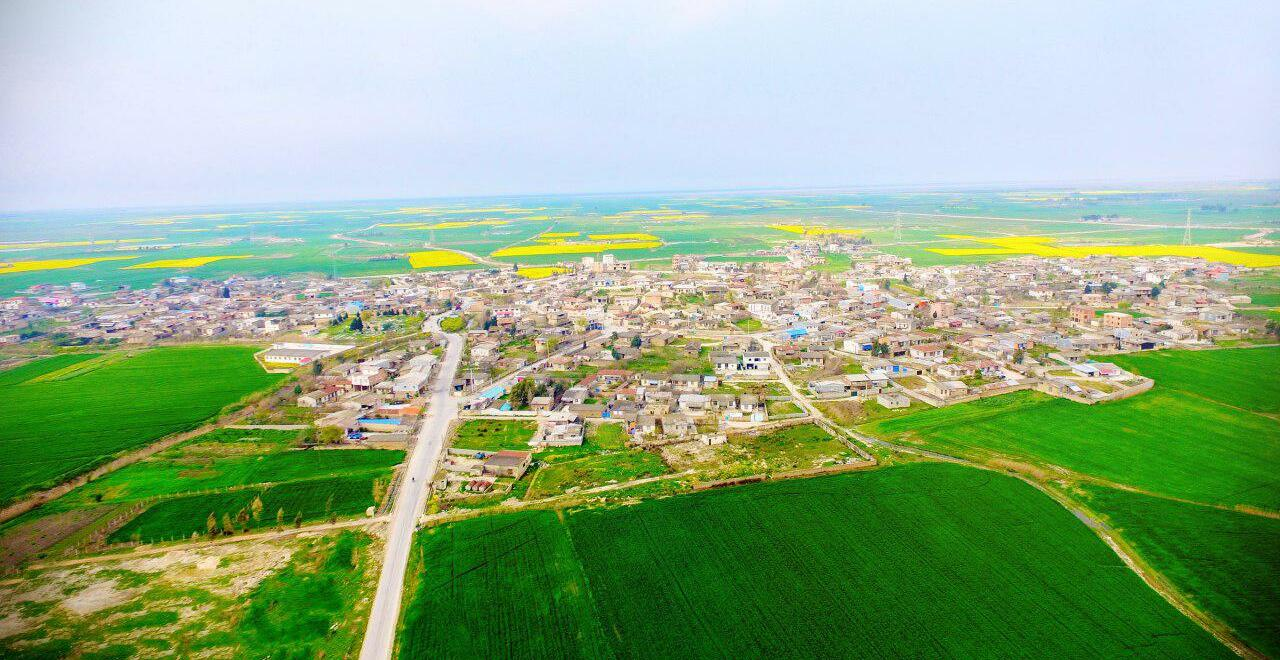
Aerial view of the village of Qarah Tappeh

Qarah Tappeh (Persian: قره‌تپه) (Note: Also romanized as Qareh Tappeh; also known as Qaratepe) is a village in Miyan Kaleh Rural District of the Central District in Behshahr County, Mazandaran province, Iran.

The majority of the village's people are farmers, and given the soil and water conditions of the region, crops such as cotton, wheat, barley, rapeseed, sunflowers, watermelons, and melons are grown. In addition to farming, some people are also engaged in animal husbandry.

== Demographics ==
=== Religion ===
People of the village are Muslims from Shia and Sunni branches.

=== Population ===
At the time of the 2006 National Census, the village's population was 1,884 in 504 households. The following census in 2011 counted 1,906 people in 579 households. The 2016 census measured the population of the village as 1,775 people in 596 households.

== Geography ==
Qarah Tappeh is located 13 km (8.1 miles) northwest of the city of Behshahr, on a road that connects the city to the Caspian Sea.
