= Kuhestan, Mazandaran =

Village in Mazandaran province, Iran

Kuhestan Persian: كوهستان
- Village
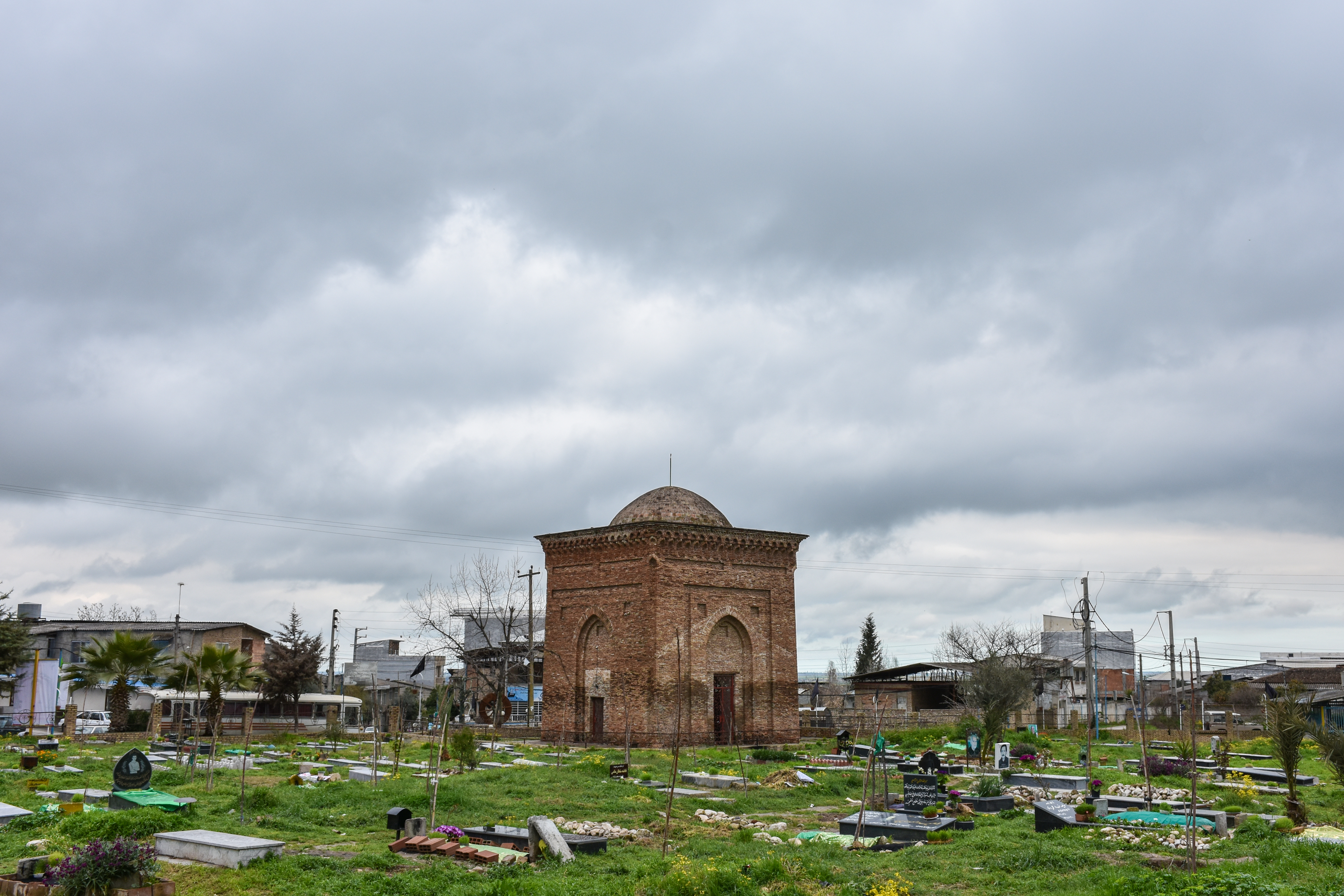
- Tomb of Amir Seyyed Kamal ol Din in the village of Kuhestan

- Location within Iran
- Coordinates: 36°40′46″N 53°27′57″E
- Country: Iran
- Province: Mazandaran
- County: Behshahr
- District: Central
- Rural District: Kuhestan

Population (2016)
  - Total: 1,659
- Time zone: UTC+3:30 (IRST)

Kuhestan (Persian: كوهستان) (Note: Also romanized as Kūhestān) is a village in, and the capital of, Kuhestan Rural District in the Central District of Behshahr County, Mazandaran province, Iran.

== Demographics ==
=== Population ===
At the time of the 2006 National Census, the village's population was 1,691 in 445 households. The following census in 2011 counted 1,672 people in 499 households. The 2016 census measured the population of the village as 1,659 people in 585 households.
