= Amirabad, Behshahr =

Village in Mazandaran province, Iran

Amirabad Persian: اميراباد
- Village
- Location within Iran
- Coordinates: 36°47′33″N 53°20′57″E
- Country: Iran
- Province: Mazandaran
- County: Behshahr
- District: Central
- Rural District: Miyan Kaleh
- Elevation: −20 m (−66 ft)

Population (2016)
  - Total: 2,222
- Time zone: UTC+3:30 (IRST)

Amirabad (Persian: اميراباد) (Note: Also romanized as Amīrābād) is a village in Miyan Kaleh Rural District of the Central District in Behshahr County, Mazandaran province, Iran.

The people of Amirabad speak Mazandarani and are employed in farming, gardening, and animal husbandry. Agricultural products include wheat, rice, barley, citrus fruits, vegetable crops, cotton and animal products.

== Demographics ==
=== Population ===
At the time of the 2006 National Census, the village's population was 2,131 in 562 households. The following census in 2011 counted 2,141 people in 662 households. The 2016 census measured the population of the village as 2,222 people in 744 households.
