= Chalek Deh =

Village in Mazandaran province, Iran

Chalek Deh Persian: چالكده
- Village
- Location within Iran
- Coordinates: 36°34′29″N 53°39′24″E
- Country: Iran
- Province: Mazandaran
- County: Behshahr
- District: Central
- Rural District: Panj Hezareh

Population (2016)
  - Total: 112
- Time zone: UTC+3:30 (IRST)

Chalek Deh (Persian: چالكده) (Note: Also romanized as Chālek Deh) is a village in Panj Hezareh Rural District of the Central District in Behshahr County, Mazandaran province, Iran.

== Demographics ==
=== Population ===
At the time of the 2006 National Census, the village's population was 82 in 22 households. The following census in 2011 counted 42 people in 15 households. The 2016 census measured the population of the village as 112 people in 37 households.
