= Gorji Mahalleh, Mazandaran =

Village in Mazandaran province, Iran

Gorji Mahalleh Persian: گرجي محله
- Village
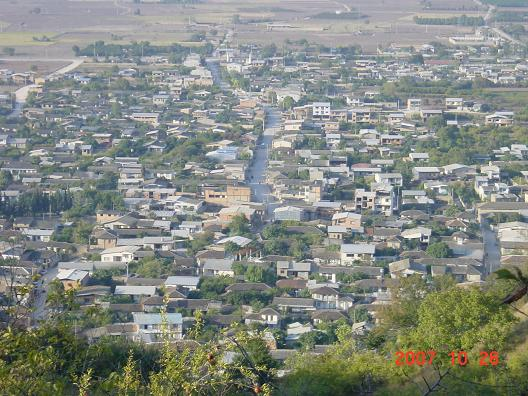
- The village of Gorji Mahalleh

- Location within Iran
- Coordinates: 36°40′43″N 53°26′34″E
- Country: Iran
- Province: Mazandaran
- County: Behshahr
- District: Central
- Rural District: Kuhestan

Population (2016)
  - Total: 6,129
- Time zone: UTC+3:30 (IRST)

Gorji Mahalleh (Persian: گرجي محله) (Note: Also romanized as Gorjī Maḩalleh, English: Georgian Quarter) is a village in Kuhestan Rural District of the Central District in Behshahr County, Mazandaran province, Iran.

== Demographics ==
=== Population ===
At the time of the 2006 National Census, the village's population was 5,953 in 1,553 households. The following census in 2011 counted 5,796 people in 1,747 households. The 2016 census measured the population of the village as 6,129 people in 2,014 households. It was the most populous village in its rural district.

The residents of this village are originally from Georgia after Shah Abbas I obliged several of their ancestors to migrate here as defenders against Ottomans and Russians. Gorji means Georgian in Persian pronunciation and Gorji Mahalleh means the quarter or neighborhood where Georgian people live.
