= Rudbar Yakhkesh =

Village in Mazandaran province, Iran

Rudbar Yakhkesh Persian: رودباريخ كش
- Village
- Location within Iran
- Coordinates: 36°35′47″N 53°37′31″E
- Country: Iran
- Province: Mazandaran
- County: Behshahr
- District: Central
- Rural District: Panj Hezareh

Population (2016)
  - Total: 168
- Time zone: UTC+3:30 (IRST)

Rudbar Yakhkesh (Persian: رودباريخ كش) (Note: Also romanized as Rūdbār Yakhkesh; also known as Rūdbār) is a village in Panj Hezareh Rural District of the Central District in Behshahr County, Mazandaran province, Iran.

== Demographics ==
=== Population ===
At the time of the 2006 National Census, the village's population was 158 in 32 households. The following census in 2011 counted 110 people in 31 households. The 2016 census measured the population of the village as 168 people in 54 households.
