= Mehdiabad, Behshahr =

Village in Mazandaran province, Iran

Mehdiabad Persian: مهدی آباد
- Village
- Location within Iran
- Coordinates: 36°48′19″N 53°19′48″E
- Country: Iran
- Province: Mazandaran
- County: Behshahr
- District: Central
- Rural District: Miyan Kaleh

Population (2016)
  - Total: 116
- Time zone: UTC+3:30 (IRST)

Mehdiabad (Persian: مهدی آباد) (Note: Also romanized as Mehdīābād) is a village in Miyan Kaleh Rural District of the Central District in Behshahr County, Mazandaran province, Iran.

== Demographics ==
=== Population ===
At the time of the 2006 National Census, the village's population was 178 in 57 households. The following census in 2011 counted 154 people in 52 households. The 2016 census measured the population of the village as 116 people in 40 households.
