= Yekkeh Tut =

Yekkeh Tut or Yekeh Tut (Persian: يكه توت) may refer to:

- Yekkeh Tut, Golestan
- Yekeh Tut, Mazandaran
- Yekkeh Tut, Razavi Khorasan
