= Asgarabad, Mazandaran =

Village in Mazandaran province, Iran

Asgarabad Persian: عسگرآباد
- Village
- Location within Iran
- Coordinates: 36°45′48″N 53°19′59″E
- Country: Iran
- Province: Mazandaran
- County: Behshahr
- District: Central
- Rural District: Miyan Kaleh

Population (2016)
  - Total: 489
- Time zone: UTC+3:30 (IRST)

Asgarabad (Persian: عسگرآباد) (Note: Also romanized as ‘Asgarābād) is a village in Miyan Kaleh Rural District of the Central District in Behshahr County, Mazandaran province, Iran.

== Demographics ==
=== Population ===
At the time of the 2006 National Census, the village's population was 537 in 134 households. The following census in 2011 counted 465 people in 139 households. The 2016 census measured the population of the village as 489 people in 174 households.
