= Mohammadabad, Behshahr =

Village in Mazandaran province, Iran

Mohammadabad Persian: محمدآباد
- Village
- Location within Iran
- Coordinates: 36°36′07″N 53°36′01″E
- Country: Iran
- Province: Mazandaran
- County: Behshahr
- District: Central
- Rural District: Panj Hezareh
- Elevation: 850 m (2,790 ft)

Population (2016)
  - Total: 591
- Time zone: UTC+3:30 (IRST)

Mohammadabad (Persian: محمد آباد) (Note: Also romanized as Moḩammadābād) is a village in Panj Hezareh Rural District of the Central District in Behshahr County, Mazandaran province, Iran.

The local economy is primarily based on agriculture and animal husbandry. Major products include wheat, barley, millet, and various animal products.

== Demographics ==
=== Population ===
At the time of the 2006 National Census, the village's population was 520 in 114 households. The following census in 2011 counted 575 people in 158 households. The 2016 census measured the population of the village as 591 people in 194 households.
