= Allah Marz, Behshahr =

Village in Mazandaran province, Iran

Allah Marz Persian: لله مرز
- Village
- Location within Iran
- Coordinates: 36°45′14″N 53°23′28″E
- Country: Iran
- Province: Mazandaran
- County: Behshahr
- District: Central
- Rural District: Miyan Kaleh

Population (2016)
  - Total: 484
- Time zone: UTC+3:30 (IRST)

Allah Marz (Persian: لله مرز) (Note: Also known as Laleh Marz) is a village in Miyan Kaleh Rural District of the Central District in Behshahr County, Mazandaran province, Iran. Allah Marz borders the village of Hoseynabad to its south.

== Demographics ==
=== Population ===
At the time of the 2006 National Census, the village's population was 516 in 141 households. The following census in 2011 counted 513 people in 156 households. The 2016 census measured the population of the village as 484 people in 160 households.
