= Allah Marz =

Allah Marz or Laleh Marz (Persian: لله مرز) may refer to:

- Allah Marz, Behshahr
- Allah Marz, Sari
