= Yaqub Lengeh =

Village in Mazandaran province, Iran

Yaqub Lengeh Persian: يعقوب لنگه
- Village
- Location within Iran
- Coordinates: 36°50′30″N 53°20′57″E
- Country: Iran
- Province: Mazandaran
- County: Behshahr
- District: Central
- Rural District: Miyan Kaleh

Population (2016)
  - Total: 1,246
- Time zone: UTC+3:30 (IRST)

Yaqub Lengeh (Persian: يعقوب لنگه) (Note: Also romanized as Ya‘qūb Lengeh) is a village in Miyan Kaleh Rural District of the Central District in Behshahr County, Mazandaran province, Iran.

== Demographics ==
=== Population ===
At the time of the 2006 National Census, the village's population was 999 in 246 households. The following census in 2011 counted 1,033 people in 292 households. The 2016 census measured the population of the village as 1,246 people in 357 households.
