= Shahidabad, Behshahr =

Village in Mazandaran province, Iran

Shahidabad Persian: شهيداباد
- Village
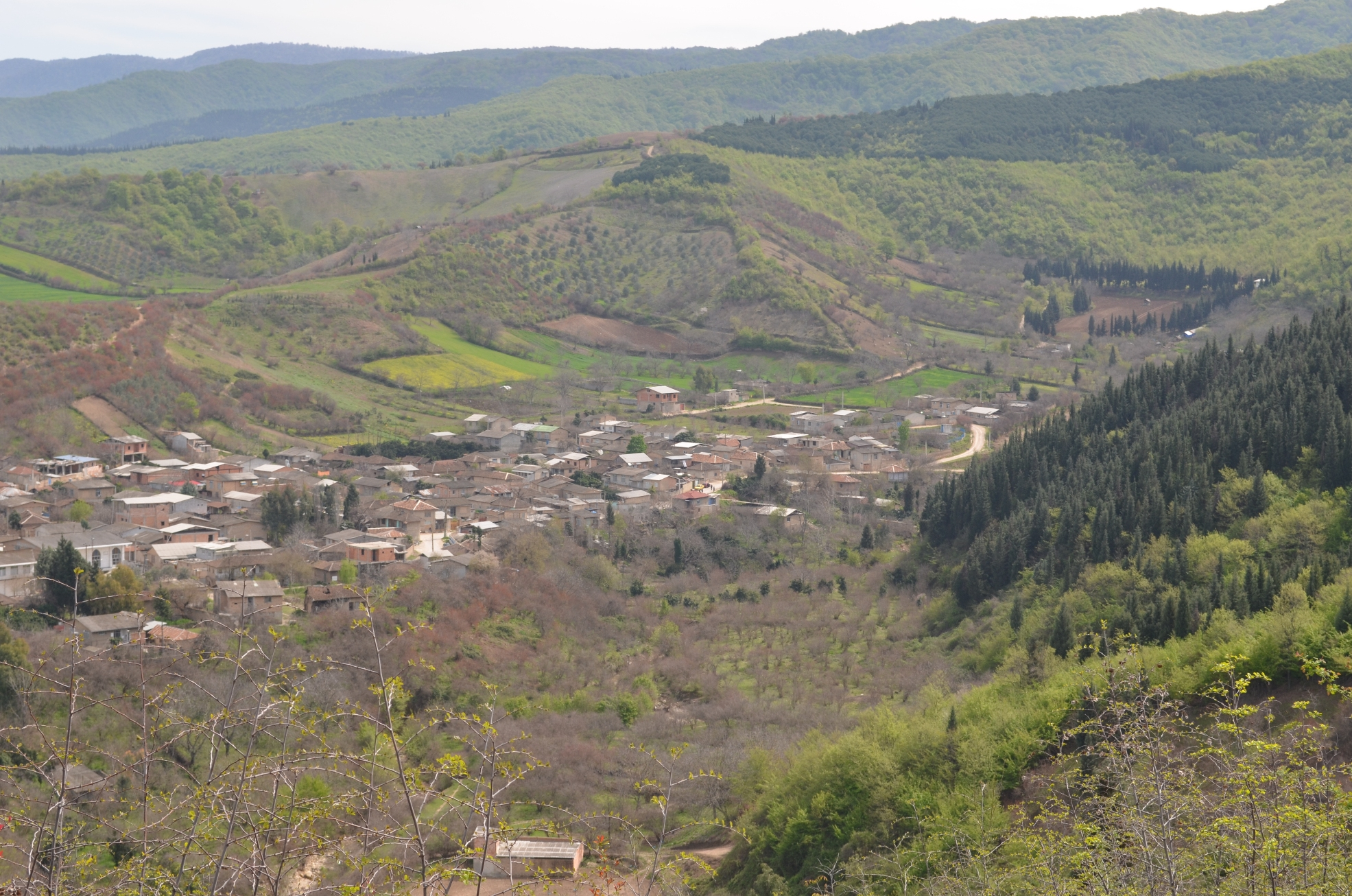
- The village of Shahidabad

- Location within Iran
- Coordinates: 36°41′12″N 53°29′27″E
- Country: Iran
- Province: Mazandaran
- County: Behshahr
- District: Central
- Rural District: Kuhestan

Population (2016)
  - Total: 4,113
- Time zone: UTC+3:30 (IRST)

Shahidabad (Persian: شهيدآباد) (Note: Also romanized as Shahīdābād; also known as Toroujen (تروجن), also romanized as Torujen) is a village in Kuhestan Rural District of the Central District in Behshahr County, Mazandaran province, Iran.

Shahidabad is at the western limit of the city Behshahr in the northern foothills of the Alborz, with Road 22 passing through the northern part of the village. The Hotu and Kamarband Caves are located in this village.

== Demographics ==
=== Population ===
At the time of the 2006 National Census, the village's population was 4,086 in 1,003 households. The following census in 2011 counted 3,983 people in 1,194 households. The 2016 census measured the population of the village as 4,113 people in 1,336 households.
