= Asiab Sar, Behshahr =

Village in Mazandaran province, Iran

Asiab Sar Persian: آسياب سر
- Village
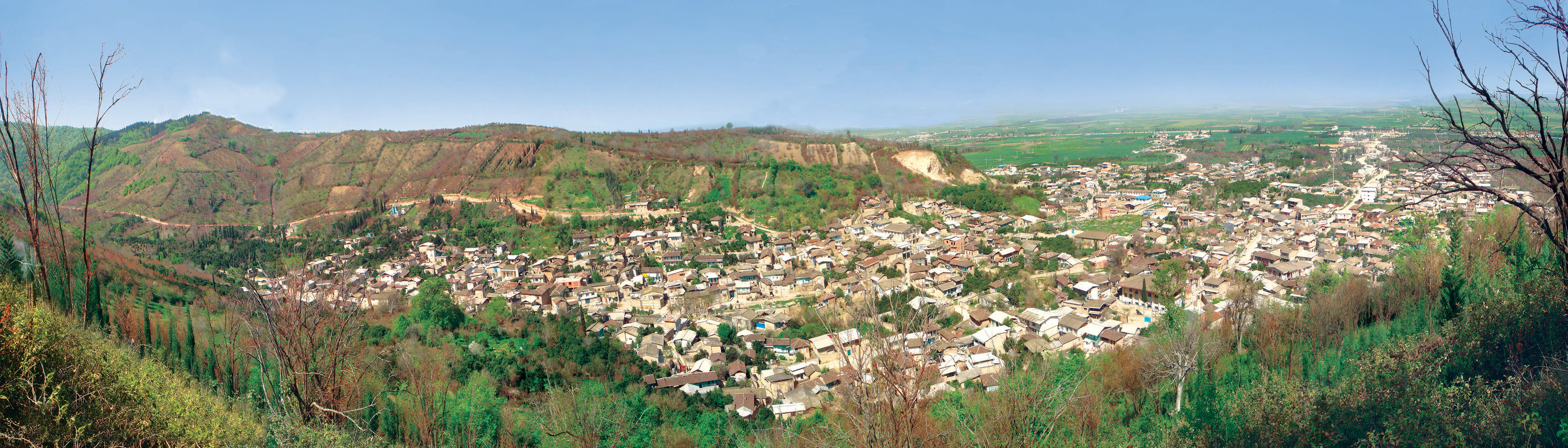
- The village of Asiab Sar

- Location within Iran
- Coordinates: 36.68°N 53.463°E
- Country: Iran
- Province: Mazandaran
- County: Behshahr
- District: Central
- Rural District: Kuhestan

Population (2016)
  - Total: 1,526
- Time zone: UTC+3:30 (IRST)

Asiab Sar (Persian: آسياب سر) (Note: Also romanized as Āsīāb Sar) also known as Āsyo Sar in Mazanderani language (آسيو سر) is a village in Kuhestan Rural District of the Central District in Behshahr County, Mazandaran province, Iran.

== Demographics ==
=== Population ===
At the time of the 2006 National Census, the village's population was 1,598 in 427 households. The following census in 2011 counted 1,537 people in 499 households. The 2016 census measured the population of the village as 1,526 people in 555 households.

== Overview ==
The main activities of the villagers are farming, gardening, and animal husbandry. The main agricultural products are wheat, rice, citrus fruits, sunflowers, soybeans, pomegranates, and cotton.
