= Galesh Mahalleh, Behshahr =

Village in Mazandaran province, Iran

Galesh Mahalleh Persian: گالش محله
- Village
- Location within Iran
- Coordinates: 36°33′54″N 53°41′31″E
- Country: Iran
- Province: Mazandaran
- County: Behshahr
- District: Central
- Rural District: Panj Hezareh

Population (2016)
  - Total: 131
- Time zone: UTC+3:30 (IRST)

Galesh Mahalleh (Persian: گالش محله) (Note: Also romanized as Gālesh Maḩalleh and Galesh Maḩalleh) is a village in Panj Hezareh Rural District of the Central District in Behshahr County, Mazandaran province, Iran.

== Demographics ==
=== Population ===
At the time of the 2006 National Census, the village's population was 77 in 18 households. The following census in 2011 counted 50 people in 19 households. The 2016 census measured the population of the village as 131 people in 47 households.
