= Miyan Kaleh Rural District =

Rural district in Mazandaran province, Iran

Miyan Kaleh Rural District Persian: دهستان ميان كاله
- Rural District
- Location within Iran
- Coordinates: 36°47′N 53°27′E
- Country: Iran
- Province: Mazandaran
- County: Behshahr
- District: Central
- Established: 1987
- Capital: Zagh Marz

Population (2016)
  - Total: 18,469
- Time zone: UTC+3:30 (IRST)

Miyan Kaleh Rural District (Persian: دهستان ميان كاله) is in the Central District of Behshahr County, Mazandaran province, Iran. Its capital is the village of Zagh Marz.

== Demographics ==
=== Population ===
At the time of the 2006 National Census, the rural district's population was 18,320 in 4,737 households. There were 17,355 inhabitants in 5,197 households at the following census of 2011. The 2016 census measured the population of the rural district as 18,469 in 6,026 households. The most populous of its 69 villages was Zagh Marz, with 5,932 people.

=== Other villages in the rural district ===
- Allah Marz
- Amirabad
- Asgarabad
- Hoseynabad
- Mehdiabad
- Namak Chal
- Qarah Tappeh
- Yaqub Lengeh
- Yekeh Tut
- Zinevand
