= Kuhestan Rural District (Behshahr County) =

Rural district in Mazandaran province, Iran

Kuhestan Rural District Persian: دهستان كوهستان
- Rural District
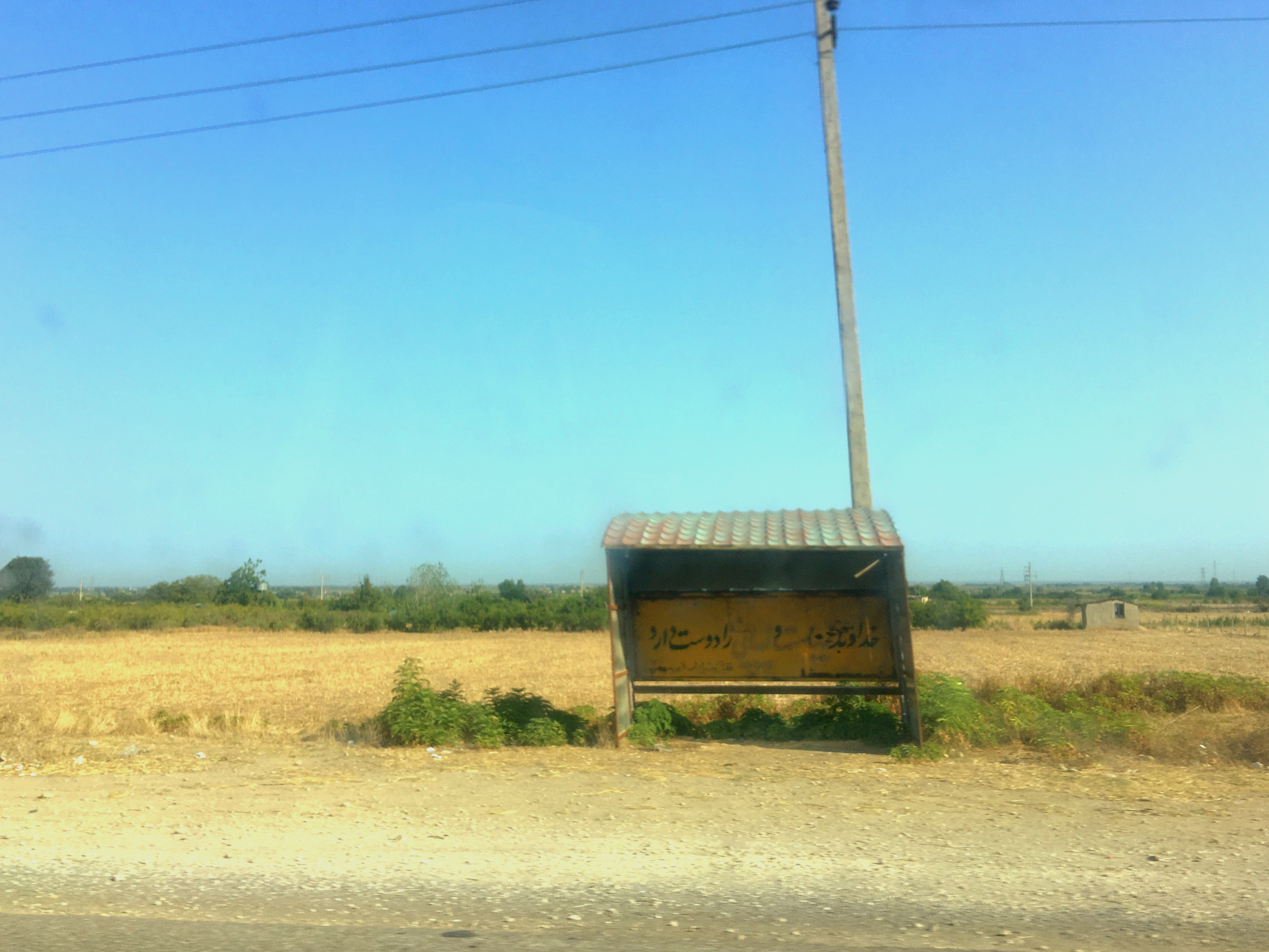
- Rural landscape near the village of Kuhestan

- Location within Iran
- Coordinates: 36°42′N 53°30′E
- Country: Iran
- Province: Mazandaran
- County: Behshahr
- District: Central
- Established: 1987
- Capital: Kuhestan

Population (2016)
  - Total: 17,436
- Time zone: UTC+3:30 (IRST)

Kuhestan Rural District (Persian: دهستان كوهستان) is in the Central District of Behshahr County, Mazandaran province, Iran. Its capital is the village of Kuhestan.

== Demographics ==
=== Population ===
At the time of the 2006 National Census, the rural district's population was 17,420 in 4,453 households. There were 16,680 inhabitants in 4,957 households at the following census of 2011. The 2016 census measured the population of the rural district as 17,436 in 5,748 households. The most populous of its 10 villages was Gorji Mahalleh, with 6,129 people.

The rural district consists of eight populated villages, in addition to the touristic village of Abbasabad and Behshahr's industrial town.

=== Other villages in the rural district ===
- Abbasabad
- Al Tappeh
- Asiab Sar
- Emamdeh
- Kenet
- Saru
- Shahidabad
