= Gharib Mahalleh, Mazandaran =

Village in Mazandaran province, Iran

Gharib Mahalleh Persian: غريب محله
- Village
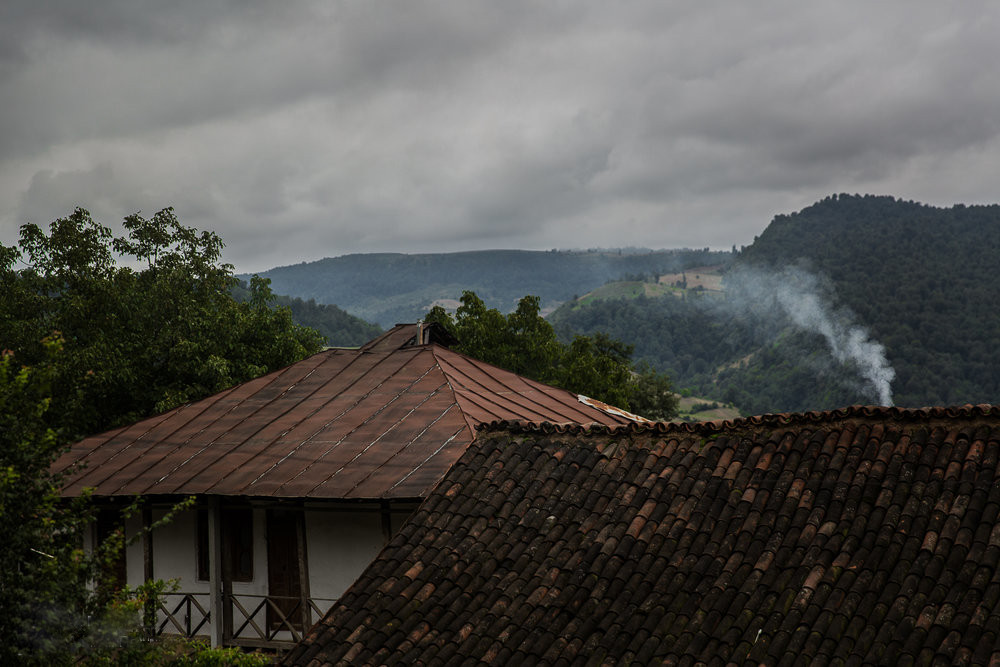
- The village of Gharib Mahalleh

- Location within Iran
- Coordinates: 36°34′18″N 53°40′28″E
- Country: Iran
- Province: Mazandaran
- County: Behshahr
- District: Central
- Rural District: Panj Hezareh

Population (2016)
  - Total: 405
- Time zone: UTC+3:30 (IRST)

Gharib Mahalleh (Persian: غريب محله) (Note: Also romanized as Gharīb Maḩalleh) is a village in Panj Hezareh Rural District of the Central District in Behshahr County, Mazandaran province, Iran.

== Demographics ==
=== Population ===
At the time of the 2006 National Census, the village's population was 425 in 107 households. The following census in 2011 counted 289 people in 97 households. The 2016 census measured the population of the village as 405 people in 133 households.

== See also ==
Media related to Gharib Mahalleh, Mazandaran at Wikimedia Commons
