= Hoseynabad, Behshahr =

Village in Mazandaran province, Iran

Hoseynabad Persian: حسين آباد
- Village
- Location within Iran
- Coordinates: 36°44′51″N 53°23′01″E
- Country: Iran
- Province: Mazandaran
- County: Behshahr
- District: Central
- Rural District: Miyan Kaleh

Population (2016)
  - Total: 2,353
- Time zone: UTC+3:30 (IRST)

Hoseynabad (Persian: حسين اباد) (Note: Also romanized as Ḩoseynābād, Hosseinabad, and Ḩosseinābād) is a village in Miyan Kaleh Rural District of the Central District in Behshahr County, Mazandaran province, Iran.

== Demographics ==
=== Population ===
At the time of the 2006 National Census, the village's population was 2,661 in 692 households. The following census in 2011 counted 2,532 people in 773 households. The 2016 census measured the population of the village as 2,353 people in 816 households.
