= Pasand =

Village in Mazandaran province, Iran

Pasand Persian: پاسند
- Village
- Location within Iran
- Coordinates: 36°41′32″N 53°36′53″E
- Country: Iran
- Province: Mazandaran
- County: Behshahr
- District: Central
- Rural District: Panj Hezareh

Population (2016)
  - Total: 1,721
- Time zone: UTC+3:30 (IRST)

Pasand (Persian: پاسند) (Note: Also romanized as Pāsand) is a village in Panj Hezareh Rural District of the Central District in Behshahr County, Mazandaran province, Iran.

== Demographics ==
=== Population ===
At the time of the 2006 National Census, the village's population was 1,847 in 420 households. The following census in 2011 counted 1,716 people in 461 households. The 2016 census measured the population of the village as 1,721 people in 526 households. It was the most populous village in its rural district.
