= Kenet, Mazandaran =

Village in Mazandaran province, Iran

Kenet Persian: كنت
- Village
- Location within Iran
- Coordinates: 36°35′17″N 53°32′24″E
- Country: Iran
- Province: Mazandaran
- County: Behshahr
- District: Central
- Rural District: Kuhestan

Population (2016)
  - Total: 62
- Time zone: UTC+3:30 (IRST)

Kenet (Persian: كنت) is a village in Kuhestan Rural District of the Central District in Behshahr County, Mazandaran province, Iran.

== Demographics ==
=== Population ===
At the time of the 2006 National Census, the village's population was 87 in 23 households. The following census in 2011 counted 31 people in 11 households. The 2016 census measured the population of the village as 62 people in 26 households.
