= Valam, Iran =

Village in Mazandaran province, Iran

Valam Persian: ولم
- Village
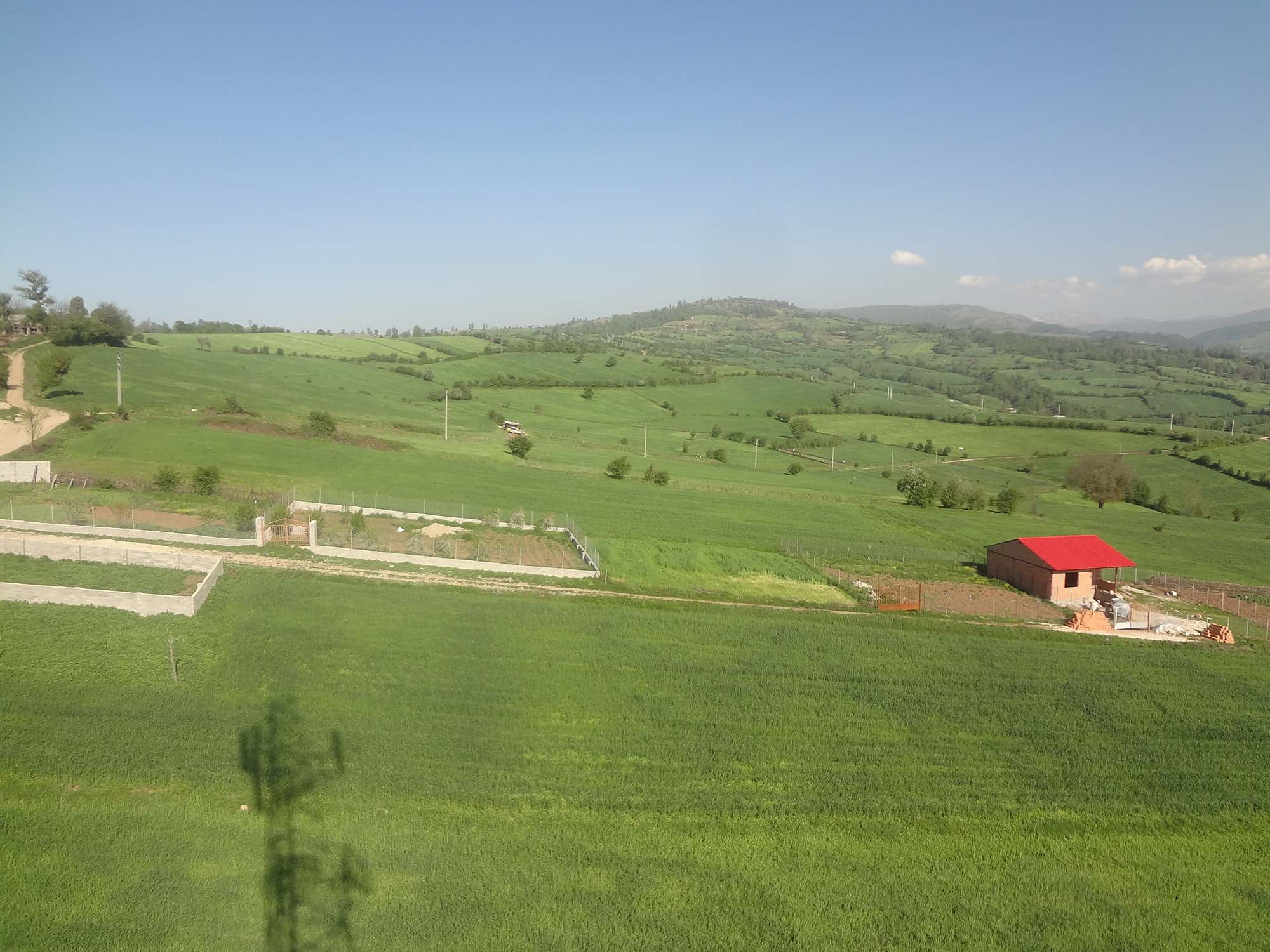
- The village of Valam

- Location within Iran
- Coordinates: 36°35′27″N 53°38′28″E
- Country: Iran
- Province: Mazandaran
- County: Behshahr
- District: Central
- Rural District: Panj Hezareh

Population (2016)
  - Total: 125
- Time zone: UTC+3:30 (IRST)

Valam (Persian: ولم) (Note: Also romanized as Welem) is a village in Panj Hezareh Rural District of the Central District in Behshahr County, Mazandaran province, Iran.

== Demographics ==
=== Population ===
At the time of the 2006 National Census, the village's population was 90 in 22 households. The following census in 2011 counted 77 people in 30 households. The 2016 census measured the population of the village as 125 people in 44 households.
