= Qarasu River =

River in northern Iran

Coordinates: 36.8286°N 54.0378°E

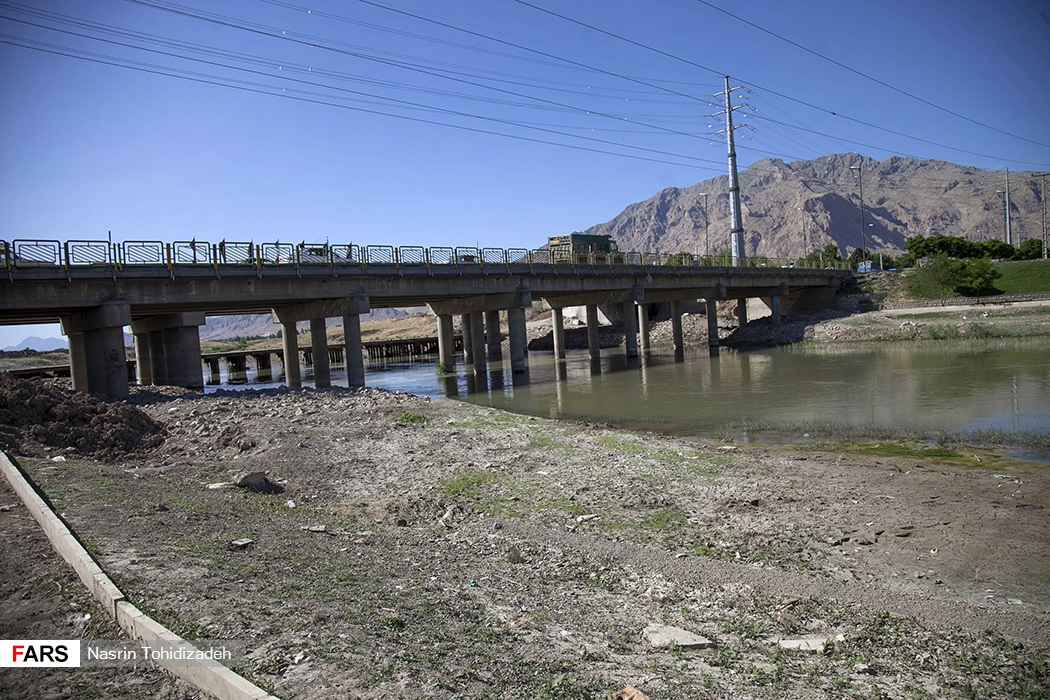
- Qarasu River in 2020

Location
- Country: Iran
- Province: Golestan province

Physical characteristics
- Mouth: Gulf of Gorgan
  - elevation: -27 m

Qarasu River (Persian: رود قره‌سو) is located in the Golestan province of Iran and flows into the Caspian Sea.
