= Ashuradeh =

Iranian island in the Caspian Sea

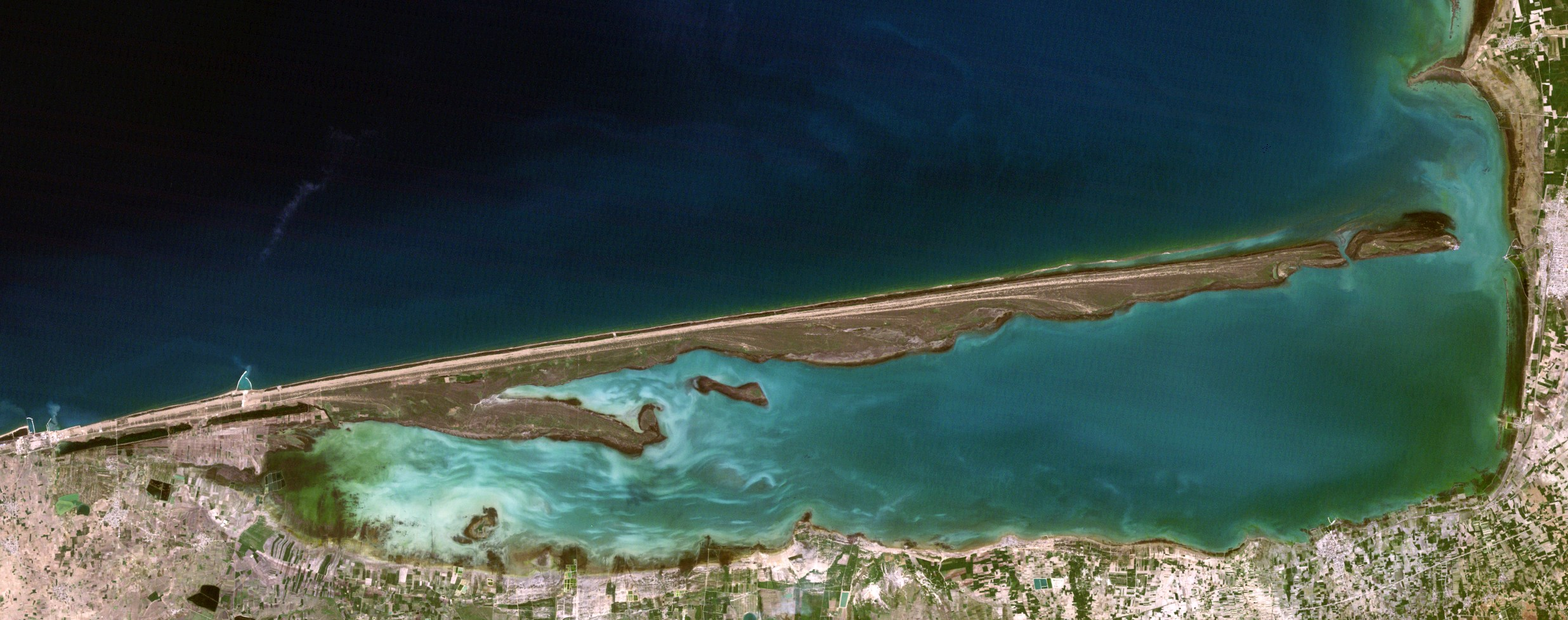
- Ashuradeh Island at the LandSat-5 satellite image (1 April 1995, Caspian Sea waters high level)

- Location within Caspian Sea
- Interactive map of Ashuradeh

Geography
- Location: Torkaman County, Golestan province, Iran
- Coordinates: 36°54′21″N 53°58′52″E

Ashūradeh (Persian: آشوراده), or Ashur Ada, besides Esmail Sai and Akaz islands, is one of the islands off the Iranian coast in the Caspian Sea (Gulf of Gorgan). Ashuradeh's surface area is 800 hectares (2,000 acres). It is located in Torkaman County, Golestan province, at the eastern end of the Miankaleh peninsula, 3 kilometers (1.9 mi) from Bandar Torkaman and 23 kilometers (14 mi) from Gorgan.

The island can be reached via Bandar Torkaman. Over 40% of Iran's caviar is produced near Ashūradeh Island.

== History ==
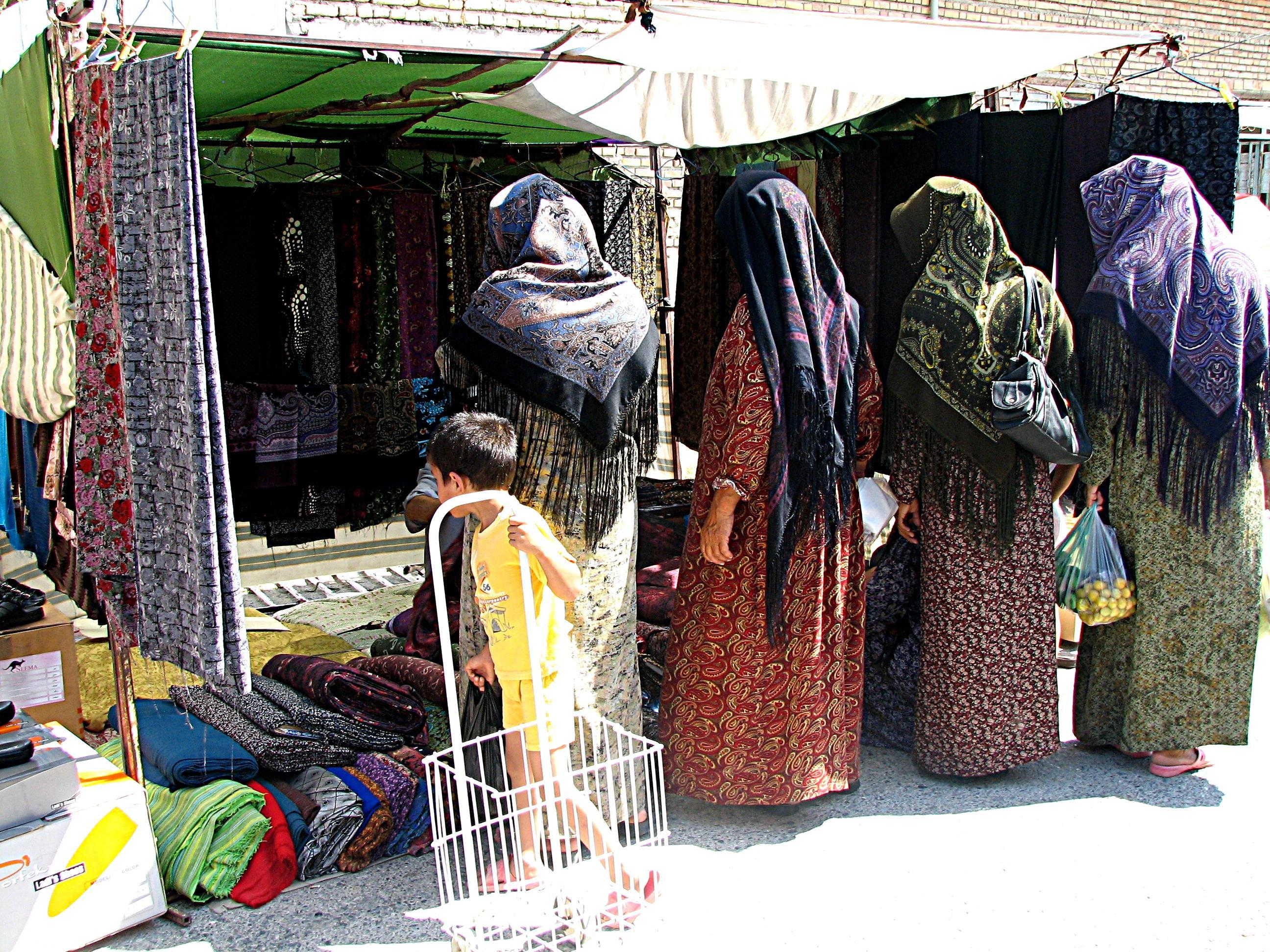
Iranian Muslim Turkmen from Ashuradeh

Ashuradeh was inhabited by 300 families, but the village is now deserted. The island was occupied by Russian forces in 1837, despite protests from Iran. Following the occupation, the Russian Army maintained a military post on the island for a few decades until 1921.
