= Yekeh Tut, Mazandaran =

Village in Mazandaran province, Iran

Yekeh Tut Persian: يكه توت
- Village
- Location within Iran
- Coordinates: 36°49′33″N 53°18′05″E
- Country: Iran
- Province: Mazandaran
- County: Behshahr
- District: Central
- Rural District: Miyan Kaleh

Population (2016)
  - Total: 1,578
- Time zone: UTC+3:30 (IRST)

Yekeh Tut (Persian: يكه توت) (Note: Also romanized as Yekeh Tūt) is a village in Miyan Kaleh Rural District of the Central District in Behshahr County, Mazandaran province, Iran.

== Demographics ==
=== Population ===
At the time of the 2006 National Census, the village's population was 1,501 in 352 households. The following census in 2011 counted 1,338 people in 377 households. The 2016 census measured the population of the village as 1,578 people in 492 households.
