= Saru, Mazandaran =

Village in Mazandaran province, Iran

Saru Persian: سارو
- Village
- Location within Iran
- Coordinates: 36°41′22″N 53°36′00″E
- Country: Iran
- Province: Mazandaran
- County: Behshahr
- District: Central
- Rural District: Kuhestan

Population (2016)
  - Total: 1,593
- Time zone: UTC+3:30 (IRST)

Saru (Persian: سارو) (Note: Also romanized as Sārū) is a village in Kuhestan Rural District of the Central District in Behshahr County, Mazandaran province, Iran.

== Demographics ==
=== Population ===
At the time of the 2006 National Census, the village's population was 1,658 in 416 households. The following census in 2011 counted 1,564 people in 427 households. The 2016 census measured the population of the village as 1,593 people in 495 households.
