= Mazandaran University of Medical Sciences =

- دانشگاه علوم پزشکی و خدمات بهداشتی درمانی مازندران; Danushgah-e 'lum-e Pezeshki-ye vâ Xedâmat-e Behedashti-ye Dârmani-ye Mazendâran
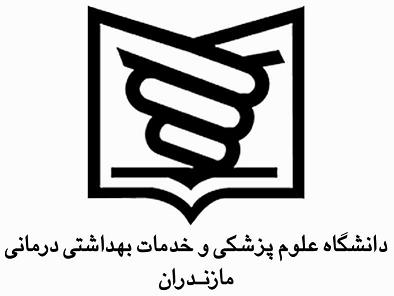
- Type: Public
- Established: 1986
- Affiliations: Ministry of Health and Medical Education
- Chancellor: Mohammad Sadegh Rezaei
- Academic staff: 460
- Students: 8,000
- Location: Mazandaran University of Medical Sciences, Valie-Asr Boulevard, Sari, Mazandaran, Iran., Sari, Mazandaran, Mazandaran, Iran
- Campus: Urban
- Language: Persian
- Website: www.mazums.ac.ir

Mazandaran University of Medical Sciences (abbreviated as MazUMS) is a medical university in Sari, Mazandaran province, Iran.

MazUMS is a type I university of medical Sciences and has more 8,000 students in different programs.

== History ==
Sari Higher School of Midwifery was established in 1975. Babol School of Medical Sciences became an independent university in 1370 and Gorgan Medical School was established in 1371. With the disintegration of Golestan province in 1997, Mazandaran University of Medical Sciences established in Sari city.

== Faculties ==
- School of Allied Medical Sciences
- School of Dentistry
- School of Health
- School of Medicine
- School of New Medical Technologies
- School of Nursing and Midwifery
- School of Pharmacy

== Training Centers ==
- Sari - Imam Khomeini
- Sari - Bu Ali Sina
- Sari - Zareh
- Sari - Fatemeh Al-Zahra
- Ghaemshahr - Razi

== Hospitals ==
- Imam Ali, Amol
- Imam Reza, Amol
- Imam Khomeini, Amol
- 17 Shahrivar, Amol
- Hazrat Zainab, Babolsar
- Imam Khomeini, Behshahr
- Khatam al-Anbiya, Behshahr
- Shohada, Behshahr
- Shahid Rajaei, Tonekabon
- Haj Azizi, Juybar
- Ayatollah Taleghani, Chalous
- Imam Sajjad, Ramsar
- Shohada, Zirab
- Imam Khomeini, Fereydunkenar
- Ghaem, Kelardasht
- Samen Al-A'emmeh, Galugah
- Shohada, Mahmudabad
- Imam Hussein, Neka
- Imam Khomeini, Noor
- Shahid Beheshti, Noshahr

== Specialized clinics ==
- Baghban specialized and highly specialized complex
- Shahrvand Comprehensive Kidney Patients Center

== Research centers ==
- Orthopedics
- Cellular and Molecular Biology
- Thalassemia
- Toxoplasmosis
- Laboratory Animals
- Diabetes
- Gastrointestinal cancer
- Psychiatry and Behavioral Sciences
- Immune genetics
- Sexual and reproductive health
- Traditional and complementary medicine
- Pediatric Infection
- Health Sciences
- Pharmaceutical Sciences
- Invasive fungi
- Cardiovascular
- Digestion and liver
- Demographic studies
- Microbial resistance
- Addiction Research Institute
- Development of Islamic Education and Health Sciences Research in Region 1
- Plant and animal products health
- Hemoglobinopathy Research Institute

== Research ==
MazUMS has published 1674 scientific articles in domestic journals and conferences. MazUMS is the owner and publisher of 6 specialized journals and so far holding 8 conferences. In addition, 6243 authoritative international articles have been published from this center so far. In 1398, researchers at Mazandaran University of Medical Sciences and Health Services published most of their articles with the keywords "cancer" and "breast cancer".
