= Gharib Mahalleh, Gilan =

Gharib Mahalleh غريب محله
- Village
- Location within Iran
- Coordinates: 37°44′27″N 48°59′10″E
- Country: Iran
- Province: Gilan
- County: Talesh
- Bakhsh: Asalem
- Rural District: Asalem

Population (2016)
  - Total: 246
- Time zone: UTC+3:30 (IRST)

Gharib Mahalleh (Persian: غريب محله, also Romanized as Gharīb Maḩalleh) is a village in Asalem Rural District, Asalem District, Talesh County, Gilan Province, Iran. At the 2006 census, its population was 253, in 63 families. In 2016, it had 246 people in 78 households.
