= Panj Hezareh Rural District =

Rural district in Mazandaran province, Iran

Panj Hezareh Rural District Persian: دهستان پنج هزاره
- Rural District
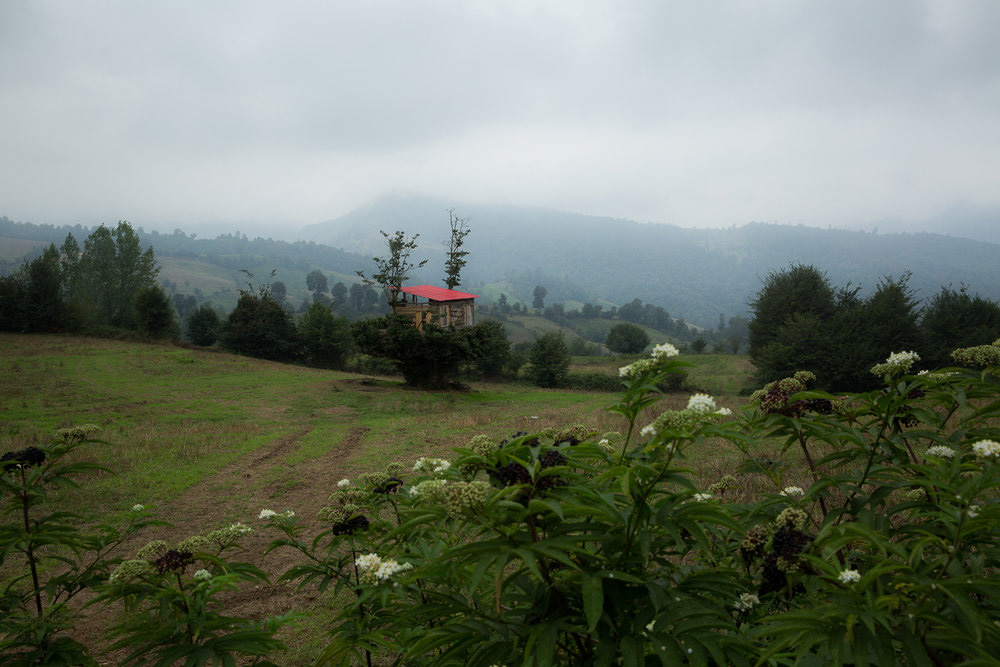
- Landscape near the village of Gharib Mahalleh

- Location within Iran
- Coordinates: 36°42′N 53°38′E
- Country: Iran
- Province: Mazandaran
- County: Behshahr
- District: Central
- Established: 1987
- Capital: Khalil Shahr

Population (2016)
  - Total: 3,772
- Time zone: UTC+3:30 (IRST)

Panj Hezareh Rural District (Persian: دهستان پنج هزاره) is in the Central District of Behshahr County, Mazandaran province, Iran. Its capital was the village of Alamdar Mahalleh, now a neighborhood in the city of Khalil Shahr.

== Demographics ==
=== Population ===
At the time of the 2006 National Census, the rural district's population was 3,653 in 839 households. There were 3,299 inhabitants in 933 households at the following census of 2011. The 2016 census measured the population of the rural district as 3,772 in 1,200 households. The most populous of its nine villages was Pasand, with 1,721 people.

=== Other villages in the rural district ===
- Chalek Deh
- Galesh Mahalleh
- Gharib Mahalleh
- Mohammadabad
- Rudbar Yakhkesh
- Shirdari
- Tazehabad
- Valam
