= Rostamkola =

City in Mazandaran province, Iran

Rostamkola Persian: رستمکلا
- City
- Old section in the city of Rostamkola

- Location within Iran
- Coordinates: 36°40′44″N 53°25′47″E
- Country: Iran
- Province: Mazandaran
- County: Behshahr
- District: Central

Population (2016)
  - Total: 11,686
- Time zone: UTC+3:30 (IRST)

Rostamkola (Persian: رستمکلا) (Note: Also romanized as Rostam Kalā, Rostam Kelā, Rostamkela, and Rostamkelā; also known as Rostam Kūlā and Rustam Qal‘eh) is a city in the Central District of Behshahr County, Mazandaran province, Iran.

== History ==
The origin of the name 'Rostamkela' is not known for certain, but local folklore connects it with a man named Rostam (to be identified possibly with the legendary warrior of that name) who helped unite the people of the area.

The main economic activity is based on Agriculture. Other productions are Avi-culture, Brick manufacturing, Flour manufacturing, Metal Industries and Limestone.

The first school was built in 1925. In addition, Rostamkela has a religious school that was built by Allameh Ayazi.

During the reign of Reza Shah, the Trans-Iranian Railway was constructed and Rostamkela Depot was built at the same time. There is a special railway which conveys from Rostamkela to Amir Abad seaport and a special road will be opened between them soon.

Qanat was used to provide reliable supply water for irrigation in Rostamkela. Rostamkela is located in ancient district which included Gorji Mahale, Asiabsar, Kouhestan, Troujan villages. Gohar Tape is a city (1800–3000 BC) mounded near Rostamkela.

Rostamkola preserves several historical structures dating back to the Qajar era, including the Soltani and Haj Hasan tekyehs, the Alizade and Farahi hoseiniehs, and the traditional Rostamkelaei and Tavakeli houses. Additionally, the local Imamzadeh building dates back several centuries.

There are many beautiful places in Rostamkela such as Mirevoun (Mehravan, a famous place that is located in jungle).

The descendants of Rostamkela's original "founders" are still to be found here, and they can relate numerous stories concerning the founding of the city. In all these stories obtained from numerous descendants, it is believed and confirmed that their ancestors were of noble lineage. The origin of this noble lineage is unknown, yet the suspicions are strengthened by numerous anecdotes. All are linked to a man with deep-set blue eyes who settled the land, where after the village slowly grew into a town. The descendants often have blue eyes, though also green and brown. The descendants believe steadfastly that they are of noble lineage, though their exact ancestry is unknown. The land has been filled with Persian and Parthian nobles throughout the ages.

== Demographics ==
=== Population ===
At the time of the 2006 National Census, the city's population was 11,306 in 3,055 households. The following census in 2011 counted 11,553 people in 3,457 households. The 2016 census measured the population of the city as 11,686 people in 3,979 households.

== Geography ==
=== Location ===
Rostamkola is between Neka and Behshahr near Road 22. It is 38 kilometres (24 mi) away from the provincial center, (Sari) and 13 kilometres (8.1 mi) and 11 kilometres (6.8 mi) from Neka and Behshahr respectively.

Rostamkola has a railway station, connecting it to Behshahr and Gorgan in east and Neka and Sari in west.

=== Climate ===
Climate data for Rostamkola (coordinates:36.58°N 53°E), 2001-2010 precipitation nomals
Month	Jan	Feb	Mar	Apr	May	Jun	Jul	Aug	Sep	Oct	Nov	Dec	Year
Average precipitation mm (inches)	46.9 (1.85)	54.5 (2.15)	66.7 (2.63)	45.6 (1.80)	33.0 (1.30)	20.7 (0.81)	15.8 (0.62)	18.7 (0.74)	38.8 (1.53)	59.8 (2.35)	87.0 (3.43)	69.2 (2.72)	556.7 (21.93)
Source: IRIMO
