= Bandar Torkaman =

City in Golestan province, Iran

Bandar Torkaman Persian: بندرتركمن
- City
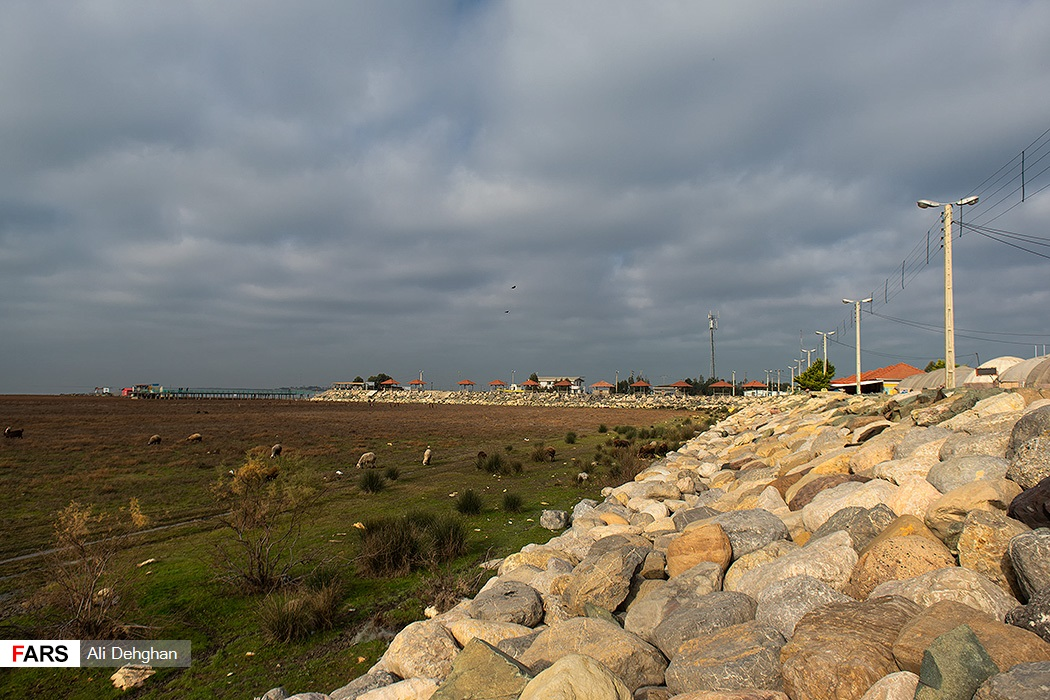
- Bandar Torkaman Seaside, 2019

- Location within Iran
- Coordinates: 36°54′05″N 54°04′25″E
- Country: Iran
- Province: Golestan
- County: Torkaman
- District: Central

Population (2016)
  - Total: 53,970
- Time zone: UTC+3:30 (IRST)

Bandar Torkaman (Persian: بندرتركمن) (Note: Also romanized as Bandar-e Torkaman, Bandar-e Torkeman, and Bandar-e Torkman; formerly Bandar Shah (بَندَرِ شاه), also romanized as Bandar Shāh and Bandar-e Shāh; Turkmen: Bender-Türkmen) is a city in the Central District of Torkaman County, Golestan province, Iran, serving as the capital of both the county and the district.

It is a port on the Caspian Sea, approximately 375 km (233 mi) from Tehran. Some 3 km (1.9 mi) west of Bandar Torkaman is Ashuradeh Island.

== Demographics ==
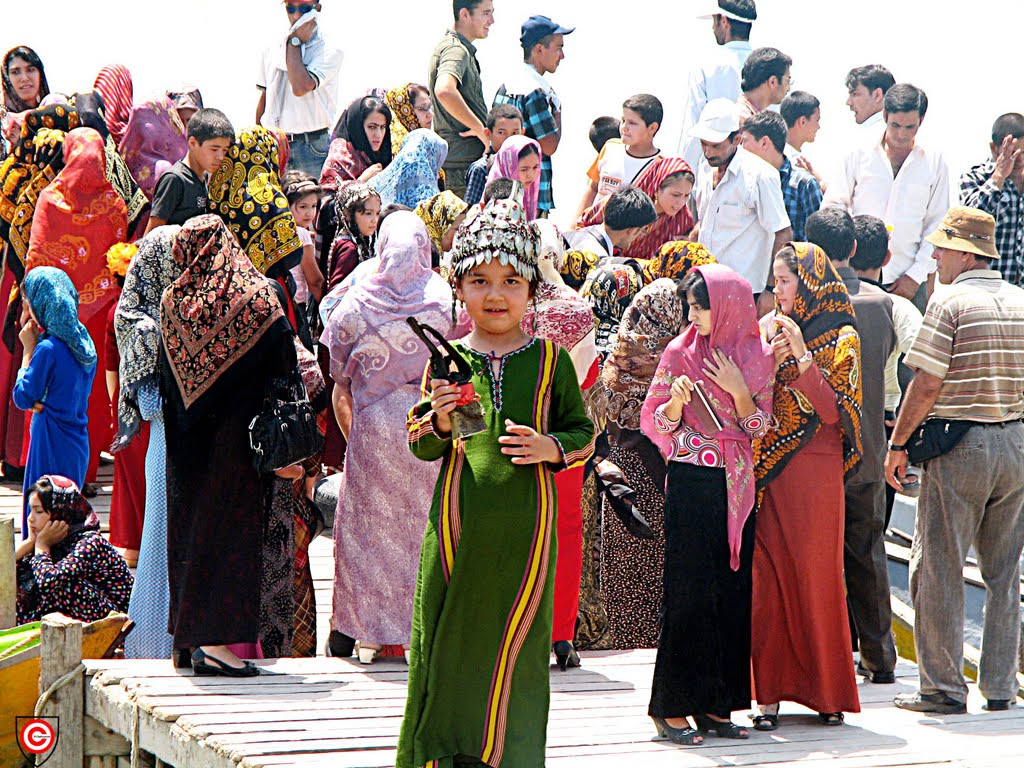
Iranian Turkmen in Bandar Torkaman

=== Population ===
At the time of the 2006 National Census, the city's population was 45,045 in 9,755 households. The following census in 2011 counted 48,736 people in 11,869 households. The 2016 census measured the population of the city as 53,970 people in 14,512 households.

== Economy ==
The economy is based on agriculture, handicrafts, animal husbandry, fishing and tourism, with 50 percent of Iranian caviar being extracted near this port. Ashuradeh Island attracts many tourists. Bandar Torkaman is also called "Cotton Island". Cotton is grown abundantly in the harbor which makes Bandar Torkaman a strategic cotton-cultivator in the country.

== Tourism ==
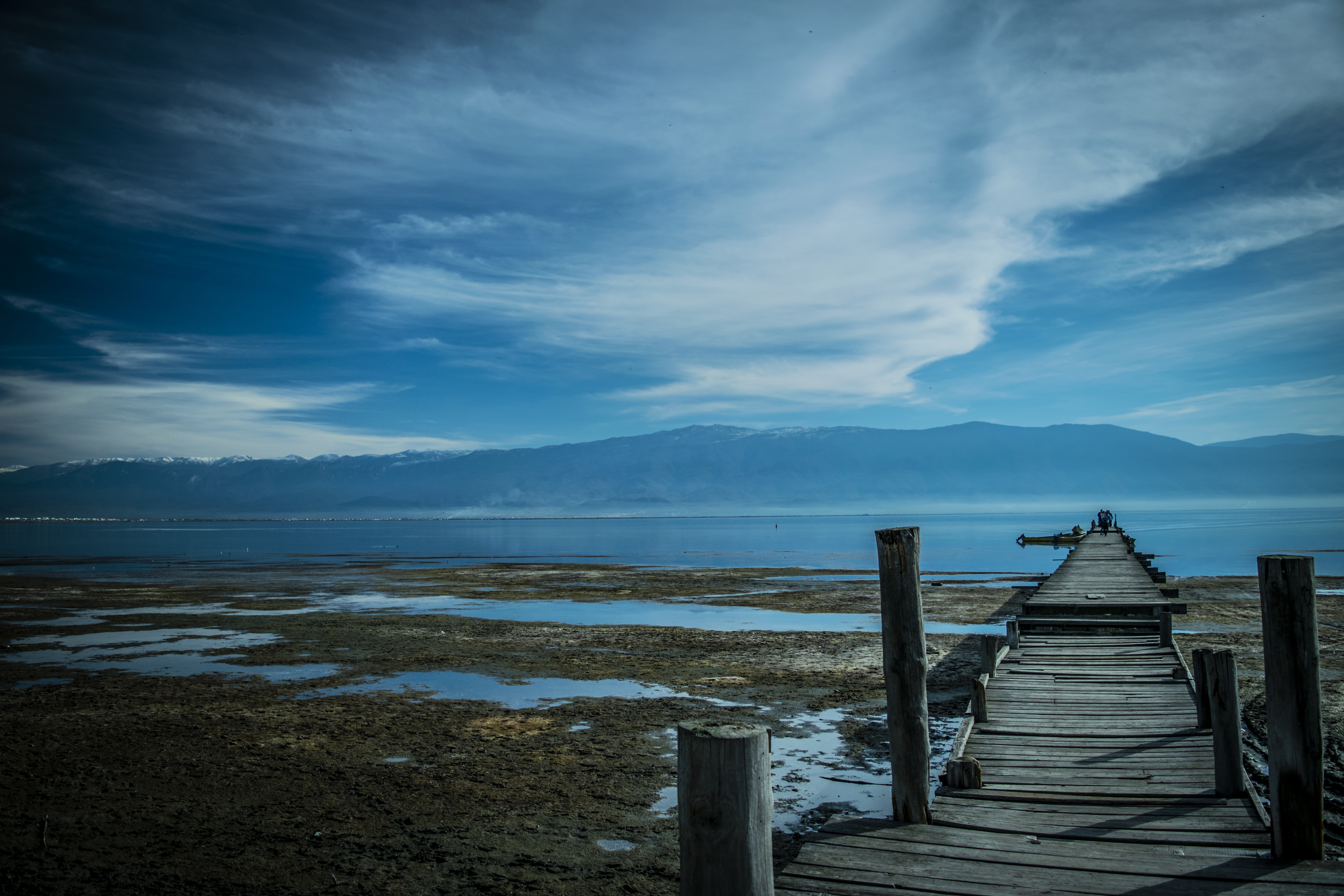
A picture of the Bandar Torkaman pier

In the past, the city was equipped with three big jetties and was used by Allied Forces after the Anglo-Soviet invasion of Iran during World War II for transportation of equipment. However, two jetties have sunk, and presently due to poor equipment and the gradual decline of water, Bandar Torkaman possesses only one jetty, is no longer bustling, and is mostly used to communicate with Ashuradeh Island. During Nowruz (New Iranian Year) and summers, this jetty is full of seasonal merchants who bring Turkman fabricated objects to the city for sale. Ashuradeh Island is a main attraction of the region.

== Environment ==
During the colder months of the year, the Gomishan lagoon, Bandar Torkaman's highly biodiverse wetland habitat, hosts many thousands of migrating birds from icy Siberia, far to the northeast, including cranes, ducks, storks and geese.

== Carpets ==
Carpet-weaving is a major source of income for the inhabitants. Turkmen cushions, carpets, prayer rugs, and felt mats woven in this region are not only sold in other cities within Iran but are also exported throughout the world (See Persian carpet). Turkmen cushions and carpets are known for their ancient patterns. Jajim (rustic textiles, similar to mats or blankets), and Palas (homespun woolen cloth), woven by local craftspeople, are yet further regional art-forms which showcase the time-honoured traditions and skills of the Turkmen of northeastern Iran, who share a common cultural heritage with their neighbors in nearby Turkmenistan.

== Culture ==
=== Traditions ===
During the Ramadan mourning season the residents rejoice, feast, and spray rose water and perfume in the mosques. On the first day of Ramazan they cook special oily bread and distribute them in the mosques and to neighbors. Also on the night of Ghadr, the young ones receive presents from their elders, mostly in the form of cash. Then they go to the market and buy sweetmeats and candy and hold a feast in their homes.

In Bandar Torkaman, the 'Laleh' singing ceremony has been performed for many centuries. Women assemble and sing Laleh' which is a melancholy song. Its composer is unknown, but the song laments the hard life of brides in ancient times among Turkmans, historical events, love of life, and the pain of separation from the tribe and homeland. Historically, brides were separated from their native tribes and were taken to distant regions by their husbands and often never saw their parents again. Thus in their loneliness it was the following charming and melancholy song which gave them comfort:

Tell me if the mountain beside our village still stands? Are the jungles there still full of fruit? O white birds which are flying, tell me if my clan and friends are safe and sound.

For five days during Fitr or Qorban (sacrifice) holidays the Turkman rejoice and feast. They open their house gates to permit any stranger who is passing the town to step into the house and join their feast.

When a child is being born they repeat the old proverb which says: "If the newborn is a son he will become a farmer and if a girl she will become carpet weaver." This shows the importance they attach to farming and carpet weaving.

In the past, when Turkman tribesmen moved from one place to another, they did not carry some of their heavy belongings and instead buried them in graves; because of the sanctity of graveyards, nobody dared to steal the items.

When courting, the groom-to-be must prepare a Qatlama, which is a special sweetmeat. If the bride's family accepts the Qatlama, it means that they agree to the wedding. The family of the bride-groom adorns a camel with ornamented clothes and lays a litter on it to mount the bride over the animal and carry her to the groom's house. The camel is driven by a respected elder among the tribe and at times by the groom himself. However, with the arrival of cars, this tradition has been abandoned in most cities; but in remote mountainous regions such as Gelidagh, Maraveh tappeh, Dashli boroon and Kalaleh, the bride is still carried away according to the tradition.

Turkmans hold a unique ceremony for circumcision. On the day of this occasion they invite all their relatives for a feast and celebration.

In this city, the people who arrive at the age of 63 hold a feast for having attained the age of the Islamic prophet Muhammad and kill a white sheep to serve the guests.

=== Food ===
The Turkmans have varied dishes and in there is also a special place where a specific dish is cooked. Chekdirmeh and Soozmeh are the daily food of the Turkmans which are normally made of rice and oil. Among other dishes one can refer to are Chourba (Shourba), which is made of vegetable and boiled meat; Oonash, a soup made of dough strings or vermicelli; Qateqliash, which is a kind of soup made of yoghurt, rice and garlic; Swidliash, composed of milk and rice; Bulamaq, composed of oil and rice, and Qatoorqa, made of smoked and ground wheat, rice and sugar.

=== Dress ===
Traditional dress includes a skin cap and a loose red garment called Doon for men, Kooyink a loose skirt for women, Yaliq (worn by women at home instead of chador), and Boorik, a hat worn by girls before marriage, are the only traditional items which have survived in this northern port. Normally after marriage the girl replaces Boorik with Alangi which is another hat.

=== Sports and recreation ===
Horse racing is the most important recreation in Bandar Torkaman which takes place in the spring and autumn. The competition is held in the main racing field which is about 100 hectares in size. The horse racing competition in Bandar Torkaman has many admirers in the country, especially in Tehran and Gonbade Kavoos. Even fans from the Persian Gulf States visit Bandar Torkaman to watch the races.

One of the favorite sports among the Turkmans is the traditional Goorehesh wrestling in which two rivals wrestle with each other without age or weight limitation. They take hold of each other's belt and the one who succeeds to lay the rival's back on the ground is pronounced winner and receives a present called Bayraq, which is either a ram or ewe. Ram is a symbol of uprightness and bravery among Turkmans and is much respected by them. To praise the strength and valor of a youth, he is said to resemble a ram.

Dagger (sword) play is another popular sport among Turkman youth. This is a religious/mystical ceremony in which the youth wear loose colorful garments, congregate in a field and raise their hands on their heads in the form of prayer. The man who bears the sword sings musical odes with a charming voice and the ceremony continues until they tighten their circle into a knot. The sword bearer then raises the sword as a token of valor and other members firmly grasp each other's hands as a token of valor and solidarity.

== See also ==
Media related to Bandar Torkaman at Wikimedia Commons
