= Shahid Salimi Combined Cycle Power Plant =

Power Plant

Coordinates: 36.838°N 53.259°E

Shahid Salimi Combined Cycle Power Plant (Persian: نیروگاه سیکل ترکیبی شهید سلیمی ) or Neka Power plant (Persian: نیروگاه نکا) is one of the largest power plants in Iran, the construction of which began in 1975 and was completed in 1979 after 4 years. This power plant consists of two independent parts, heating and combined cycle, which is located on the Caspian Sea coast, 22 km north of Neka city. The nominal power of this power plant is 2214 MW, which consists of four steam units each with a nominal power of 440 MW, a combined cycle unit consisting of two gas units each with a nominal power of 137 MW, and a steam unit with a nominal power of 160 MW and two expansion turbines with power. The name of each is 9 MW.

== Environmental pollution ==
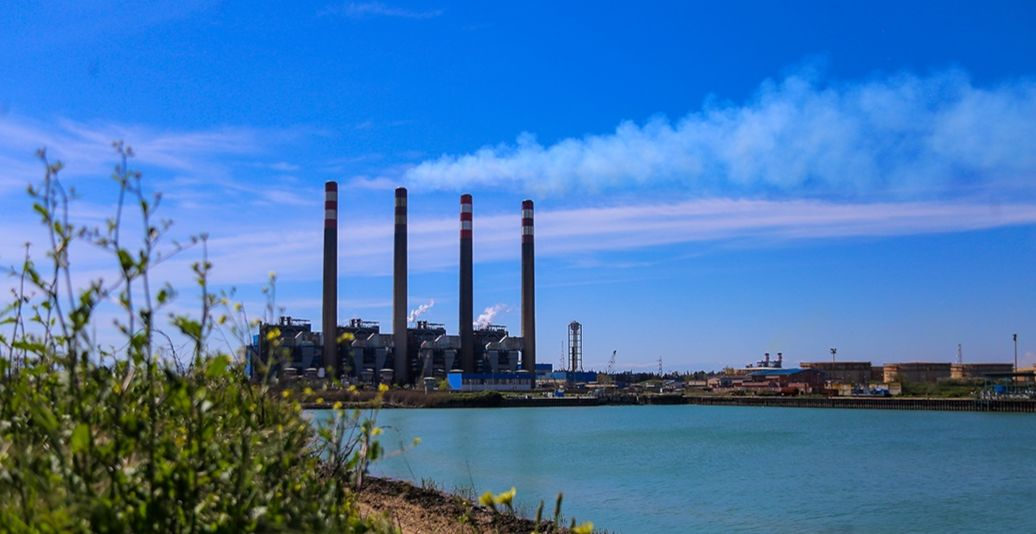
Shahid Salimi Power Plant

Due to the consumption of mazut (fuel oil) by this power plant, the destructive environmental effects on the surrounding residential areas are evident.

== Awards ==
The steam unit of this power plant was selected as the model power plant in Iran in 2008 in terms of providing full capacity during peak times in summer.
