= Miankaleh peninsula =

Miankaleh peninsula شبه‌جزیره میان‌کاله Miyānkāle peninsula
- Peninsula
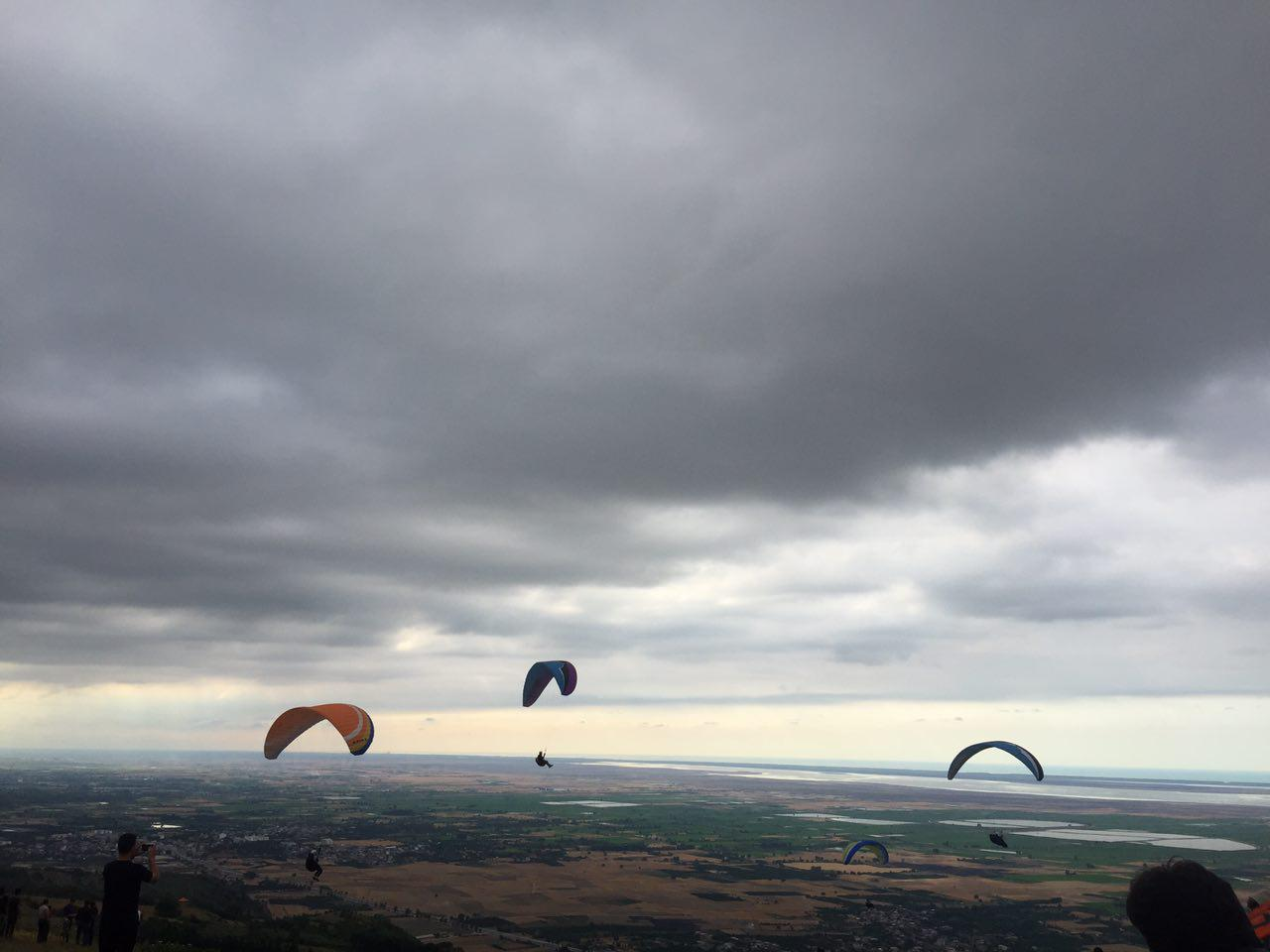

- Location within Caspian Sea
- Coordinates: 36.8833°N 53.75°E
- Country: Iran
- Province: Māzandarān Province
- Sea: Caspian Sea

Designations

Ramsar Wetland
- Official name: Miankaleh Peninsula, Gorgan Bay and Lapoo-Zaghmarz Ab-bandan
- Designated: 23 June 1975
- Reference no.: 36

Miyānkāle peninsula (Persian: شبه‌جزیره میان‌کاله) is a long, narrow peninsula in Behshahr County of Māzandarān Province in the north of Iran situated in the extreme south-eastern part of the Caspian Sea. The elongate peninsula is 48 kilometres (30 miles) long, and between 1.3 and 3.2 kilometres (1,400 and 3,500 yards) wide.

It sets apart the Gorgan Bay from the Caspian Sea. The elevation of the peninsula from the sea level is –23 meters. Four villages are situated on it, namely: Ashuradeh, Qezel-e shomali, Qezel-Mehdi, and Qavasatl. The city situated at the opposite side of the peninsula's end is Bandar Torkaman. The island of Ashuradeh lies off the eastern tip of the peninsula.

== Geographical location ==
Miyankale is a peninsula that borders the Caspian Sea from the north, the Miyankale wetland from the south, and the Lepoi Marsh of Behshahr from the west. the area of Miyankale is about 68 thousand hectares. The average annual rainfall in this peninsula is 717 mm, and its climatic condition is considered hot humid to moderate.

== Ecology ==
UNESCO Biosphere Reserves in Iran

Miankaleh peninsula is one of the richest ecological havens in West Asia and perhaps in the whole world. It is home to many unique Caspian bird and reptile species native to this region. It is also a very important internationally recognized refuge for migratory birds. Flora and fauna include:

- Plants: Raspberry, common medlar, Mediterranean hackberry, Jerusalem thorn, Populus, Salsola, Cyperaceae, and Polygonum;
- Fish: Common carp, Caspian white fish, zander, crucian carp, mullet;
- Birds: Coot, purple swamphen, smew, flamingo, white-headed duck, red-breasted goose, whooper swan, black francolin, peregrine falcon, and little bustard;
- Mammals: Wolf, jackal, fox, hedgehog, wild boar, Caspian seal.

The peninsula, with Gorgan Bay, has been designated an International Wetland (Ramsar site) in 1975 and an international UNESCO Biosphere Reserve in 1976. On the national level, it is protected under the "Wildlife Refuge" status by the Iranian Dept. of Environment. The controlled harvest of Miankale pomegranate by natives and stakeholders is in line with the Human and Biosphere Reserve (MAB) program defined by UNESCO for biosphere reserves.

=== Siberian Tiger Introduction Project ===
One of the indigenous predators of Iran, the Caspian tiger, used to live in the north-western to north-eastern parts of the country. In 2010, a pair of Siberian tigers was sent from Russia to Iran's Tehran Zoological Garden in exchange for their Persian leopards. The Siberian tigers currently in captivity are set to be reintroduced in the wild to replace the Caspian tigers on the Miankaleh peninsula. Iran received two more pairs of Siberian tigers in 2012.

== Threats ==
This nature reserve is vulnerable to industry and tourism. While tourism-related activities continue to pollute the area, the Iranian government plans to build a huge hotel complex right in the middle of this nature park. Parts of the peninsula have already been sold by the government for industrial and residential purposes.

The number of migratory birds has fallen significantly during the past few years. Extensive fishing and hunting has damaged the ecological balance, and many species are either moribund or under threat of total extinction.

== Miankaleh Paleontology ==
Alluvial and shrubby traces of the fourth period cover the coastal areas of the Caspian Sea, including the Miankaleh Peninsula. Alluvial sediments from these areas are alternately composed of layers such as clay and sandstone along with scallop. The rocks of the slopes are large, sharp and angular, but in the coastal land of the Caspian Sea, like the middle of the mass of moving sand, they are full of animal and plant remains. In general, it can be said that these organizations are related to the Jurassic underwear organizations, which are all due to the retreat of the Caspian Sea.
