= Gulf of Gorgan =

Bay in Iran

Coordinates: 36°49′58.99″N 53°52′47.78″E

Designations

Ramsar Wetland
- Official name: Miankaleh Peninsula, Gorgan Bay and Lapoo-Zaghmarz Ab-bandan
- Designated: 23 June 1975
- Reference no.: 36

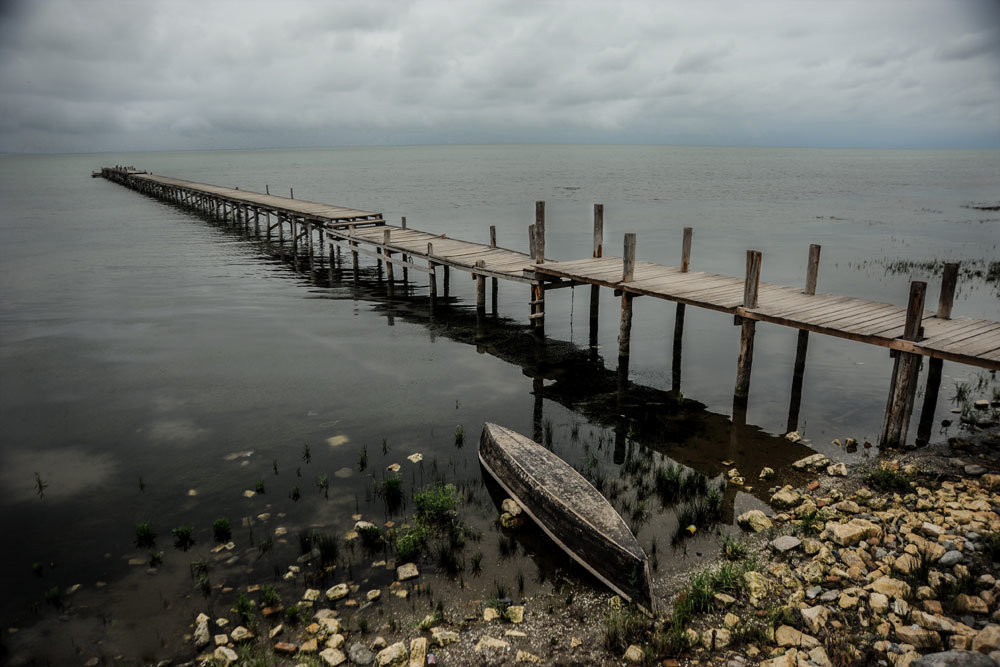
Gulf of Gorgan in 2016

The Gulf of Gorgan (Persian: خلیج گرگان), also known as Gorgan Bay, is the largest gulf in the Caspian Sea. It is located at the south-eastern shore of the Caspian Sea near the cities of Behshahr, Gorgan and Sari in Iran and is separated from the main water body by the Miankaleh peninsula and extends until the Ashuradeh peninsula.

The gulf and the peninsula form a wetland of about 100,000 ha with a maximum depth of 2 m in the bay. The elevation varies between 18 m and 25 m below sea level.

== Imperiled status ==
Due to evaporation and lack of water inflow, the gulf and the marshland suffer from increasing silting, with adverse effect to local marine life and economy. Inflow of freshwater from rivers such as the Qarasu reduces salinity, with the additional effect of the water becoming muddier. According to a member of the Caspian Sea National Research Center, the gulf will have vanished by 2025 "if no efficient remedial measure is adopted". A loss of 35% of the bay's area was estimated to have occurred between 2017 and 2021.

=== Potential causes and consequences of drying ===
Various perspectives exist regarding the causes of Gorgan Bay's drying. Some attribute it to Russia's policies concerning the Volga River, while others identify climate change, including reduced rainfall, increased temperatures, and evaporation, as the primary factor behind the desiccation of both the bay and the Miankaleh Lagoon. The drying of Gorgan Bay has the potential to trigger dust storms, impacting nearby cities and villages.

=== Proposed solutions ===
Several solutions have been proposed to mitigate the drying. Afforestation has been suggested, although concerns about its high cost have also been raised. Another proposal involves allowing the natural growth of native salt-tolerant plants to help prevent dust dispersion. Other suggested measures include pumping water into the bay and dredging.

In 2022, the Iranian government dredged the Ashuradeh channel in order to transfer water from the Caspian Sea to Gorgan Bay and Miankaleh Lagoon. When the channel opened in 2023, the water level in Gorgan Bay rose by 40 centimetres (16 in). Salicornia plants were added to neighboring dikes to prevent micro-scale dust storms. However, falling water levels in the Caspian Sea may necessitate water pumping in the future.
