= Khalil Shahr =

City in Mazandaran province, Iran

Khalil Shahr خلیل‌شهر
- City
- Location within Iran
- Coordinates: 36°42′00″N 53°38′24″E
- Country: Iran
- Province: Mazandaran
- County: Behshahr
- District: Central
- Established as a city: 2005

Government
  - Mayor: Mehran Taghi Zadeh

Population (2016)
  - Total: 11,032
- Time zone: UTC+3:30 (IRST)
- Website: www.khalilshahr.ir

Khalil Shahr (Persian: خلیل‌شهر) (Note: Also romanized as Khalīl Shahr; formerly Khalil Mahalleh (خلیل‌محله), also romanized as Khalīl Maḩalleh; also known as Khallī Mahalleh) is a city in the Central District of Behshahr County, Mazandaran province, Iran.

== History ==
In 2005, the villages of Alamdar Mahalleh (علمدار محله‌), Amuzad Mahalleh (عموزاد محله‌), Kermani Mahalleh (کرملنی محله‌), Geteh Zamin (گته‌زمین‌), Kelak (کلاک), Kashir Kheyl (کشیرخیل‌), Molla Mahalleh (ملامحله‌), Mali Kala (مالیکلا), Robat (رباط‌) and Rekavand (رکاوند) were merged to form the new city of Khalil Shahr.

== Demographics ==
=== Population ===
At the time of the 2006 National Census, the city's population was 10,096 in 2,485 households. The following census in 2011 counted 10,141 people in 2,869 households. The 2016 census measured the population of the city as 11,032 people in 3,298 households.
