= Central District (Behshahr County) =

District in Mazandaran province, Iran

Central District (Behshahr County) Persian: بخش مرکزی شهرستان بهشهر
- District
- Location within Iran
- Coordinates: 36°43′N 53°29′E
- Country: Iran
- Province: Mazandaran
- County: Behshahr
- Capital: Behshahr

Population (2016)
  - Total: 157,097
- Time zone: UTC+3:30 (IRST)

The Central District of Behshahr County (Persian: بخش مرکزی شهرستان بهشهر) is in Mazandaran province, Iran. Its capital is the city of Behshahr.

== Demographics ==
=== Population ===
At the time of the 2006 National Census, the district's population was 144,332 in 37,603 households. The following census in 2011 counted 148,279 people in 43,819 households. The 2016 census measured the population of the district as 157,097 inhabitants in 51,273 households.

=== Administrative divisions ===
Central District (Behshahr County) Population
Administrative Divisions	2006	2011	2016
Kuhestan RD	17,420	16,680	17,436
Miyan Kaleh RD	18,320	17,355	18,469
Panj Hezareh RD	3,653	3,299	3,772
Behshahr (city)	83,537	89,251	94,702
Khalil Shahr (city)	10,096	10,141	11,032
Rostamkola (city)	11,306	11,553	11,686
Total	144,332	148,279	157,097
RD = Rural District
