= Alarazbum =

Alarazbum الارزبوم
- Village
- Location within Iran
- Coordinates: 36°35′33″N 53°56′39″E
- Country: Iran
- Province: Mazandaran
- County: Behshahr
- Bakhsh: Yaneh Sar
- Rural District: Shohada
- Elevation: 1,500 m (4,900 ft)

Population (2016)
  - Total: 64
- Time zone: UTC+3:30 (IRST)

Alarazbum (Persian: الارزبوم, also Romanized as Alārazbūm and Alārz Būm; also known as Alārazbīm) is a village in Shohada Rural District, Yaneh Sar District, Behshahr County, Mazandaran Province, Iran. It is located 2 km (1.2 mi) south Neka river, on the foothill plains of eastern alborz range.

It is connected to the road between Galugah and Damghan. Nearby villages include Anderat in its north, Piteh Now to its south and Arzet and Parsa to its east.

== Demographics ==
At the 2016 census, the village's population was 64, in 23 families. Up from 45 people in 2006. Agricultural products include wheat, barley, rice, millet, vegetable corps and animal products. gelim and jajim weaving is common among the women of the village. The spoken language among people is Mazanderani language.
