= Estarem, Mazandaran =

Village in Mazandaran province, Iran

Estarem Persian: استارم
- Village
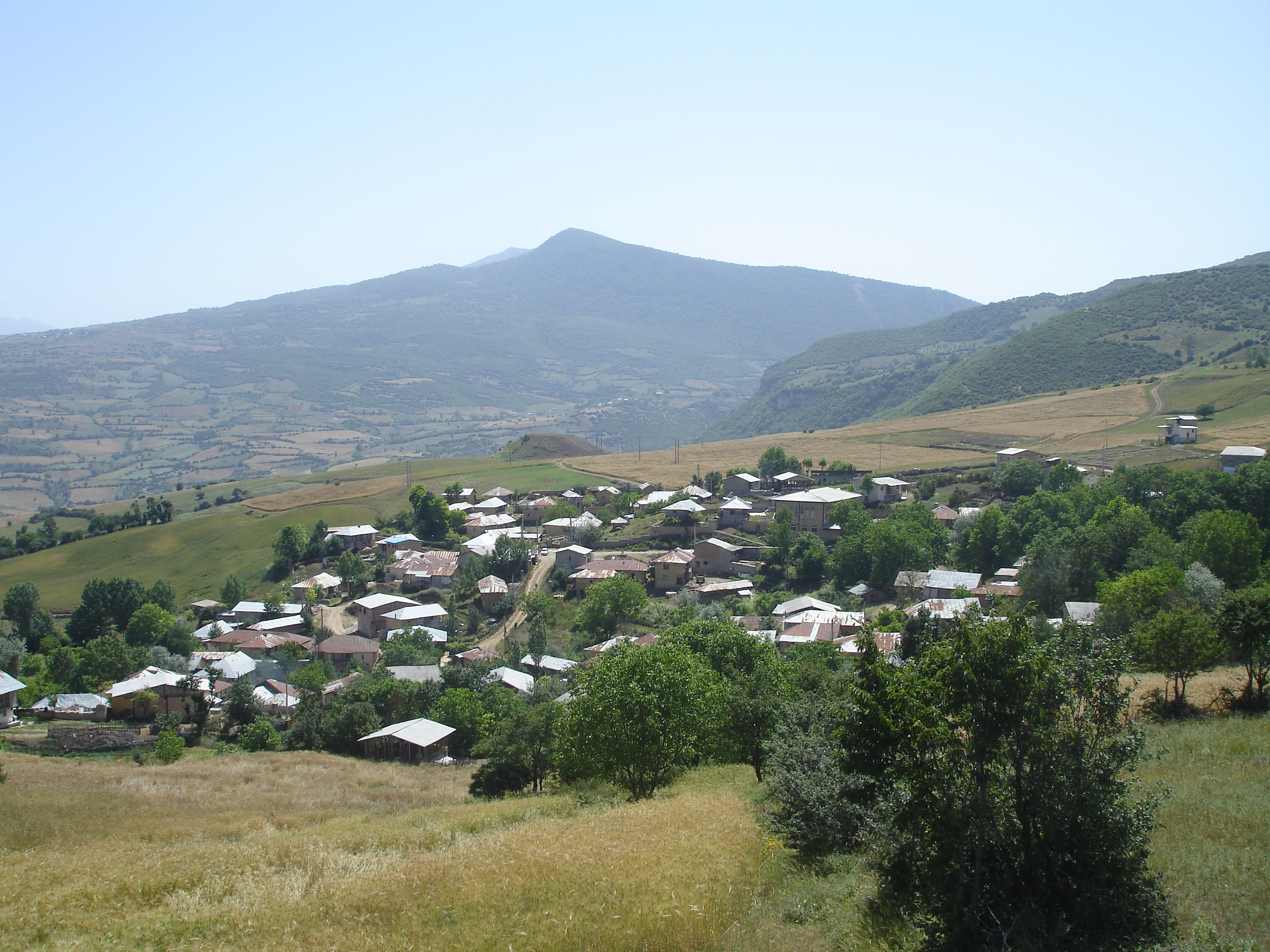
- The village of Estarem

- Location within Iran
- Coordinates: 36°33′43″N 53°54′10″E
- Country: Iran
- Province: Mazandaran
- County: Behshahr
- District: Yaneh Sar
- Rural District: Ashrestaq

Population (2016)
  - Total: 214
- Time zone: UTC+3:30 (IRST)

Estarem (Persian: استارم) (Note: Also romanized as Estāram and Estārem) is a village in Ashrestaq Rural District of Yaneh Sar District in Behshahr County, Mazandaran province, Iran.

== Demographics ==
=== Language ===
Estarem's people speak Mazandarani.

=== Population ===
At the time of the 2006 National Census, the village's population was 128 in 36 households. The following census in 2011 counted 102 people in 32 households. The 2016 census measured the population of the village as 214 people in 70 households.

== Overview ==
Estarem is connected to Galugah-Damghan road through rural roads. Nearby villages are Fetkash in the north, Vaneshid in the southwest, and Kaftar Kar in the northwest.

The village's agricultural products include wheat, barley, rice, millet, honey, and animal products.
