= Parsa, Mazandaran =

Parsa پارسا
- Village
- Location within Iran
- Coordinates: 36°36′12″N 53°57′40″E
- Country: Iran
- Province: Mazandaran
- County: Behshahr
- Bakhsh: Yaneh Sar
- Rural District: Shohada
- Elevation: 1,400 m (4,600 ft)

Population (2016)
  - Total: 112
- Time zone: UTC+3:30 (IRST)

Parsa (Persian: پارسا, also Romanized as Pārsā) is a village in Shohada Rural District, Yaneh Sar District, Behshahr County, Mazandaran Province, Iran.

It is located in the eastern Alborz mountain range, in the easternmost parts of Mazandaran. It borders the fields and villages of Galugah County to its north, Anderat and Alarazbum to its west and southwest, Galugah-Damghan road with Piteh Now to its south, and Arzet to its east.

== Demographics ==
At the 2016 census, The village's population was 112, in 40 families. Up from 75 in 2006.

People of Parsa speak Mazanderani. Agricultural products include wheat, rice, barley, millet, vegetable crops and animal products.
