= Aliabad, Behshahr =

Aliabad علی‌آباد
- Village
- Location within Iran
- Coordinates: 36°29′43″N 53°57′35″E
- Country: Iran
- Province: Mazandaran
- County: Behshahr
- Bakhsh: Yaneh Sar
- Rural District: Shohada
- Village: Paband

Population (2006)
  - Total: 22
- Time zone: UTC+3:30 (IRST)

Aliabad (Persian: علی‌آباد, also Romanized as ‘Alīābād) is a neighborhood in the village of Paband in Shohada Rural District, in Yaneh Sar District of Behshahr County, Mazandaran Province, Iran.

At the 2006 census, its population was 22, in 6 families, when it was a separate village northeast of Paband. It was last mentioned in 2011 census, when its recorded population was only 7 people in 4 households.
