= Yakh Kesh =

Village in Mazandaran province, Iran

Yakh Kesh Persian: يخ كش
- Village
- Location within Iran
- Coordinates: 36°37′10″N 53°44′40″E
- Country: Iran
- Province: Mazandaran
- County: Behshahr
- District: Yaneh Sar
- Rural District: Shohada

Population (2016)
  - Total: 417
- Time zone: UTC+3:30 (IRST)

Yakh Kesh (Persian: يخ كش) (Note: Also romanized as Yakh Kash) is a village in Shohada Rural District of Yaneh Sar District in Behshahr County, Mazandaran province, Iran.

== Demographics ==
=== Population ===
At the time of the 2006 National Census, the village's population was 658 in 154 households, when it was in Ashrestaq Rural District. The following census in 2011 counted 338 people in 111 households. The 2016 census measured the population of the village as 417 people in 147 households, by which time it had been transferred to Shohada Rural District.
