= Pachet =

Village in Mazandaran province, Iran

Pachet Persian: پچت
- Village
- Location within Iran
- Coordinates: 36°34′42″N 53°44′38″E
- Country: Iran
- Province: Mazandaran
- County: Behshahr
- District: Yaneh Sar
- Rural District: Ashrestaq
- Elevation: 1,100 m (3,600 ft)

Population (2016)
  - Total: 291
- Time zone: UTC+3:30 (IRST)

Pachet (Persian: پچت) (Note: Also known as Pacham and Pajat) is a village in Ashrestaq Rural District of Yaneh Sar District in Behshahr County, Mazandaran province, Iran.

== Demographics ==
=== Language ===
People of Pachet speak the Mazanderani language.

=== Population ===
At the time of the 2006 National Census, the village's population was 169 in 53 households. The following census in 2011 counted 117 people in 39 households. The 2016 census measured the population of the village as 291 people in 98 households.

== Geography ==
Pachet is 20 km (12 mi) southeast of Behshahr, in the eastern Alborz mountains. It has access to the road connecting Galugah to Damghan, as well as Behshahr-Gorgan road. The closest villages to Pachet are Parem to its east and Sheykh Mahalleh to its west. Neka river is to the north of these villages and runs from east to west.
