= Jirband =

Neighborhood in Mazandaran province, Iran

Jirband Persian: جيربند
- Neighborhood
- Location within Iran
- Coordinates: 36°30′45″N 53°46′18″E
- Country: Iran
- Province: Mazandaran
- County: Behshahr
- District: Yaneh Sar
- Rural District: Ashrestaq
- Village: Jirband va Jurband

Population (2011)
  - Total: 102
- Time zone: UTC+3:30 (IRST)

Jirband (Persian: جيربند) (Note: Also romanized as Jīrband) is a neighborhood in the village of Jirband va Jurband in Ashrestaq Rural District of Yaneh Sar District in Behshahr County, Mazandaran province, Iran.

== Demographics ==
=== Population ===
At the time of the 2006 National Census, Jirband's population was 128 in 36 households, when it was a village in Ashrestaq Rural District. The following census in 2011 counted 102 people in 40 households. After the census, the village merged with the village of Jurband to become the new village of Jirband va Jurband.

== Geography ==
Jirband is in the mountains of Alborz, 130 km (81 miles) away from Sari. It has cool, temperate weather that attracts tourists.
