= Jirband va Jurband =

Village in Mazandaran province, Iran

Jirband va Jurband Persian: جير بند و جوربند
- Village
- Location within Iran
- Coordinates: 36°30′58″N 53°46′21″E
- Country: Iran
- Province: Mazandaran
- County: Behshahr
- District: Yaneh Sar
- Rural District: Ashrestaq

Population (2016)
  - Total: 274
- Time zone: UTC+3:30 (IRST)

Jirband va Jurband (Persian: جير بند و جوربند) (Note: Also romanized as Jīrband va Jūrband; formerly known as Jurband, also romanized as Jūrband) is a village in Ashrestaq Rural District of Yaneh Sar District in Behshahr County, Mazandaran province, Iran.

== Demographics ==
=== Population ===
At the time of the 2006 National Census, the village's population, as Jurband, was 70 in 20 households. The following census in 2011 counted 39 people in 15 households. The 2016 census measured the population of the village as 274 people in 90 households, by which time Jurband had merged with the village of Jirband to become the new village of Jirband va Jurband.
