= Pajim =

Village in Mazandaran province, Iran

Pajim Persian: پجيم
- Village
- Location within Iran
- Coordinates: 36°36′58″N 53°43′22″E
- Country: Iran
- Province: Mazandaran
- County: Behshahr
- District: Yaneh Sar
- Rural District: Shohada

Population (2016)
  - Total: 421
- Time zone: UTC+3:30 (IRST)

Pajim (Persian: پجيم) (Note: Also romanized as Pajīm; also known as Pacham) is a village in Shohada Rural District of Yaneh Sar District in Behshahr County, Mazandaran province, Iran.

== Demographics ==
=== Population ===
At the time of the 2006 National Census, the village's population was 399 in 93 households, when it was in Ashrestaq Rural District. The following census in 2011 counted 354 people in 111 households. The 2016 census measured the population of the village as 421 people in 147 households, by which time it had been transferred to Shohada Rural District.
