= Ahangar Kola, Behshahr =

Ahangar Kola آهنگركلا
- Village
- Location within Iran
- Coordinates: 36°30′32″N 53°44′49″E
- Country: Iran
- Province: Mazandaran
- County: Behshahr
- Bakhsh: Yaneh Sar
- Rural District: Ashrestaq
- Elevation: 1,100 m (3,600 ft)

Population (2016)
  - Total: 71
- Time zone: UTC+3:30 (IRST)

Ahangar Kola (Persian: آهنگركلا, also Romanized as Āhangar Kolā) is a village in Ashrestaq Rural District, Yaneh Sar District, Behshahr County, Mazandaran Province, Iran. At the 2016 census, its population was 71, in 29 families. Up from 54 in 2006.

People of Ahangar Kola speak Mazanderani, and are employed in farming and animal husbandry. The village's main agricultural products are wheat, barley, honey and animal products.
