= Arzet =

Village in Mazandaran province, Iran

Arzet Persian: ارضت
- Village
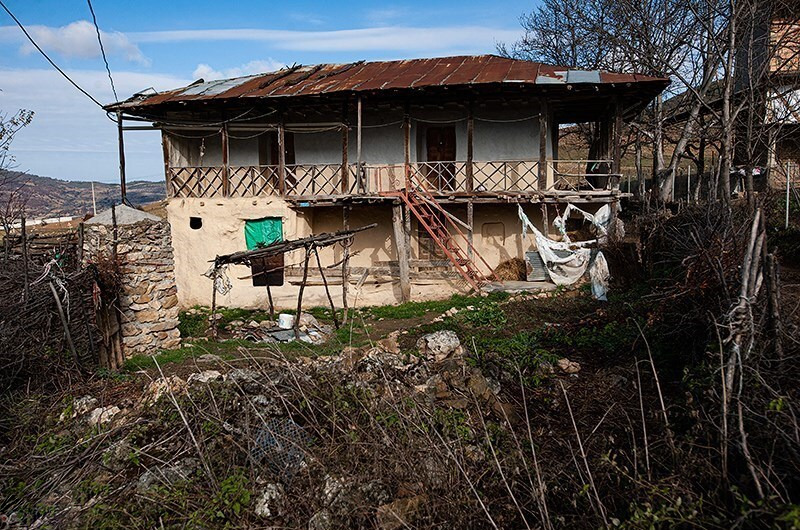
- A house in the village of Arzet

- Location within Iran
- Coordinates: 36°36′00″N 53°58′18″E
- Country: Iran
- Province: Mazandaran
- County: Behshahr
- District: Yaneh Sar
- Rural District: Shohada

Population (2016)
  - Total: 535
- Time zone: UTC+3:30 (IRST)

Arzet (Persian: ارضت) (Note: Also romanized as Arẕet; also known as Erzer) is a village in Shohada Rural District of Yaneh Sar District in Behshahr County, Mazandaran province, Iran.

== Geography ==
Arzet is in the Alborz mountains at a height of 1,500 m (4,900 ft), connected to the village of Parsa to the west and Badeleh Darreh to the east.

== Demographics ==
=== Population ===
At the time of the 2006 National Census, the village's population was 540 in 133 households. The following census in 2011 counted 269 people in 75 households. The 2016 census measured the population of the village as 535 people in 164 households. It was the most populous village in its rural district.

== See also ==
Media related to Arzet at Wikimedia Commons
