= Bandesar, Mazandaran =

Coordinates: 36°34′45″N 53°50′47″E

Bandesar بندسر
- Village
- Interactive map of Bandesar
- Country: Iran
- Province: Mazandaran
- County: Behshahr
- Bakhsh: Yaneh Sar
- Rural District: Ashrestaq

Population (2016)
  - Total: 166
- Time zone: UTC+3:30 (IRST)

Bandesar (Persian: بندسر) is a village in Ashrestaq Rural District, Yaneh Sar District, Behshahr County, Mazandaran Province, Iran. At the 2006 census, its population was 166, in 59 families. Up from 125 people in 2006.
