= Parch, Mazandaran =

Parch پارچ
- Village
- Location within Iran
- Coordinates: 36°32′25″N 53°45′49″E
- Country: Iran
- Province: Mazandaran
- County: Behshahr
- Bakhsh: Yaneh Sar
- Rural District: Ashrestaq
- Elevation: 1,350 m (4,430 ft)

Population (2006)
  - Total: 196
- Time zone: UTC+3:30 (IRST)

Parch (Persian: پارچ, also Romanized as Pārch) is a village in Ashrestaq Rural District, Yaneh Sar District, Behshahr County, Mazandaran Province, Iran. At the 2016 census, its population was 158, in 50 families. Down from 196 in 2006.

Parch is on the northern foothills of eastern Alborz mountains, and is surrounded by forests to its north and south. The nearest village is Samchul to its west. Parch is connected to Galugah-Damghan road through rural roads.

The spoken language by the people is Mazandarani. Parch's agricultural products include wheat, barley, millet and animal products.
