= Sefid Chah =

Village in Mazandaran province, Iran

Sefid Chah Persian: سفيدچاه, Persian: اسپه چاه
- Village
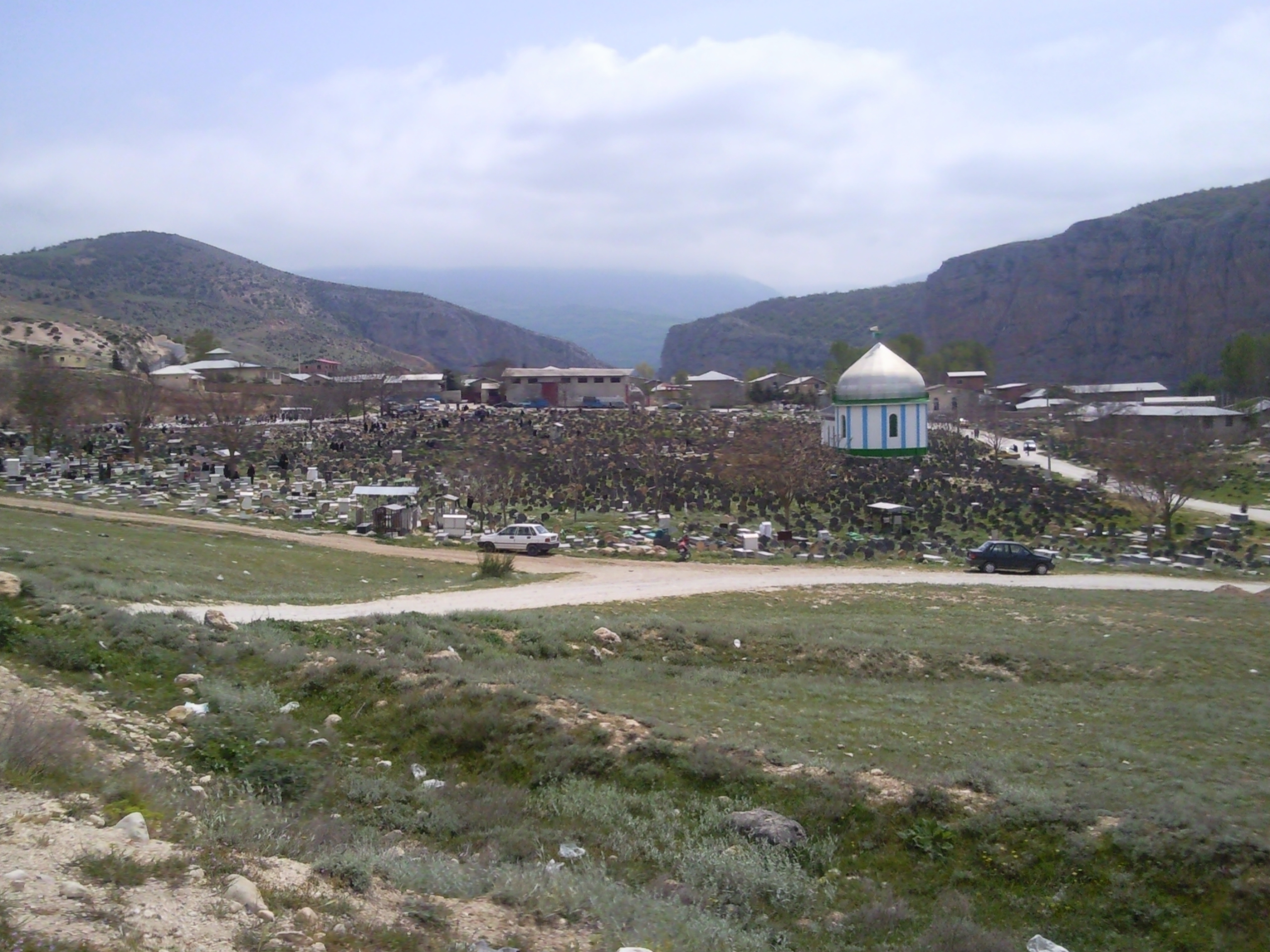
- Sefid Chah Cemetery

- Location within Iran
- Coordinates: 36°36′06″N 53°53′06″E
- Country: Iran
- Province: Mazandaran
- County: Behshahr
- District: Yaneh Sar
- Rural District: Shohada

Population (2016)
  - Total: 137
- Time zone: UTC+3:30 (IRST)

Sefid Chah (Persian: سفيدچاه) (Note: Also romanized as Sefīd Chāh; also known as Sefīd Jāh; known in Mazandarani as Espe Chah Persian: اسپه چاه) is a village in, and the capital of, Shohada Rural District in Yaneh Sar District of Behshahr County, Mazandaran province, Iran.

== Etymology ==
The literal meaning of Sefid Chah is "The White Well." The reason for naming the village is the white soil that is seen in the cemetery due to the presence of lime.

== Demographics ==
=== Population ===
At the time of the 2006 National Census, the village's population was 99 in 26 households. The following census in 2011 counted 351 people in 55 households. The 2016 census measured the population of the village as 137 people in 47 households.

== Cemetery ==
The old cemetery of Sefid Chah, was registered as a national monument of Iran on 8 March 2003. The cemetery dates back to the Timurid period and is considered one of the first Muslim cemeteries in Iran.

According to research and studies conducted by various soil research institutes, the soil of this cemetery contains large amounts of lime, and bodies in this type of soil decompose over a longer period of time than other types of cemetery soil. It is believed by the people of this village that if they are buried in this cemetery, their bodies will remain intact or will not suffer any damage.

The gender of the people buried there is indicated in a special way. If there is a shape of a double-headed shoulder on the stone installed on the grave, the grave belongs to a man, and if there is a shape of a single-headed shoulder on the gravestone, the person buried in that place is a woman.
