= Afte Let =

Afte Let افتلت
- Village
- Location within Iran
- Coordinates: 36°32′50″N 53°50′20″E
- Country: Iran
- Province: Mazandaran
- County: Behshahr
- Bakhsh: Yaneh Sar
- Rural District: Ashrestaq
- Elevation: 1,600 m (5,200 ft)

Population (2016)
  - Total: 72
- Time zone: UTC+3:30 (IRST)

Afte Let (Persian: افتلت; also known as Aftelīţ, Aqtalat, Oftlat, and Oft Lat) is a village in Ashrestaq Rural District, Yaneh Sar District, Behshahr County, Mazandaran Province, Iran. At the 2016 census, its population was 72, in 24 families.

People of Afte Let speak Mazanderani and are employed in farming, animal husbandry and beekeeping. The village's agricultural products are wheat, barley, honey, potatoes, millet and animal products.
