= Sang Ruj =

Sang Ruj سنگ روج
- Village
- Location within Iran
- Coordinates: 36°31′57″N 53°58′49″E
- Country: Iran
- Province: Mazandaran
- County: Behshahr
- Bakhsh: Yaneh Sar
- Rural District: Shohada

Population (2006)
  - Total: 184
- Time zone: UTC+3:30 (IRST)

Sang Ruj (Persian: سنگ روج, also Romanized as Sang Rūj; also known as Sang Karūch, Sang Rūch, and Sankarūch) is a village in Shohada Rural District, Yaneh Sar District, Behshahr County, Mazandaran Province, Iran. At the 2016 census, its population was 155, in 55 families. Down from 184 in 2006.
