= Idin, Iran =

Idin عيدين
- Village
- Location within Iran
- Coordinates: 36°29′49″N 53°49′24″E
- Country: Iran
- Province: Mazandaran
- County: Behshahr
- Bakhsh: Yaneh Sar
- Rural District: Ashrestaq

Population (2006)
  - Total: 210
- Time zone: UTC+3:30 (IRST)

Idin (Persian: عيدين, also Romanized as ‘Īdīn and ‘Eydīn) is a village in Ashrestaq Rural District, Yaneh Sar District, Behshahr County, Mazandaran Province, Iran. At the 2016 census, its population was 196, in 59 families. Down from 210 in 2006.
