= Par Kola =

Village in Mazandaran province, Iran

Par Kola Persian: پركلا
- Village
- Location within Iran
- Coordinates: 36°32′47″N 53°42′44″E
- Country: Iran
- Province: Mazandaran
- County: Behshahr
- District: Yaneh Sar
- Rural District: Ashrestaq

Population (2016)
  - Total: 398
- Time zone: UTC+3:30 (IRST)

Par Kola (Persian: پركلا) (Note: Also romanized as Par Kalā, Par Kolā, Por Kalā, and Por Kolā) is a village in Ashrestaq Rural District of Yaneh Sar District in Behshahr County, Mazandaran province, Iran.

== Demographics ==
=== Population ===
At the time of the 2006 National Census, the village's population was 350 in 81 households. The following census in 2011 counted 276 people in 90 households. The 2016 census measured the population of the village as 398 people in 135 households.
