= Kohneh Kumeh =

Kohneh Kumeh كهنه كومه
- Village
- Interactive map of Kohneh Kumeh
- Coordinates: 36°30′08″N 53°53′54″E
- Country: Iran
- Province: Mazandaran
- County: Behshahr
- Bakhsh: Yaneh Sar
- Rural District: Ashrestaq

Population (2016)
  - Total: 52
- Time zone: UTC+3:30 (IRST)

Kohneh Kumeh (Persian: كهنه كومه, also Romanized as Kohneh Kūmeh) is a village in Ashrestaq Rural District, Yaneh Sar District, Behshahr County, Mazandaran Province, Iran. At the 2006 census, its population was 52, in 18 families. Increased from 15 people in 2006.
