= Lamrad =

Lamerd لَمِرد
- Village
- Location within Iran
- Coordinates: 36°31′10″N 53°47′11″E
- Country: Iran
- Province: Mazandaran
- County: Behshahr
- Bakhsh: Yaneh Sar
- Rural District: Ashrestaq

Population (2016)
  - Total: 122
- Time zone: UTC+3:30 (IRST)

Lamerd (Persian: لَمِرد) is a village in Ashrestaq Rural District, Yaneh Sar District, Behshahr County, Mazandaran Province, Iran. At the 2016 census, its population was 122, in 41 families.
