= Paband, Mazandaran =

Paband پابند
- Village
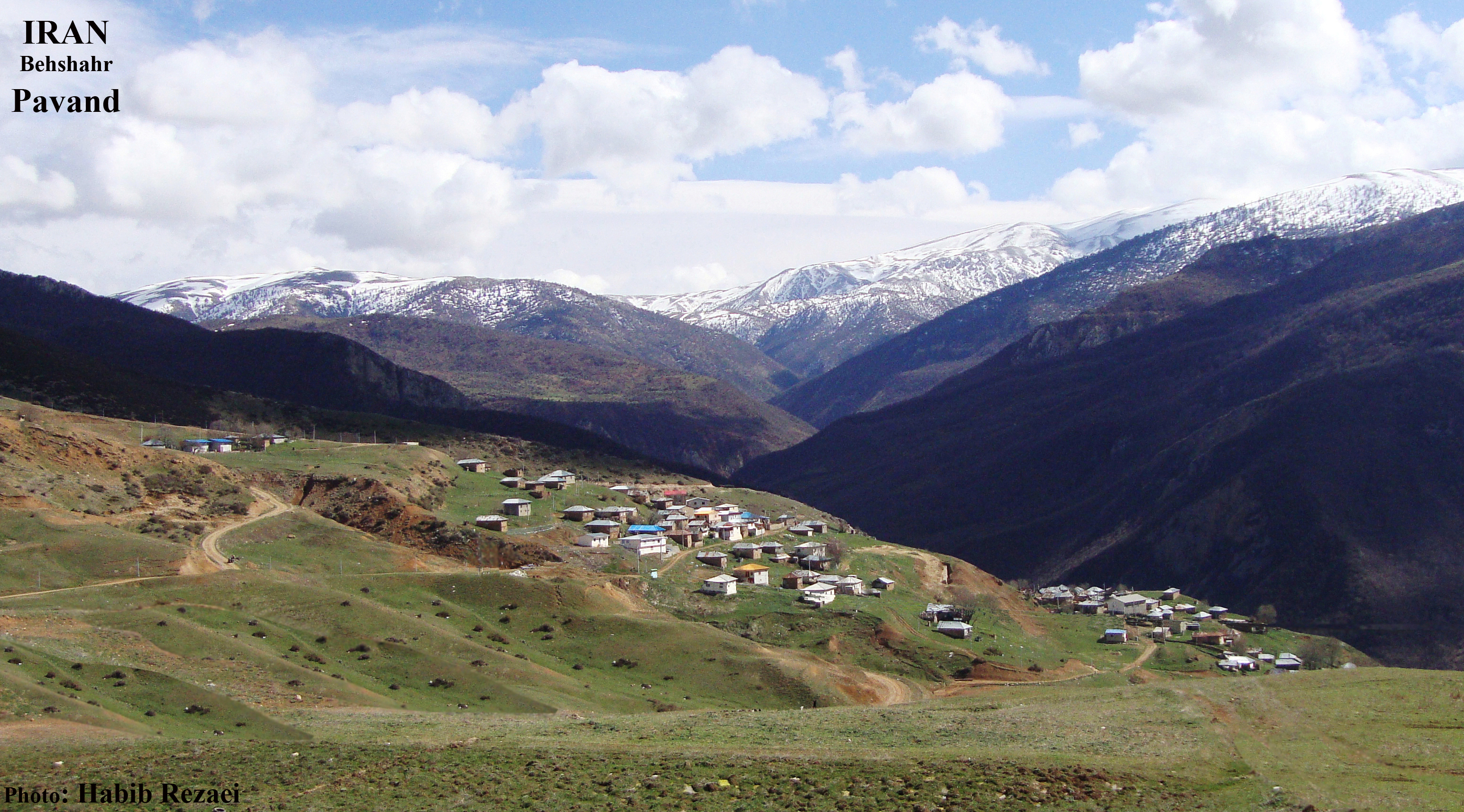

- Location within Iran
- Coordinates: 36°29′16″N 53°57′34″E
- Country: Iran
- Province: Mazandaran
- County: Behshahr
- Bakhsh: Yaneh Sar
- Rural District: Shohada
- Elevation: 1,750 m (5,740 ft)

Population (2006)
  - Total: 360
- Time zone: UTC+3:30 (IRST)

Paband (Persian: پابند, also Romanized as Pāband; also known as Pāvand) is a village in Shohada Rural District, Yaneh Sar District, Behshahr County, Mazandaran Province, Iran.

== Geography ==
Paband is a mountainous village, located in the eastern Alborz mountains. The village is located south of Paband no-hunting area and northeast of Paband national park. Paband consists of 7 neighborhoods: Ali Abad, Darvish Abad, Arab Kheyl, Aroos Mahalleh, Mian Deleh, Balasar and Painsar.

== Demographics ==
People of Paband speak the Tabari language. The profession of the villagers are farming and animal husbandry.

At the 2016 census, its population was 266, in 92 families. Down from 360 people in 2006 census.
