= Kava Darreh =

Kava Darreh كوادره
- Village
- Location within Iran
- Coordinates: 36°32′05″N 53°52′56″E
- Country: Iran
- Province: Mazandaran
- County: Behshahr
- Bakhsh: Yaneh Sar
- Rural District: Ashrestaq

Population (2016)
  - Total: 72
- Time zone: UTC+3:30 (IRST)

Kava Darreh (Persian: كوادره, also Romanized as Kavā Darreh and Kevā Darreh) is a village in Ashrestaq Rural District, Yaneh Sar District, Behshahr County, Mazandaran Province, Iran. At the 2016 census, its population was 72, in 23 families. Up from 39 people in 2006.
