= Sabeq Mahalleh =

Sabeq Mahalleh سابق محله
- Village
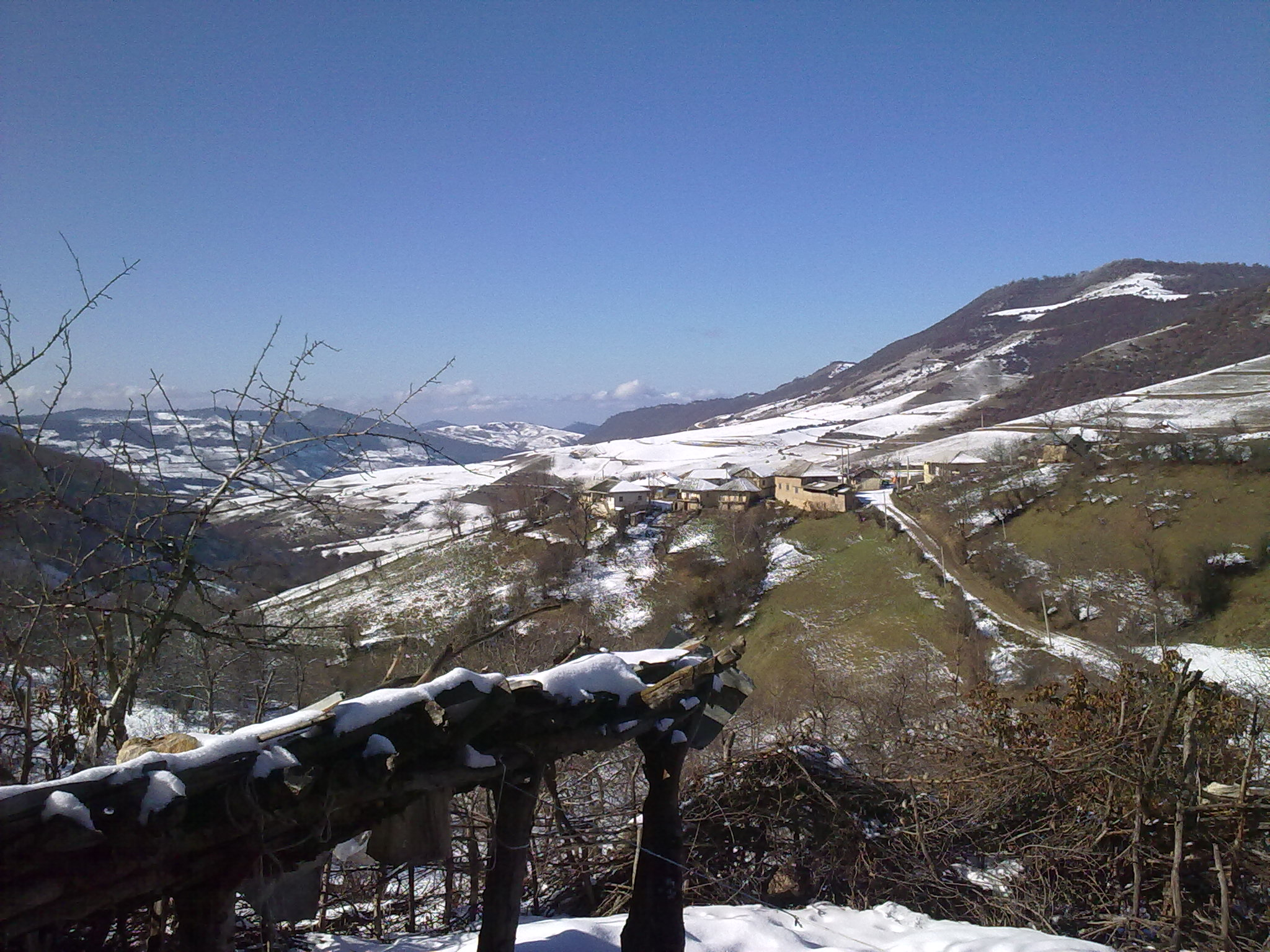

- Location within Iran
- Coordinates: 36°30′42″N 53°49′03″E
- Country: Iran
- Province: Mazandaran
- County: Behshahr
- Bakhsh: Yaneh Sar
- Rural District: Ashrestaq

Population (2016)
  - Total: 173
- Time zone: UTC+3:30 (IRST)

Sabeq Mahalleh (Persian: سابق محله, also Romanized as Sābeq Maḩalleh; also known as Mehalleh and Sabeq) is a village in Ashrestaq Rural District, Yaneh Sar District, Behshahr County, Mazandaran Province, Iran. At the 2016 census, its population was 173, in 54 families. Up from 120 people in 2006.
