= Chalu, Behshahr =

Chalu چالو
- Village
- Location within Iran
- Coordinates: 36°29′29″N 53°52′55″E
- Country: Iran
- Province: Mazandaran
- County: Behshahr
- Bakhsh: Yaneh Sar
- Rural District: Ashrestaq

Population (2016)
  - Total: 64
- Time zone: UTC+3:30 (IRST)

Chalu (Persian: چالو, also Romanized as Chālū) is a village in Ashrestaq Rural District, Yaneh Sar District, Behshahr County, Mazandaran Province, Iran. At the 2016 census, its population was 64, in 21 families. Up from 55 in 2006.
