= Sorkh Geriveh =

Village in Mazandaran province, Iran

Sorkh Geriveh Persian: سرخ گريوه
- Village
- Location within Iran
- Coordinates: 36°33′42″N 54°03′07″E
- Country: Iran
- Province: Mazandaran
- County: Behshahr
- District: Yaneh Sar
- Rural District: Shohada

Population (2016)
  - Total: 347
- Time zone: UTC+3:30 (IRST)

Sorkh Geriveh (Persian: سرخ گريوه) (Note: Also romanized as Sorkh Gerīveh; also known as Sorkh Chārī, Sorkh Geryeh, and Surkhchari) is a village in Shohada Rural District of Yaneh Sar District in Behshahr County, Mazandaran province, Iran.

== Demographics ==
=== Population ===
At the time of the 2006 National Census, the village's population was 342 in 98 households. The following census in 2011 counted 219 people in 84 households. The 2016 census measured the population of the village as 347 people in 120 households.
