= Velu, Mazandaran =

Village in Mazandaran province, Iran

Velu Persian: ولو
- Village
- Location within Iran
- Coordinates: 36°30′36″N 53°43′13″E
- Country: Iran
- Province: Mazandaran
- County: Behshahr
- District: Yaneh Sar
- Rural District: Ashrestaq

Population (2016)
  - Total: 203
- Time zone: UTC+3:30 (IRST)

Velu (Persian: ولو) (Note: Also romanized as Velow and Velū) is a village in Ashrestaq Rural District of Yaneh Sar District in Behshahr County, Mazandaran province, Iran.

== Demographics ==
=== Population ===
At the time of the 2006 National Census, the village's population was 224 in 51 households. The following census in 2011 counted 114 people in 38 households. The 2016 census measured the population of the village as 203 people in 61 households.
