= Kova =

Kova may refer to:

- KOVA, the original callsign of KFYV
- Kava, Iran, romanized as Kova
- Kovu, a character in the Lion King franchise, pronounced as Kova

== People with the surname ==
- Kalvi Kõva (born 1974), Estonian politician
- Valentina Kova, American fashion designer
- Frank de Kova (1910–1981), American character actor
