= Zelet =

Zelet زلت
- Village
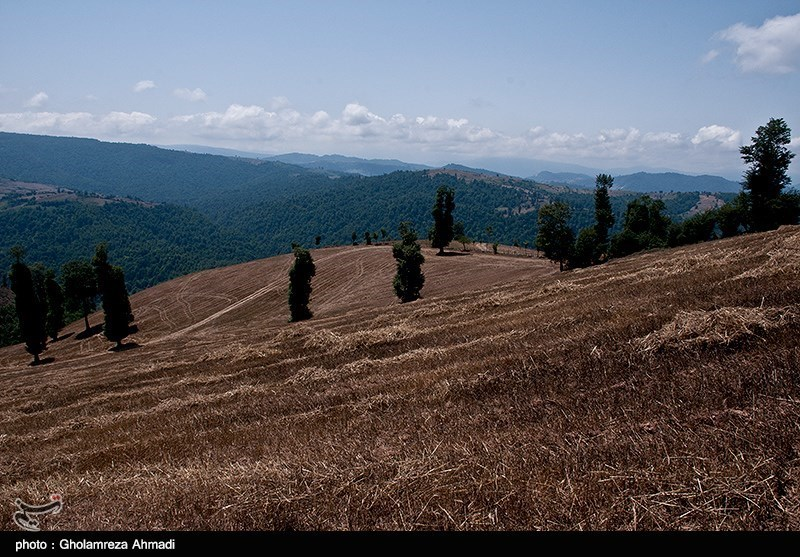
- Nature of Zelet

- Location within Iran
- Coordinates: 36°36′42″N 53°42′27″E
- Country: Iran
- Province: Mazandaran
- County: Behshahr
- Bakhsh: Yaneh Sar
- Rural District: Shohada

Population (2016)
  - Total: 197
- Time zone: UTC+3:30 (IRST)

Zelet (Persian: زلت) is a village in Shohada Rural District, Yaneh Sar District, Behshahr County, Mazandaran Province, Iran. At the 2016 census, its population was 197, in 65 families.
