= Gat Cheshmeh =

Gat Cheshmeh گت چشمه
- Village
- Location within Iran
- Coordinates: 36°32′25″N 53°57′28″E
- Country: Iran
- Province: Mazandaran
- County: Behshahr
- Bakhsh: Yaneh Sar
- Rural District: Shohada
- Elevation: 1,760 m (5,770 ft)

Population (2016)
  - Total: 184
- Time zone: UTC+3:30 (IRST)

Gat Cheshmeh (Persian: گت چشمه, also Romanized as Gach Cheshmeh and Kat Cheshmeh) is a village in Shohada Rural District, Yaneh Sar District, Behshahr County, Mazandaran Province, Iran. At the 2016 census, its population was 184, in 57 families. Up from 176 in 2006.

People of Gat Cheshmeh speak Mazanderani language. Agricultural products of the village include wheat, barley, rice, vegetable crops and Animal product.
