= Gornam =

Village in Mazandaran province, Iran

Gornam Persian: گرنام
- Village
- Location within Iran
- Coordinates: 36°34′31″N 53°47′36″E
- Country: Iran
- Province: Mazandaran
- County: Behshahr
- District: Yaneh Sar
- Rural District: Ashrestaq

Population (2016)
  - Total: 277
- Time zone: UTC+3:30 (IRST)

Gornam (Persian: گرنام) (Note: Also romanized as Gornām) is a village in Ashrestaq Rural District of Yaneh Sar District in Behshahr County, Mazandaran province, Iran.

== Demographics ==
=== Population ===
At the time of the 2006 National Census, the village's population was 262 in 57 households. The following census in 2011 counted 117 people in 38 households. The 2016 census measured the population of the village as 277 people in 92 households.
