= Pacham =

Pacham (Persian: پچم) may refer to:

- Pacham, Kerman
- Pacham, Mazandaran (disambiguation)
