= Alaraz, Iran =

Alaraz الارز
- Village
- Location within Iran
- Coordinates: 36°33′49″N 53°56′28″E
- Country: Iran
- Province: Mazandaran
- County: Behshahr
- Bakhsh: Yaneh Sar
- Rural District: Shohada
- Elevation: 1,400 m (4,600 ft)

Population (2016)
  - Total: 267
- Time zone: UTC+3:30 (IRST)

Alaraz (Persian: الارز, also Romanized as Alāraz, Alārz, and Elārz) is a village in Shohada Rural District, Yaneh Sar District, Behshahr County, Mazandaran Province, Iran. At the 2016 census, its population was 267, in 86 families. Large increase from 80 people in 2006.

People of Alaraz speak Mazanderani. Agricultural products include wheat, rice, barley, potatoes, apple, pear, peach, walnut, honey and animal products.
