= Kord Mahalleh =

Kord Mahalleh (Persian: كردمحله) may refer to:

- Kord Mahalleh, Fuman, Gilan province
- Kord Mahalleh, Lahijan, Gilan province
- Kord Mahalleh, Sowme'eh Sara, Gilan province
- Kord Mahalleh, Babol, Mazandaran province
- Kord Mahalleh, Behshahr, Mazandaran province
- Kord Mahalleh, Chalus, Mazandaran province
- Kord Mahalleh, Nur, Mazandaran province
