= Estarm =

Estarm or Estarem or Estaram (Persian: استارم) may refer to:

- Estarm, Kerman
- Estarem, Mazandaran
