= Abdollahi =

Abdollahi عبدالهی
- Village
- Location within Iran
- Coordinates: 36°35′31″N 54°02′09″E
- Country: Iran
- Province: Mazandaran
- County: Behshahr
- Bakhsh: Yaneh Sar
- Rural District: Shohada

Population (2006)
  - Total: 227
- Time zone: UTC+3:30 (IRST)

Abdollahi (Persian: عبدالهی, also Romanized as ‘Abdollāhī, ‘Abdolahī, and ‘Abdolláhī) is a village in Shohada Rural District, Yaneh Sar District, Behshahr County, Mazandaran Province, Iran. At the 2016 census, its population was 189, in 62 families. Down from 227 in 2006.
