= Sang Darreh =

Sang Darreh سنگ دره
- Village
- Location within Iran
- Coordinates: 36°32′14″N 53°50′32″E
- Country: Iran
- Province: Mazandaran
- County: Behshahr
- Bakhsh: Yaneh Sar
- Rural District: Ashrestaq

Population (2006)
  - Total: 116
- Time zone: UTC+3:30 (IRST)

Sang Darreh (Persian: سنگ دره) is a village in Ashrestaq Rural District, Yaneh Sar District, Behshahr County, Mazandaran Province, Iran. At the 2016 census, its population was 55, in 19 families. Decreased from 116 people in 2006.
