= Shiler =

Shiler شيلر
- Village
- Location within Iran
- Coordinates: 36°32′47″N 53°48′40″E
- Country: Iran
- Province: Mazandaran
- County: Behshahr
- Bakhsh: Yaneh Sar
- Rural District: Ashrestaq

Population (2016)
  - Total: 187
- Time zone: UTC+3:30 (IRST)

Shiler (Persian: شيلر, also Romanized as Shīler; also known as Shelīr and Shelīt) is a village in Ashrestaq Rural District, Yaneh Sar District, Behshahr County, Mazandaran Province, Iran. At the 2016 census, its population was 187, in 61 families.
