= Kola, Behshahr =

Kola كلا
- Village
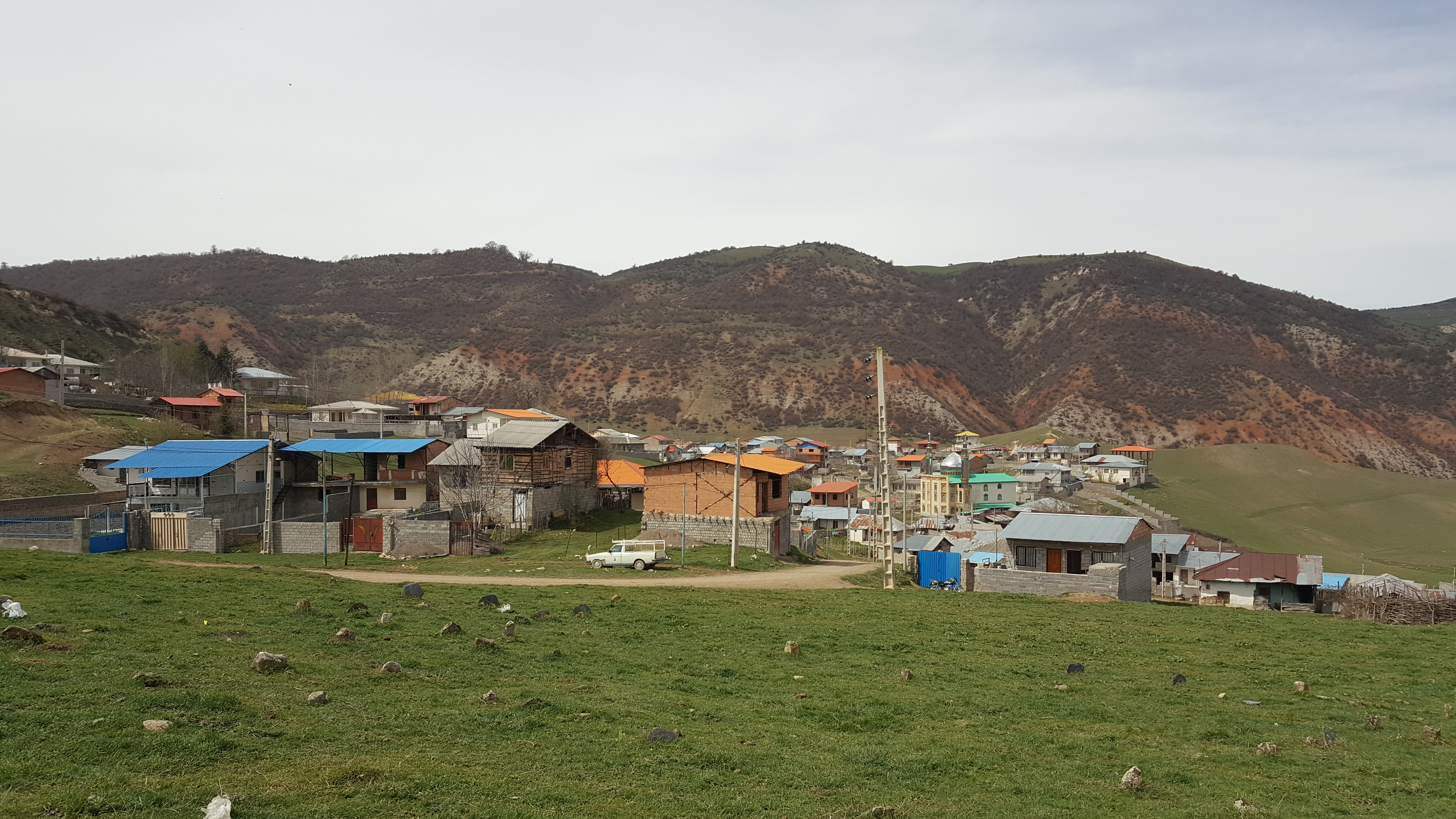

- Location within Iran
- Coordinates: 36°28′51″N 53°50′19″E
- Country: Iran
- Province: Mazandaran
- County: Behshahr
- Bakhsh: Yaneh Sar
- Rural District: Ashrestaq

Population (2016)
  - Total: 153
- Time zone: UTC+3:30 (IRST)

Kola (Persian: كلا, also Romanized as Kolā and Kalā; also known as Kolā Darreh) is a village in Ashrestaq Rural District, Yaneh Sar District, Behshahr County, Mazandaran Province, Iran. At the 2016 census, its population was 153, in 59 families. Up from 99 people in 206.
