= Kiasar (disambiguation) =

Kiasar is a city in Mazandaran Province, Iran.

Kiasar (Persian: كياسر) may also refer to:

- Kiasar, Alborz
- Kiasar, Gilan
- Kiasar, Behshahr, Mazandaran Province
