= Gholami, Iran =

Village in Mazandaran province, Iran

Gholami Persian: غلامي
- Village
- Location within Iran
- Coordinates: 36°31′25″N 53°54′48″E
- Country: Iran
- Province: Mazandaran
- County: Behshahr
- District: Yaneh Sar
- Rural District: Ashrestaq

Population (2016)
  - Total: 393
- Time zone: UTC+3:30 (IRST)

Gholami (Persian: غلامی) (Note: Also romanized as Gholāmī) is a village in Ashrestaq Rural District of Yaneh Sar District in Behshahr County, Mazandaran province, Iran.

== Demographics ==
=== Population ===
At the time of the 2006 National Census, the village's population was 123 in 40 households. The following census in 2011 counted 85 people in 30 households. The 2016 census measured the population of the village as 393 people in 124 households.
