= Lujandeh =

Lujandeh لوجنده
- Village
- Location within Iran
- Coordinates: 36°30′06″N 53°44′58″E
- Country: Iran
- Province: Mazandaran
- County: Behshahr
- Bakhsh: Yaneh Sar
- Rural District: Ashrestaq

Population (2006)
  - Total: 313
- Time zone: UTC+3:30 (IRST)

Lujandeh (Persian: لوجنده, also Romanized as Lūjandeh) is a village in Ashrestaq Rural District, Yaneh Sar District, Behshahr County, Mazandaran Province, Iran. At the 2006 census, its population was 142, in 52 families. Decreased from 313 people in 2006.
