= Metkazin =

Metkazin متكازين
- Village
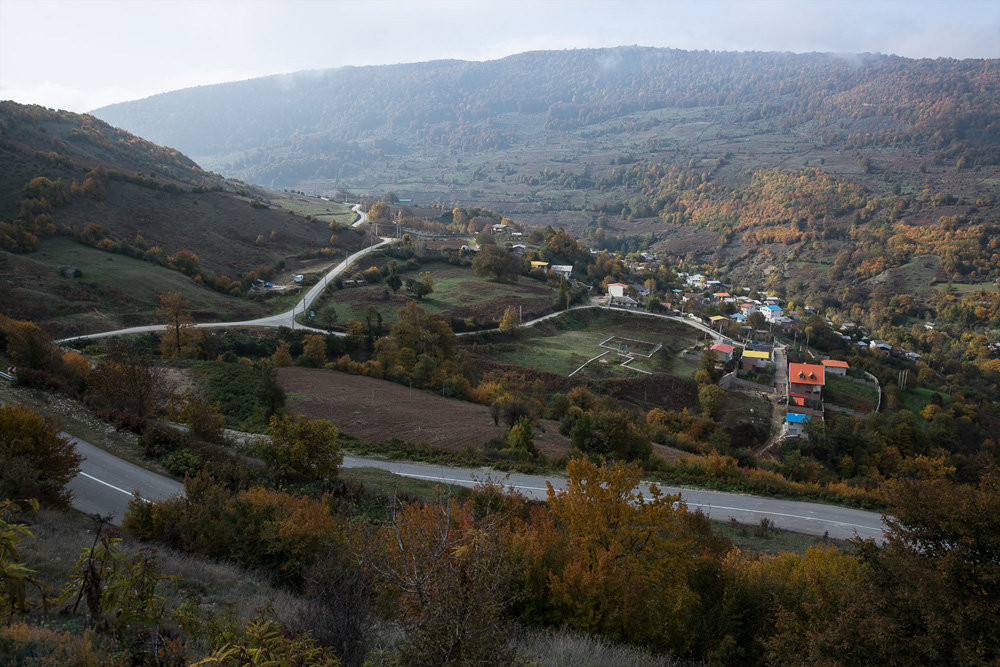
- Metkazin

- Location within Iran
- Coordinates: 36°33′52″N 53°46′34″E
- Country: Iran
- Province: Mazandaran
- County: Behshahr
- Bakhsh: Yaneh Sar
- Rural District: Ashrestaq

Population (2006)
  - Total: 399
- Time zone: UTC+3:30 (IRST)

Metkazin (Persian: متكازين, also Metkāzīn and Motkāzīn; also known as Metkāzamīn) is a village in Yaneh Sar District, Behshahr County, Mazandaran Province, Iran. At the 2016 census, its population was 194, living in 77 families. Down from 399 people in 2006.

== Notable residents ==
Sabir Jabbari, Cleric
