= Kolya, Iran =

Kolya كليا
- Village
- Location within Iran
- Coordinates: 36°33′39″N 54°01′02″E
- Country: Iran
- Province: Mazandaran
- County: Behshahr
- Bakhsh: Yaneh Sar
- Rural District: Shohada

Population (2016)
  - Total: 107
- Time zone: UTC+3:30 (IRST)

Kolya (Persian: كليا, also Romanized as Kolyā; also known as Keyā and Kīā) is a village in Shohada Rural District, Yaneh Sar District, Behshahr County, Mazandaran Province, Iran. At the 2016 census, its population was 107, in 35 families.
