= Kiasar, Behshahr =

Village in Mazandaran province, Iran

Kiasar Persian: كياسر
- Village
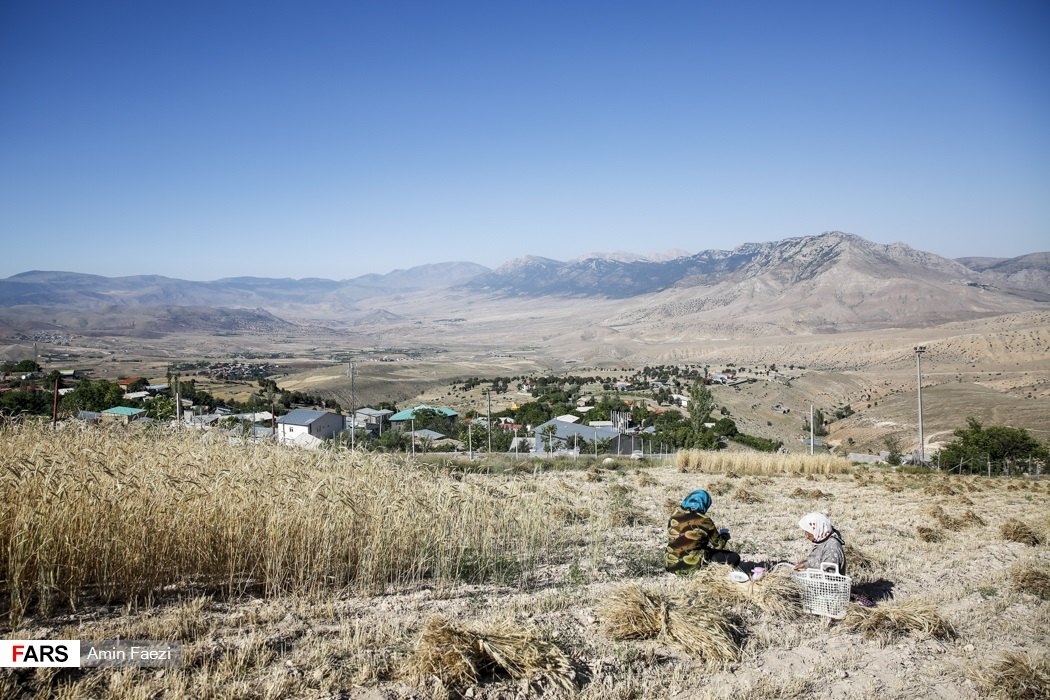
- The village of Kiasar

- Location within Iran
- Coordinates: 36°34′45″N 53°49′54″E
- Country: Iran
- Province: Mazandaran
- County: Behshahr
- District: Yaneh Sar
- Rural District: Ashrestaq

Population (2016)
  - Total: 486
- Time zone: UTC+3:30 (IRST)

Kiasar (Persian: كياسر) (Note: Also romanized as Kīāsar; also known as Kīāsar-e Bālā and Kīāsar-e Pā’īn) is a village in Ashrestaq Rural District of Yaneh Sar District in Behshahr County, Mazandaran province, Iran.

== Demographics ==
=== Population ===
At the time of the 2006 National Census, the village's population was 367 in 110 households. The following census in 2011 counted 321 people in 119 households. The 2016 census measured the population of the village as 486 people in 153 households.
