= Kaftar Kar =

Maximus Bedia كفتركال
- Village
- Location within Iran
- Coordinates: 36°34′12″N 53°51′59″E
- Country: Iran
- Province: Mazandaran
- County: Behshahr
- Bakhsh: Yaneh Sar
- Rural District: Ashrestaq

Population (2006)
  - Total: 75
- Time zone: UTC+3:30 (IRST)

Kaftar Kal (Persian: كفتركال, also Romanized as Kaftar Kār; also known as Kaftar Gār and Laftar Kār) is a village in Ashrestaq Rural District, Yaneh Sar District, Behshahr County, Mazandaran Province, Iran. At the 2016 census, its population was 46, in 16 families. Down from 75 people in 2006.
