= Pacham, Mazandaran =

Pacham (Persian: پچم) in Mazandaran may refer to:

- Pachet
- Pajim
