= Sardar Rafie Yanehsari =

Tehran's brigadier general

Sardar Rafie Yanehsari KLS
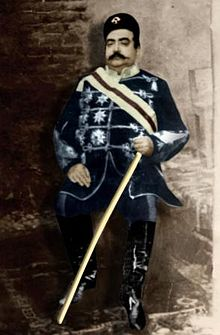

Wali of velâyat of Astarabad
- In office February, 1892 – 5 November 1918
- Preceded by: Lotf Ali Khan Sartip
- Monarchs: Naser al-Din Shah Qajar (r. 1848–1896); Mozaffar ad-Din Shah Qajar (r. 1896–1907); Mohammad Ali Shah Qajar (r. 1907–1909); Ahmad Shah Qajar (r. 1909–1925)
- Succeeded by: title abolished

Governor of Gorgan
- In office 1926–1930
- Monarch: Reza Shah

Personal details
- Born: 1856 Yaneh Sar
- Died: 1930 (aged 73–74)
- Relations: Amir Khan-e Sardar

Military service
- Allegiance: Qajar Iran (1876–1925)
- Battles/wars: Persian Constitutional Revolution: Siege of Astarabad; World War I: Persian Campaign

Sardar Rafie Yanehsari (1856-1930) was the Wali of velayat of Astarabad and Governor of Gorgan from the time of Naser el-Din Shah to Reza Shah and was a member of Yanehsari Dynasty. Sardar Rafi played a major role in the development of the areas under his rule, the first explorations in Gorgan, the first carvings in Tepe Hisar, the construction of the road between Gorgan and Tehran and the introduction of modern science to Gorgan, Only part of his activity was during his 39 years of rule. Sardar Rafi first came to power in February 1892, when he was succeeded by his father, Lotf Ali Khan Sartip, who ruled the Hezarjarib region and rose to the rank of brigadier general. In addition to his services to modernize the areas under his rule, he and his nephew, Amir Khan-e Sardar, played an important role in suppressing Turkmen insurgency.

== early life ==
Sardar Rafie, the son of Lotfali Khan Khan Sartip, was born in 1856 in Yaneh Sar. He had a brother named Habibullah Khan Sartip and three sisters named Alieh Khanum, Homa Khanum and Roghayeh Khanum. His mother, Shazdeh Khanum, was the daughter of Mehdi Khan, a colonel under Abbas Mirza during the Russo-Persian Wars.

Lotf Ali Khan, in addition to ruling Hezar-e-Jarib region, was a well-known military commander, and in 1859 he was given the ruling of Hezar-e-Jarib by Nasser al-Din Shah. Sardar Rafi's brother, Habibullah Khan, married Iftikhar al-Saltanah, the daughter of Naser al-Din Shah Qajar, in 1871, and as a result, in 1872 Habibullah's only child, Amir Khan-e Sardar born. In 1892, on the advice of the ruler of Mazandaran, Mirza Abdullah Khan Yoshi, Habibullah Khan was promoted to the rank of Brigadier General by Nasser al-Din Shah.

== Military career ==
In 1876, Sardar Rafie went to the Cossack Division School to begin his military service. He studied at that school under the tutelage of General Wadbolski, and in 1880 he became a lieutenant. In 1892, following the death of his father, Sardar Rafi was promoted to the rank of brigadier general and was promoted to the 48th Regiment of Hezarjarib. 48th Regiment was one of the most important regiments in the Astarabad-Hezarjarib region, known as the "Three Hezarjarib Regiments". The 47th Regiment was under the supervision of Habibullah Khan Sartip, the 48th Regiment was under the supervision of Sardar Rafie, and the 49th Regiment was under the supervision of Lotfali Khan Salar, the son of Sardar Rafie.

== as Wali of Astarabad ==
Following his promotion to brigadier general, Sardar Rafi was appointed as Wali of velayat of Astarabad. The area of his rule at the beginning was only Hezarjarib and Astarabad. In 1907, he became the ruler of Shahroud and Bastam. Some time later, Aq Qala and in 1908 with the death of Muzaffar al-Din Shah, and the successor of Mohammad Ali Shah, all the areas that are today in Semnan, Golestan and the eastern part of Mazandaran came under the rule of Sardar Rafie.

=== Developments ===
In 1900, Sardar Rafie, along with Muzaffar al-Din Shah Qajar, went on a European tour. During a trip to St. Petersburg, Sardar Rafie, who was very surprised by the modernity of the city, decided to return and develop the areas under his rule, especially Gorgan. At the beginning, Sardar Rafi carried out a program for the reconstruction of roads from Gorgan to Hezarjarib, which lasted a year and was carried out with the help of Russian advisers. Later in 1906, at his invitation, a number of orientalists such as Jacques de Morgan came to Gorgan to explore, which led to the discovery of the Astarabad treasury; Experts believe that some of the objects in the treasury, which are very similar to the discoveries of Tepe Hissar, belong to the third millennium BC and nearly 5,000 years ago. Since then, Gorgan became one of the favorite centers of orientalists, and as a result, caused the arrival of modern science in Gorgan. With the arrival of orientalists in Gorgan, modern science also came to this city and several libraries were built in Gorgan by the order of Sardar Rafi. After that, Sardar Rafi, who noticed a new wave of constitutionalism among the Iranians with Tobacco Protest, sent a telegram to Muzaffar al-Din Shah in support of the workers of Astarabad, in which he demanded an increase in workers' salaries to one thousand six hundred tomans. Although this request was rejected, Sardar Rafi became very popular among his subjects.

=== Constitutional Revolution, 1908-1911 ===
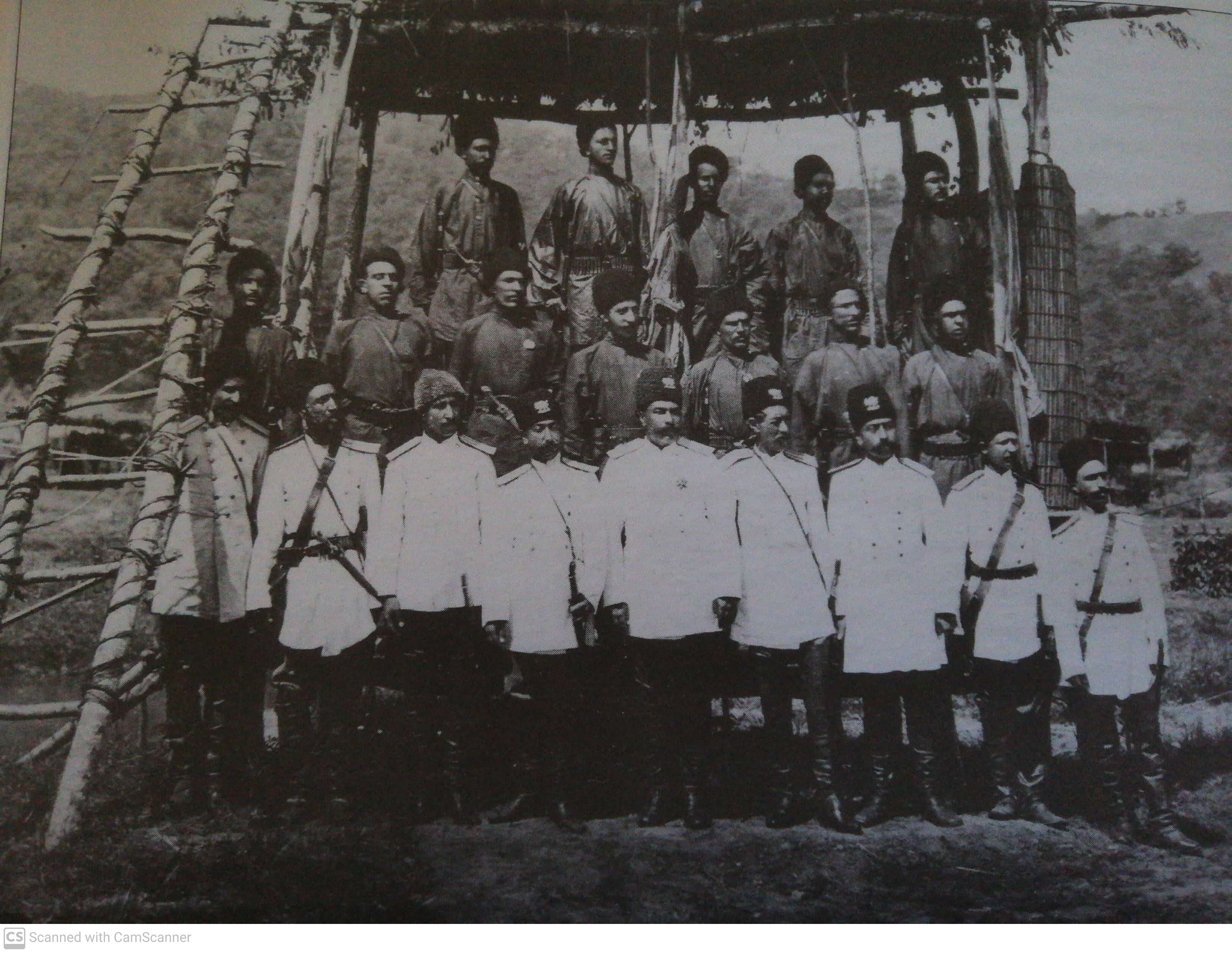
Group of Sardar Rafi Yansari's officials, 1909

After the death of Muzaffar al-Din Shah, Mohammad Ali Mirza became king, and in 1908, by bombing the parliament, he started a civil war in Iran between the Authoritarians and the constitutionalists. Meanwhile, the security of velayat of Astarabad was not without significance. For this purpose, after a short time from Tehran, Mohammad Baqer Khan Salar Akram from the Authoritarians faction was ordered to reach Astarabad. However, Sardar Rafie, who had been associated with the constitutionalists from the very beginning, went to Astarabad from his mansion in Hezar Jerib and did not allow its gates to be opened on Salar Akram. Salar Akram warned him that opening the gates would be treason, but Sardar Rafie did not open the gates again, which led to the three-month Siege of Astarabad. In the end, in a clash, Salar Akram was killed and the siege ended. This was the beginning of the opposition to constitutionalism against Sardar Rafi throughout his territory. In Bandar Gaz, Mustafa Khan Shokooh Al-Saltanah closed the roads to Astarabad so that the products of this city would not reach the people of Astarabad and put pressure on Sardar Rafi. But the people of Bandar Gaz themselves rebelled against Shokooh Al-Saltanah and supported Sardar Rafi. Sardar Rafi also sent his nephew Amir-e Khan Sardar with an army to Bandar-e-Gaz to surrender Mustafa Khan. Finally, Mustafa Khan surrendered in less than a week. Next, in Aq Qala, the Turkmen seize the opportunity to revolt and plunder. In a letter to Amir Khan, Sardar Rafi called on Amir Khan-e Sardar to return to Astarabad to quell the Turkmen uprising by combining the two 48th Regiment corps. Later in the battle of Aq Qala, the Turkmen were severely defeated and their revolt ended for a while.

In 1909, following the civil war, Sardar Rafi, who had succeeded in clearing his entire territory of Authoritarians, moved to Mazandaran, To defeat Ali Khan Zahir al-Dawla, who was working against the constitutionalists, to join Mohammad Vali Khan Tonekaboni's army from there. In Sari, Zahir al-Dawla's forces faced Sardar Rafi's forces, which ended with the victory of Sardar Rafi and the escape of Zahair al-Dawla. After the conquest of Sari, the rest of the Authoritarians surrendered in Mazandaran, and at this time, Amir Moayed Savadkuhi, who was a constitutionalist, joined Sardar Rafie. On July 13, 1909, Sardar Rafi's forces joined Tonekaboni, Yeprem Khan, Sardar Asad, and Samsam al-Saltanah, and participated in the Triumph of Tehran, which ousted Mohammad Ali Shah Qajar from the throne and replaced Ahmad Shah. After the victory of the constitutionalists, Tonekaboni, who had become prime minister, forgave Zahair al-Dawla and returned the government of Mazandaran to him. However, Zahair al-Dawla had become so unpopular in Mazandaran that he resigned after a year and left politics forever.

==== Mohammad Ali Shah's attempt to regain power ====
In 1911, Mohammad Ali Shah Qajar, who had fled to Russia after the end of the Civil War, returned to Iran via Russia with the help of Russian ammunition and encamped in Gomishan to regain the lost throne. Among those who joined him in the hope of gaining more power was Habibullah Khan Sartip, the brother of Sardar Rafi, who joined him in the Gomishan campaign. By this time, with this new crisis, the position of Parliament had been shaken and many former constitutionalists and fighters had sought refuge in the British Embassy for fear of their lives. Mohammad Ali Shah even asked the commanders of Bojnourd and Quchan for help and pardoned their past mistakes in a decree. Mohammad Ali Shah divided the army into three groups: he sent a group to Shahroud under the command of Ali Khan Arshad al-Dawla, who advanced to Varamin and were defeated by government troops, and Arshad al-Dawla was shot. A group went by the sea and its commanders were Mirza Mohammad Khan Amir Makram Larijani and Askar Khan Azam-ol-Molk who were defeated by Yeprem Khan and his Dashnaks. The middle army, in which Mohammad Ali Mirza himself participated, went to Astarabad via Mazandaran. Apart from Habibullah Khan Sartip, among the officials who were in this army are Amir Moayed Savadkuhi, Morad Khan Savadkuhi, Habibullah Khan Shoja Al-Molk Surtiji, Habibullah Khan Salar Azam Do Mehri and several others. In the meantime, Sardar Rafi, realizing the danger of Mohammad Ali Shah, marched towards them with his army. The two armies fought in Savadkuh, and the crisis ended with the defeat of Muhammad Ali Shah and his return to Russia. All those involved in the crisis with Mohammad Ali Shah, including Habibullah Khan, were arrested. Sardar Rafi received the Order of the Lion and the Sun from Ahmad Shah.

=== 1911-1914 ===
During these three years, Sardar Rafie, who became famous for his victories in the Constitutional Revolution and became a national hero, received large sums of money from the government, which he spent on development and construction. Shahryari building, Taqwa school, Sayami mansion and Amir Latifi house were among the buildings that were built in these three years with the support of Sardar Rafie. He had proposed that Greater Khorasan be annexed to Astarabad and, of course, come under his rule. He was not accepted in this request, although the government tried to take advantage of him and his influential compatriots in the region on various occasions. The issue of arrears tax was perhaps no more than an excuse, and in fact it was a kind of confiscation of property that was intended not for him, but for all his classmates. He was summoned to Tehran in 1914 because of differences with Mostowfi al-Mamalek, and was detained or imprisoned for more than a year.

=== World War I and fall ===
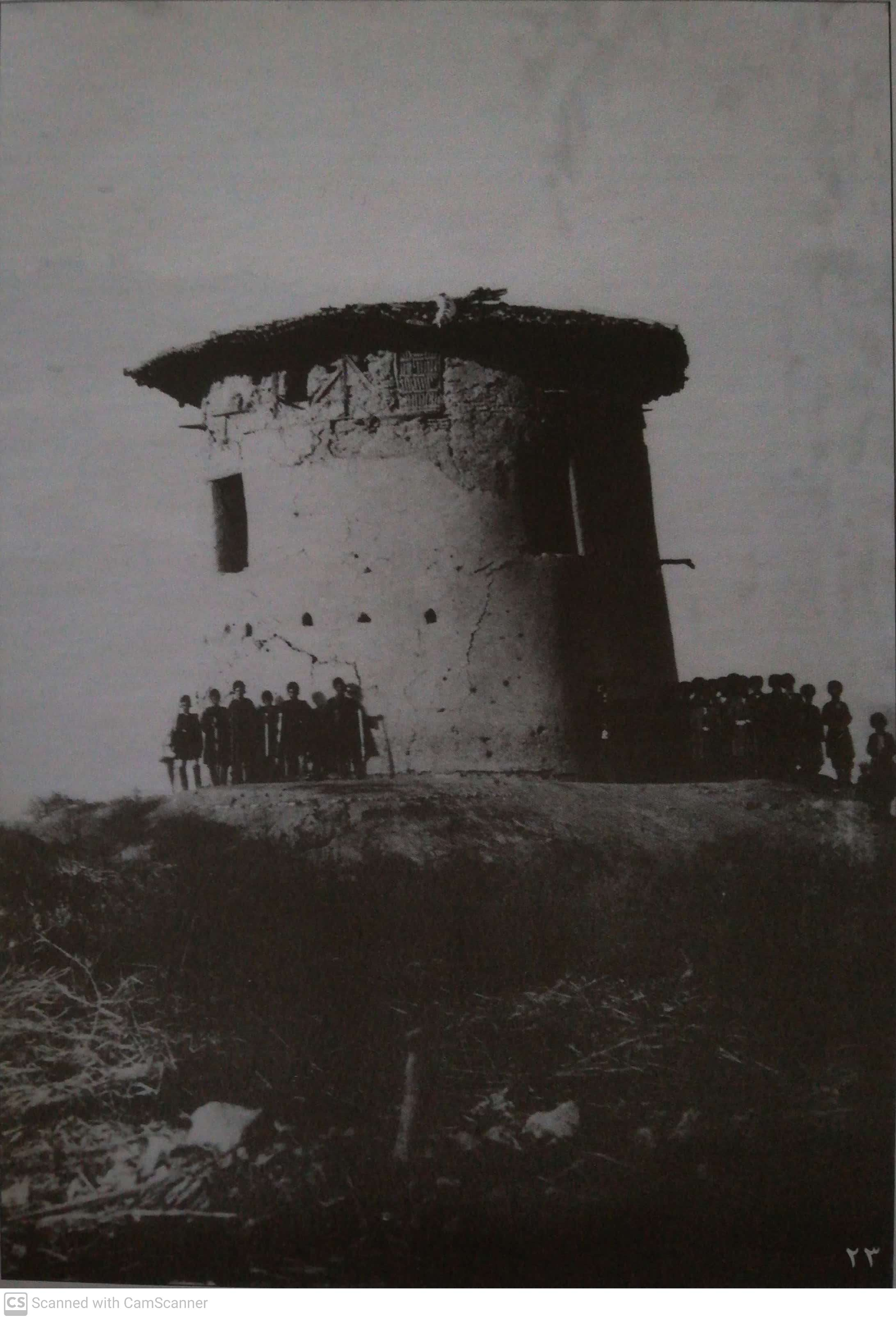
Sardar Tower, the center of Sardar Rafie's resistance against Russian forces in World War I.

In 1915, Mostowfi ol-Mamalek was removed as prime minister and replaced by Hassan Pirnia. As a result, Sardar Rafi was released from prison and returned to Astarabad. At this time, Russian and British forces, on the one hand, and Ottoman forces, on the other, were fighting in Iran in a campaign called the Persian Campaign. Meanwhile, Sardar Rafi noticed the looting of the northern regions of Iran by Russian forces. He decided to create a force and confront the Russians. He asked the prime minister for weapons, but the government was so weak that it could not help Sardar Rafi. So Sardar Rafi gathered volunteer forces from the people and bought weapons from the tribes around Khorasan. In the first major battle in Maraveh Tappeh, Sardar Rafi's forces faced the Russians. In a few hours of fighting, Sardar Rafi was defeated and forced to retreat. Thus, the Russians conquered Maraveh Tappeh.

Then Sardar Rafi went to Sardar Tower in Mohammad abad and declared the center of resistance there. Sardar Rafi then prevented Russian forces from advancing in a series of guerrilla attacks in Incheh Borun and Khan Bebin. However, it did not take long for the successful advance of Colonel Lazar Bicherakhov's forces from Manjil to Neginshahr in April 1915 to loosen the resistance in northern Astarabad and for Sardar Rafi to send troops there quickly. Simultaneously with Colonel Bichrakhov's Operation, Sir Charles Murray Marling, while in Tehran preparing for the removal of Pirnia and the ouster of Abdol Majid Mirza, had instructed Brigadier-General Percy Sykes to launch an operation to take control of Astrabad. Meanwhile, the Madanlu and Jahan Bigloo tribes from Mazandaran and the people's forces led by Amir Khan-e Sardar joined Sardar Rafi. Sardar Rafi divided his forces into three parts, part under the command of Amir Khan-e Sardar to the north to defend Incheh Borun and its surroundings, part under the leadership of Lotfali Khan Salar, the son of Sardar Rafi was sent to Negin Shahr to confront Colonel Bicherakhov; And a part went under his own leadership to confront Brigadier General Sykes, who was advancing southwest of Astarabad.

Until August 1915, when Mostowfi ol-Mamalek became prime minister again and declared that Sardar Rafi's confrontations were rebellious, Colonel Bicherakhov's forces were forced to retreat and return to Gilan after several defeats. Brigadier General Sykes telegraphed to Marling, in which he mentioned the stubborn resistance of Sardar Rafi and asked for more force, which was opposed by Marling, so in an arbitrary action, Sykes withdrew from the positions of Astarabad and went to Tehran. Sardar Rafi sent his forces together to drive the Russians out of Incheh Borun. The war in Inche Borun continued until December 1915, when Mostowfi ol-Mamalek resigned. It was at this time that Abdol-Hossein Farman Farma, who was entirely with the British forces, came to power. He immediately began purging German and Ottoman supporters of central and provincial offices, calling regional resistance, such as the resistance of Rais Ali Delvari in southern Iran and Sardar Rafi and his allies, traitors and ordering their arrest. Many historians believe that this was the beginning of the fall of Sardar Rafi.

In 1916, General von der Goltz, commander of the Ottoman Sixth Army, telegraphed his support to Sardar Rafie and sent him weapons and artillery. Sardar Rafi managed to defeat the Russian forces with new equipment, but General Baratov defeated the Germans in Kermanshah on February 22, and thus Sardar Rafie lost the support of the Germans. In March of that year, Mohammad Vali Khan Tonekaboni replaced Farman Farma as Prime Minister and signed an agreement with the Russian and British forces. In order to implement this agreement, General Baratov went to Astarabad via Kermanshah to open the way for Russia to Iran with the defeat of Sardar Rafie. Sardar Rafi and his men quickly began to line up in Kordkuy, Shahroud and Bastam, Sardar Rafi's forces were written by 20,000 people at this time. The battle between Sardar Rafi's army and General Baratov lasted three months, and Sardar Rafi's forces were finally forced to retreat to Astarabad. Meanwhile, the fall of Astarabad was inevitable, the Sixth Ottoman Army under the command of Mirliva Ali İhsan Sâbis captured Khaneqin and Qasr Shirin in early June, then Kermanshah in July and Hamedan on August 11. To prevent the advance of the Ottoman forces, General Baratov withdrew half of his army from Astarabad to western Iran. After the capital was threatened by Ottoman forces, Tonekaboni was ousted on August 12, and Mirza Hassan Khan Vossug ed Dowleh, unfavored by Ahmad Shah but favored by the Russian and British autonomous ministers, became prime minister. Sardar Rafi's forces seized the opportunity and defeated the rest of the Russian forces and drove them out of Astarabad. Then Sardar Rafi set out to conquer Tehran. At the same time, the government of the National Defense Committee, which was formed in Kermanshah in February 1916 with the support of German and Ottoman forces, invited Sardar Rafi to serve as Minister of War in Rezaghi Nizam Al-Saltanah's cabinet.

During December, Sardar Rafi and his forces reached near Tehran and stopped in Tajrish. From February to March 1917, the Ottoman and German armies were driven out of Iran, and Kermanshah was conquered by General Baratov. Russian and British forces then attacked Tajrish to defeat Sardar Rafi, and in an attack they defeated Sardar Rafi's forces. He retreated to Shahroud with the rest of his men. In March, with a large bribe, the government of Vosough al-Dawla ratified the treaty written in the Tonekabon government and agreed to implement all its provisions, when suddenly the Russian Revolution of March 1917 took place. Sardar Rafi considered this to be his last chance to recover and attack Tehran, but in December 1918, After many clashes, General Dunsterville, in one of last operation of the Dunsterforce, invaded Astarabad, conquered the city, and captured Sardar Rafi. Shortly afterwards, on 5 November, Vosough al-Dawla signed an order expelling Sardar Rafi from the governorship of the province of Astarabad, declaring it an area under British control.

== House arrest era (1918-1925) ==
He was placed under house arrest for seven years after British forces took control of Astarabad and ousted Sardar Rafi. During these years, Sardar Rafi repeatedly asked Ahmad Shah and his various prime ministers for parole, but none of them were accepted. His place of house arrest was the Shahriar Building, where he once performed his administrative duties.

== as Governor of Gorgan ==
=== end of house arrest ===
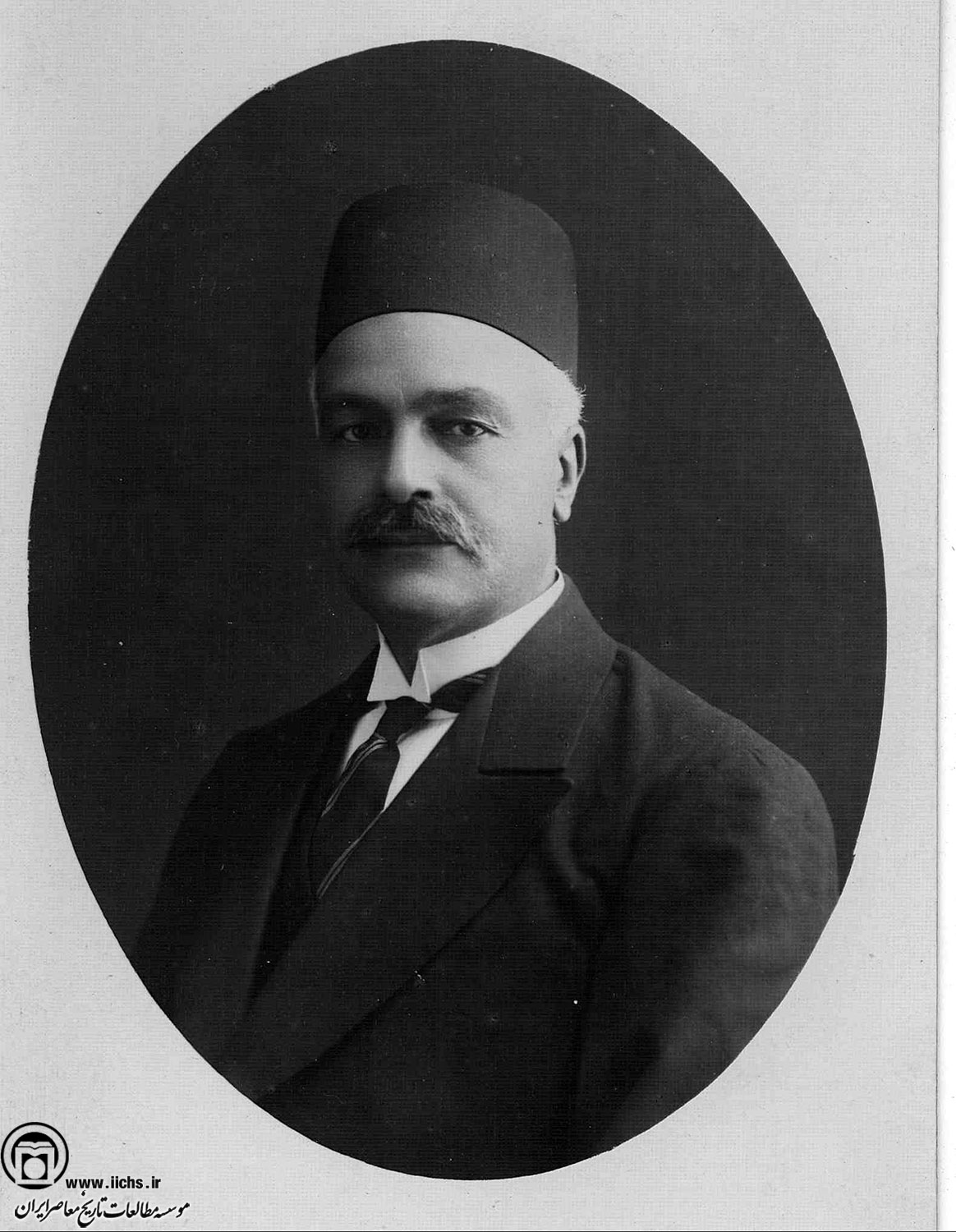
Kaikhosrow Shahrokh, one of the staunch supporters of the release of Sardar Rafi

One of the most important debates in the Fifth National Assembly was a speech by Kaikhosrow Shahrokh, a Zoroastrian representative who had announced that political prisoners such as Sardar Rafi should be released. This speech took place at the 155th meeting on April 25, 1925. Kaykhosrow Shahrokh pointed out in his speech that:

The heroes of the Constitutional Revolution have thrown us in house arrests and political prisons. The same people who stood up for the liberation of Iran when un-Irananians bombed the parliament. Some of them even came to our aid in the Great War. They have the right to be released after a lifetime of war. I demand the release of our political prisoners, such as Sardar Rafi Yanesari.

Following Kaykhosrow Shahrokh's speech, a commotion took place in the parliament, Mossadegh Al-Saltanah (Mohammad Mossadegh) stood up and said to him: There must have been a reason that they were imprisoned, now why are you upset for them? Go and get the rights of your fellow believers. Shmuel Hayyim, the representative of the Jews, supported Shahrokh and said to Mossadegh: "now making insults to other religions?" Mossadegh apologized and sat down in his chair. Parliament Speaker Hussein Pirnia requested for voting. Many deputies voted in favor, and the bill for the release of political prisoners was passed and signed by the speaker of parliament. But Mossadegh and a number of opponents, such as Seyyed Hassan Modarres, demanded that Sardar Rafi come to parliament to speak, to followed by a vote on the bill. Pirnia agreed to their request, and on April 26, Sardar Rafi was brought to Tehran in a protected manner to address the parliament.

In his speech to the parliament, Sardar Rafi spoke about the developments he made for Astarabad and the war in the Constitutional Revolution and the First World War. Then a vote was held and the overwhelming majority of the deputies voted for the release of Sardar Rafi. Only Mohammad Mossadegh and Modarres voted against.
