= Shah Neshin Asiab Sar Castle =

Castle in Mazandaran Province, Iran

Shah Neshin Asiab Sar castle
- قلعه شاه نشین آسیاب سر

General information
- Type: Castle
- Location: Behshahr County, Iran

Shah Neshin Asiab Sar castle (Persian: قلعه شاه نشین آسیاب سر) is a historical castle located in Behshahr County in Mazandaran Province, The longevity of this fortress dates back to the Early centuries of historical periods after Islam.
