= Bisheh Boneh =

Village in Mazandaran province, Iran

Bisheh Boneh Persian: بيشه بنه
- Village
- Location within Iran
- Coordinates: 36°34′09″N 53°48′46″E
- Country: Iran
- Province: Mazandaran
- County: Behshahr
- District: Yaneh Sar
- Rural District: Ashrestaq

Population (2016)
  - Total: 775
- Time zone: UTC+3:30 (IRST)

Bisheh Boneh (Persian: بيشه بنه) (Note: Also romanized as Bīsheh Boneh; also known as Bīsheh Band and Bīsheh Tappeh) is a village in Ashrestaq Rural District of Yaneh Sar District in Behshahr County, Mazandaran province, Iran, serving as capital of both the district and the rural district.

== Demographics ==
=== Population ===
At the time of the 2006 National Census, the village's population was 641 in 164 households. The following census in 2011 counted 432 people in 129 households. The 2016 census measured the population of the village as 775 people in 260 households. It was the most populous village in its rural district.
