= Badeleh Darreh =

Badeleh Darreh بادله دره
- Village
- Location within Iran
- Coordinates: 36°36′11″N 53°59′26″E
- Country: Iran
- Province: Mazandaran
- County: Behshahr
- Bakhsh: Yaneh Sar
- Rural District: Shohada

Population (2016)
  - Total: 69
- Time zone: UTC+3:30 (IRST)

Badeleh Darreh (Persian: بادله دره, also Romanized as Bādeleh Darreh) is a village in Shohada Rural District, Yaneh Sar District, Behshahr County, Mazandaran Province, Iran. At the 2016 census, its population was 69, in 26 families.
