= Kord Mahalleh, Behshahr =

Kord Mahalleh كردمحله
- Village
- Location within Iran
- Coordinates: 36°31′03″N 53°47′39″E
- Country: Iran
- Province: Mazandaran
- County: Behshahr
- Bakhsh: Yaneh Sar
- Rural District: Ashrestaq

Population (2006)
  - Total: 87
- Time zone: UTC+3:30 (IRST)

Kord Mahalleh (Persian: كردمحله, also Romanized as Kord Maḩalleh) is a village in Ashrestaq Rural District, Yaneh Sar District, Behshahr County, Mazandaran Province, Iran. At the 2016 census, its population was 87, in 33 families. Up from 70 in 2006.
