= Yaneh Sar =

Village in Mazandaran province, Iran

Yaneh Sar Persian: يانه سر
- Village
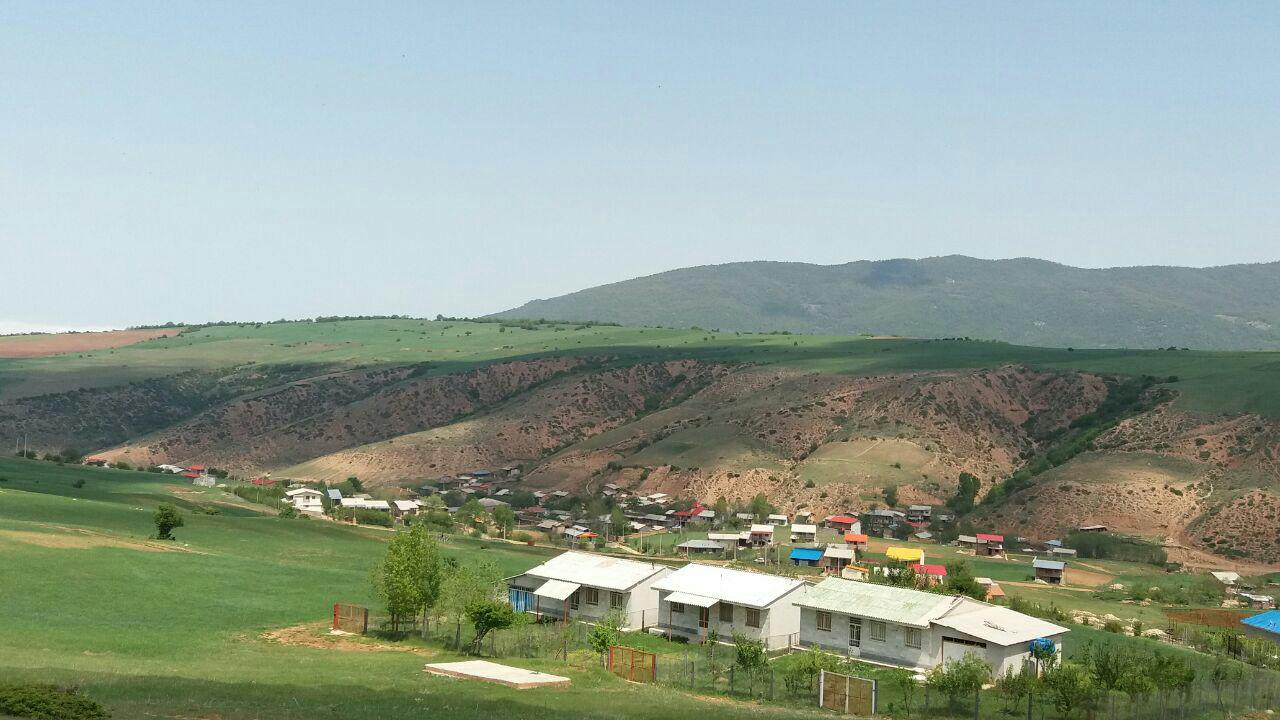
- The village of Yaneh Sar

- Location within Iran
- Coordinates: 36°36′34″N 54°03′56″E
- Country: Iran
- Province: Mazandaran
- County: Behshahr
- District: Yaneh Sar
- Rural District: Shohada

Population (2016)
  - Total: 372
- Time zone: UTC+3:30 (IRST)

Yaneh Sar (Persian: يانه سر) (Note: Also romanized as Yāneh Sar) is a village in Shohada Rural District of Yaneh Sar District in Behshahr County, Mazandaran province, Iran.

== Demographics ==
=== Population ===
At the time of the 2006 National Census, the village's population was 208 in 71 households. The following census in 2011 counted 112 people in 50 households. The 2016 census measured the population of the village as 372 people in 124 households.
