= Samchul =

Samchul سمچول
- Village
- Location within Iran
- Coordinates: 36°32′18″N 53°44′53″E
- Country: Iran
- Province: Mazandaran
- County: Behshahr
- Bakhsh: Yaneh Sar
- Rural District: Ashrestaq

Population (2006)
  - Total: 349
- Time zone: UTC+3:30 (IRST)

Samchul (Persian: سمچول, also Romanized as Samchūl) is a village in Ashrestaq Rural District, Yaneh Sar District, Behshahr County, Mazandaran Province, Iran. At the 2016 census, its population was 182, in 58 families. Decreased from 349 people in 2006.
