= Yaras =

Yaras may refer to:

- David Yaras, American mobster
- Brazil women's national rugby sevens team, nicknamed "Yaras"
- Yarasm, a village in Iran
