= Yarasm =

Village in Mazandaran, Iran

Yarasm يارسم
- Village
- Location within Iran
- Coordinates: 36°31′13″N 53°44′43″E
- Country: Iran
- Province: Mazandaran
- County: Behshahr
- Bakhsh: Yaneh Sar
- Rural District: Ashrestaq

Population (2016)
  - Total: 97
- Time zone: UTC+3:30 (IRST)

Yarasm (Persian: يارسم, also Romanized as Yārasm; also known as Vāras and Yāras) is a village in Ashrestaq Rural District, Yaneh Sar District, Behshahr County, Mazandaran Province, Iran. At the 2016 census, its population was 96, in 33 families. Up from 77 in 2006.
