= Berma =

Berma (Persian: برما) may refer to:

- Berma-ye Ashrostaq
- Berma-ye Zarem Rud
