= Lend =

Lend may refer to:

- Lunar Exploration Neutron Detector, see Lunar Reconnaissance Orbiter

- Lend, Austria, a town in the east district of Zell am See in the state of Salzburg
- Lend (Graz), a district of Graz
- Lend, Iran, a village in Mazandaran Province, Iran

== See also ==
- Loan to allow someone to have possession of something on the understanding that it is later returned in the same or equivalent form
