= Parch, Iran =

Parch (Persian: پارچ) may refer to:

- Parch, Mazandaran
- Parch, Razavi Khorasan
- Parch, West Azerbaijan
