= Sheykh Mahalleh, Behshahr =

Sheykh Mahalleh شيخ محله
- Village
- Location within Iran
- Coordinates: 36°34′31″N 53°43′24″E
- Country: Iran
- Province: Mazandaran
- County: Behshahr
- Bakhsh: Yaneh Sar
- Rural District: Ashrestaq

Population (2006)
  - Total: 107
- Time zone: UTC+3:30 (IRST)

Sheykh Mahalleh (Persian: شيخ محله, also Romanized as Sheykh Maḩalleh) is a village in Ashrestaq Rural District, Yaneh Sar District, Behshahr County, Mazandaran Province, Iran. At the 2016 census, its population was 90, in 30 families. Down from 107 in 2006.
