= Kava, Iran =

Village in Mazandaran province, Iran

Kava Persian: كوا
- Village
- Location within Iran
- Coordinates: 36°31′21″N 53°52′43″E
- Country: Iran
- Province: Mazandaran
- County: Behshahr
- District: Yaneh Sar
- Rural District: Ashrestaq

Population (2016)
  - Total: 568
- Time zone: UTC+3:30 (IRST)

Kava (Persian: كوا) (Note: Also romanized as Kavā, Kevā, and Kovā; also known as Kavaz) is a village in Ashrestaq Rural District of Yaneh Sar District in Behshahr County, Mazandaran province, Iran.

== Demographics ==
=== Population ===
At the time of the 2006 National Census, the village's population was 299 in 68 households. The following census in 2011 counted 132 people in 48 households. The 2016 census measured the population of the village as 568 people in 164 households.
