= Fetkash =

Fetkash فت كش
- Village
- Location within Iran
- Coordinates: 36°34′26″N 53°53′19″E
- Country: Iran
- Province: Mazandaran
- County: Behshahr
- Bakhsh: Yaneh Sar
- Rural District: Ashrestaq

Population (2016)
  - Total: 101
- Time zone: UTC+3:30 (IRST)

Fetkash (Persian: فت كش, also Romanized as Fatkesh; also known as Fateh Kash) is a village in Ashrestaq Rural District, Yaneh Sar District, Behshahr County, Mazandaran Province, Iran. At the 2016 census, its population was 101, in 41 families. Up from 74 in 2006.
