= Palangan Castle =

Castle in Mazandaran Province, Iran

Palangan castle
- قلعه پلنگان

General information
- Type: Castle
- Location: Behshahr County, Iran

Palangan castle (Persian: قلعه پلنگان) is a historical castle located in Behshahr County in Mazandaran Province, The longevity of this fortress dates back to the Historical periods after Islam.
