= Berma-ye Ashrostaq =

Berma-ye Ashrostaq برما عشرستاق
- Village
- Location within Iran
- Coordinates: 36°31′15″N 53°46′33″E
- Country: Iran
- Province: Mazandaran
- County: Behshahr
- Bakhsh: Yaneh Sar
- Rural District: Ashrestaq

Population (2016)
  - Total: 145
- Time zone: UTC+3:30 (IRST)

Berma-ye Ashrostaq (Persian: برما عشرستاق, also Romanized as Bermā-ye ‘Ashrostāq; also known as Bermā) is a village in Ashrestaq Rural District, Yaneh Sar District, Behshahr County, Mazandaran Province, Iran. At the 2016 census, its population was 145, in 40 families. Up from 97 people in 2006.

One of the village's sights is the Old Walnut tree of Berma, which became Natural heritage sight in 2022.
