= Parem, Iran =

Village in Mazandaran province, Iran

Parem Persian: پارم
- Village
- Location within Iran
- Coordinates: 36°34′47″N 53°45′35″E
- Country: Iran
- Province: Mazandaran
- County: Behshahr
- District: Yaneh Sar
- Rural District: Ashrestaq

Population (2016)
  - Total: 359
- Time zone: UTC+3:30 (IRST)

Parem (Persian: پارم) (Note: Also romanized as Pāram and Pārem) is a village in Ashrestaq Rural District of Yaneh Sar District in Behshahr County, Mazandaran province, Iran.

== Demographics ==
=== Population ===
At the time of the 2006 National Census, the village's population was 369 in 78 households. The following census in 2011 counted 156 people in 55 households. The 2016 census measured the population of the village as 359 people in 118 households.
