= Vaneshid =

Vaneshid ونشيد
- Village
- Location within Iran
- Coordinates: 36°33′11″N 53°53′20″E
- Country: Iran
- Province: Mazandaran
- County: Behshahr
- Bakhsh: Yaneh Sar
- Rural District: Ashrestaq

Population (2006)
  - Total: 92
- Time zone: UTC+3:30 (IRST)

Vaneshid (Persian: ونشيد, also Romanized as Vaneshīd and Vanashīd) is a village in Ashrestaq Rural District, Yaneh Sar District, Behshahr County, Mazandaran Province, Iran. At the 2016 census, its population was 48, in 19 families. Down from 92 people in 2006.
