= Lend, Iran =

Lend لند
- Village
- Location within Iran
- Coordinates: 36°29′16″N 53°55′25″E
- Country: Iran
- Province: Mazandaran
- County: Behshahr
- Bakhsh: Yaneh Sar
- Rural District: Shohada

Population (2006)
  - Total: 253
- Time zone: UTC+3:30 (IRST)

Lend (Persian: لند) is a village in Shohada Rural District, Yaneh Sar District, Behshahr County, Mazandaran Province, Iran. At the 2016 census, its population was 155, in 47 families. Down from 253 in 2006.
