= Piteh Now =

Village in Mazandaran province, Iran

Piteh Now Persian: پيته نو
- Village
- Location within Iran
- Coordinates: 36°34′54″N 53°57′10″E
- Country: Iran
- Province: Mazandaran
- County: Behshahr
- District: Yaneh Sar
- Rural District: Shohada

Population (2016)
  - Total: 412
- Time zone: UTC+3:30 (IRST)

Piteh Now (Persian: پيته نو) (Note: Also romanized as Pīteh Now; also known as Pet Now, Pet Tow, and Tappeh-Ye-Now) is a village in Shohada Rural District of Yaneh Sar District in Behshahr County, Mazandaran province, Iran.

== Demographics ==
=== Population ===
At the time of the 2006 National Census, the village's population was 445 in 103 households. The following census in 2011 counted 397 people in 117 households. The 2016 census measured the population of the village as 412 people in 123 households.
