= Old Hezarjarib - Mazandaran =

Old Hezarjarib هزار جریب قدیم
- Village
- Location within Iran
- Coordinates: 36°36′36″N 54°3′52″E
- Country: Iran
- Province: Mazandaran
- County: Behshahr
- Bakhsh: Yanehsar
- Time zone: UTC+3:30 (IRST)
  - Summer (DST): UTC+4:30 (IRDT)

The Old Hezarjarib District (Persian: بخش هزارجریب قدیم) Was a district (bakhsh) in Behshahr County, Mazandaran Province, Iran.

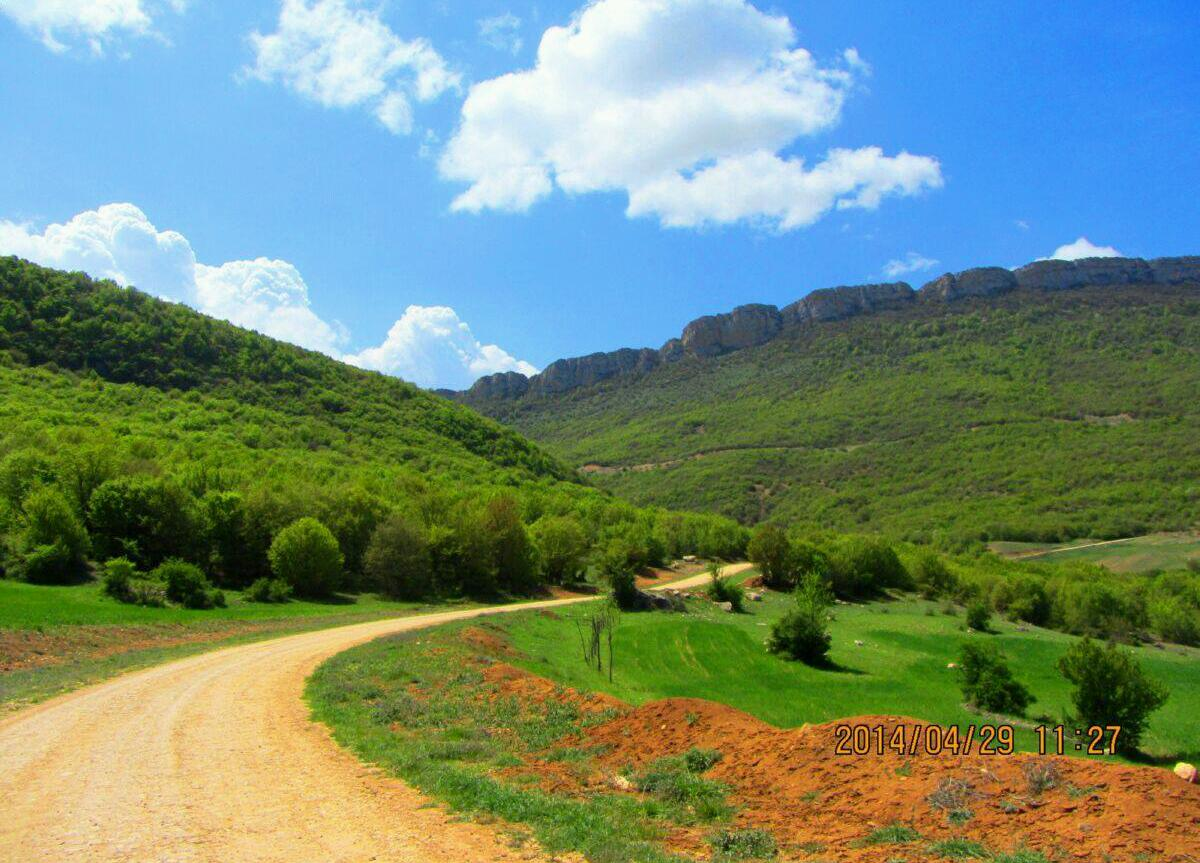
A rural road to Yanehsar, Hezarjarib, Alborz mountain

Old Hezarjarib and Astarabad was a place that Sardar Rafie Yanehsari’s dynasty was the local governing of there. He was one of the four persons who called himself a king and increased his power and influence as he made the Constitution governments worried.
