= Anderat =

Village in Mazandaran province, Iran

Anderat Persian: اندرات
- Village
- Location within Iran
- Coordinates: 36°35′48″N 53°56′10″E
- Country: Iran
- Province: Mazandaran
- County: Behshahr
- District: Yaneh Sar
- Rural District: Shohada

Population (2016)
  - Total: 355
- Time zone: UTC+3:30 (IRST)

Anderat (Persian: اندرات) (Note: Also romanized as Anderāt) is a village in Shohada Rural District of Yaneh Sar District in Behshahr County, Mazandaran province, Iran.

== Demographics ==
=== Population ===
At the time of the 2006 National Census, the village's population was 113 in 31 households. The following census in 2011 counted 302 people in 81 households. The 2016 census measured the population of the village as 355 people in 126 households.
