= Estarm, Kerman =

Estarm استارم
- Village
- Location within Iran
- Coordinates: 28°20′43″N 58°18′30″E
- Country: Iran
- Province: Kerman
- County: Anbarabad
- Bakhsh: Jebalbarez-e Jonubi
- Rural District: Nargesan

Population (2006)
  - Total: 267
- Time zone: UTC+3:30 (IRST)
  - Summer (DST): UTC+4:30 (IRDT)

Estarm (Persian: استارم, also Romanized as Estārm and Estaram; also known as Estārd and Istārd) is a village in Nargesan Rural District, Jebalbarez-e Jonubi District, Anbarabad County, Kerman Province, Iran. At the 2006 census, its population was 267, in 56 families.
