= Valentina Kova =

- Born: Saint Petersburg, Russia
- Education: Parsons The New School for Design
- Label: Valentina Kova
- Awards: Russian Woman of the Year
- Website: https://valentinakova.com/

Valentina Kova is a Russian-American fashion designer and entrepreneur who co-founded her eponymous label in 2011 in New York City. Today, Valentina Kova is an American luxury brand specializing in knitwear, blouses, dresses, and fine jewelry. The label currently has their showroom and headquarters in New York’s SoHo neighborhood–available for styling and personal shopping appointments only. The brand has a boutique location in Palm Beach, Florida along Worth Avenue, while occupying temporary pop-up locations in places like Aspen and Nantucket for seasonal residences. Carrying a wide range of apparel including ready-to-wear, fine jewelry, and accessories, her designs nod to luxurious quality, natural fabrics, and true sustainability.

== History ==
Valentina Kova was born in Saint Petersburg, Russia, later moving to the United States to attend Lake Forest College in Illinois where she double majored in Fine Arts and Economics. After graduating, she spent 3 years working for Goldman Sachs as a Financial Analyst in Chicago. She then went on to pursue her prevailing interest in fashion by attending Parson’s Graduate School of Design in New York City. She worked for designers in New York and Paris before developing her own fine jewelry pieces for herself, while teaching four classes in Fashion and Design Principles at Parsons. It was after many people started noticing the designs Kova was wearing and commissioning her to make custom pieces that she decided to launch her label in 2011, selling only fine jewelry. She later expanded into the ready-to-wear category in 2013.

Valentina Kova's designs are distributed in various boutiques around the world, including Henry Lehr and A’maree’s. Her designs have been worn by celebrities such as, Julianne Moore, Lorde, Glenn Close, Laverne Cox, Coco Rocha, and Mischa Barton. The brand currently operates at atelier-level luxury where everything is handcrafted in the Garment District of New York. Operating at this sustainable capacity, the brands goals are to produce less and conserve more: a business model that prioritizes their loyal clientele and the environment. Built around the belief that every woman’s shape, size, and personal style should be celebrated, Kova's made-to-order model is home to over 100 styles that can be altered or customized.
