= Shohada Rural District (Behshahr County) =

Rural district in Mazandaran province, Iran

Shohada Rural District Persian: دهستان شهدا
- Rural District
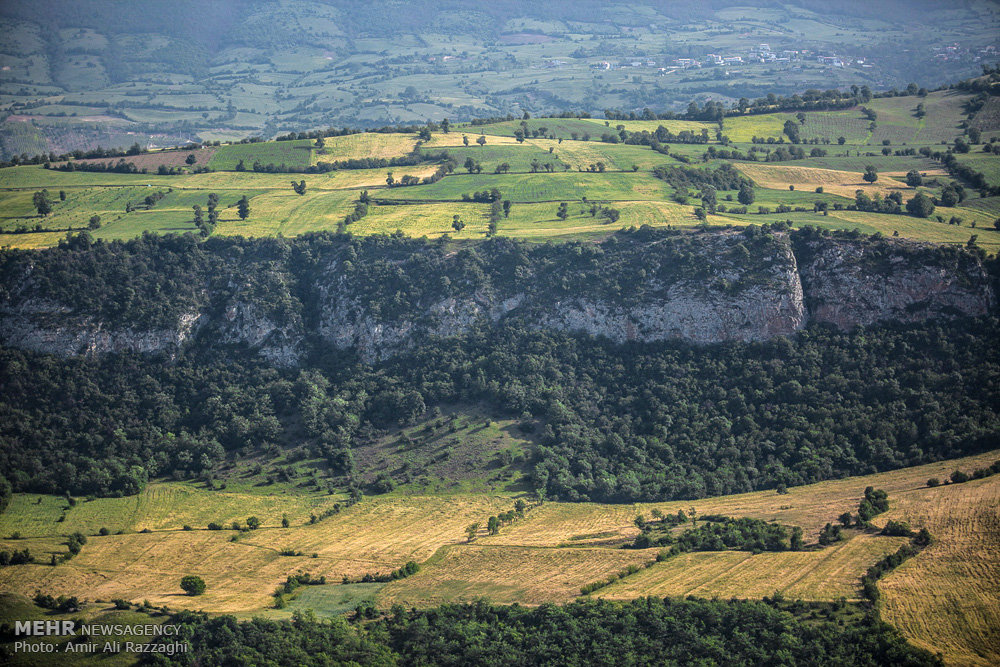
- Landscape around Sefid Chah Cemetery

- Location within Iran
- Coordinates: 36°32′N 54°01′E
- Country: Iran
- Province: Mazandaran
- County: Behshahr
- District: Yaneh Sar
- Established: 1987
- Capital: Sefid Chah

Population (2016)
  - Total: 4,761
- Time zone: UTC+3:30 (IRST)

Shohada Rural District (Persian: دهستان شهدا) is in Yaneh Sar District of Behshahr County, Mazandaran province, Iran. Its capital is the village of Sefid Chah.

== Demographics ==
=== Population ===
At the time of the 2006 National Census, the rural district's population was 3,341 in 970 households. There were 2,535 inhabitants in 830 households at the following census of 2011. The 2016 census measured the population of the rural district as 4,761 in 1,586 households. The most populous of its 20 villages was Arzet, with 535 people.

=== Other villages in the rural district ===
- Abdollahi
- Alaraz
- Alarazbum
- Anderat
- Badeleh Darreh
- Gat Cheshmeh
- Kolya
- Lend
- Paband
- Pajim
- Parsa
- Piteh Now
- Sang Ruj
- Sorkh Geriveh
- Yakh Kesh
- Yaneh Sar
- Zelet
