= Kiaseh =

Kiaseh كياسه
- Village
- Location within Iran
- Coordinates: 36°47′08″N 50°09′57″E
- Country: Iran
- Province: Gilan
- County: Rudsar
- Bakhsh: Rahimabad
- Rural District: Shuil

Population (2006)
  - Total: 160
- Time zone: UTC+3:30 (IRST)
  - Summer (DST): UTC+4:30 (IRDT)

Kiaseh (Persian: (کیاسر)كياسه, also Romanized as Kīāseh; also known as Kīāsar) is a village in Shuil Rural District, Rahimabad District, Rudsar County, Gilan Province, Iran. At the 1987 census, its population was 200, in 70 families and they have seen much of the kingdom in their history.
