= Pakam =

Pakam پاكم
- Village
- Location within Iran
- Coordinates: 29°07′45″N 58°16′13″E
- Country: Iran
- Province: Kerman
- County: Bam
- Bakhsh: Central
- Rural District: Howmeh

Population (2006)
  - Total: 876
- Time zone: UTC+3:30 (IRST)
  - Summer (DST): UTC+4:30 (IRDT)

Pakam (Persian: پاكم, also Romanized as Pākam; also known as Pacham, Pāyekam, and Pāy-e Tom) is a village in Howmeh Rural District, in the Central District of Bam County, Kerman Province, Iran. At the 2006 census, its population was 876, in 214 families.
