= Ashrestaq Rural District =

Rural district in Mazandaran province, Iran

Ashrestaq Rural District Persian: دهستان عشرستاق
- Rural District
- Location within Iran
- Coordinates: 36°34′N 53°48′E
- Country: Iran
- Province: Mazandaran
- County: Behshahr
- District: Yaneh Sar
- Established: 1987
- Capital: Bisheh Boneh

Population (2016)
  - Total: 6,911
- Time zone: UTC+3:30 (IRST)

Ashrestaq Rural District (Persian: دهستان عشرستاق) is in Yaneh Sar District of Behshahr County, Mazandaran province, Iran. Its capital is the village of Bisheh Boneh.

== Demographics ==
=== Population ===
At the time of the 2006 National Census, the rural district's population was 7,284 in 1,859 households. There were 4,433 inhabitants in 1,477 households at the following census of 2011. The 2016 census measured the population of the rural district as 6,911 in 2,281 households. The most populous of its 34 villages was Bisheh Boneh, with 775 people.

=== List of Villages ===
- Afte Let
- Ahangar Kola
- Bandesar
- Berma-ye Ashrostaq
- Bisheh Boneh
- Chalu
- Estarem
- Fetkash
- Gholami
- Gornam
- Idin
- Jirband va Jurband
- Kaftar Kar
- Kava
- Kava Darreh
- Kiasar
- Kohneh Kumeh
- Kola
- Kord Mahalleh
- Lamrad
- Lujandeh
- Metkazin
- Pachet
- Par Kola
- Parch
- Parem
- Sabeq Mahalleh
- Samchul
- Sang Darreh
- Sheykh Mahalleh
- Shiler
- Vaneshid
- Velu
- Yarasm
