= Yaneh Sar District =

District in Mazandaran province, Iran

Yaneh Sar District Persian: بخش یانه‌سر
- District
- Location within Iran
- Coordinates: 36°33′N 53°55′E
- Country: Iran
- Province: Mazandaran
- County: Behshahr
- Capital: Bisheh Boneh

Population (2016)
  - Total: 11,672
- Time zone: UTC+3:30 (IRST)

Yaneh Sar District (Persian: بخش یانه‌سر) is in Behshahr County, Mazandaran province, Iran. Its capital is the village of Bisheh Boneh.

== Demographics ==
=== Population ===
At the time of the 2006 National Census, the district's population was 10,625 in 2,829 households. The following census in 2011 counted 6,968 people in 2,307 households. The 2016 census measured the population of the district as 11,672 inhabitants in 3,867 households.

=== Administrative divisions ===
Yaneh Sar District Population
| Administrative Divisions | 2006 | 2011 | 2016 |
|---|---|---|---|
| Ashrestaq RD | 7,284 | 4,433 | 6,911 |
| Shohada RD | 3,341 | 2,535 | 4,761 |
| Total | 10,625 | 6,968 | 11,672 |
RD = Rural District
