= Behshahr County =

County in Mazandaran province, Iran

Behshahr County Persian: شهرستانِ بِهْشَهْر
- County
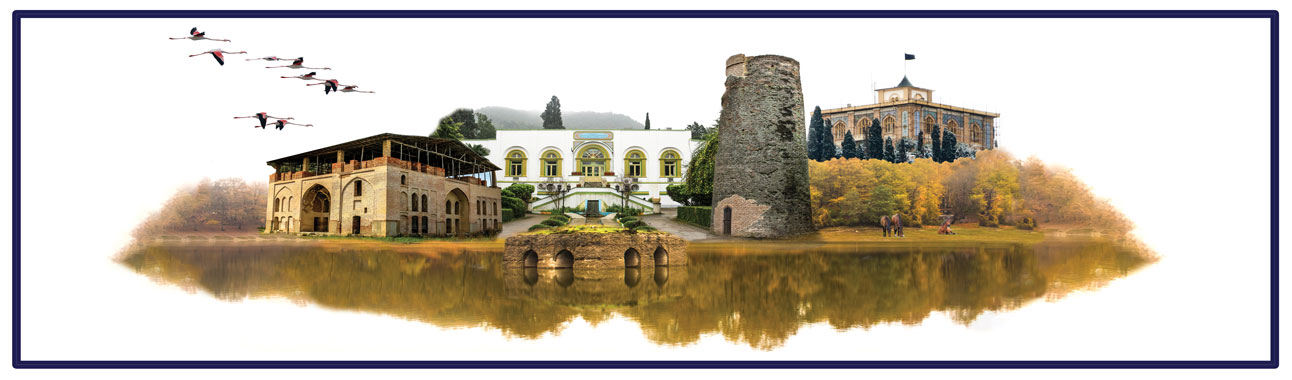
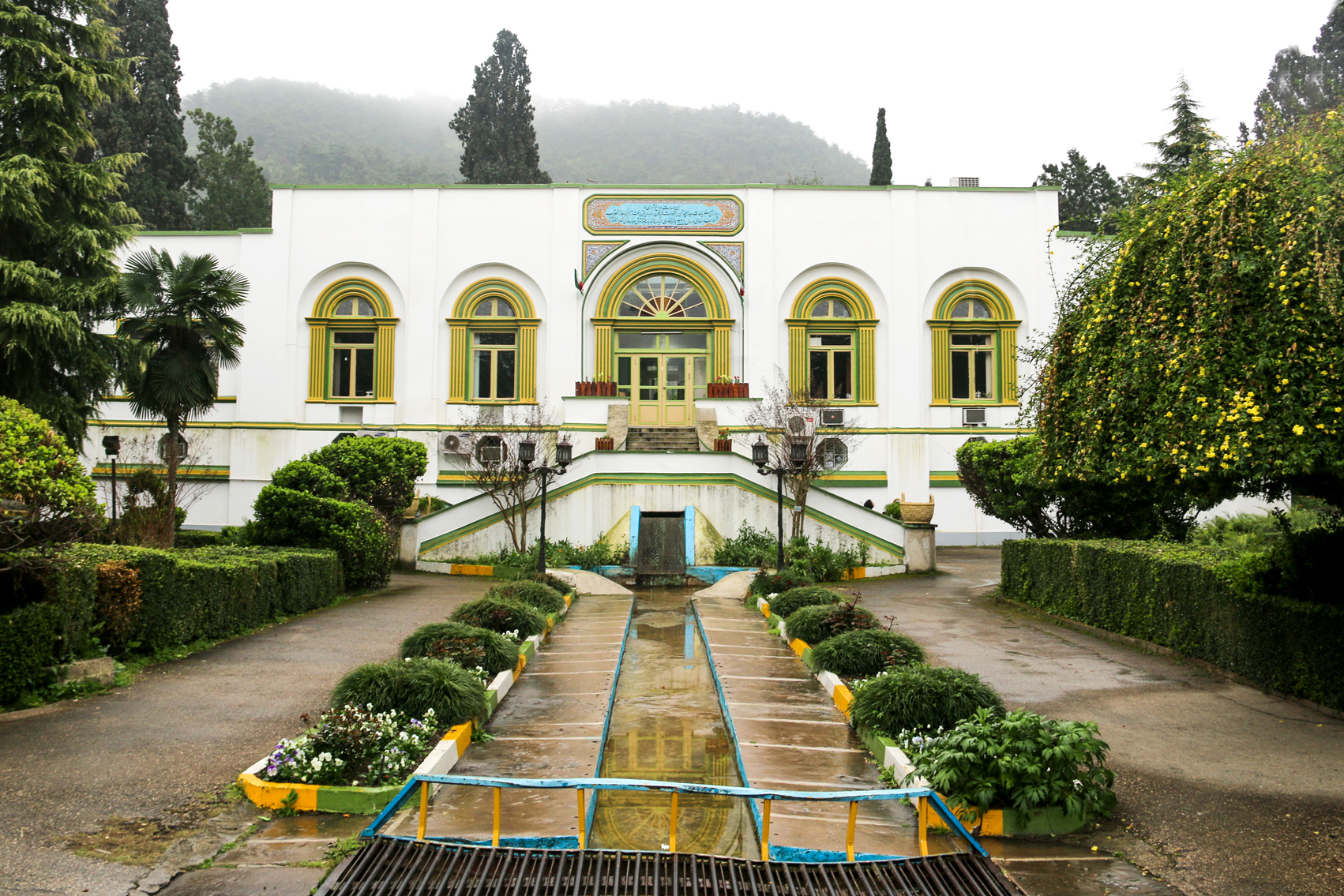
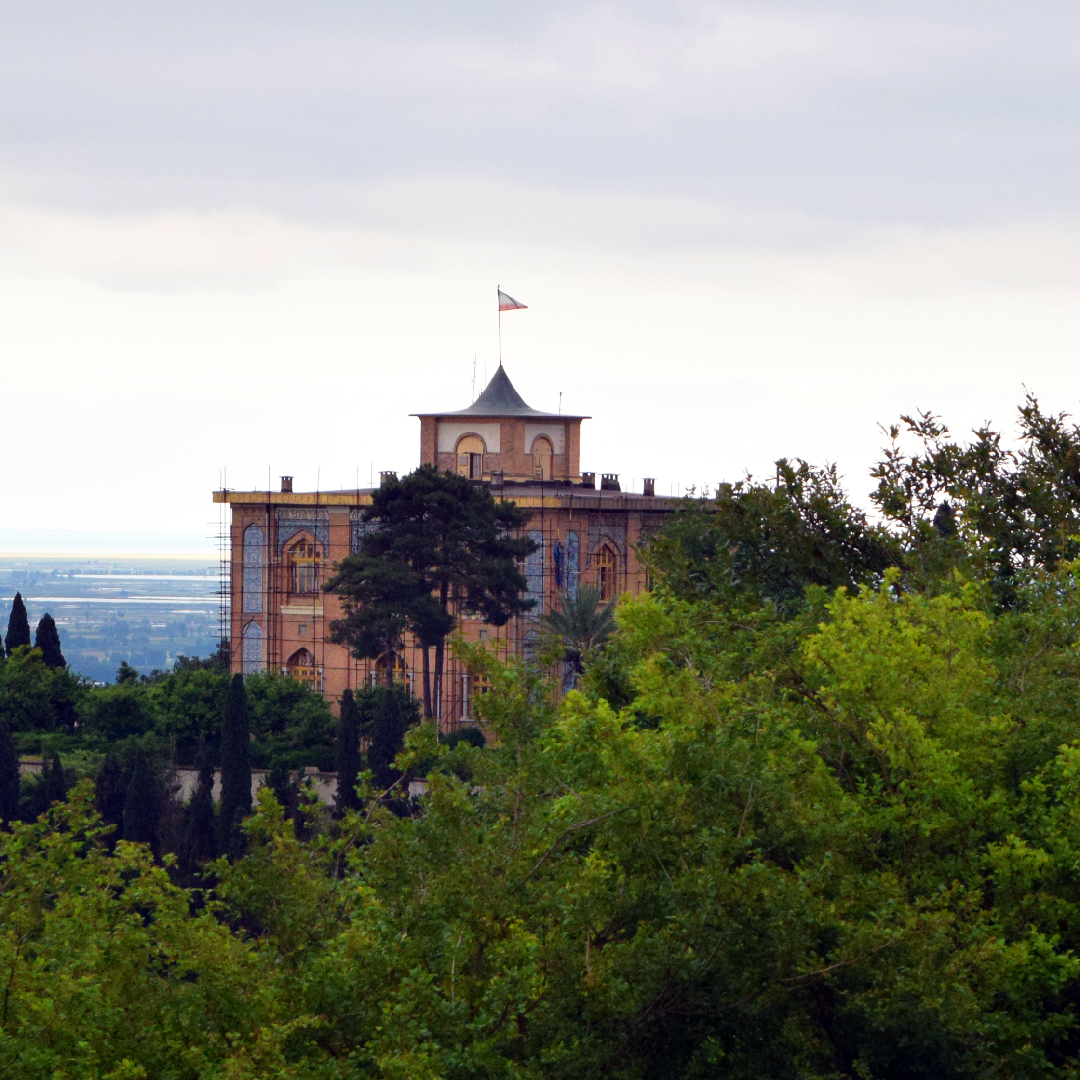
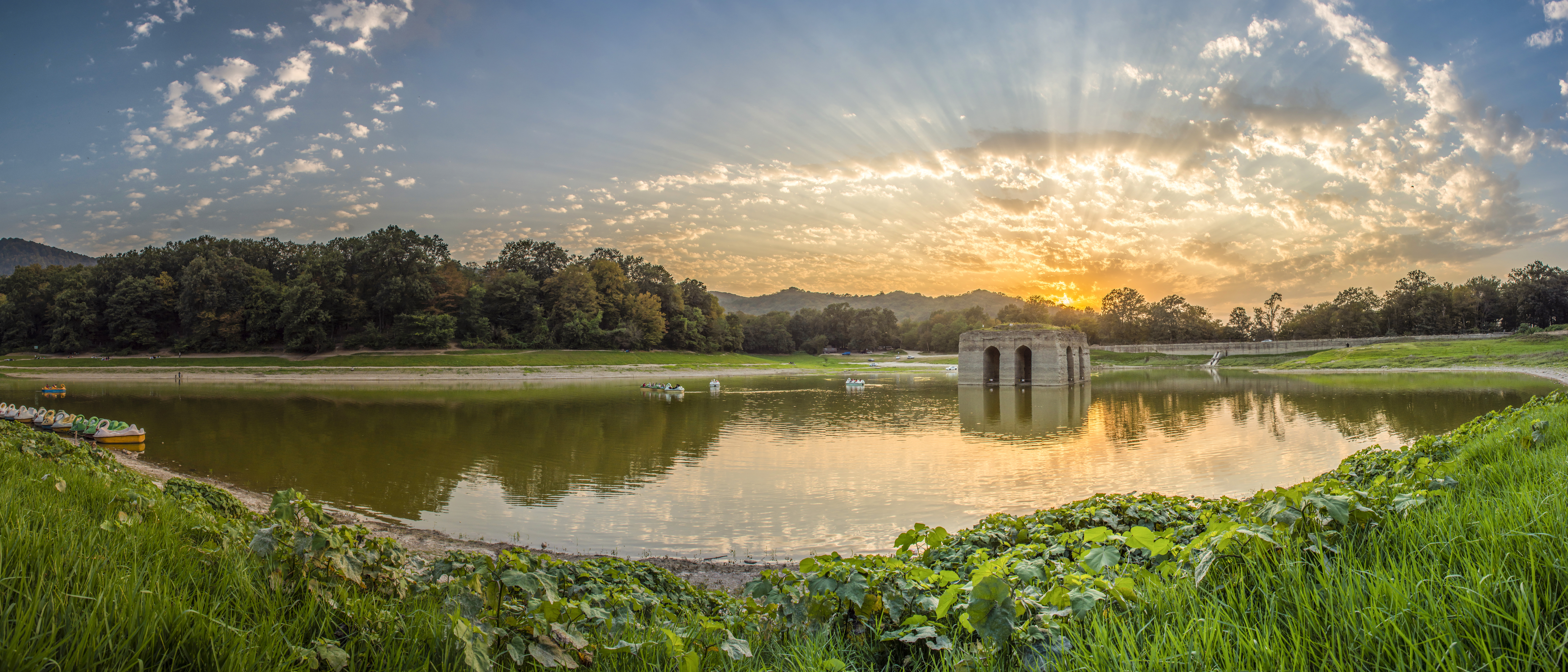
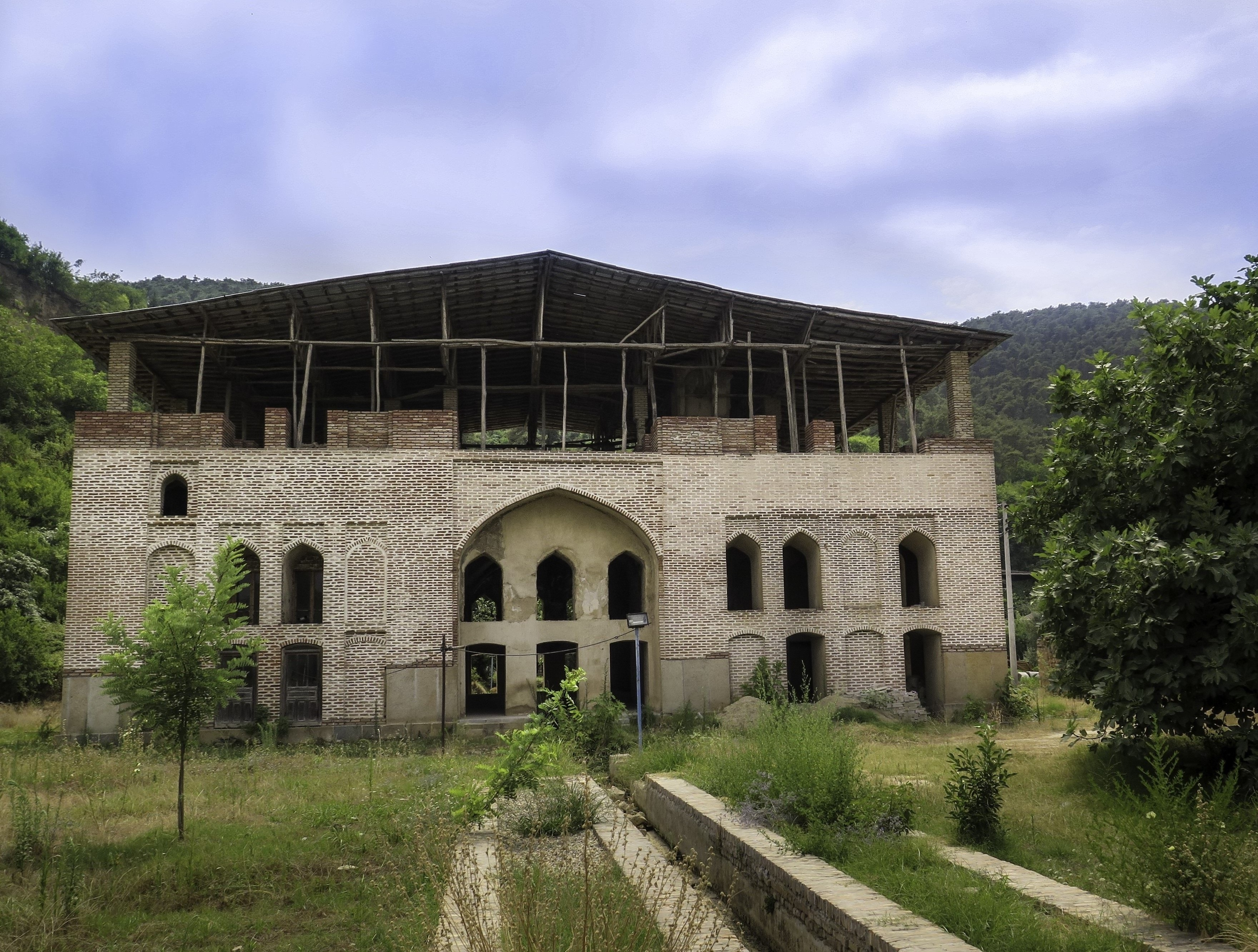
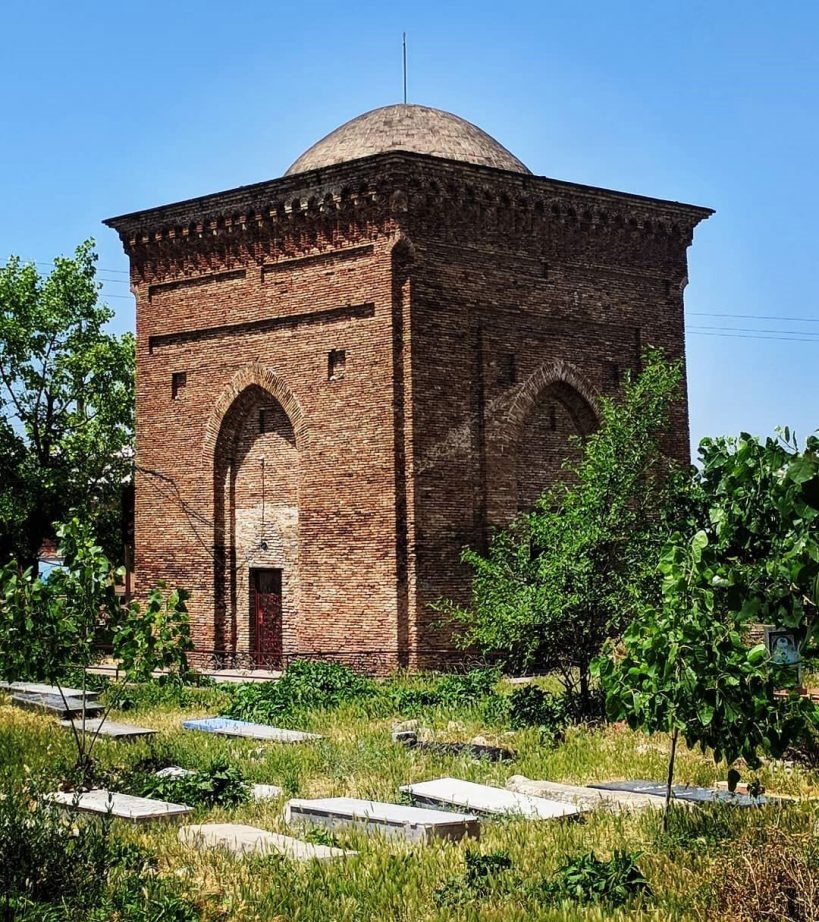

- Location of Behshahr County in Mazandaran province (right, yellow)

- Location of Mazandaran province in Iran
- Coordinates: 36°38′N 53°43′E
- Country: Iran
- Province: Mazandaran
- Capital: Behshahr
- Districts: Central, Yaneh Sar

Area
  - Total: 1,416.27 km^{2} (546.82 sq mi)

Population (2016)
  - Total: 168,769
  - Density: 119.164/km^{2} (308.634/sq mi)
- Time zone: UTC+3:30 (IRST)

Behshahr County (Persian: شهرستانِ بِهْشَهْر) (Note: Romanized as Šahrestan-e Behšahr; Mazanderani: بِهْشَهْرِ شهرسّون, romanized as Behšahr-e-Šahresun) is in Mazandaran province, Iran on the Caspian Sea. Its capital is the city of Behshahr.

== Demographics ==
=== Population ===
At the time of the 2006 National Census, the county's population was 154,957 in 40,432 households. The following census in 2011 counted 155,247 people in 46,100 households. The 2016 census measured the population of the county as 168,769 in 55,140 households.

=== Administrative divisions ===
Behshahr County's population history and administrative structure over three consecutive censuses are shown in the following table.

Behshahr County Population
Administrative Divisions	2006	2011	2016
Central District	144,332	148,279	157,097
Kuhestan RD	17,420	16,680	17,436
Miyan Kaleh RD	18,320	17,355	18,469
Panj Hezareh RD	3,653	3,299	3,772
Behshahr (city)	83,537	89,251	94,702
Khalil Shahr (city)	10,096	10,141	11,032
Rostamkola (city)	11,306	11,553	11,686
Yaneh Sar District	10,625	6,968	11,672
Ashrestaq RD	7,284	4,433	6,911
Shohada RD	3,341	2,535	4,761
Total	154,957	155,247	168,769
RD = Rural District

== See also ==
- Amirabad Port
- Miankaleh peninsula
- Old Hezarjarib - Mazandaran

Media related to Behshahr County at Wikimedia Commons
