= Anah Hajji =

Village in Golestan province, Iran

Anah Hajji Persian: آنه حاجي
- Village
- Location within Iran
- Coordinates: 36°54′08″N 54°09′44″E
- Country: Iran
- Province: Golestan
- County: Torkaman
- District: Si Joval
- Rural District: Qarah Su-ye Sharqi

Population (2016)
  - Total: 198
- Time zone: UTC+3:30 (IRST)

Anah Hajji (Persian: آنه حاجي) (Note: Also romanized as Ānāh Ḩājjī; also known as Ānā Ḩājjī) is a village in Qarah Su-ye Sharqi Rural District of Si Joval District in Torkaman County, Golestan province, Iran.

== Demographics ==
=== Population ===
At the time of the 2006 National Census, the village's population was 183 in 36 households, when it was in Jafarbay-ye Jonubi Rural District of the Central District. The following census in 2011 counted 180 people in 43 households, by which time the village had been separated from the rural district in the formation of Si Joval District. Anah Hajji was transferred to Qarah Su-ye Sharqi Rural District created in the new district. The 2016 census measured the population of the village as 198 people in 59 households.
