= Ashurabad, Golestan =

Village in Golestan province, Iran

Ashurabad Persian: آشورآباد
- Village
- Location within Iran
- Coordinates: 36°51′51″N 54°10′45″E
- Country: Iran
- Province: Golestan
- County: Torkaman
- District: Si Joval
- Rural District: Qarah Su-ye Sharqi

Population (2016)
  - Total: 21
- Time zone: UTC+3:30 (IRST)

Ashurabad (Persian: آشورآباد) (Note: Also romanized as Āshūrābād) is a village in Qarah Su-ye Sharqi Rural District of Si Joval District in Torkaman County, Golestan province, Iran.

== Demographics ==
=== Population ===
At the time of the 2006 National Census, the village's population was 25 in seven households, when it was in Jafarbay-ye Jonubi Rural District of the Central District. The following census in 2011 counted 18 people in five households, by which time the village had been separated from the rural district in the formation of Si Joval District. Ashurabad was transferred to Qarah Su-ye Sharqi Rural District created in the new district. The 2016 census measured the population of the village as 21 people in six households.
