= Qareh Su, Golestan =

Village in Golestan province, Iran

Qareh Su Persian: قره سو
- Village
- Location within Iran
- Coordinates: 36°49′41″N 54°03′08″E
- Country: Iran
- Province: Golestan
- County: Torkaman
- District: Si Joval
- Rural District: Qarah Su-ye Gharbi

Population (2016)
  - Total: 1,843
- Time zone: UTC+3:30 (IRST)

Qareh Su (Persian: قره سو) (Note: Also romanized as Qareh Sū; also known as Sīāh Āb) is a village in Qarah Su-ye Gharbi Rural District of Si Joval District in Torkaman County, Golestan province, Iran.

== Demographics ==
=== Population ===
At the time of the 2006 National Census, the village's population was 1,562 in 305 households, when it was in Jafarbay-ye Jonubi Rural District of the Central District. The following census in 2011 counted 1,736 people in 417 households, by which time the village had been separated from the rural district in the formation of Si Joval District. Qareh Su was transferred to Qarah Su-ye Gharbi Rural District created in the new district. The 2016 census measured the population of the village as 1,843 people in 500 households.
