= Qarah Qashli =

Village in Golestan province, Iran

Qarah Qashli Persian: قره قاشلي
- Village
- Location within Iran
- Coordinates: 36°53′48″N 54°10′30″E
- Country: Iran
- Province: Golestan
- County: Torkaman
- District: Si Joval
- Rural District: Qarah Su-ye Sharqi

Population (2016)
  - Total: 2,731
- Time zone: UTC+3:30 (IRST)

Qarah Qashli (Persian: قره قاشلي) (Note: Also romanized as Qarah Qāshlī and Qareh Qāshlī) is a village in, and the capital of, Qarah Su-ye Sharqi Rural District in Si Joval District of Torkaman County, Golestan province, Iran.

== Demographics ==
=== Population ===
At the time of the 2006 National Census, the village's population was 2,177 in 417 households, when it was in Jafarbay-ye Jonubi Rural District of the Central District. The following census in 2011 counted 2,435 people in 620 households, by which time the village had been separated from the rural district in the formation of Si Joval District. Qarah Qashli was transferred to Qarah Su-ye Sharqi Rural District created in the new district. The 2016 census measured the population of the village as 2,731 people in 677 households. It was the most populous village in its rural district.
