= Pikhi Hajji =

Village in Golestan province, Iran

Pikhi Hajji Persian: پيخي حاجي
- Village
- Location within Iran
- Coordinates: 36°54′20″N 54°12′31″E
- Country: Iran
- Province: Golestan
- County: Torkaman
- District: Si Joval
- Rural District: Qarah Su-ye Sharqi

Population (2016)
  - Total: 483
- Time zone: UTC+3:30 (IRST)

Pikhi Hajji (Persian: پيخي حاجي) (Note: Also romanized as Pīkhī Ḩājjī; also known as Pījī Ḩājjī) is a village in Qarah Su-ye Sharqi Rural District of Si Joval District in Torkaman County, Golestan province, Iran.

== Demographics ==
=== Population ===
At the time of the 2006 National Census, the village's population was 430 in 84 households, when it was in Jafarbay-ye Jonubi Rural District of the Central District. The following census in 2011 counted 433 people in 97 households, by which time the village had been separated from the rural district in the formation of Si Joval District. Pikhi Hajji was transferred to Qarah Su-ye Sharqi Rural District created in the new district. The 2016 census measured the population of the village as 483 people in 118 households.
