= Eyvanabad =

Village in Golestan province, Iran

Eyvanabad Persian: ایوان‌آباد
- Village
- Location within Iran
- Coordinates: 36°53′40″N 54°09′07″E
- Country: Iran
- Province: Golestan
- County: Torkaman
- District: Si Joval
- Rural District: Qarah Su-ye Sharqi

Population (2016)
  - Total: 252
- Time zone: UTC+3:30 (IRST)

Eyvanabad (Persian: ایوان‌آباد) (Note: Also romanized as Eyvānābād) is a village in Qarah Su-ye Sharqi Rural District of Si Joval District in Torkaman County, Golestan province, Iran.

== Demographics ==
=== Population ===
At the time of the 2006 National Census, the village's population was 315 in 72 households, when it was in Jafarbay-ye Jonubi Rural District of the Central District. The following census in 2011 counted 290 people in 73 households, by which time the village had been separated from the rural district in the formation of Si Joval District. Eyvanabad was transferred to Qarah Su-ye Sharqi Rural District created in the new district. The 2016 census measured the population of the village as 252 people in 86 households.
