= Safar Hajji =

Village in Golestan province, Iran

Safar Hajji Persian: صفرحاجي
- Village
- Location within Iran
- Coordinates: 36°53′25″N 54°12′46″E
- Country: Iran
- Province: Golestan
- County: Torkaman
- District: Si Joval
- Rural District: Qarah Su-ye Sharqi

Population (2016)
  - Total: 352
- Time zone: UTC+3:30 (IRST)

Safar Hajji (Persian: صفرحاجي) (Note: Also romanized as Şafar Ḩājjī) is a village in Qarah Su-ye Sharqi Rural District of Si Joval District in Torkaman County, Golestan province, Iran.

== Demographics ==
=== Population ===
At the time of the 2006 National Census, the village's population was 261 in 50 households, when it was in Jafarbay-ye Jonubi Rural District of the Central District. The following census in 2011 counted 300 people in 68 households, by which time the village had been separated from the rural district in the formation of Si Joval District. Safar Hajji was transferred to Qarah Su-ye Sharqi Rural District created in the new district. The 2016 census measured the population of the village as 352 people in 91 households.
