= Qarah Tappeh, Torkaman =

Village in Golestan province, Iran

Qarah Tappeh Persian: قره تپه
- Village
- Location within Iran
- Coordinates: 36°53′37″N 54°13′14″E
- Country: Iran
- Province: Golestan
- County: Torkaman
- District: Si Joval
- Rural District: Qarah Su-ye Sharqi

Population (2016)
  - Total: 982
- Time zone: UTC+3:30 (IRST)

Qarah Tappeh (Persian: قره‌تپه) (Note: Also romanized as Qareh Tappeh) is a village in Qarah Su-ye Sharqi Rural District of Si Joval District in Torkaman County, Golestan province, Iran.

== Demographics ==
=== Population ===
At the time of the 2006 National Census, the village's population was 829 in 174 households, when it was in Jafarbay-ye Jonubi Rural District of the Central District. The following census in 2011 counted 855 people in 198 households, by which time the village had been separated from the rural district in the formation of Si Joval District. Qarah Tappeh was transferred to Qarah Su-ye Sharqi Rural District created in the new district. The 2016 census measured the population of the village as 982 people in 281 households.
