= Niazabad, Golestan =

Village in Golestan province, Iran

Niazabad Persian: نياز آباد
- Village
- Location within Iran
- Coordinates: 36°51′20″N 54°04′58″E
- Country: Iran
- Province: Golestan
- County: Torkaman
- District: Si Joval
- Rural District: Qarah Su-ye Gharbi

Population (2016)
  - Total: 2,226
- Time zone: UTC+3:30 (IRST)

Niazabad (Persian: نياز آباد) (Note: Also romanized as Nīāzābād; also known as Namāzābād) is a village in, and the capital of, Qarah Su-ye Gharbi Rural District in Si Joval District of Torkaman County, Golestan province, Iran.

== Demographics ==
=== Population ===
At the time of the 2006 National Census, the village's population was 1,794 in 344 households, when it was in Jafarbay-ye Jonubi Rural District of the Central District. The following census in 2011 counted 2,051 people in 492 households, by which time the village had been separated from the rural district in the formation of Si Joval District. Niazabad was transferred to Qarah Su-ye Gharbi Rural District created in the new district. The 2016 census measured the population of the village as 2,226 people in 578 households.
