= Zaboli Mahalleh-ye Sofla =

Village in Golestan province, Iran

Zaboli Mahalleh-ye Sofla Persian: زابلي محله سفلي
- Village
- Location within Iran
- Coordinates: 36°52′08″N 54°09′24″E
- Country: Iran
- Province: Golestan
- County: Torkaman
- District: Si Joval
- Rural District: Qarah Su-ye Sharqi

Population (2016)
  - Total: 304
- Time zone: UTC+3:30 (IRST)

Zaboli Mahalleh-ye Sofla (Persian: زابلي محله سفلي) (Note: Also romanized as Zābolī Maḩalleh-ye Soflá; also known as Zābol Maḩalleh-ye Pā’īn and Zābolī Maḩalleh-ye Pā’īn) is a village in Qarah Su-ye Sharqi Rural District of Si Joval District in Torkaman County, Golestan province, Iran.

== Demographics ==
=== Population ===
At the time of the 2006 National Census, the village's population was 354 in 84 households, when it was in Jafarbay-ye Jonubi Rural District of the Central District. The following census in 2011 counted 308 people in 82 households, by which time the village had been separated from the rural district in the formation of Si Joval District. Zaboli Mahalleh-ye Sofla was transferred to Qarah Su-ye Sharqi Rural District created in the new district. The 2016 census measured the population of the village as 304 people in 91 households.
