= Zaboli Mahalleh-ye Olya =

Village in Golestan province, Iran

Zaboli Mahalleh-ye Olya Persian: زابلي محله عليا
- Village
- Location within Iran
- Coordinates: 36°51′40″N 54°08′28″E
- Country: Iran
- Province: Golestan
- County: Torkaman
- District: Si Joval
- Rural District: Qarah Su-ye Sharqi

Population (2016)
  - Total: 319
- Time zone: UTC+3:30 (IRST)

Zaboli Mahalleh-ye Olya (Persian: زابلي محله عليا) (Note: Also romanized as Zābolī Maḩalleh-ye ‘Olyā; also known as Zābol Maḩalleh-ye Bālā and Zābolī Maḩalleh-ye Bālā) is a village in Qarah Su-ye Sharqi Rural District of Si Joval District in Torkaman County, Golestan province, Iran.

== Demographics ==
=== Population ===
At the time of the 2006 National Census, the village's population was 376 in 86 households, when it was in Jafarbay-ye Jonubi Rural District of the Central District. The following census in 2011 counted 348 people in 91 households, by which time the village had been separated from the rural district in the formation of Si Joval District. Zaboli Mahalleh-ye Olya was transferred to Qarah Su-ye Sharqi Rural District created in the new district. The 2016 census measured the population of the village as 319 people in 96 households.
