= Gamishli Nazar =

Village in Golestan province, Iran

Gamishli Nazar Persian: گاميشلی نزار
- Village
- Location within Iran
- Coordinates: 36°59′24″N 54°05′07″E
- Country: Iran
- Province: Golestan
- County: Torkaman
- District: Central
- Rural District: Faraghi

Population (2016)
  - Total: 996
- Time zone: UTC+3:30 (IRST)

Gamishli Nazar (Persian: گاميشلی نزار) (Note: Also romanized as Gāmīshlī Nazār; also known as Gāmīshlī and Gomīshlī) is a village in Faraghi Rural District of the Central District in Torkaman County, Golestan province, Iran.

== Demographics ==
=== Population ===
At the time of the 2006 National Census, the village's population was 1,002 in 215 households, when it was in Jafarbay-ye Jonubi Rural District. The following census in 2011 counted 863 people in 238 households, by which time the village had been separated from the rural district in creating Faraghi Rural District of the same district. The 2016 census measured the population of the village as 996 people in 290 households.
