= Khambarabad, Torkaman =

Village in Golestan province, Iran

Khambarabad Persian: خمبرآباد
- Village
- Location within Iran
- Coordinates: 36°54′31″N 54°17′12″E
- Country: Iran
- Province: Golestan
- County: Torkaman
- District: Central
- Rural District: Faraghi

Population (2016)
  - Total: 229
- Time zone: UTC+3:30 (IRST)

Khambarabad (Persian: خمبرآباد) (Note: Also romanized as Khambarābād) is a village in Faraghi Rural District of the Central District in Torkaman County, Golestan province, Iran.

== Demographics ==
=== Population ===
At the time of the 2006 National Census, the village's population was 357 in 88 households, when it was in Jafarbay-ye Jonubi Rural District. The following census in 2011 counted 219 people in 68 households, by which time the village had been separated from the rural district in creating Faraghi Rural District of the same district. The 2016 census measured the population of the village as 229 people in 64 households.
