= Arkh-e Kuchek =

Village in Golestan province, Iran

Arkh-e Kuchek Persian: ارخ کوچک
- Village
- Location within Iran
- Coordinates: 36°57′32″N 54°15′08″E
- Country: Iran
- Province: Golestan
- County: Torkaman
- District: Central
- Rural District: Faraghi

Population (2016)
  - Total: 721
- Time zone: UTC+3:30 (IRST)

Arkh-e Kuchek (Persian: ارخ کوچک) (Note: Also romanized as Arkh-e Kūchek) is a village in Faraghi Rural District of the Central District in Torkaman County, Golestan province, Iran.

== Demographics ==
=== Population ===
At the time of the 2006 National Census, the village's population was 571 in 114 households, when it was in Jafarbay-ye Sharqi Rural District of the former Gomishan District. The following census in 2011 counted 618 people in 144 households, by which time the district had been separated from the county in the establishment of Gomishan County. Arkh-e Kuchek was transferred to Faraghi Rural District created in the Central District. The 2016 census measured the population of the village as 721 people in 163 households.
