= Chapaqli =

Village in Golestan province, Iran

Chapaqli Persian: چاپاقلی
- Village
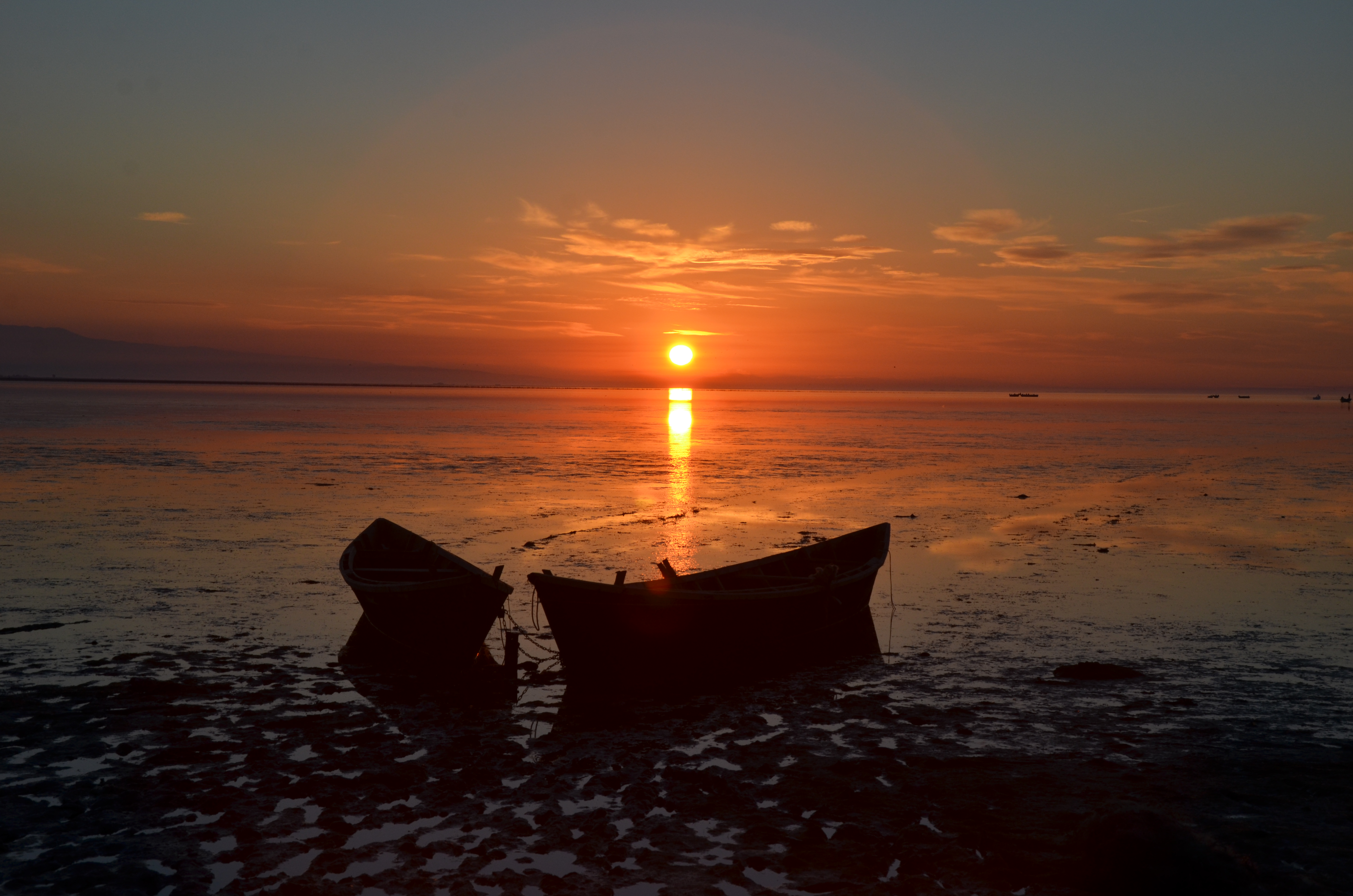
- Caspian Sea coast near Chapaqli

- Location within Iran
- Coordinates: 36°57′36″N 54°04′58″E
- Country: Iran
- Province: Golestan
- County: Torkaman
- District: Central
- Rural District: Jafarbay-ye Jonubi

Population (2016)
  - Total: 3,064
- Time zone: UTC+3:30 (IRST)

Chapaqli (Persian: چاپاقلی) (Note: Also romanized as Chāpāqlī; also known as Chafqolī) is a village in Jafarbay-ye Jonubi Rural District of the Central District of Torkaman County, Golestan province, Iran.

== Demographics ==
=== Population ===
At the time of the 2006 National Census, the village's population was 2,572 in 490 households. The following census in 2011 counted 2,933 people in 700 households. The 2016 census measured the population of the village as 3,064 people in 770 households. It was the most populous village in its rural district.
