= Seydabad, Golestan =

Village in Golestan province, Iran

Seydabad Persian: صيد آباد
- Village
- Location within Iran
- Coordinates: 36°57′30″N 54°05′02″E
- Country: Iran
- Province: Golestan
- County: Torkaman
- District: Central
- Rural District: Jafarbay-ye Jonubi

Population (2016)
  - Total: 552
- Time zone: UTC+3:30 (IRST)

Seydabad (Persian: صيد آباد) (Note: Also romanized as Seydābād; also known as Sa‘īdābād) is a village in Jafarbay-ye Jonubi Rural District of the Central District of Torkaman County, Golestan province, Iran.

== Demographics ==
=== Population ===
At the time of the 2006 National Census, the village's population was 447 in 82 households. The following census in 2011 counted 432 people in 94 households. The 2016 census measured the population of the village as 552 people in 159 households.
