= Hashemanli =

Village in Golestan province, Iran

Hashemanli Persian: هاشمنلی
- Village
- Location within Iran
- Coordinates: 36°57′03″N 54°08′23″E
- Country: Iran
- Province: Golestan
- County: Torkaman
- District: Central
- Rural District: Jafarbay-ye Jonubi

Population (2016)
  - Total: 154
- Time zone: UTC+3:30 (IRST)

Hashemanli (Persian: هاشمنلی) (Note: Also romanized as Hāshemanlī; also known as Hāshem Elá) is a village in Jafarbay-ye Jonubi Rural District of the Central District of Torkaman County, Golestan province, Iran.

== Demographics ==
=== Population ===
At the time of the 2006 National Census, the village's population was 135 in 27 households. The following census in 2011 counted 137 people in 31 households. The 2016 census measured the population of the village as 154 people in 41 households.
