= Aq Sin Tappeh =

Village in Golestan province, Iran

Aq Sin Tappeh Persian: اق سين تپه
- Village
- Location within Iran
- Coordinates: 36°55′46″N 54°20′17″E
- Country: Iran
- Province: Golestan
- County: Torkaman
- District: Central
- Rural District: Faraghi

Population (2016)
  - Total: 204
- Time zone: UTC+3:30 (IRST)

Aq Sin Tappeh (Persian: اق سين تپه) (Note: Also romanized as Āq Sīn Tappeh) is a village in Faraghi Rural District of the Central District in Torkaman County, Golestan province, Iran.

== Demographics ==
=== Population ===
At the time of the 2006 National Census, the village's population was 216 in 48 households, when it was in Jafarbay-ye Sharqi Rural District of the former Gomishan District. The following census in 2011 counted 225 people in 61 households, by which time the district had been separated from the county in the establishment of Gomishan County. Aq Sin Tappeh was transferred to Faraghi Rural District created in the Central District. The 2016 census measured the population of the village as 204 people in 56 households.
