= Urkat Hajji =

Village in Golestan province, Iran

Urkat Hajji Persian: اوركت حاجی
- Village
- Location within Iran
- Coordinates: 36°54′27″N 54°06′47″E
- Country: Iran
- Province: Golestan
- County: Torkaman
- District: Central
- Rural District: Jafarbay-ye Jonubi

Population (2016)
  - Total: 395
- Time zone: UTC+3:30 (IRST)

Urkat Hajji (Persian: اوركت حاجی) (Note: Also romanized as Ūrkat Ḩājjī) is a village in Jafarbay-ye Jonubi Rural District of the Central District of Torkaman County, Golestan province, Iran.

== Demographics ==
=== Population ===
At the time of the 2006 National Census, the village's population was 269 in 60 households. The following census in 2011 counted 307 people in 84 households. The 2016 census measured the population of the village as 395 people in 99 households.
