= Eskeleh =

Village in Golestan province, Iran

Eskeleh Persian: اسكله
- Village
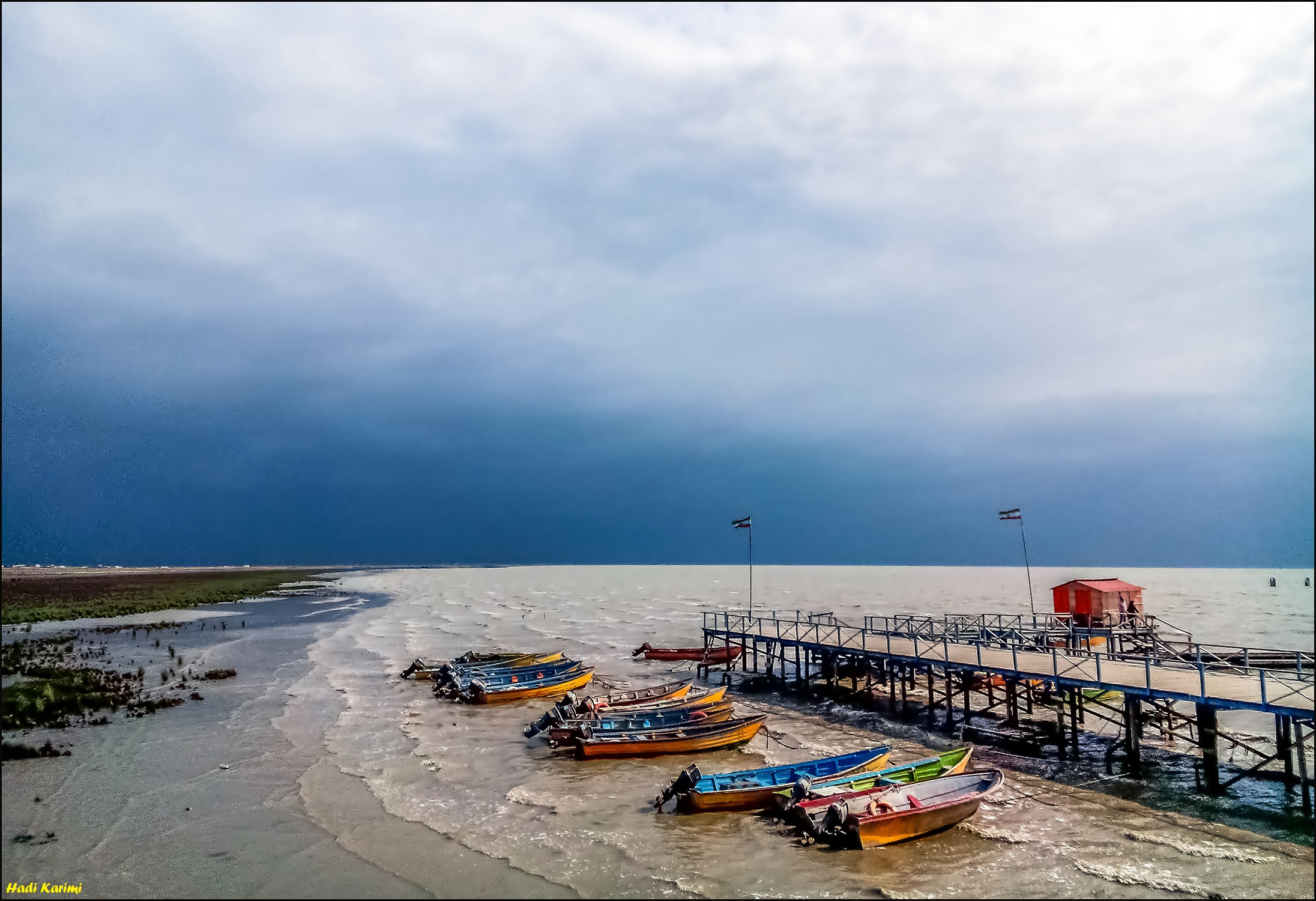
- Eskeleh, Bandar Torkaman in 2014

- Location within Iran
- Country: Iran
- Province: Golestan
- County: Torkaman
- District: Central
- Rural District: Jafarbay-ye Jonubi

Population (2016)
  - Total: Below reporting threshold
- Time zone: UTC+3:30 (IRST)

Eskeleh (Persian: اسكله) (Note: Also known as Kūy-e Faraḩbakhsh and Kū-ye Faraḩ Bakhsh) is a village in Jafarbay-ye Jonubi Rural District of the Central District of Torkaman County, Golestan province, Iran.

== Demographics ==
=== Population ===
At the time of the 2006 National Census, the village's population was 20 in six households. The following censuses in 2011 and 2016 counted a population below the reporting threshold.
