= Mohammadabad-e Shomali =

Village in Golestan province, Iran

Mohammadabad-e Shomali Persian: محمد آبادشمالي
- Village
- Location within Iran
- Coordinates: 36°54′42″N 54°16′11″E
- Country: Iran
- Province: Golestan
- County: Torkaman
- District: Central
- Rural District: Faraghi

Population (2016)
  - Total: 194
- Time zone: UTC+3:30 (IRST)

Mohammadabad-e Shomali (Persian: محمدآباد شمالی) (Note: Also romanized as Mohammadābād-e Shomāli) is a village in Faraghi Rural District of the Central District in Torkaman County, Golestan province, Iran.

== Demographics ==
=== Population ===
The village did not appear in the 2006 National Census. The following census in 2011 counted 171 people in 52 households. The 2016 census measured the population of the village as 194 people in 56 households.
