= Panj Peykar =

Village in Golestan province, Iran

Panj Peykar Persian: پنج پيكر
- Village
- Location within Iran
- Coordinates: 36°56′56″N 54°09′31″E
- Country: Iran
- Province: Golestan
- County: Torkaman
- District: Central
- Rural District: Jafarbay-ye Jonubi

Population (2016)
  - Total: 2,528
- Time zone: UTC+3:30 (IRST)

Panj Peykar (Persian: پنج پيكر) (Note: Also known as Bāsh Ushka, Bash Ūshtā, Besh Yūsqeh, Beshūrādeh, Beshūsqeh, and Panj Beykar) is a village in, and the capital of, Jafarbay-ye Jonubi Rural District in the Central District of Torkaman County, Golestan province, Iran. The previous capital of the rural district was the village of Si Joval, now a city.

== Demographics ==
=== Population ===
At the time of the 2006 National Census, the village's population was 2,226 in 433 households. The following census in 2011 counted 2,408 people in 590 households. The 2016 census measured the population of the village as 2,528 people in 710 households.
