= Zaboli (disambiguation) =

Zaboli (Persian: زابلي) or its variants may refer to:

== Afghanistan ==
- Zabulistan, an historical region of southern Afghanistan

== Iran ==
=== Golestan province ===
- Zaboli Mahalleh-ye Mahastan, a village in Aliabad County
- Zaboliabad, a village in Gonbad-e Kavus County
- Zabolimahalleh-ye Quchmorad, a village in Gonbad-e Kavus County
- Zaboli Mahallah Qarah Shur, a village in Kalaleh County
- Zaboli Mahalleh-ye Olya, a village in Torkaman County
- Zaboli Mahalleh-ye Sofla, a village in Torkaman County

=== Sistan and Baluchestan province ===
- Mehrestan, a city formerly known as Zaboli in Mehrestan County
- Zaboli Rural District, an administrative division of Mehrestan County
