= Qarah Su-ye Gharbi Rural District =

Rural district in Golestan province, Iran

Qarah Su-ye Gharbi Rural District Persian: دهستان قره‌سو غربی
- Rural District
- Location within Iran
- Coordinates: 36°52′N 54°05′E
- Country: Iran
- Province: Golestan
- County: Torkaman
- District: Si Joval
- Established: 2009
- Capital: Niazabad

Population (2016)
  - Total: 7,816
- Time zone: UTC+3:30 (IRST)

Qarah Su-ye Gharbi Rural District (Persian: دهستان قره‌سو غربی) is in Si Joval District of Torkaman County, Golestan province, Iran. Its capital is the village of Niazabad.

== History ==
In 2009, villages were separated from the Central District in the establishment of Si Joval District, and Qarah Su-ye Gharbi Rural District was created in the new district.

== Demographics ==
=== Population ===
At the time of the 2011 census, the rural district's population was 7,266 in 1,765 households. The 2016 census measured the population of the rural district as 7,816 in 2,054 households. The most populous of its three villages was Si Joval (now a city), with 3,747 people.

=== Other villages in the rural district ===
- Qareh Su
