= Khajehlar =

Khajehlar (Persian: خاجِهلَر) may refer to:

- Khujehlar, Kalaleh
- Khvajehlar
