= Asiye Khanum Ezzeddin Qajar =

Iranian royalty (d. 1802/03)

- Mahd-e Olia
- Died: 1802/03
- Spouse: Hossein Qoli Khan Qajar
- Issue: Fath-Ali Shah Qajar
- Dynasty: Qajar
- Father: Mohammad Khan Ezzeddinlou Qajar
- Religion: Shia Islam

Asiye Khanum Ezzeddin Qajar (Persian: آسیه خانم عزالدین قاجار; died 1802/03) was the mother of Fath-Ali Shah Qajar (r. 1797–1834). She functioned as the administrator of the Qajar harem and the treasurer of her son, the Shah. When she died, her son married her trusted slave servant Khazen ol-Dowleh, who succeeded Asiye Khanum as harem administrator and treasurer. Asiyeh Khanum was one of the prominent and influential women of the Qajar era. She was the beloved and held in high regard by Agha Mohammad Khan.

Asiyeh Khanum was a compassionate and benevolent lady who spent most of her life caring for the poor and aiding the destitute. She was renowned for her kindness and humanitarianism. On numerous occasions at her son’s court, she interceded on behalf of wrongdoers and was able to prevent the execution of some who had fallen under the shah’s wrath. Apart from her special attention to scholars and poets, Asiyeh Khanum also took an interest in the construction of public buildings, particularly schools. Among her charitable works was the repair of Hakim Hashem’s school, which afterward became known as the Shah’s Mother School. She was also concerned with the welfare of teachers and students, providing them with stipends and allowances.

== Biography ==
Asiye Khanom, the daughter of Mohammad Khan Ezzeddinlou (Ozdadlou) Qajar from the Ashaqa-Bash tribe, was married to Hossein Qoli Khan Qajar, the brother of Agha Mohammad Khan Qajar and the governor of Damghan, in 1182 AH. A year later (1772) their first child, Fath-Ali, was born in Damghan. After the assassination of Hossein Qoli Khan by the order of Karim Khan Zand, Asiye Khanom and her two sons were returned to the Qajar tribe by Agha Mohammad Khan. After Agha Mohammad Khan escaped from Shiraz, Asiye Khanom joined him, and they married. Following the conquest of Tehran, Agha Mohammad Khan brought her and her sons to the city. Asiyeh was a devout and charitable woman who strived to promote knowledge and honor scholars. She was also the mother of Fath-Ali Shah Qajar, which gave her the means to oversee and attend to many affairs.

Asiye, along with Mirza Mohammad Zaki, the Chief Financial Officer, was tasked by the Shah to unite other Qajar tribal leaders in Astarabad by offering them gifts. In 1024 AH, Fath-Ali, Asiye's son, became the crown prince of Agha Mohammad Khan. In 1207 AH, she traveled to the holy cities of Iraq and buried the bones of Mohammad Hassan Khan Qajar and Hossein Qoli Khan Jahansouz in Najaf. Asiye Khanom protected the throne and royal wealth until her son's ascension to the throne.

When Fath-Ali Shah became shah, Asiye's other son, Hossein Qoli Khan, rebelled against his brother, but Asiye Khanom mediated peace between the two. In 1216 AH (1801), she again traveled to the holy cities and took Agha Mohammad Khan's tombstone with her. She is also known for renovating the Hakim Hashem School, an endowment of hers, which is why the school is also known as "Madar-e Shah" (Mother of the Shah). She died in 1217 AH (1802) in Tehran and was buried in Najaf. Throughout her life, Asiye Khanom mediated between her sons, but after her death, Fath-Ali Shah blinded his brother.

Asiyeh Khanum Qajar, mother of Fath-Ali Shah Qajar, was one of the prominent and influential women of the Qajar era. She played a crucial role in the upbringing and formation of Fath-Ali Shah’s character and was recognized as a respected figure at the Qajar court. Throughout her life, Asiyeh Khanum was consistently held in high regard, and her wisdom and prudence made her influential in both political and family affairs. Her passing was a great loss for the Qajar family and particularly Fath-Ali Shah. Her death was not only personally painful for the shah but also had political repercussions at the court. As a wise mother and trusted advisor, she had always played a key role in important decision-making, and her absence left a noticeable void in the court. As the mother of Fath-Ali Shah, Asiyeh Khanum Qajar contributed significantly to consolidating the Qajar dynasty’s power. She influenced her son’s upbringing and was instrumental in strengthening familial and political relationships. Respected for her wisdom and prudence, her death was considered a major loss for the Qajar family.

== Titles ==
Asiye Khanom was titled Um al-Khaqan (Persian: ام الخاقان) and Mahd-e Olya. After Jeeran Khanum, she was the second person in the Qajar dynasty to hold the title of Mahd-e Olya. Following her, Naneh Khanom Barforoush, another wife of Fath-Ali Shah, held this title, and then Galin Khanum, Abbas Mirza's wife, followed by Malek Jahan Khanum, the mother of Naser al-Din Shah Qajar. After Malek Jahan Khanum, no one was referred to by this title.
