= Khvajehlar =

Village in Golestan province, Iran

Khvajehlar Persian: خواجه لر
- Village
- Location within Iran
- Coordinates: 36°56′54″N 54°12′26″E
- Country: Iran
- Province: Golestan
- County: Torkaman
- District: Central
- Rural District: Faraghi

Population (2016)
  - Total: 2,193
- Time zone: UTC+3:30 (IRST)

Khvajehlar (Persian: خواجه لر) (Note: Also romanized as Khvājehlar; also known as Khājehlar) is a village in, and the capital of, Faraghi Rural District in the Central District of Torkaman County, Golestan province, Iran.

== Demographics ==
=== Population ===
At the time of the 2006 National Census, the village's population was 1,848 in 366 households, when it was in Jafarbay-ye Sharqi Rural District of the former Gomishan District. The following census in 2011 counted 2,057 people in 486 households, by which time the district had been separated from the county in the establishment of Gomishan County. Khvajehlar was transferred to Faraghi Rural District created in the Central District. The 2016 census measured the population of the village as 2,193 people in 527 households. It was the most populous village in its rural district.
