= Si Joval =

City in Golestan province, Iran

Si Joval Persian: سيجوال
- City
- Location within Iran
- Coordinates: 36°52′57″N 54°06′57″E
- Country: Iran
- Province: Golestan
- County: Torkaman
- District: Si Joval
- Established as a city: 2020

Population (2016)
  - Total: 3,747
- Time zone: UTC+3:30 (IRST)

Si Joval (Persian: سيجوال) (Note: Also romanized as Sijaval; also known as Seijuwol and Theijuwoll) is a city in, and the capital of, Si Joval District in Torkaman County, Golestan province, Iran. As a village, it was the capital of Jafarbay-ye Jonubi Rural District until its capital was transferred to the village of Panj Peykar.

== Demographics ==
Si Joval population history
Year	Pop.	±%
1966	1,748	—
1976	2,348	+34.3%
1986	2,968	+26.4%
2006	3,026	+2.0%
2011	3,479	+15.0%
2016	3,747	+7.7%

=== Population ===
At the time of the 1966 census, as a village in Bandar Shah rural district of Gorgan County, its population was 1,748 people in 265 households. The village's facilities included Mosque, Elementary School and Clinic. The total rural land coverage was 17,000 hectares (42,000 acres), used for cultivating Cotton, Wheat and Barley. At the 1976 census, Si Joval was in Jafarbay-ye Jonubi Rural District with a population of 2,348 people and 319 households.

At the 1986 census, Si Joval was in the Central District of Torkaman County, with a population of 2,968 people in 416 households, it had tap water and Electricity connection. In 1997, the county was transferred to Golestan Province.

At the time of the 2006 National Census, Si Joval's population was 3,026 in 631 households. The following census in 2011 counted 3,479 people in 856 households, by which time the village had been separated from the rural district in the formation of Si Joval District. Si Joval was transferred to Qarah Su-ye Gharbi Rural District created in the new district. The 2016 census measured the population of the village as 3,747 people in 976 households. It was the most populous village in its rural district.

Si Joval was converted to a city in 2020.
