= Eslam Tappeh, Golestan =

Village in Golestan province, Iran

Eslam Tappeh Persian: اسلام تپه
- Village
- Location within Iran
- Coordinates: 36°56′20″N 54°21′22″E
- Country: Iran
- Province: Golestan
- County: Torkaman
- District: Central
- Rural District: Faraghi

Population (2016)
  - Total: 1,119
- Time zone: UTC+3:30 (IRST)

Eslam Tappeh (Persian: اسلام تپه) (Note: Also romanized as Eslām Tappeh) is a village in Faraghi Rural District of the Central District in Torkaman County, Golestan province, Iran.

== Demographics ==
=== Population ===
At the time of the 2006 National Census, the village's population was 1,024 in 190 households, when it was in Jafarbay-ye Sharqi Rural District of the former Gomishan District. The following census in 2011 counted 1,089 people in 249 households, by which time the district had been separated from the county in the establishment of Gomishan County. Eslam Tappeh was transferred to Faraghi Rural District created in the Central District. The 2016 census measured the population of the village as 1,119 people in 267 households.
