= Eslam Tappeh =

Eslam Tappeh (Persian: اسلام تپه) may refer to:

- Eslam Tappeh, Golestan
- Eslam Tappeh, West Azerbaijan
