= Qarah Su-ye Sharqi Rural District =

Rural district in Golestan province, Iran

Qarah Su-ye Sharqi Rural District Persian: دهستان قره‌سو شرقی
- Rural District
- Location within Iran
- Coordinates: 36°54′N 54°12′E
- Country: Iran
- Province: Golestan
- County: Torkaman
- District: Si Joval
- Established: 2009
- Capital: Qarah Qashli

Population (2016)
  - Total: 5,642
- Time zone: UTC+3:30 (IRST)

Qarah Su-ye Sharqi Rural District (Persian: دهستان قره‌سو شرقی) is in Si Joval District of Torkaman County, Golestan province, Iran. Its capital is the village of Qarah Qashli.

== History ==
In 2009, villages were separated from the Central District in the establishment of Si Joval District, and Qarah Su-ye Sharqi Rural District was created in the new district.

== Demographics ==
=== Population ===
At the time of the 2011 census, the rural district's population was 5,167 in 1,277 households. The 2016 census measured the population of the rural district as 5,642 in 1,505 households. The most populous of its nine villages was Qarah Qashli, with 2,731 people.

=== Other villages in the rural district ===
- Anah Hajji
- Ashurabad
- Eyvanabad
- Pikhi Hajji
- Qarah Tappeh
- Safar Hajji
- Zaboli Mahalleh-ye Olya
- Zaboli Mahalleh-ye Sofla
