= Yamut (disambiguation) =

Yamut is a village in Golestan Province, Iran.

Yamut may also refer to:

- Nuri Yamut (1890–1961), Turkish general
- Yamut ibn al-Muzarri (d. 916), Abbasid poet and writer

== See also ==
- Yamout
