= Agha Mohammad Khan Qajar =

Shah of Iran from 1789 to 1797

Agha Mohammad Shah Qajar آقا محمد شاه قاجار
- Shahanshah
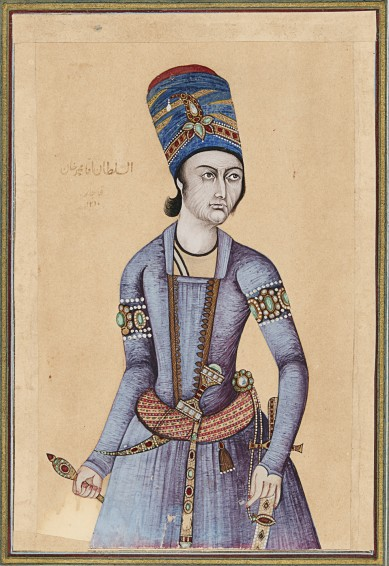
- Contemporary portrait of Agha Mohammad Khan, dated 1795

Shah of Iran
- Reign: 1794 – 17 June 1797
- Coronation: March 1796
- Predecessor: Lotf Ali Khan (Zand); Shahrokh Shah (Afsharid)
- Successor: Fath-Ali Shah Qajar
- Vizier: Hajji Ebrahim Shirazi
- Born: 14 March 1742; Astarabad, Afsharid Iran
- Died: 17 June 1797 (aged 55); Shusha, Qajar Iran
- Burial: Imam Ali Mosque
- Spouse: Golbakht Khanom; Maryam Khanom; Asiya Khanom
Names
- Agha Mohammad Shah Qajar
Regnal name
- Agha Mohammad Shah
- Dynasty: Qajar
- Father: Mohammad Hasan Khan Qajar
- Mother: Jeeran Khanum
- Religion: Twelver Shia Islam
- Tughra
- Military career
- Conflicts: Qajar-Zand Wars; Battle of Astarabad (1759); Battle of Kashan; Qajar capture of Isfahan (1785); Battle of Persepolis; Qajar capture of Shiraz (1792); Siege of Kerman; Astarabad Expedition of 1781–1782; Qajar expedition into Khorasan; Qajar conquest of Georgia; Battle of Krtsanisi; Siege of Tbilisi (1795); Siege of Shusha (1795); Persian expedition of 1796; Siege of Shusha (1797)

Agha Mohammad Khan Qajar (Persian: آقا محمد خان قاجار, romanized: Âqâ Mohammad Xân-e Qâjâr; 14 March 1742 – 17 June 1797), also known by his regnal name of Agha Mohammad Shah (آقامحمد شاه), was the founder of the Qajar dynasty of Iran, ruling as Shah from 1789 to 1797, after reunifying the country and establishing Tehran as its capital.

He was the son of Mohammad Hasan Khan, a chieftain of the Quwanlu branch of the Qajar tribe who vied for the throne of Iran after the death of Nader Shah. As a child, he was captured by Nader's successor Adel Shah and castrated. His father was killed in 1759, and in 1763 he was captured by Karim Khan Zand, Iran's new overlord. He spent the next sixteen years as a hostage at Karim Khan's court in Shiraz; after the latter's death, he escaped to northern Iran, where he spent nearly a decade campaigning to consolidate his rule, struggling with his brothers and several Zand pretenders. He took control of all northern Iran and in 1786 made Tehran his capital; it has since remained the country's capital.

Agha Mohammad Khan was enthroned as the shah of Iran in 1789 (but not yet crowned), and in 1794 he defeated his last major competitor, the Zand prince Lotf Ali Khan, inflicting immense destruction on the city of Kerman after taking it. In 1796, he campaigned to reassert Iranian rule north of the Aras River, where he forced the local khanates into submission and brutally sacked the Georgian city of Tiflis (Tbilisi). He was then crowned shāhanshāh (King of Kings) in 1796. On 17 June 1797, during a second campaign in the South Caucasus, he was assassinated by two of his servants whom he had condemned to death. He was succeeded by his nephew and designated heir, Fath-Ali, whose descendants ruled Iran until 1925.

Agha Mohammad Khan's reign is noted for the return of a centralized and unified Iran and for relocating the capital to Tehran. He is noted for his cruel and rapacious behavior, particularly during his Georgia and Kerman campaigns. However, he has also been described as a "pragmatic, calculating, and shrewd military and political leader."

== Early life (1742–1779) ==
=== Family and youth ===
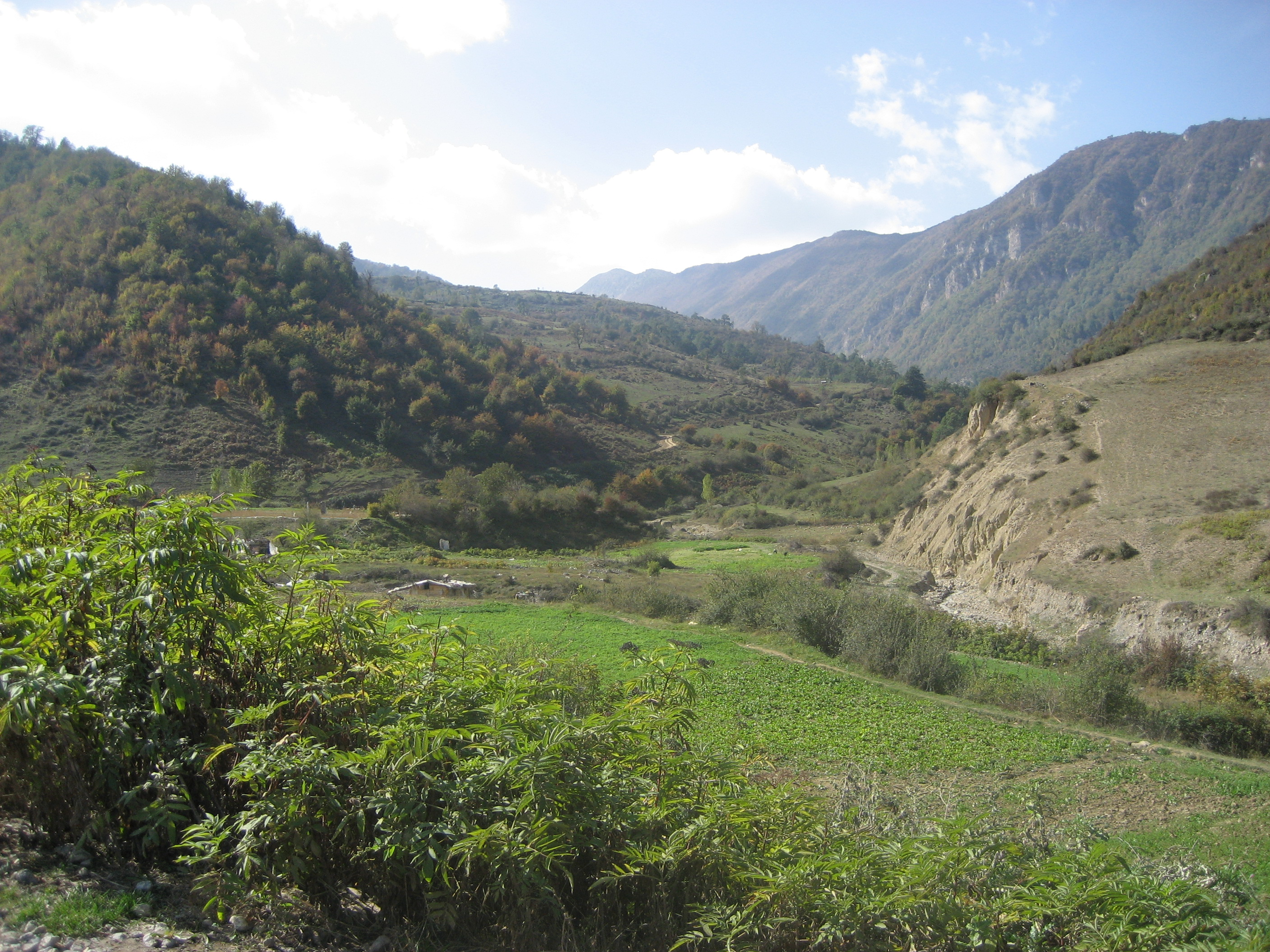
The landscape of Astarabad, the birthplace of Agha Mohammad Khan.

Agha Mohammad Khan was born in Astarabad around 1742. He belonged to the Quwanlu (also spelled Qawanlu) branch of the Qajar tribe. The Qajars were one of the original Turkoman Qizilbash tribes that emerged and spread in Asia Minor around the tenth and eleventh centuries. They later supplied power to the Safavids since the dynasty's earliest days. The tribe had several other branches, one of the most prominent ones being the Develu, which often fought against the Quwanlu. Agha Mohammad Khan was the eldest son of the chieftain of the Quwanlu clan, Mohammad Hasan Khan Qajar, and the grandson of Fath-Ali Khan Qajar, a prominent aristocrat executed by the orders of Shah Tahmasp II (possibly compelled by Nader Qoli Beg, who came to be known as Nader Shah after usurping the throne of Iran in 1736, marking the foundation of the Afsharid dynasty). Agha Mohammad Khan had several half-brothers and full-brothers: Hossein Qoli Khan, Morteza Qoli Khan, Mostafa Qoli Khan, Reza Qoli Khan, Jafar Qoli Khan, Mehdi Qoli Khan, Abbas Qoli Khan and Ali Qoli Khan.

When Nader Shah died in 1747, the Afsharid rule of Iran fell apart, which gave Mohammad Hasan an opportunity to seize Astarabad for himself, leading Nader Shah's nephew Adel Shah to march from Mashhad to the city in order to capture him. Although he failed to capture Hasan, Adel Shah managed to capture Agha Mohammad Khan, whom he had castrated and thereafter freed.

According to some sources, the title Agha in Agha Mohammad Khan's name was a reference to the fact that he was a eunuch. Agha (spelled آغا, with the letter ghayn) is a respectful term of Turkic origin for a woman; it was also used to refer to eunuchs employed at the royal court. Aqa (spelled آقا, with the letter qaf), also of Turkic origin, means 'master, elder, older brother, etc.' (Note: In contemporary Persian, aqa is a regular term of address for men, equivalent to English mister. Maziar Behrooz rejects Saeed Nafisi's assertion that the two terms were not distinguished in spelling in the original Turkic.) According to Maziar Behrooz, the use of the spelling Agha as in 'eunuch' in Agha Mohammad's name began only in the Pahlavi period as "a means of humiliating [Agha Mohammad] and his dynasty". Agha Mohammad's enemies did, however, use many insulting terms which referred to his condition, such as Akhta Khan ('the castrated khan').

=== Death of Mohammad Hasan ===
During the following ten years, Afsharid rule in Khorasan suffered heavily from war among rival chieftains and from invasions by the Durrani ruler of Qandahar, Ahmad Shah Durrani. During this period, Mohammad Hasan fought against the Pashtun military leader Azad Khan Afghan and the Zand ruler Karim Khan for suzerainty over the western part of Nader Shah's former empire. He was, however, defeated in 1759 by a Zand army. He was betrayed by his own followers and thereafter, killed by his old rival, Mohammad Khan of Savadkuh. Due to Agha Mohammad Khan's castration, his brother Hossein Qoli Khan was appointed as the new chieftain of the Quwanlu instead. Shortly thereafter Astarabad fell under the control of Karim Khan, who appointed a Develu named Hossein Khan Develu as its governor. Meanwhile, Agha Mohammad Khan and his brother Hossein Qoli Khan fled to the steppe. One year later, Agha Mohammad Khan made an incursion against Astarabad, but was forced to flee, chased by the city's governor. Agha Mohammad Khan managed to reach Ashraf, but was at last seized and sent as a hostage to Tehran, ruled by Karim Khan. Hossein Qoli Khan was also soon captured and sent to Karim Khan.

=== Life at court ===
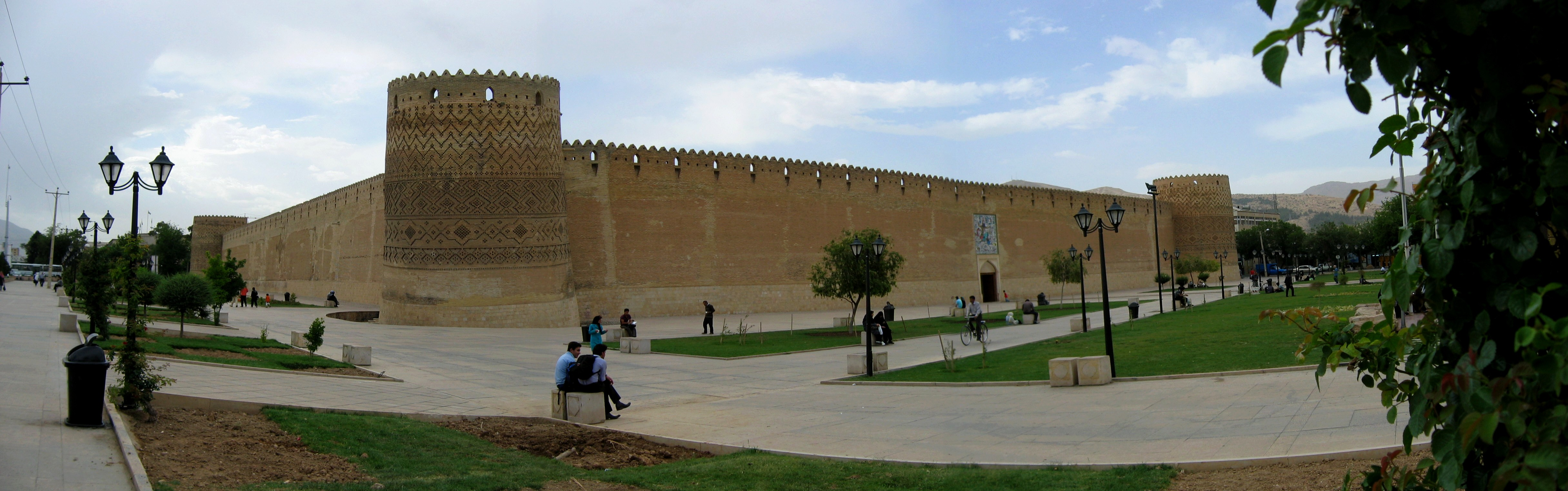
Picture of the Arg of Karim Khan, the royal residence of the Zand dynasty, where Agha Mohammad Khan spent most of his time during his "captivity".

During his stay, Agha Mohammad Khan was treated kindly and honorably by Karim Khan, who made him convince his kinsmen to lay down their arms, which they did. Karim Khan then settled them in Damghan. In 1763, Agha Mohammad Khan and Hossein Qoli Khan were sent to the Zand capital, Shiraz, where their paternal aunt Khadija Begum, who was part of Karim Khan's harem, lived. Agha Mohammad Khan's half-brothers Morteza Qoli Khan and Mostafa Qoli Khan were granted permission to live in Astarabad, due to their mother being the sister of the governor of the city. His remaining brothers were sent to Qazvin, where they were treated honorably.

Agha Mohammad Khan was looked upon more as a respected guest in Karim Khan's court than a captive. Furthermore, Karim Khan also acknowledged Agha Mohammad Khan's political knowledge and sought his advice on interests of the state. He called Agha Mohammad Khan his "Piran-e Viseh", referring to an intelligent counselor of the mythical Turanian king Afrasiab in the Shahnameh epic. Two of Agha Mohammad Khan's brothers who were at Qazvin were also sent to Shiraz during this period. In February 1769, Karim Khan appointed Hossein Qoli Khan as the governor of Damghan. When Hossein Qoli Khan reached Damghan, he immediately began a fierce conflict with the Develu and other tribes to avenge his father's death. He was, however, killed c. 1777 near Findarisk by some Turks from the Yamut tribe with whom he had clashed. On 1 March 1779, while Agha Mohammad Khan was hunting, he was informed by Khadija Begum that Karim Khan had died after six months of illness.

== Rise to power and unification of Iran (1779–1789) ==
=== Conquest of Mazandaran and Gilan ===
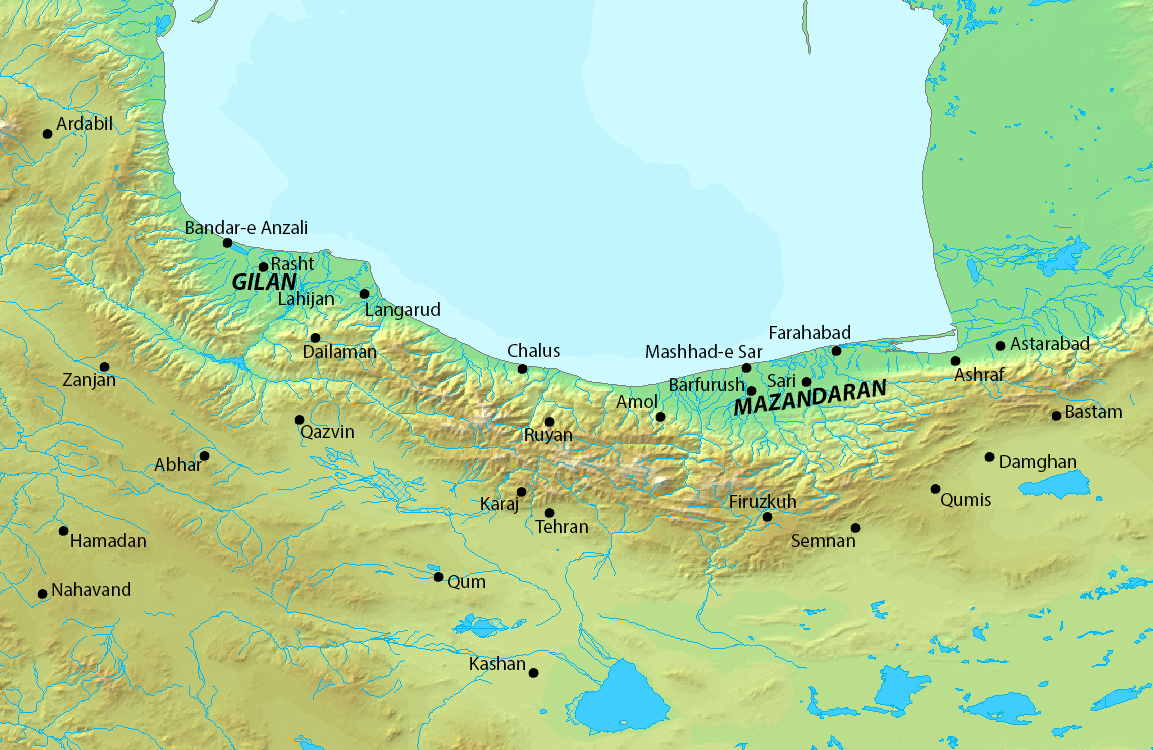
Northern Iran

Agha Mohammad Khan took with him a group of loyal followers and left for Tehran. Meanwhile, in Shiraz, people were fighting among themselves. In Tehran, Agha Mohammad Khan met the main chieftains of the Develu clan, with whom he made peace. He visited Shah Abdol-Azim Shrine, where his father's skull was kept. He then travelled to the Mazandaran province, where his first task was to set up his suzerainty among his Quwanlu brothers. This resulted in a clash with his brothers Reza Qoli and Morteza Qoli, whom he defeated on 2 April, conquering Mazandaran. Meanwhile, Morteza Qoli fled to Astarabad, where he fortified himself. Agha Mohammad Khan could not simply storm the city, since starting a war with Morteza Qoli would mean that his frail alliance with the Develu could fall apart—Morteza Qoli's mother was a Develu. At the same time, the Zand prince Ali-Morad Khan Zand sent an army of Zand and Afghan troops under Azad Khan Afghan's son Mahmud Khan to Mazandaran, which Agha Mohammad Khan's brother Jafar Qoli Khan managed to repel. Agha Mohammad Khan, together with Hossein Qoli Khan's sons Fath-Ali Qoli and Hosayn Qoli, was now in a firm position in Babol, the capital of Mazandaran.

In Autumn 1780 Reza Qoli invaded Babol with an army of men from Larijan, where he encircled Agha Mohammad Khan's house and captured him after a fight lasting several hours. When Morteza Qoli learned of this, he marched to Babol on 1 January 1781 with an army of Turkmens and released Agha Mohammad Khan. Agha Mohammad Khan and Reza Qoli were initially reconciled, but the latter was still discontented and fled to Ali-Morad Khan in Isfahan, and then to Sadeq Khan Zand in Shiraz. He died in Khorasan, and his former supporters went over to Agha Mohammad's side and fought with him against Morteza Qoli, who sought to take Mazandaran. Agha Mohammad defeated his brother but agreed to let him rule Astarabad and collect revenue from several districts in Mazandaran

Peace did not last long. Ali-Morad Khan soon invaded Mazandaran, which led Agha Mohammad Khan to march from Babol with an army of Mazandaranis and Qajars and attack Ali-Morad Khan, whom he managed to repel from the province. Agha Mohammad Khan then seized Qumis, Semnan, Damghan, Shahrud and Bastam. Furthermore, he also made Hedayat-Allah Khan, the ruler of Gilan, his vassal. He thereafter granted land in Semnan to his brother Ali Qoli as a reward for his help in the conquest of the cities.

=== First conflict with the Russians, dispute with Gilan, and the invasion of northern Persian Iraq ===
In 1781, the Russian Empire, which was interested in building a trade route with Iran in order to be able to trade with regions deep into Asia, sent an emissary under Marko Ivanovich Voinovich to the coast of Gorgan, where he arrived on 10 August and sought approval to build a trading-post at Ashraf. When Agha Mohammad Khan refused, Voinovich ignored his refusal and went on to establish an interim settlement on Ashurada island. With no ships, Agha Mohammad Khan was unable to retake the island. Instead, he tricked Voinovich and some of his men into meeting him at Astarabad for a banquet on 26 December, where they were held as captives until Voinovich agreed to order his men to leave Ashurada on 13 January 1782.

A year later Agha Mohammad Khan invaded Gilan, because its ruler Hedayat-Allah had changed his allegiance to the Zand dynasty. Hedayat-Allah then sent two diplomats, Mirza Sadeq and Agha Sadeq Lahiji, to Agha Mohammad to make peace. As a precaution he went to Shirvan. The diplomats were unable to come to favorable terms with Agha Mohammad Khan, who raided Gilan's capital Rasht and seized its riches. Rejoicing in his victory, he sent his brother Jafar Qoli Khan to conquer the northern part of Persian Iraq. He defeated a Zand army in Ray (or Karaj), and thereafter seized Qazvin. He then marched to Zanjan, which he also seized.In autumn they returned to Mazandaran. In the spring of 1783, Agha Mohammad Khan besieged Tehran, a town under Zand control which had proved troublesome. During the siege, plague started spreading in the town, and thereafter to Agha Mohammad Khan's army camp outside the city, which forced him to lift the siege. He marched back to Ali Bolagh, a summer house near Damghan. Agha Mohammad Khan then returned to Mazandaran and spent the winter there.

=== Mazandaran's brief submission to the Zand dynasty ===
The next year Ali-Morad Khan, in retaliation for Agha Mohammad Khan's attack on Tehran the previous year sent a huge army reportedly numbering 60,000 to Mazandaran in June 1784, aiming to crush the Qajars once and for all. His 15-year-old son Sheikh Veis Khan was put in command of the army, with Ali Morad staying behind in Tehran. When the army arrived in Mazandaran, its people quickly surrendered to the Zands and the nobles defected. Agha Mohammad Khan and a few of his supporters fled to Astarabad, where he tried to fortify the city as much as possible. Meanwhile, Morteza Qoli changed his allegiance and began serving the Zand dynasty. Ali-Morad Khan then sent an army numbering 8,000 under his relative Mohammad Zahir Khan to Astarabad, and laid siege to the city. Agha Mohammad Khan had already stocked provisions in case of a siege. Every day his troops would try to lay waste to the countryside to limit the besiegers' provisions. This in the end made the besiegers' situation unsustainable, and allowed Agha Mohammad Khan to leave the city to attack them. Mohammad Zahir Khan fled towards the Karakum Desert, but was captured by Agha Mohammad Khan's Yomut allies and was brutally killed. Only a few of his men managed to survive. On 14 November Agha Mohammad marched from Astarabad into Mazandaran and defeated a Zand force at Ashraf. The Zands were unable to defend Sari and Sheikh Veis Khan fled to Tehran on 23 November.

=== First war with Jafar Khan Zand ===
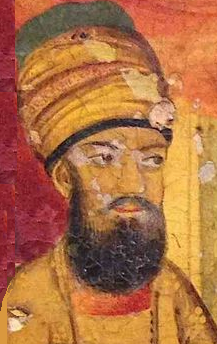
Portrait of Jafar Khan Zand

Meanwhile, Ali-Morad Khan had raised another group of Zand troops, which he sent to Mazandaran under the command of his cousin Rustam Khan Zand, only to be defeated by Agha Mohammad Khan. Ali-Morad Khan died on 11 February 1785. When Agha Mohammad Khan heard of his death, he went to Tehran to try to capture it. When he reached the city, the inhabitants quickly closed the gates, and told him that they would open the gate only for the king of Iran, who according to them was Jafar Khan Zand, who had succeeded Ali-Morad Khan. Thus Agha Mohammad Khan had to defeat Jafar Khan to be recognized as the king of Iran. He thereafter quickly marched towards Isfahan. Jafar Khan sent men to stop his advance towards the city, but they withdrew at Qom without putting up any resistance. Jafar Khan then sent an even larger Zand army towards Agha Mohammad Khan, who defeated the army near Kashan. Jafar Khan then fled to Shiraz. Agha Mohammad arrived at Isfahan on 2 May, where he discovered what was left of the Zand treasure and Jafar Khan's harem. The Qajar troops then looted the city.

During the summer of 1785, Agha Mohammad Khan made the city his headquarters for his expeditions in Persian Iraq. He left Isfahan on 7 July on a campaign in which he managed to bring the Bakhtiari chieftains under his suzerainty. He then left for Tehran on 2 September, appointing a former Zand commander to govern. When he arrived at Tehran, the town finally submitted to him. At the same time, his men captured Hamadan and forced many Kurdish and Turkic chieftains to submit to Qajar rule. On 12 March 1786, Agha Mohammad Khan made Tehran his capital. By then the city had a population of 15,000–30,000 people. It appears that during this period, Agha Mohammad Khan saw himself as the king of Iran, although he avoided using the title "shah".

Some time later, while Agha Mohammad Khan Qajar was campaigning against the Bakhtiaris, Jafar Khan quickly marched towards Isfahan and re-captured it (although the citadel of Tabrak held out for four months). He then sent troops towards Kashan and Qom, while he marched towards Hamadan in early January 1786. He was, however, defeated by local tribal chieftains, among them Khosrow Khan and Mohammad Hosayn Khan Qaragozlu. Jafar Khan then withdrew to Isfahan to deal with a rebellion by the chiefs of Jandaq, who marched towards the city. The chiefs were defeated and submitted to Jafar Khan. When Agha Mohammad Khan heard about the Zand invasion of Isfahan and its surroundings, he quickly moved towards the city, which made Jafar Khan retreat to Shiraz once again. Agha Mohammad Khan then appointed Jafar Qoli Khan as the city's governor. However, the governor of Zanjan revolted shortly afterward, which forced Agha Mohammad Khan to go back north, where he suppressed the latter's revolt and pardoned him.

=== Second invasion of Gilan ===
Agha Mohammad Khan now had to focus on Gilan because Hedayat-Allah Khan had returned to the province (allegedly with Russian help) since the Qajar invasion of the province in 1782. In Agha Mohammad Khan's eyes, the whole Caspian coast was under threat by Hedayat-Allah and the Russians. Agha Mohammad Khan and his men easily managed to enter Gilan. While he was marching towards Rasht, he was joined by a local ruler named Mehdi Beg Khalatbari and other people. Furthermore, the Russian consul in Gilan betrayed Hedayat-Allah by providing weapons to Agha Mohammad Khan. Hedayat-Allah once again tried to flee to Shirvan, but was captured by men sent by a local ruler named Agha Ali Shafti (or another local ruler according to some sources), who killed him to avenge the slaughter of his family a few years earlier. Gilan was now completely under Qajar rule. Besides the conquest of Gilan, the second most valuable thing for Agha Mohammad Khan was Hedayat-Allah's treasure.

=== Second war with Jafar Khan Zand and enthronement ===
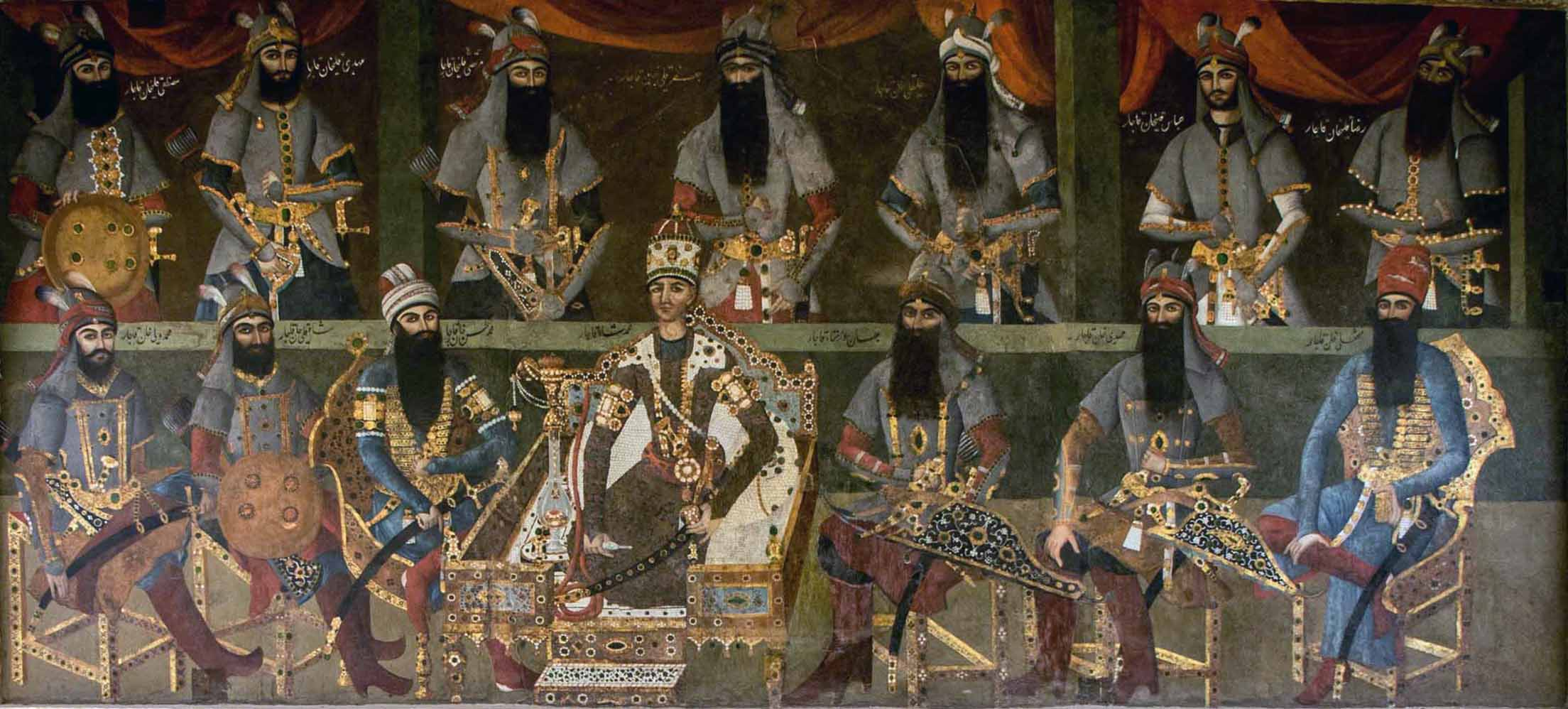
Painting of Agha Mohammad Khan with his men

Some time later a local ruler named Amir Mohammad Khan, who with another local ruler named Taqi Khan (the ruler of Yazd), had recently defeated Jafar Khan and seized many riches, invaded Qajar territory, and marched towards Isfahan. Jafar Qoli Khan, who was still the governor of Isfahan, left the city before Taqi Khan could reach it and defeated the latter. Agha Mohammad Khan then went southwards once again. He met Jafar Qoli Khan at Isfahan in 1788, and after some time, made Taqi Khan accept Qajar suzerainty, and thereafter punished some Qashqai tribes, who fled into the mountains. Agha Mohammad Khan then approached Shiraz, where he hoped to bait Jafar Khan out of the city, which was strongly fortified, making it very hard to besiege. Unfortunately for him, Jafar Khan remained in the city. Agha Mohammad Khan returned to Isfahan, where he appointed his brother Ali Qoli as its governor, succeeding Jafar Qoli Khan. He then left for Tehran.

With Agha Mohammad Khan once again in the north, in autumn Jafar Khan began raising an army to prepare another attack against Isfahan and its surroundings. Jafar left Shiraz on 20 September and marched towards Isfahan. When Ali Qoli learned of it he sent a group of tribesmen to Qumishah, a city south of Isfahan. However, Jafar Khan easily defeated them. Ali Qoli thereafter retreated to Kashan. Jafar Khan was then able to occupy Isfahan on 20 October. Agha Mohammad Khan, learning of this, marched rapidly towards Isfahan, which led Jafar Khan withdraw to Shiraz once again and reached the city on 30 November. Agha Mohammad Khan returned to Tehran rather than attacking Shiraz again. Jafar Khan was murdered on 23 January 1789, which started a four-month civil war between several Zand princes who fought for succession to the throne. In May Jafar Khan's son Lotf Ali Khan emerged the victor in this civil war. Lotf Ali Khan fled to Bushehr and managed to recruit the local chiefs of Dashestan to his side. Lotf Ali was able to march against Seyd Morad Khan on 22 April and enter Shiraz on 8 May.

It was also during this period that Agha Mohammad Khan was enthroned (however still not crowned) and named his nephew Baba Khan (who would later be known as Fath-Ali Shah Qajar) as his heir. Thus 1789 is marked as the start of his reign.

== Reign (1789–1797) ==
=== War with Lotf Ali Khan, family disputes, and the first invasion of Azerbaijan ===
==== First attack on Shiraz and dispute with Jafar Qoli Khan Qajar ====
Now that the Zand dynasty was no longer under the rule of Jafar Khan Zand, Agha Mohammad Khan saw an opportunity to capture Shiraz once and for all. He marched towards the city and was attacked by Lotf Ali Khan as he neared it. A battle was fought on 25 June 1789, which ended in Lotf Ali Khan withdrawing to Shiraz while Agha Mohammad Khan followed him and besieged the city. The siege lasted until 7 September. He set up an encampment and returned to Tehran, where he stayed until the end of the ensuing Nowruz. On 17 May 1790, Agha Mohammad Khan once again marched towards Shiraz. When he reached Fars, the governor of Bihbahan acknowledged his authority. Lotf Ali Khan once again left Shiraz in order to stop Agha Mohammad Khan's advance, but the Qajar ruler withdrew to Qazvin and its surroundings, where he had to resolve some problems. Agha Mohammad Khan later quarreled with Jafar Qoli Khan, who saw himself as the best heir of the Qajar dynasty. Agha Mohammad had him executed, which he believed necessary having seen in the Zand family how quickly a dynasty could decline due to disputes over the throne.

==== Invasion of Azerbaijan ====
While Lotf Ali Khan was having problems with Kerman, Agha Mohammad Khan could thus freely focus on Azerbaijan. He appointed Baba Khan as the governor of Persian Iraq and marched into Azerbaijan in the spring of 1791. He stopped at Tarum, and sent his relative Soleyman Khan Qajar to make the Talysh Khanate acknowledge Qajar authority. Agha Mohammad Khan thereafter went to Sarab, where he forced the Sarab Khanate into submission. He then went to Ardabil, where he subdued the Ardabil Khanate and visited the city's shrine. He finally went to Qaradagh, where he brought an end to all resistance against him. He appointed the Donboli noble Hosayn Qoli Donboli as the governor of Khoy and Tabriz.

=== Conquest of Fars ===
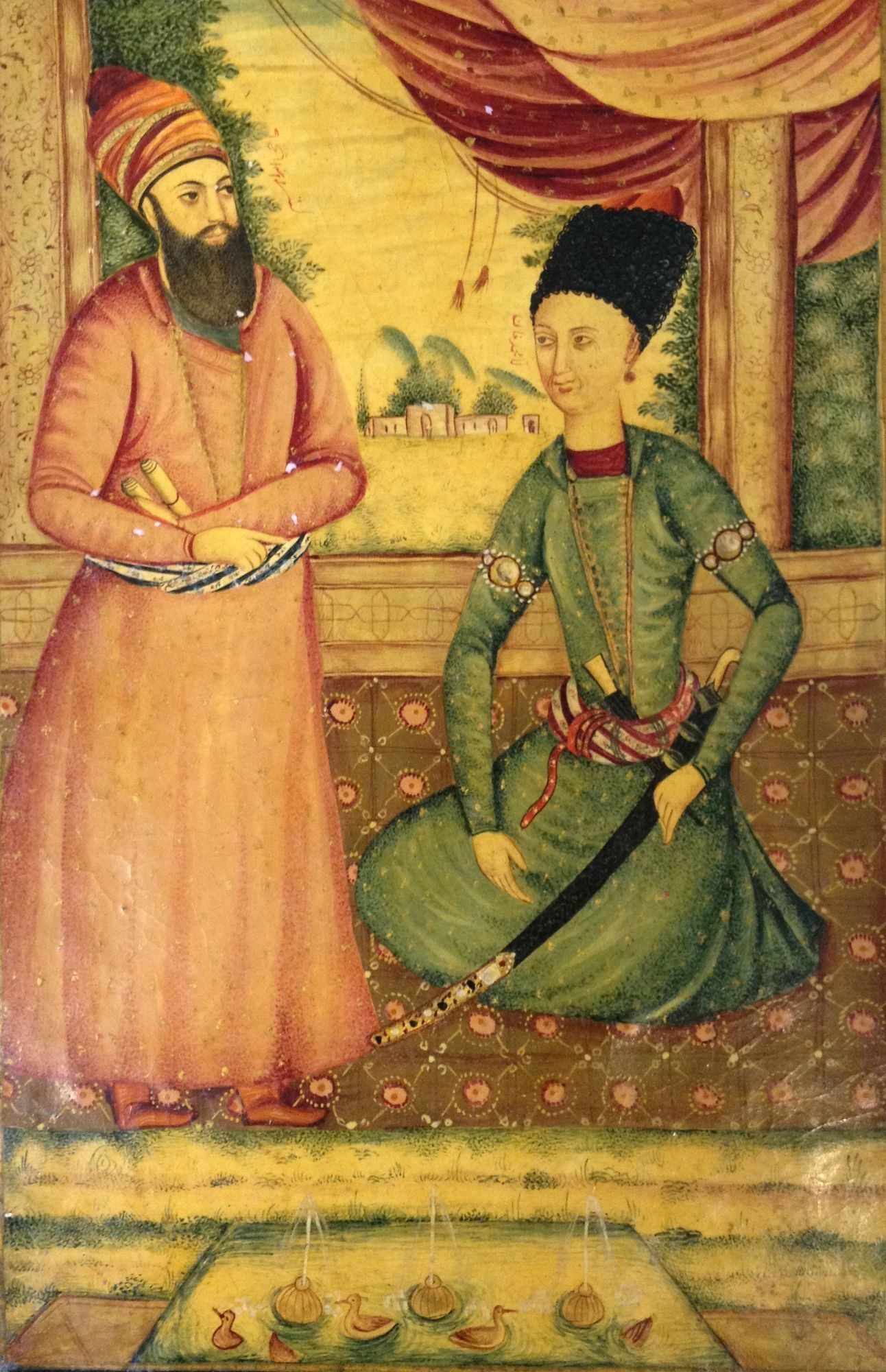
Painting of Agha Mohammad Shah (right) and his grand vizier Hajji Ebrahim Shirazi (left)

While Agha Mohammad Khan was conquering Azerbaijan, Lotf Ali Khan used the opportunity to attack Isfahan. However Hajji Ebrahim Shirazi, the popular governor of Shiraz, used Lotf Ali Khan's absence from the city to stage a coup, while his brother Mohammad-Hosayn Shirazi, who was the Zand ruler's general, mutinied along with many other troops. Lotf Ali Khan rushed to Shiraz, but when he arrived at the city, its inhabitants refused to open the gates. He went into the mountains and raised an army large enough to capture Shiraz. Hajji Ebrahim then sent an emissary to Agha Mohammad Khan, asking him to become the ruler of Fars, offering to give him 3,000 mares if he accepted; he immediately did. When Agha Mohammad Khan arrived at Fars, he appointed Hajji Ebrahim as the governor of the whole province, and sent one of his men to take Lotf Ali Khan's family to Tehran, and take the possessions of the Zand family. Furthermore, he also ordered Baba Khan to establish a garrison in nearby Shiraz to be prepared to help Hajji Ebrahim if needed.

The Sheikh of Bushehr also took this opportunity to defect to the Qajars, although the reason for doing so is disputed. Sheikh Naser II managed to establish control over Dashtestan, Kharg and Bandar Rig. He also attempted to take Khesht from January to June 1792, but his attempt to capture it failed and he returned to Bushehr on 27 June.

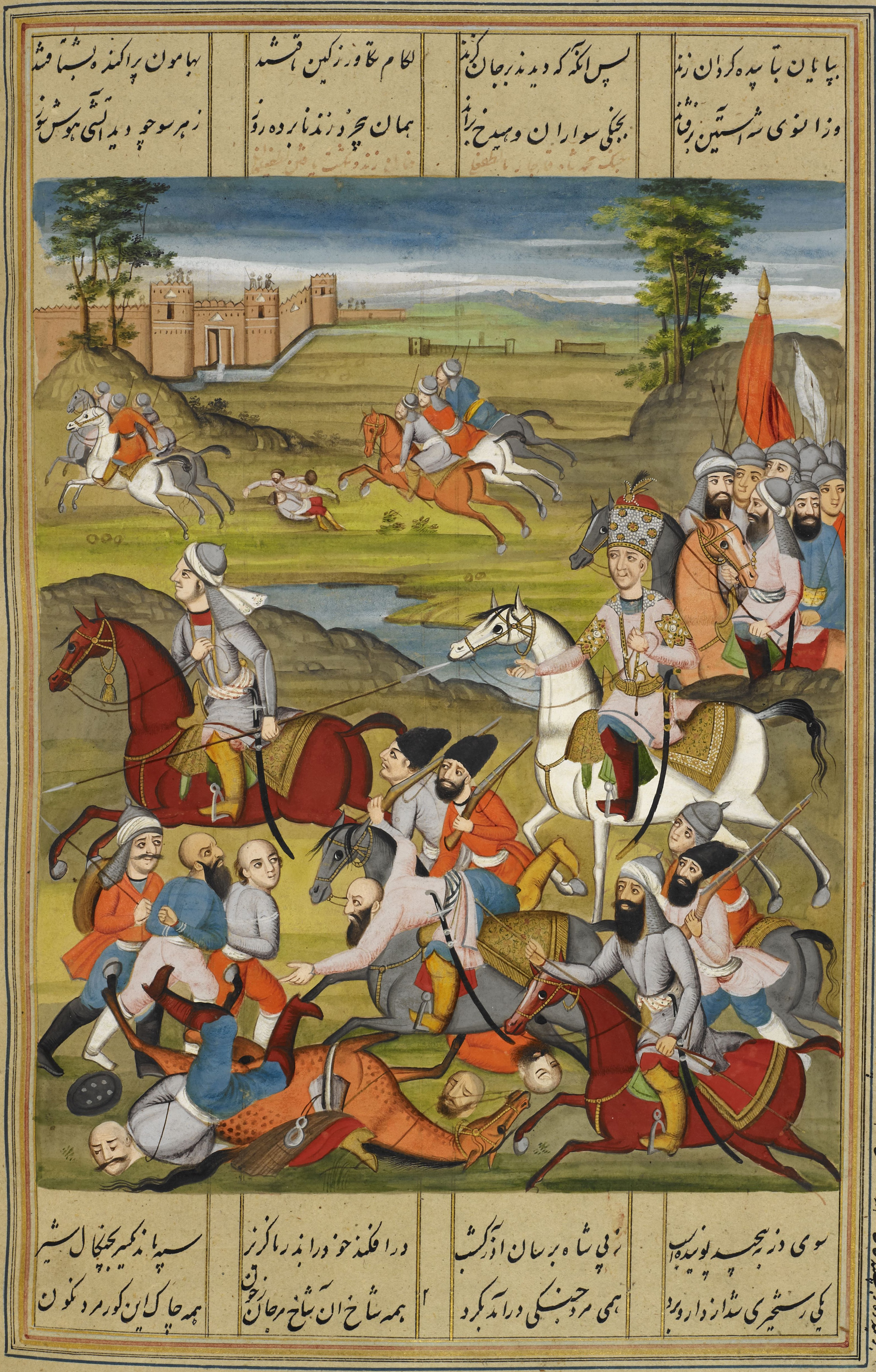
Defeat of Lotf 'Ali Khan by Agha Mohammad Khan; the city of Shiraz in the background. Folio from the Shahanshahnameh of Fath 'Ali Khan Saba, dated 1810

In the meantime, Lotf Ali Khan had defeated the men sent by Hajji Ebrahim and had advanced towards the stronghold of Kazerun in late October and captured it. He then marched to the countryside outside Shiraz and prepared to starve the city. Some time later, the Qajar army from the nearby garrison attacked Lotf Ali Khan's men and were winning—until Lotf Ali Khan himself decided to participate in the battle, and the Qajar army was defeated. When Agha Mohammad Khan learned of this, he sent 7,000 horsemen to reinforce Hajji Ebrahim's forces, and also ordered the surviving Qajar forces from the nearby garrison to do the same.

Lotf Ali Khan let the reinforcements arrive to Shiraz, expecting that as soon as the forces of Hajji Ebrahim were strengthened, they would come out of Shiraz, and could be overwhelmed in open battle. He was correct in his prediction—a battle shortly took place to the west of Shiraz, where Lotf Ali Khan defeated the united forces of Hajji Ebrahim and his Qajar reinforcements. This took place in late 1791, or early 1792.

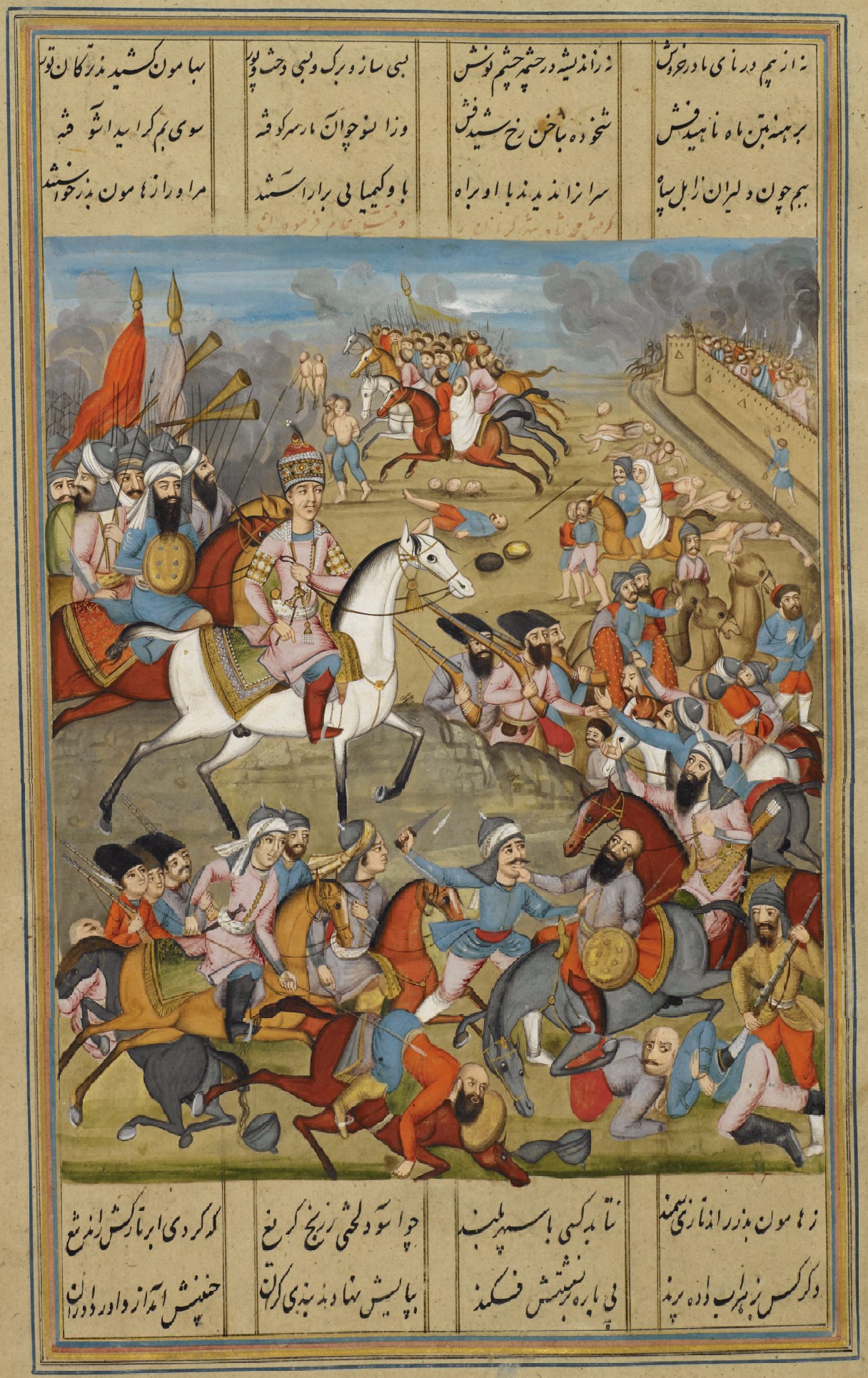
Agha Mohammad Khan's capture and sack of Kerman

The inhabitants of Shiraz now faced extreme hardship from the siege, and it was questionable if they would endure. Large parts of Fars were ravaged by warfare, and for three to four years a pandemic had spread around the landscape. Albeit Lotf Ali Khan's forces had gone through as much difficulty as the forces of Hajji Ebrahim whose forces had begun to desert to the Zands. Agha Mohammad Khan thus raised a large army and marched into Fars. On 5 June 1792, Lotf Ali Khan, with a small force of his men, made a bold night raid on Agha Mohammad Khan's encampment near Persepolis.

At first, this choice seemed to be in Lotf Ali Khan's favor—he was certain that the Qajars were routed. In his delight at this, he let his men spread out and rest for the night, only to discover at daybreak that Agha Mohammad Khan still held his ground. Lotf Ali Khan then fled to Tabas through Neyriz. Agha Mohammad Khan set foot in Shiraz on 21 July 1792, and stayed there for a month, maintaining his retinue in the Bagh-e Vakil. Before leaving Shiraz, he appointed Hajji Ebrahim as the governor of Fars, and had the body of Karim Khan Zand exhumed and reburied in Tehran, where he went after his stay in Shiraz. Forces were sent to Kerman, Sistan, and Bam (although Qajar rule was not solidified in the last two places).

=== Conquest of Kerman ===
Lotf Ali Khan had fled to Khorasan and received help from the chief of Tabas. With this help, he returned in September and marched towards Yazd. The governor of Yazd sent an army to defeat him, but near Ardakan they fled back to Yazd before an engagement even took place. Lotf Ali then captured Abarkuh and marched towards Bavanat in early October. The Qajar force sent against him wasted time besieging Abarkuh and Lotf Ali captured Stahbanat, Qir, and Neyriz. He marched on Darab and besieged the fortress but was soon informed of the Qajar army sent against him and fled back to Khorasan.

The Afghan chiefs of Bam invited Lotf Ali Khan to return and expel the Qajar yoke. With their help, Lotf Ali Khan returned to Kerman and captured the city on 30 March. Agha Mohammad Khan quickly heard of this and marched towards Kerman on 14 May. The siege lasted four months and took a toll on Kerman's population. The city fell on 24 October, and Lotf Ali Khan quickly fled to Bam. However, the chief of Bam ordered Lotf Ali Khan to be killed and given to the Qajars. Agha Mohammad Khan took revenge on the people of Kerman by ordering thousands of the inhabitants to be blinded (numbers vary from "ordering to provide 20,000 eyes of the inhabitants" to "7,000 people to be blinded".) The city was brutally sacked and many beautiful buildings destroyed.

=== Reconquest of Georgia and the rest of the Caucasus ===
In May 1795, Agha Mohammad Khan set out for Azerbaijan with an army of 60,000 cavalry and infantry. His goal was to reassert Iranian rule north of the Aras River. This region was divided between several semi-independent khanates (provinces) and districts, the most important of which were Karabakh, Ganja, Shirvan, and the Georgian kingdom of Kartli-Kakheti. Though viewed by Iranian rulers as integral parts of Iran, Iranian control over the territories north of the Aras had been "completely eroded" in the mid-18th century. In 1783, King Heraclius II of Kartli-Kakheti signed the Treaty of Georgievsk with the Russian Empire, in which he renounced his kingdom's dependency on Iran and accepted a Russian protectorate; in Iranian eyes, this was an act of treason by the vali of Georgia (as the king of Georgia was known to Iranians). Agha Mohammad Khan viewed Georgia no differently than other Iranian territories such as Khorasan and Fars and was intent on preventing its permanent loss.

Agha Mohammad Khan divided his army into three as he reached the Aras: the left wing was sent in the direction of Erivan; the right wing moved parallel to the Caspian Sea into the Mughan plain and across the lower Aras towards Dagestan and Shirvan; the centre, commanded by Agha Mohammad himself, advanced towards the fortress of Shusha in the Karabakh Khanate, which he besieged between 8 July and 9 August 1795. Agha Mohammad met stiff resistance in Shusha, and his main goal was the conquest of Georgia, so he accepted a settlement with Ibrahim Khan of Karabakh, receiving his formal submission and hostages, but without being allowed to enter Shusha. His army moved on to Ganja and received the submission of its ruler, Javad Khan. He was joined by the right wing, which had subdued Quba. At Ganja, Mohammad Khan sent Heraclius II his last ultimatum, which he received in September 1795:

Your Highness knows that for the past 100 generations you have been subject to Iran; now we deign to say with amazement that you have attached yourself to the Russians, who have no other business than to trade with Iran... Last year you forced me to destroy a number of Georgians, although we had no desire at all for our subjects to perish by our own hand... It is now our great will that you, an intelligent man, abandon such things... and break relations with the Russians. If you do not carry out this order, then we shall shortly carry out a campaign against Georgia, we will shed both Georgian and Russian blood and out of it will create rivers as big as the Kura....

According to the author of the Fārsnāma-ye Nāṣeri, Hasan-e Fasa'i, a contemporary Qajar-era historian, Agha Mohammad Khan had declared in the letter:

Shah Ismail I Safavi ruled over the province of Georgia. When in the days of the deceased king we were engaged in conquering the provinces of Iran, we did not proceed to this region. As most of the provinces of Iran have come into our possession now, you must, according to ancient law, consider Georgia (Gurjistan) part of the empire, and appear before our majesty. You have to conform your obedience; then you may remain in the possession of your governorship (wali) of Georgia. If you do not do this, you will be treated as the others.

His advisors divided, Heraclius II ignored the ultimatum but sent couriers to Saint Petersburg. The Russian general Gudovich, who sat in Georgievsk at the time, had been instructed to avoid "expense and fuss". Heraclius II, together with Solomon II and some Imeretians headed southwards of Tbilisi to fend off the Iranians.

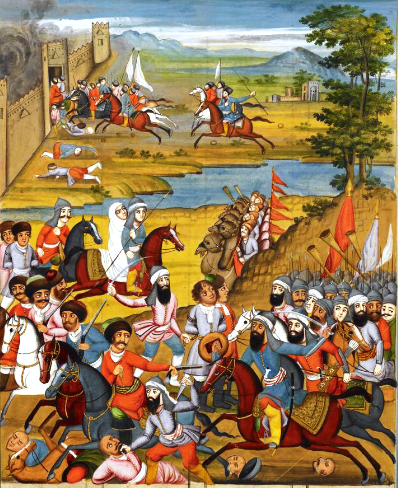
The capture of Tbilisi by Agha Mohammad Khan. A Qajar-era Persian miniature from the British Library.

At the same time, Agha Mohammad Khan marched directly on Tbilisi, with half of the army with which he had crossed the Aras river. Some estimate his army had 40,000 men instead of 35,000. They attacked the heavily fortified Georgian positions of Heraclius II and Solomon on the southwestern limits of the city. Abandoned by several of his nobles, Heraclius II managed to mobilize around 5,000 troops, including some 2,000 auxiliaries from the neighbouring Imereti under its King Solomon II, a member of the Georgian Bagrationi dynasty and thus distantly related to Heraclius II. The Georgians offered a desperate resistance and succeeded in rolling back a series of Iranian attacks on 9 and 10 September. After that, it is said that some traitors informed the Iranians that the Georgians had no more strength to fight and the Qajar army cancelled their plan of returning to Iran. Early on 11 September, Agha Mohammad Khan personally led an all-out offensive against the Georgians. Amid an artillery duel and a fierce cavalry charge, the Iranians managed to cross the Kura River and outflanked the decimated Georgian army. Heraclius II attempted to mount a counterattack, but he had to retreat to the last available positions in the outskirts of Tbilisi. By nightfall, the Georgian forces had been exhausted and almost completely destroyed. The last surviving Georgian artillery briefly held the advancing Iranians to allow Heraclius II and his retinue of some 150 men to escape through the city to the mountains. The fighting continued in the streets of Tbilisi and at the fortress of Narikala. In a few hours, Agha Mohammad Khan was in full control of the Georgian capital, which was then completely sacked and its population massacred. The Iranian army marched back laden with spoil and carrying off some 15,000 captives. The Georgians had lost 4,000 men in the battle, the Iranians 13,000, a third of their total force.

An eyewitness, having entered the city several days the bulk of the Iranian troops had withdrawn, described what he saw:

I therefore pursued my way, paved as it were, with carcases, and entered Tiflis by the gate of Tapitag: but what was my consternation on finding here the bodies of women and children slaughtered by the sword of the enemy; to say nothing about the men, of whom I saw more than a thousand, as I should suppose, lying dead in one little tower! [...] The city was almost entirely consumed, and still continued to smoke in different places; and the stench from the putrefying, together with the heat which prevailed, was intolerable, and certainly infectious.

Agha Mohammad's army then pillaged the countryside of Karabakh and Shirvan. Extreme famine struck the region, and many inhabitants fled their homes. He then set up his winter quarters on the Mughan plain, where Nader Shah had been crowned sixty years earlier. The Qajar chiefs and high-ranking officials, led by Hajji Ibrahim, requested that he take the title of Shah. Agha Mohammad is supposed to have responded, "If, according to your desire, I put the crown on my head, this will cause you, in the beginning, toil and hardship, as I take no pleasure in bearing the title of king as long as I am not one of the greatest kings of Persia. This petition will not be granted but by toil and fatigue." In accordance with Safavid custom, he girded the sword of Shah Ismail after it had been hung from the tomb-chamber of Shaikh Safi in Ardabil the day before, and the crown was placed on his head.

=== Conquest of Khorasan ===
Agha Mohammad Shah now focused on Khorasan, which was under the rule of Nader Shah's blind and old grandson Shahrokh Shah. He had earlier been a vassal of the Durrani ruler, Ahmad Shah, but after the latter's death in 1772 had become a pawn of the chieftains who had taken control of the surrounding cities and towns of the Afsharid capital of Mashhad. The most prominent of these chieftains was most likely Eshaq Khan, who preserved Torbat-e Heydarieh as his center of operations. In the eastern parts of the Alborz, Kurdish chieftains ruled over several fortresses, such as Bojnord and Quchan.

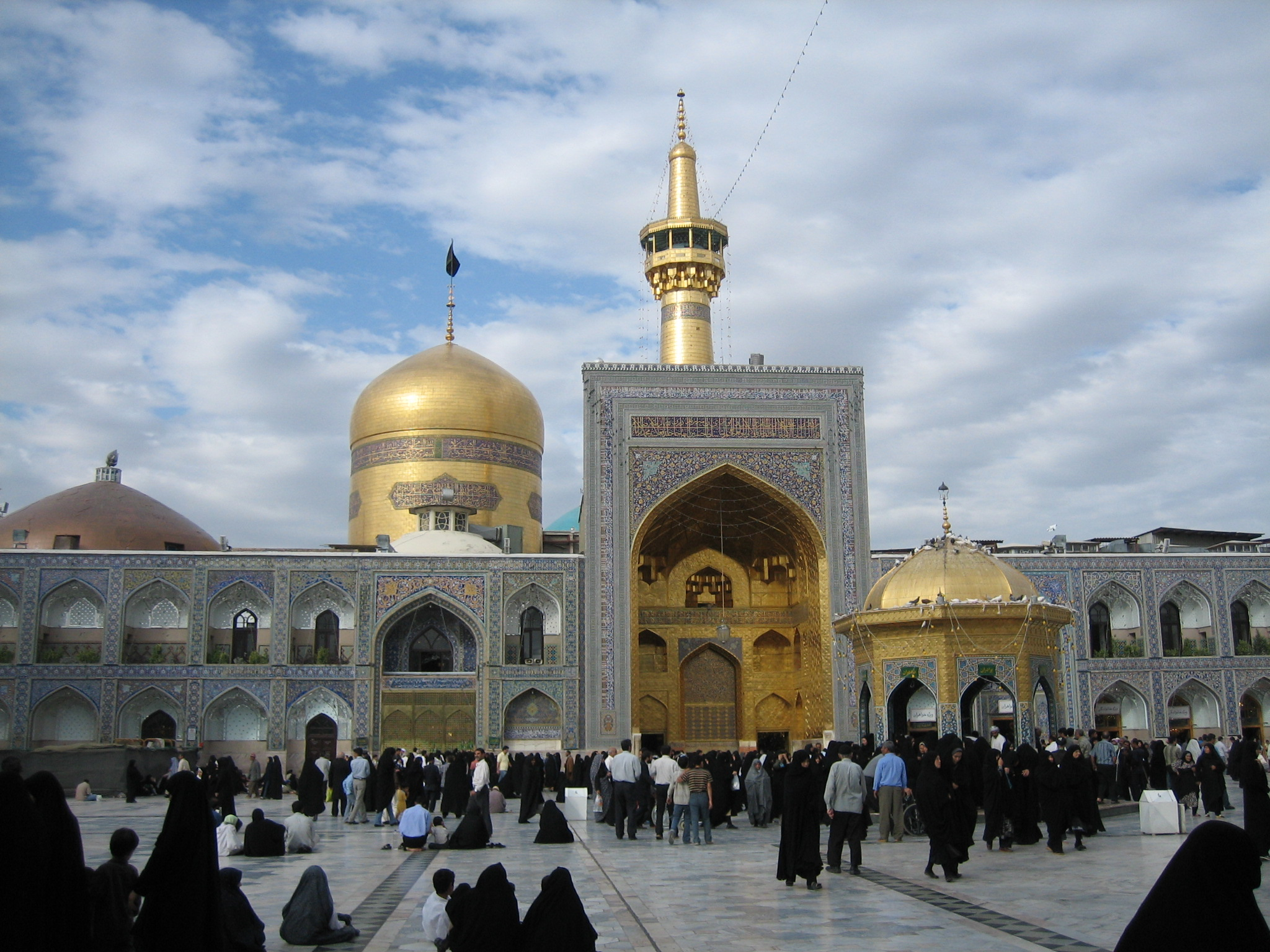
The Imam Reza shrine in Mashhad.

Agha Mohammad Shah first marched to Astarabad, and penalized the Turkmens who had been pillaging the city and its surroundings. He then continued to Mashhad, where the local chieftains, who knew it was hopeless to resist, swiftly acknowledged his rule. Agha Mohammad Shah also demanded these local chieftains to dispatch him hostages, who were sent to Tehran. When Agha Mohammad Shah reached Mashhad, Shahrokh, along with a prominent mujtahid named Mirza Mehdi, went to the Qajar encampment. There they were warmly received by Agha Mohammad Shah's nephew Hossein Qoli Khan.

Shortly afterwards, Agha Mohammad Shah sent a force of 8,000 soldiers under Soleyman Khan Qajar, followed by Mirza Mehdi, to conquer Mashhad and affirm its citizens of the Shah's generosity. A day later, Agha Mohammad Shah, followed the customary of the famous Iranian shah Abbas the Great, and entered Mashhad on 14 May by foot as a pilgrim to the Imam Reza shrine, whilst being teary eyed and kissing the ground. His pilgrimage continued for 23 days, where he seemed to be unaware of the politics of the country.

==== The torture of Shahrokh Shah ====
However, things quickly changed. Agha Mohammad Shah ordered the exhumation of Nader Shah's corpse, and had it sent to Tehran, where it was reburied alongside Karim Khan Zand's corpse. He then forced Shahrokh to give him any riches that originally belonged to Nader Shah. Shahrokh swore that he did not possess any more of Nader Shah's riches. Agha Mohammad Shah, ruthless and revengeful, and with a desire for treasure, did not believe him. He had Shahrokh Shah hurt severely to confess the hidden locations of the last gems that had passed down to him from his grandfather. Shahrokh, however, refused to speak. Agha Mohammad Shah was personally involved in the torture and on one occasion he had Shahrokh tied to a chair, his head shaved and a crown of thick paste built on his head. He then poured a jug of molten lead into the crown. A number of Shahrokh's servants, who were struck with misery for their previous monarch, sent an admired mullah of the city to make an emotional appeal to Agha Mohammad Shah in support of Shahrokh and Shahrokh was sent to Mazandaran with his family. Shahrokh died at Damghan due to the injuries he had suffered during his torture.

=== Rest of reign ===
Agha Mohammad Khan restored Iran to a unity it had not had since Karim Khan. He reunited the territory of contemporary Iran and the Caucasus region which had been part of the concept of Iran for centuries. He was, however, a man of extreme violence who killed almost all who could threaten his hold on power, a trait he showed in several of his campaigns. A year after Agha Mohammad Khan re-subjugated the Caucasus, he also captured Khorasan. Shah Rukh, ruler of Khorasan and grandson of Nader Shah, was tortured to death because Agha Mohammad Khan thought that he knew of Nader's legendary treasures.

In 1786, Agha Mohammad Khan moved his capital from Sari in his home province of Mazandaran to Tehran. He was the first Iranian ruler to make Tehran—the successor to the great city of Ray—his capital, although both the Safavids and the Zands had expanded the town and built palaces there. One of the main reasons noted for moving the capital farther south was to remain in close reach of Azerbaijan and Iran's integral Caucasian territories in the North Caucasus and South Caucasus, at that time not yet ceded to Imperial Russia, their fate in the course of the 19th century. He was formally crowned in 1796 and founded the Qajar dynasty.

Although the Russians briefly took and occupied Derbent and Baku during the expedition of 1796 under the command of Count Valerian Zubov, Agha Mohammad Khan successfully expanded Iranian influence into the Caucasus, reasserting Iranian sovereignty over its former dependencies in the region. He was, however, a notoriously cruel ruler, who reduced Tbilisi to ashes, while massacring and carrying away its Christian population, much as he had done with his Muslim subjects. He based his strength on tribal manpower like Genghis Khan, Timur and Nader Shah.

=== Death ===
Agha Mohammad's successful reign was short-lived, as he was assassinated in 1797 in his tent in the city of Shusha, the capital of the Karabakh Khanate, three days after he had taken the city, and less than three years after he had taken power. According to Hasan-e Fasa'i's' Farsnama-ye Naseri, during Agha Mohammad's stay in Shusha, one night a quarrel arose between a Georgian servant named Sadegh Gorji and the valet Khodadad Esfahani. They raised their voices to such a pitch that the shah became angry and ordered both to be executed. Sadeq Khan Shaqaqi, a prominent emir, interceded on their behalf, but was not listened to.

The shah, however, ordered their execution to be postponed until Saturday, as this happened to be the evening of Friday (the Islamic holy day), and ordered them back to their duties in the royal pavilion, unfettered and unchained, awaiting their execution the next day. From experience, however, they knew that the shah would keep to what he had ordered, and, having no hope, they turned to boldness. When the shah was sleeping, they were joined by the valet Abbas Mazandarani, who was in the plot with them, and the three invaded the royal pavilion and with dagger and knife murdered the shah.

His nephew, crowned as Fath-Ali Shah Qajar, succeeded him.

== Personality, appearance, and evaluation ==
Agha Mohammad Khan's castration at the age of six left him permanently damaged, both physically and mentally. His body was sick and weak, although he attempted to hide his frailty. He had epilepsy and fell unconscious for three days in 1790/91 due to a stroke. Due to his small stature, he could be mistaken for a young boy from a far enough distance. This seemingly annoyed him to a great extent, especially if a person kept looking at him. He also had a high-pitched voice and deep facial wrinkles. He was interested in hunting and literature. He would have the Shahnameh read aloud to him while in bed.

Nosratollah Mohtasham portraying the Iranian historical ruler Agha Mohammad Khan Qajar in the 1954 biographical film Agha Mohammad Khan Qajar

Agha Mohammad Khan is remembered for his cruelty and vindictiveness. The violence he suffered as a child, the violent deaths of his father and grandfather in the struggle for power, and the violence that characterized 18th-century Iran have been cited as possible explanations for his behavior. Gavin Hambly writes that before the killing of his loyal brother Jafar Qoli there was "little in Āghā Muḥammad Khān's career to suggest that he was more ferocious or brutal than his contemporaries" and suggests that the incident "may have determined Āghā Muḥammad Khān's later attitudes to those around him." After the murder of Jafar Qoli and the blinding of another brother, Mostafa Qoli, Agha Mohammad reportedly said, "I have shed all this blood, that the boy Baba Khan [future Fath Ali Shah] may reign in peace." According to John R. Perry, his acts of cruelty "can usually be interpreted as politic or exemplary, to terrorize the disaffected (as at Kermān), or to ensure unquestioning obedience". However, he was often "gratuitously vindictive", and his acts of violence were sometimes irrational. For example, on one occasion he became drunk and shot his secretary for no reason, and on another occasion he ordered the castration of one of Lotf Ali Khan's sons immediately after seeing a coin struck in the latter's name.

Agha Mohammad Khan has also been described as a resolute, energetic, ambitious and intelligent ruler. Perry writes that he "usually directed even his least praiseworthy qualities towards the achievement of his aims"; unlike some of his near-contemporaries like Zaki Khan Zand or Nader Shah, he was "able to harness—and where necessary subordinate—his passions to long-term dynastic interests. This is evident in his conciliation of his Yūḵārībāš enemies, his careful provision for the succession, and his concern for administrative detail." According to Maziar Behrooz, he was not an especially outstanding military leader like Nader Shah or Timur, but his "ability to combine the use of force alongside diplomacy and co-optation" is evidence of his leadership. He is credited with finally uniting Iran, in its modern borders, under a single ruler, allowing it to survive the turmoil of the 19th and early 20th centuries.

== Government ==
=== The bureaucracy ===
The bureaucracy remained small during the reign of Agha Mohammad Shah—apart from the grand vizier, the leading figures of the administration were the chief revenue officer (mustaufī) and the muster-master (lashkarnevīs) of the army. Only one person occupied each post during Agha Mohammad Shah's reign; Hajji Ebrahim, who served as grand vizier; Mirza Ismail, who served as the chief revenue officer, and Mirza Asad-Allah Nuri, who served as muster-master. Since Agha Mohammad Shah was primarily busy with his military expeditions, his court was constantly his camp, and Hajji Ebrahim, along with other officials, usually participated in his campaigns.

=== Provincial administration ===
Flag of Iran during the reign of Agha Mohammad Shah.

During Agha Mohammad Shah's reign, provincial administration followed the same model of the Safavid one; beglerbegis were appointed to govern provinces. A city was under the rule of a kalantar and darugha, while its quarters was under the rule of the kadkhuda. Governorship of provinces went for the most part to tribal chieftains—this was later changed by Fath-Ali Shah Qajar, who appointed many of his relatives as governors.

=== Military ===
Agha Mohammad Shah was more of a military leader than politician, and was known for his determined sovereignty, instead of a charismatic one. His military prowess was highly noticeable—Malcolm's evaluation, which was written some years after his death, says the following: "His army was inured to fatigue, and regularly paid; he had introduced excellent arrangement into all its Departments, and his known severity occasioned the utmost alacrity and promptness in the execution of orders, and had he lived a few more years, it is difficult to conjecture the progress of his arms."

The Scottish traveller James Baillie Fraser also says the following thing about him: "Agha Mohammad had likewise the talent of forming good and brave troops. His active and ambitious disposition kept his army constantly engaged; and they acquired a veteran hardihood and expertness, that rendered them superior to any other Asiatic troops."

=== Construction ===
Agha Mohammad Shah did not construct or repair much during his reign, due to the campaigns and battles which occupied his time. In Tehran, he ordered the creation of a mosque named the Masjed-e Shah (meaning "the Shah's mosque"), while in Mashhad he ordered the reparation of the Imam Reza shrine. In Astarabad, he repaired (or fortified) the walls, emptied the ditch, built several buildings, one of them being a palace for the governor. Furthermore, he also improved the overall condition of the city. He did something similar in Babol, Ashraf, and Sari. Of all these constructions and reparations, his best and most lasting achievement is debatably making Tehran his capital, which to this day is the country's capital and largest city.

== Family ==
Agha Mohammad had three wives:

- Golbakht Khanom, a Turkoman from Yamut; married Fath-Ali Shah Qajar afterwards
- Maryam Khanom, a Jew from Mazandaran; married Fath-Ali Shah Qajar after his death
- Asiya Khanom, daughter of Mohammad Khan Ezzeddinlu Qajar, former wife of Hossein Qoli Khan Qajar, and mother of Fath-Ali Shah Qajar

== Sources ==
- Axworthy, Michael (6 November 2008). Iran: Empire of the Mind: A History from Zoroaster to the Present Day. Penguin UK. ISBN 978-0141903415.
- Amanat, Abbas (1997a). "Ebrāhīm Kalāntar Šīrāzī". Encyclopædia Iranica, Vol. III, Fasc. 1. pp. 66–71.
- Bournoutian, George (2016). "Prelude to War: The Russian Siege and Storming of the Fortress of Ganjeh, 1803–4". Iranian Studies. 50 (1). Taylor & Francis: 107–124. doi:10.1080/00210862.2016.1159779. S2CID 163302882.
- Fisher, William Bayne (1991). The Cambridge History of Iran. Vol. 7. Cambridge University Press. pp. 128–129. "Agha Muhammad Khan remained nine days in the vicinity of Tiflis. His victory proclaimed the restoration of Iranian military power in the region formerly under Safavid domination."
- Bakhash, S. (1983). "Administration in Iran vi. Safavid, Zand, and Qajar periods". Encyclopædia Iranica, Vol. I, Fasc. 5. pp. 462–466.
- Behrooz, Maziar (2023). Iran at War: Interactions with the Modern World and the Struggle with Imperial Russia. I.B. Tauris. ISBN 978-0755637379.
- Bournoutian, George (2021). From the Kur to the Aras: A Military History of Russia's Move into the South Caucasus and the First Russo-Iranian War, 1801–1813. Brill. ISBN 978-9004445154.
- Perry, J. R. (1984). "Āgā Mohammad Khan Qājār". Encyclopædia Iranica, Vol. I, Fasc. 6. pp. 602–605.
- Ghani, Cyrus (2001). Iran and the Rise of the Reza Shah: From Qajar Collapse to Pahlavi Power. I.B. Tauris. pp. 1–434. ISBN 9781860646294. Archived from the original on 9 February 2018.
- Daryaee, Touraj (2012). The Oxford Handbook of Iranian History. Oxford University Press. pp. 1–432. ISBN 978-0199875757. Archived from the original on 1 January 2019.
- Hambly, Gavin R.G (1991). "Agha Muhammad Khan and the establishment of the Qajar dynasty". The Cambridge History of Iran, Vol. 7: From Nadir Shah to the Islamic Republic. Cambridge: Cambridge University Press. pp. 104–144. ISBN 9780521200950.
- Bosworth, Clifford Edmund (2007). Historic Cities of the Islamic World. Brill. pp. 1–615. ISBN 9789004153882. Archived from the original on 16 March 2017.
- Amanat, Abbas (1997b). Pivot of the Universe: Nasir Al-Din Shah Qajar and the Iranian Monarchy, 1831–1896. University of California Press. pp. 1–536. ISBN 9780520083219. Archived from the original on 19 April 2017.
- Perry, John R. (2011). "Karim Khan Zand". Encyclopædia Iranica, Vol. XV, Fasc. 6. pp. 561–564.
- Suny, Ronald Grigor (1994). The Making of the Georgian Nation. Indiana University Press. p. 55. ISBN 0253209153.
- Mikaberidze, Alexander (2011). Conflict and Conquest in the Islamic World: A Historical Encyclopedia. Vol. 1. ABC-CLIO. ISBN 978-1598843361.
- Negahban, Farzin (2008). "Āghā Muḥammad Khān Qājār". In Madelung, Wilferd; Daftary, Farhad (eds.). Encyclopaedia Islamica Online. Brill Online. ISSN 1875-9831.
- Tapper, Richard (1997). Frontier Nomads of Iran: A Political and Social History of the Shahsevan. Cambridge University Press. ISBN 978-0-52158-336-7.

Agha Mohammad Khan Qajar Qajar dynasty Born: 14 March 1742 Died: 17 June 1797
Iranian royalty
Preceded by Lotf Ali Khan Zand	Shah of Iran; 1789–1797	Succeeded by Fath-Ali Shah Qajar
