= Faraghi Rural District =

Rural district in Golestan province, Iran

Faraghi Rural District Persian: دهستان فراغی
- Rural District
- Location within Iran
- Coordinates: 36°56′N 54°16′E
- Country: Iran
- Province: Golestan
- County: Torkaman
- District: Central
- Established: 2009
- Capital: Khvajehlar

Population (2016)
  - Total: 5,656
- Time zone: UTC+3:30 (IRST)

Faraghi Rural District (Persian: دهستان فراغی) is in the Central District of Torkaman County, Golestan province, Iran. Its capital is the village of Khvajehlar.

== History ==
Faraghi Rural District was created in the Central District in 2009.

== Demographics ==
=== Population ===
At the time of the 2011 census, the rural district's population was 5,238 in 1,298 households. The 2016 census measured the population of the rural district as 5,656 in 1,423 households. The most populous of its seven villages was Khvajehlar, with 2,193 people.

=== Other villages in the rural district ===
- Aq Sin Tappeh
- Arkh-e Kuchek
- Eslam Tappeh
- Gamishli Nazar
- Khambarabad
- Mohammadabad-e Shomali
