= Mohammad Sadiq (painter) =

18th century Iranian painter

- Occupation: Painter
- Years active: 1740s – 1790s

Mohammad Sadiq (Persian: محمدصادق) was a noted artist from 18th century Iran. He was a painter at the court of the Zand ruler Karim Khan (r. 1750–79). After Karim Khan's death, he worked for the Qajar ruler Agha Mohammad Khan Qajar (r. 1789–97).

== Portrait of Rostam Khan ==
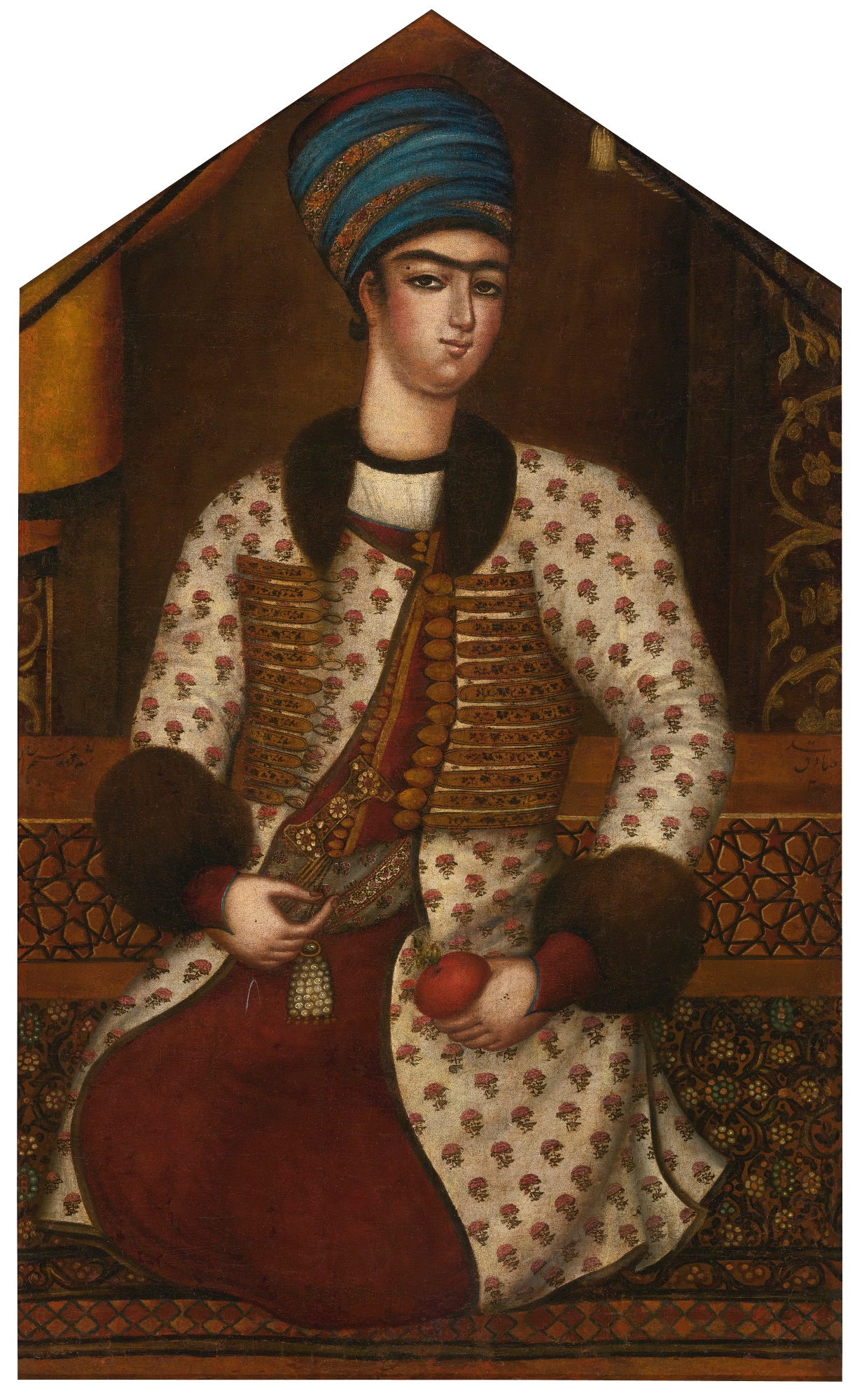
Portrait of Rostam Khan painted by Mohammad Sadiq, circa 1779

One of Sadiq's famous paintings is a portrait of Mohammad Rostam Khan Zand, a Zand prince and grandson of the military commander Zaki Khan. The painting is often praised for its classical Persian depiction of Male Masculinity.

== Gallery ==
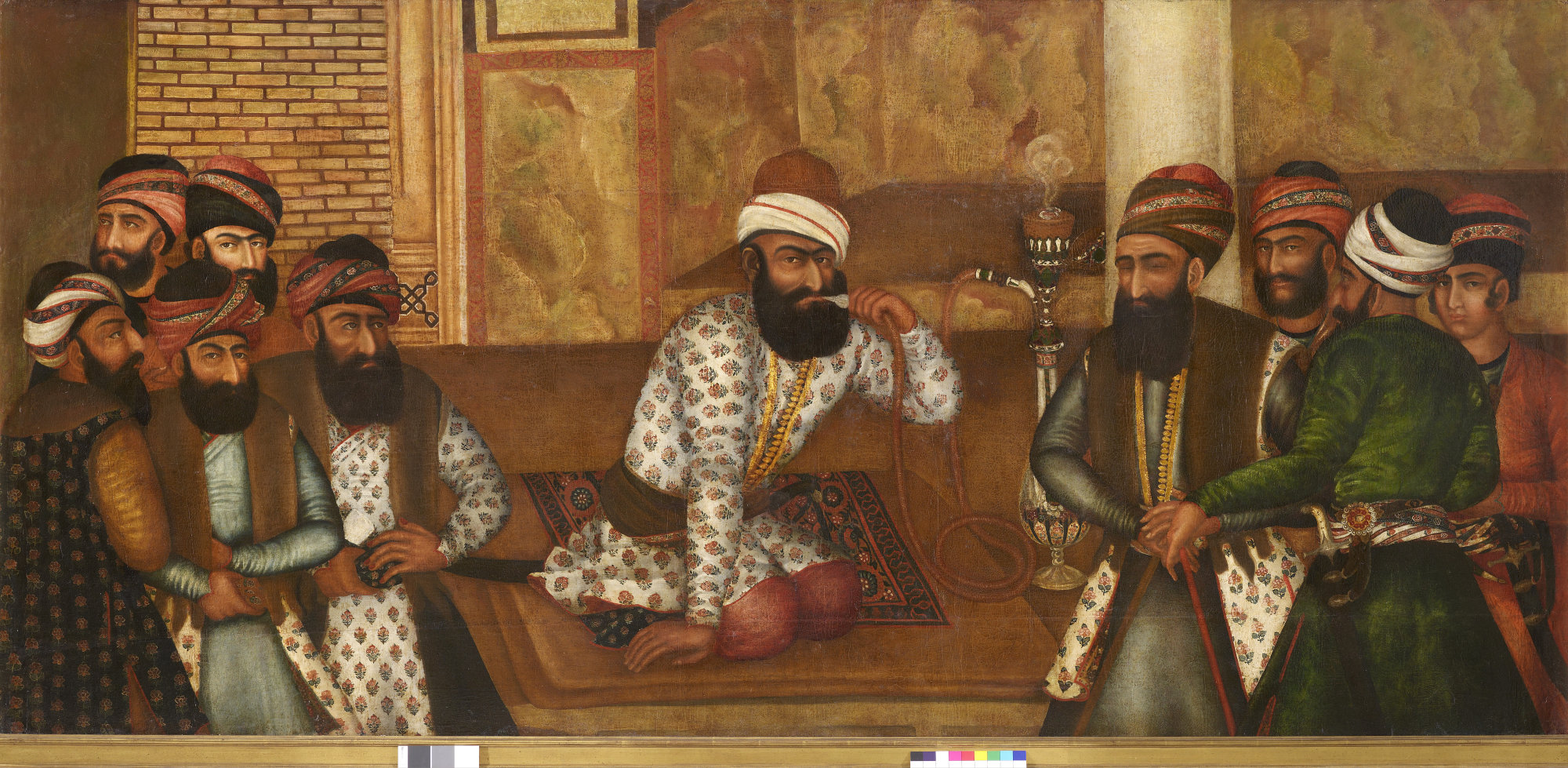
The royal court of Karim Khan painted by Mohammad Sadiq

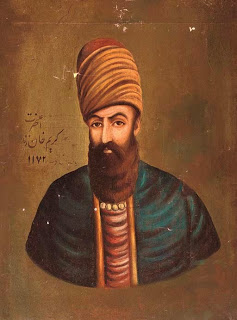
Portrait of Karim Khan, 1758

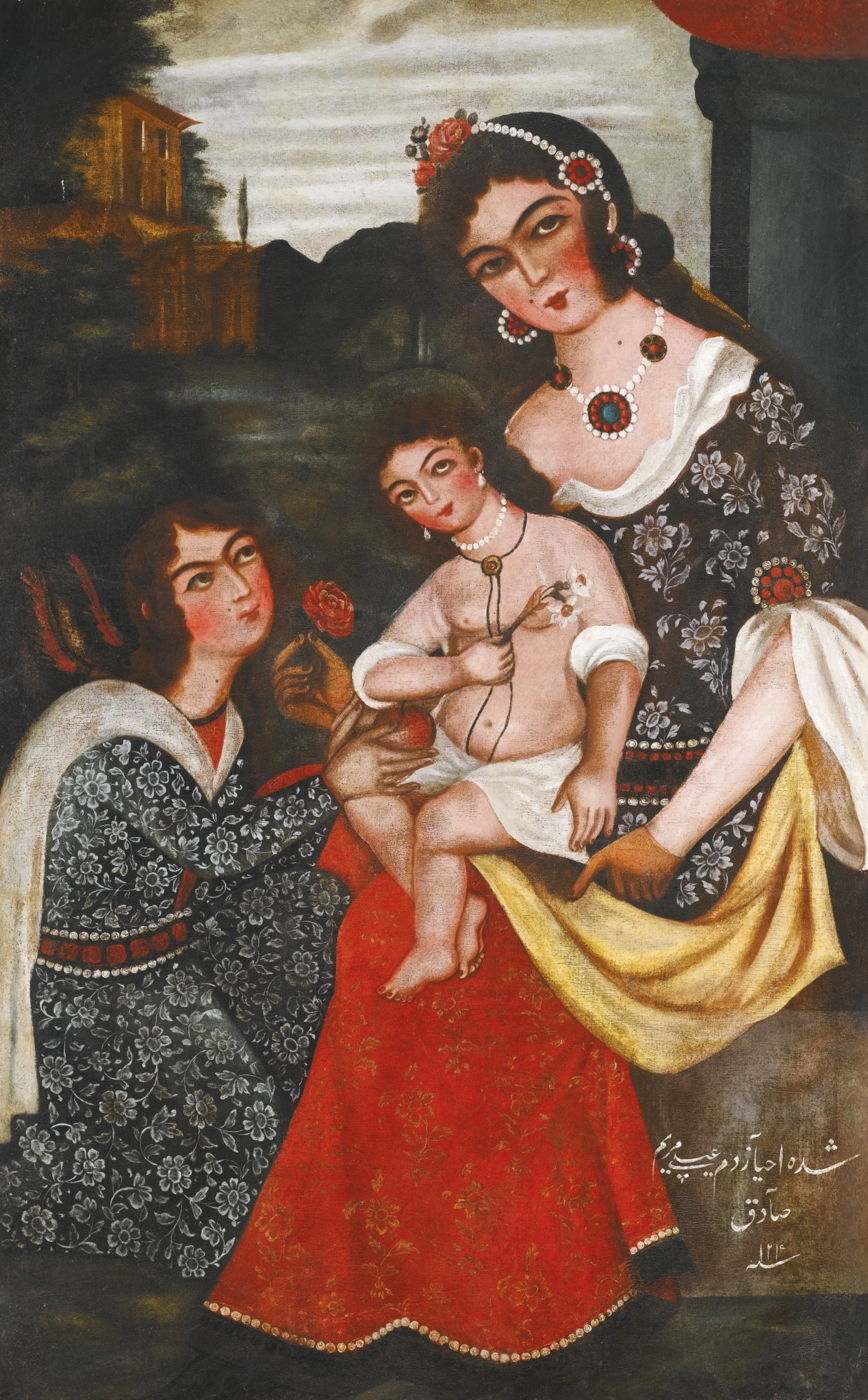
Madonna and Child with Angel, probably 1204 AH 1789/90 CE

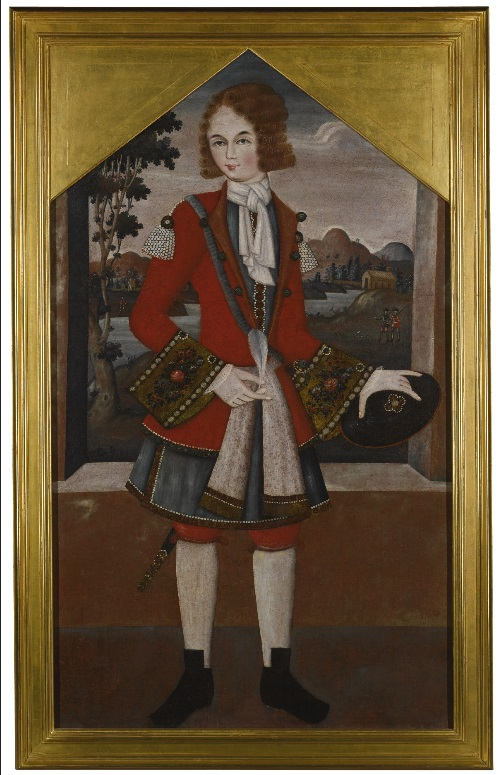
A European gentleman

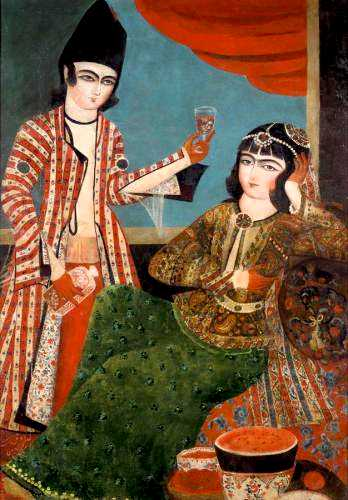
Painting of a Persian couple, 1787

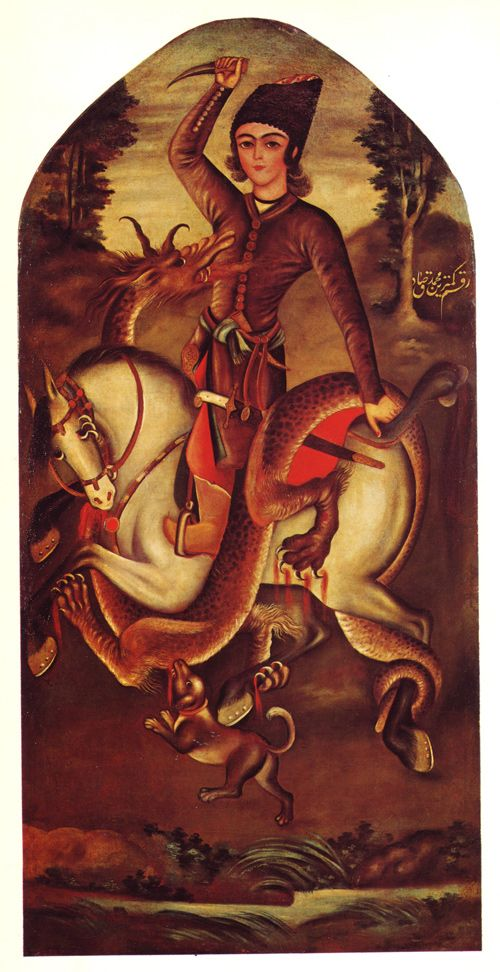
Painting of a Qajar prince fighting a dragon

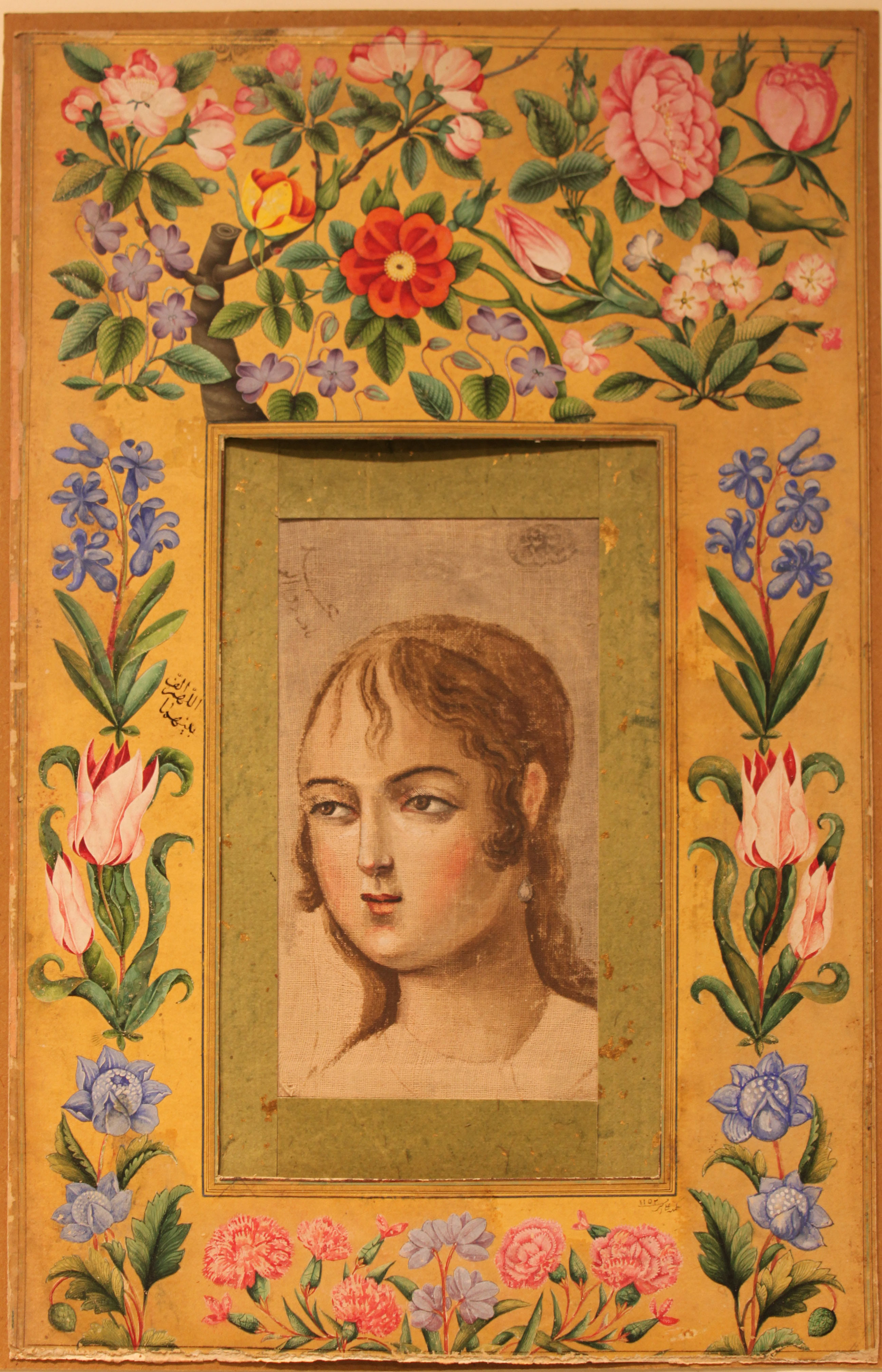
Painting of a Young Beauty by Mohammad Sadiq. Borders signed by 'Ali Akbar, A.H. 1152/A.D. 1739. Met Museum

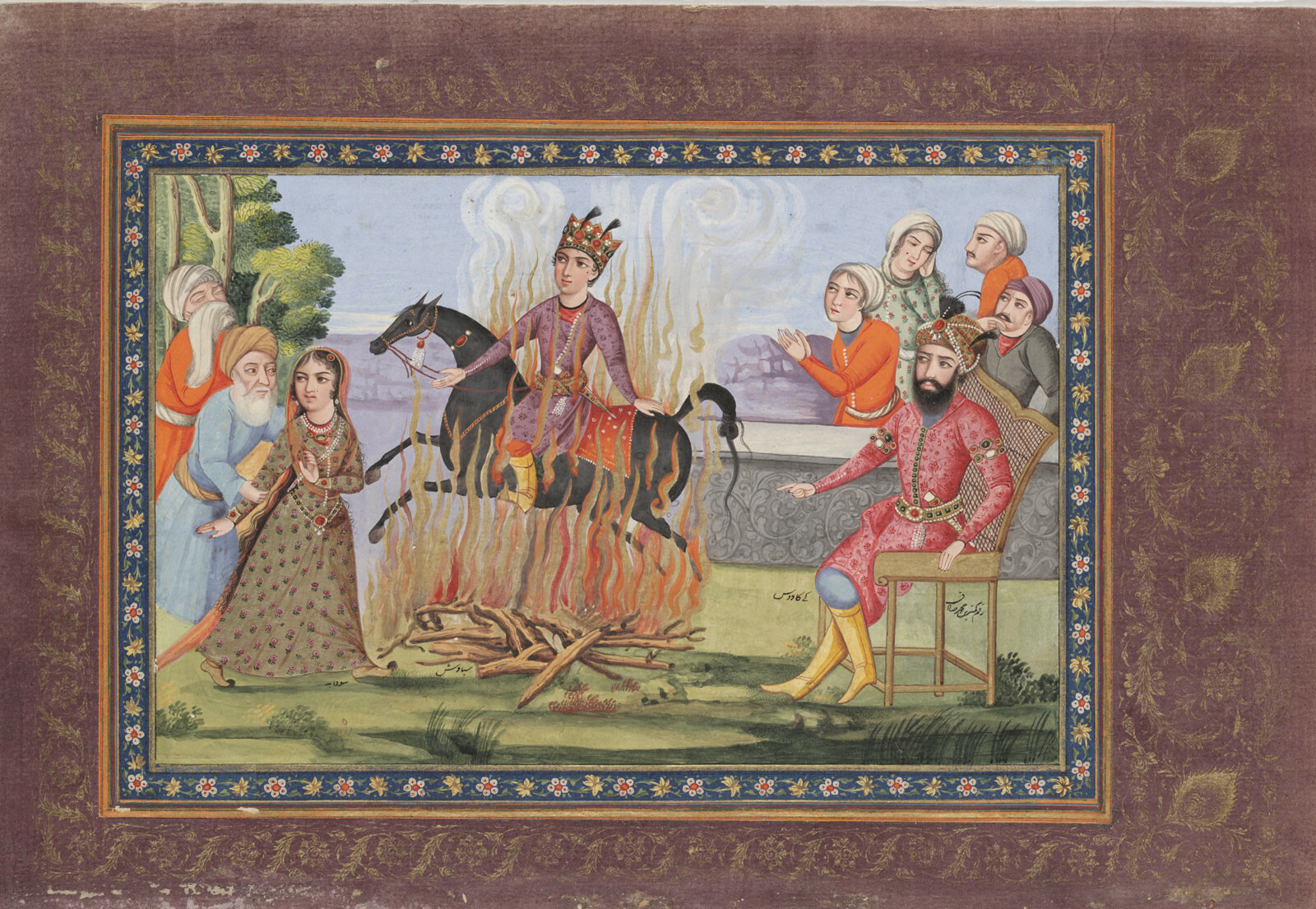
The fire ordeal of Siyâvash. McGill University Library Ms. Persian 39

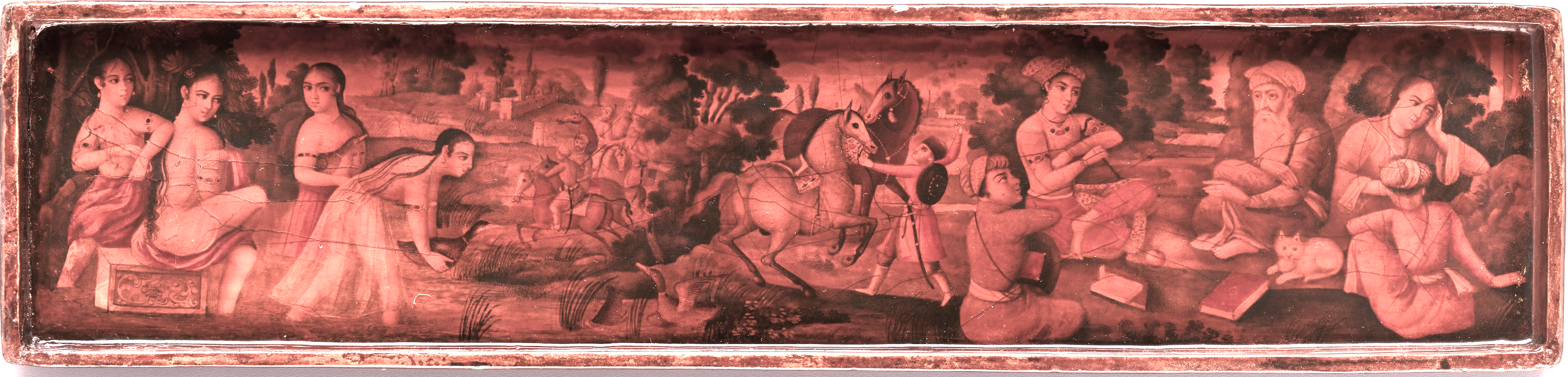
Lacquer pen box (color changed for clarity), probably 1793/94
