= Yamut =

Village in Golestan province, Iran

Yamut Persian: يموت
- Village
- Location within Iran
- Coordinates: 36°52′16″N 54°03′37″E
- Country: Iran
- Province: Golestan
- County: Torkaman
- District: Central
- Rural District: Jafarbay-ye Jonubi

Population (2016)
  - Total: 146
- Time zone: UTC+3:30 (IRST)

Yamut (Persian: يموت) (Note: Also romanized as Yamūt) is a village in Jafarbay-ye Jonubi Rural District of the Central District of Torkaman County, Golestan province, Iran.

== Demographics ==
=== Population ===
At the time of the 2006 National Census, the village's population was 88 in 21 households. The following census in 2011 counted 113 people in 32 households. The 2016 census measured the population of the village as 146 people in 40 households.
