= Jeeran Khanum =

Mother of Hossein Qoli Khan Qajar and Agha Mohammad Khan Qajar

Jeeran Khanum (Persian: جیران خانم), also spelled Jeyran Khanom, was the wife of Mohammad Hassan Khan Qajar of the Ashaqa-Bash tribe, the mother of Hossein Qoli Khan Qajar and Agha Mohammad Khan Qajar (the founder of the Qajar dynasty), and the daughter of Eskandar Khan Qavanlou.

She has been described as a brave, capable, wise, and politically astute woman. Until her death, she managed the Ashaqa-Bash tribe and held this position during the time when Mohammad Hassan Khan was engaged in battles in various cities. Her origins were of Turkic descent, and her name reflects this heritage. Agha Mohammad Khan learned archery, horseback riding, reading and writing, and memorizing the Quran from his mother during his childhood.
