= Si Joval District =

District in Golestan province, Iran

Si Joval District Persian: بخش سیجوال
- District
- Location within Iran
- Coordinates: 36°52′N 54°09′E
- Country: Iran
- Province: Golestan
- County: Torkaman
- Established: 2009
- Capital: Si Joval

Population (2016)
  - Total: 13,458
- Time zone: UTC+3:30 (IRST)

Si Joval District (Persian: بخش سیجوال) is in Torkaman County, Golestan province, Iran. Its capital is the city of Si Joval.

== History ==
In 2009, villages were separated from the Central District in the formation of Si Joval District. The village of Si Joval was converted to a city in 2020.

== Demographics ==
=== Population ===
At the time of the 2011 census, the district's population was 12,433 in 3,042 households. The 2016 census measured the population of the district as 13,458 inhabitants in 3,559 households.

=== Administrative divisions ===
Si Joval District Population
Administrative Divisions	2011	2016
Qarah Su-ye Gharbi RD	7,266	7,816
Qarah Su-ye Sharqi RD	5,167	5,642
Si Joval (city) (Note: Became a city after the 2016 census)		
Total	12,433	13,458
RD = Rural District
