= Jafarbay-ye Jonubi Rural District =

Rural district in Golestan province, Iran

Jafarbay-ye Jonubi Rural District Persian: دهستان جعفربای جنوبی
- Rural District
- Location within Iran
- Coordinates: 36°56′N 54°08′E
- Country: Iran
- Province: Golestan
- County: Torkaman
- District: Central
- Established: 1986
- Capital: Panj Peykar

Population (2016)
  - Total: 6,894
- Time zone: UTC+3:30 (IRST)

Jafarbay-ye Jonubi Rural District (Persian: دهستان جعفربای جنوبی) is in the Central District of Torkaman County, Golestan province, Iran. Its capital is the village of Panj Peykar. The previous capital of the rural district was the village of Si Joval, now a city.

== Demographics ==
=== Population ===
At the time of the 2006 National Census, the rural district's population was 18,448 in 3,712 households. There were 6,396 inhabitants in 1,534 households at the following census of 2011. The 2016 census measured the population of the rural district as 6,894 in 1,821 households. The most populous of its eight villages was Chapaqli, with 3,064 people.

=== Other villages in the rural district ===
- Eskeleh
- Hashemanli
- Seydabad
- Urkat Hajji
- Yamut
