= Torkaman County =

County in Golestan province, Iran

Torkaman County Persian: شهرستان ترکمن
- County
- Location of Torkaman County in Golestan province (left, pink)

- Location of Golestan province in Iran
- Coordinates: 36°55′N 54°10′E
- Country: Iran
- Province: Golestan
- Established: 1980
- Capital: Bandar Torkaman
- Districts: Central, Si Joval

Population (2016)
  - Total: 79,978
- Time zone: UTC+3:30 (IRST)

Torkaman County (Persian: شهرستان ترکمن) (Note: Formerly Bandar Torkaman County (شهرستان بندر ترکمن)) is in Golestan province, Iran. Its capital is the city of Bandar Torkaman. (Note: Formerly Bandar Shah)

== History ==
Torkaman County separated from Mazandaran province in 1997 during the establishment of Golestan province.

In 2009, Faraghi Rural District was created in the Central District, and villages were separated from Jafarbay-ye Jonubi Rural District in the formation of Si Joval District, which was divided into the new Qarah Su-ye Gharbi and Qarah Su-ye Sharqi Rural Districts. At the same time, Gomishan District was separated from the county in the establishment of Gomishan County. The village of Si Joval was converted to a city in 2020.

== Demographics ==
=== Population ===
At the time of the 2006 census, the county's population was 122,218 in 25,295 households. The following census in 2011 counted 72,803 people in 17,772 households. The 2016 census measured the population of the county as 79,978 in 21,315 households.

=== Administrative divisions ===
Torkaman County's population history and administrative structure over three consecutive censuses are shown in the following table.

Torkaman County Population
Administrative Divisions	2006	2011	2016
Central District	63,493	60,370	66,520
Faraghi RD		5,238	5,656
Jafarbay-ye Jonubi RD	18,448	6,396	6,894
Bandar Torkaman (city)	45,045	48,736	53,970
Gomishan District (Note: Transferred to Gomishan County)	58,725		
Jafarbay-ye Gharbi RD	13,650		
Jafarbay-ye Sharqi RD	15,891		
Gomish Tappeh (city)	15,639		
Siminshahr (city) (Note: Merger of three villages)	13,545		
Si Joval District		12,433	13,458
Qarah Su-ye Gharbi RD		7,266	7,816
Qarah Su-ye Sharqi RD		5,167	5,642
Si Joval (city) (Note: Became a city after the 2016 census)			
Total	122,218	72,803	79,978
RD = Rural District

== See also ==
Media related to Torkaman County at Wikimedia Commons
