= Central District (Torkaman County) =

District in Golestan province, Iran

Central District (Torkaman County) Persian: بخش مرکزی شهرستان ترکمن
- District
- Location within Iran
- Coordinates: 36°56′N 54°12′E
- Country: Iran
- Province: Golestan
- County: Torkaman
- Established: 1980
- Capital: Bandar Torkaman

Population (2016)
  - Total: 66,520
- Time zone: UTC+3:30 (IRST)

The Central District of Torkaman County (Persian: بخش مرکزی شهرستان ترکمن) is in Golestan province, Iran. Its capital is the city of Bandar Torkaman. (Note: Formerly Bandar Shah)

== History ==
In 2009, Faraghi Rural District was created in the district, and villages were separated from Jafarbay-ye Jonubi Rural District in the formation of Si Joval District.

== Demographics ==
=== Population ===
At the time of the 2006 census, the district's population was 63,493 in 13,467 households. The following census in 2011 counted 60,370 people in 14,701 households. The 2016 census measured the population of the district as 66,520 inhabitants in 17,756 households.

=== Administrative divisions ===
Central District (Torkaman County) Population
Administrative Divisions	2006	2011	2016
Faraghi RD		5,238	5,656
Jafarbay-ye Jonubi RD	18,448	6,396	6,894
Bandar Torkaman (city)	45,045	48,736	53,970
Total	63,493	60,370	66,520
RD = Rural District
