= Qezeljeh =

Qezeljeh or Qezeljah or Qezelejeh or Qezelejah (Persian: قزلجه), also rendered as Qiziljah or Qiziljeh or Qizilja, may refer to:

== East Azerbaijan Province ==
- Qezeljeh, Bostanabad, East Azerbaijan Province
- Qezelejah Meydan, Bostanabad County, East Azerbaijan Province
- Qezeljeh-ye Arshad, Charuymaq County, East Azerbaijan Province
- Qezeljeh-ye Qeshlaq, Charuymaq County, East Azerbaijan Province
- Qezeljeh-ye Qomeshlu, Charuymaq County, East Azerbaijan Province
- Qezeljeh, Heris, East Azerbaijan Province
- Qezeljeh, Meyaneh, East Azerbaijan Province
- Qezeljeh-ye Akrad, Sarab County, East Azerbaijan Province
- Qezeljeh-ye Sadat, Sarab County, East Azerbaijan Province
- Qezeljeh, Shabestar, East Azerbaijan Province

== Hamadan Province ==
- Qezeljeh, Hajjilu, Hamadan Province
- Qezeljeh, Kuhin, Hamadan Province
- Qezeljeh, Razan, Hamadan Province

== Kurdistan Province ==
- Qezeljeh, Kurdistan, a village in Bijar County
- Qezeljeh Kand, a village in Qorveh County

== Markazi Province ==
- Qezeljeh, Markazi
- Qezeljeh, Arak, Markazi Province

== West Azerbaijan Province ==
- Qezeljeh, Khoy, West Azerbaijan Province
- Qezeljeh, Dizaj, Khoy County, West Azerbaijan province
- Qezeljah, Salmas, West Azerbaijan Province
- Qezeljeh Gol, West Azerbaijan Province
- Qezeljeh Qaleh, West Azerbaijan Province
- Qezeljeh-ye Sofla, West Azerbaijan
- Qezeljeh, Abhar, Zanjan Province
- Qezeljeh, Ijrud, Zanjan Province

== Zanjan Province ==
- Qezeljeh, Mahneshan, Zanjan Province
- Qezeljeh-ye Aq Emam, Golestan Province
- Qezeljeh-ye Pashmak, Golestan Province
- Qezeljeh-ye Olya, Zanjan Province
- Qezeljeh-ye Sofla, Zanjan

== See also ==
- Qezelcheh (disambiguation)
