= Shirvan Shahlu =

Shirvan Shahlu شيروان شاهلو
- Village
- Location within Iran
- Coordinates: 37°12′43″N 46°14′34″E
- Country: Iran
- Province: East Azerbaijan
- County: Malekan
- Bakhsh: Central
- Rural District: Gavdul-e Sharqi

Population (2006)
  - Total: 137
- Time zone: UTC+3:30 (IRST)
  - Summer (DST): UTC+4:30 (IRDT)

Shirvan Shahlu (Persian: شيروان شاهلو, also Romanized as Shīrvān Shāhlū; also known as Shīravān Shāmnū) is a village in Gavdul-e Sharqi Rural District, in the Central District of Malekan County, East Azerbaijan Province, Iran. At the 2006 census, its population was 137, in 35 families.

== See also ==
- Ban Shirvan
- Bi Bi Shirvan
- Karkhaneh-ye Qand-e Shirvan
- Now Shirvan Kola
- Shirvan County
- Shirvan, Iran
- Shirvan, Lorestan
- Shirvan Mahalleh
- Shirvan Rural District
- Shirvan District
