= Igder =

Igder (Persian: ايگدر) may refer to:

- Igder-e Olya
- Igder-e Sofla
- Shahrak-e Igder
