= Chay Qushan =

Chay Qushan (Persian: چاي قوشان) may refer to:

- Chay Qushan, Ardabil
- Chay Qushan-e Bozorg, Golestan Province
- Chay Qushan-e Kuchek, Golestan Province
