= Qalandarabad (disambiguation) =

Qalandarabad is a city in Razavi Khorasan Province, Iran.

Qalandarabad (Persian: قلندراباد) may also refer to:

== Iran ==
- Qalandarabad-e Bala, Golestan Province
- Qalandarabad-e Pain, Golestan Province
- Qalandarabad, Rashtkhvar, Razavi Khorasan Province
- Qalandarabad District, in Razavi Khorasan Province
- Qalandarabad Rural District, in Razavi Khorasan Province

== Pakistan ==
- Qalandarabad, Pakistan
