= Dashli =

Dashli (Persian: داشلي) may refer to several places in Iran:

- Dashli, East Azerbaijan
- Dashli-ye Olya - in the Golestan Province
- Dashli-ye Sofla - in the Golestan Province
- Dashli Qaleh - in the North Khorasan Province

== Other places ==
- Dashli, Afghanistan - place in the Jowzjan Province, Afghanistan
- Dashli ada - island with a mud volcano off the coast of Azerbaijan
