= Qashmar Chenqa =

Mountain in Shirvan, Iran

Coordinates: 37.5268°N 58.1917°E

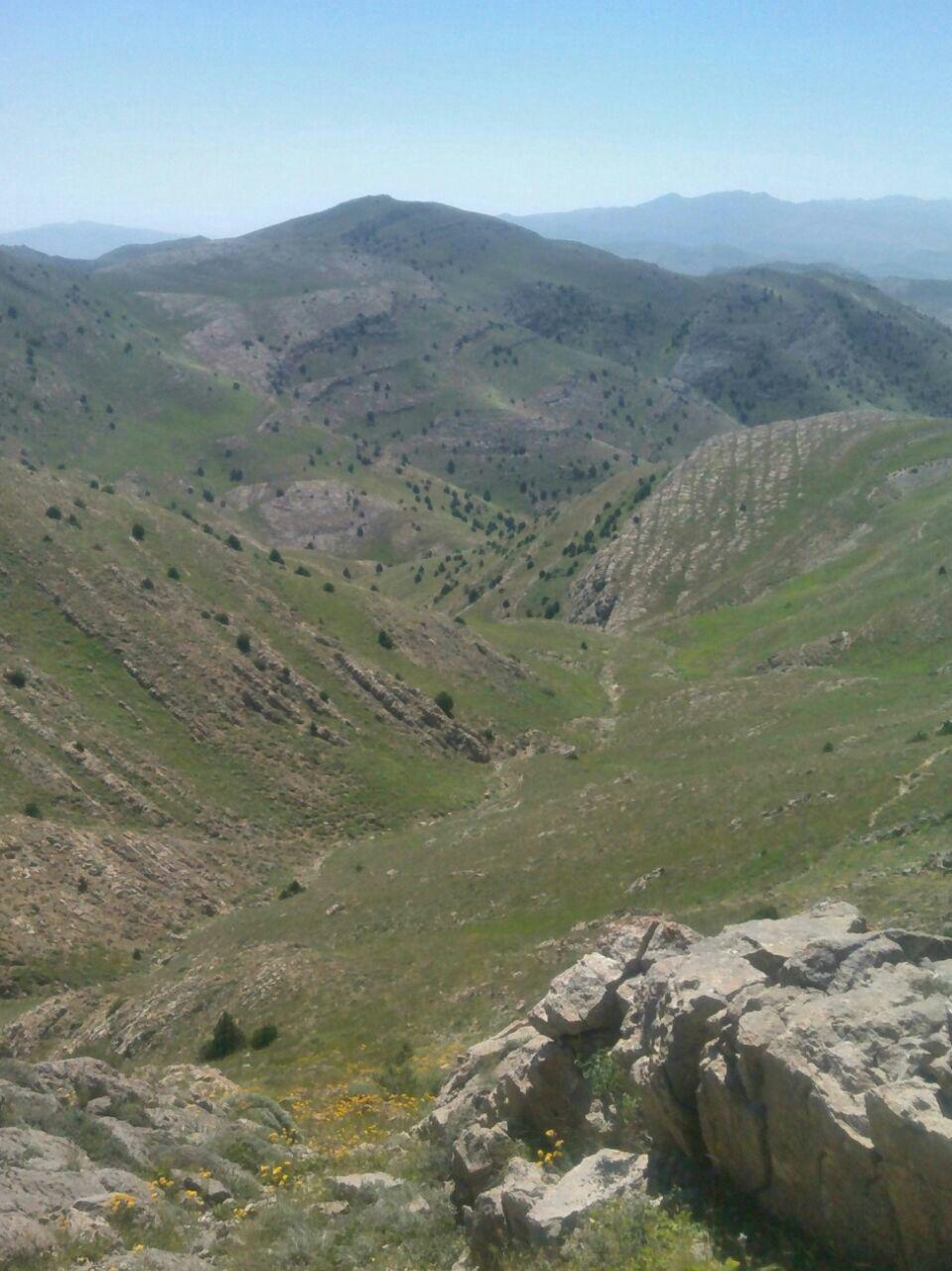

Qashmar is one of the mountains located in the Sivkanlu Rural District, Shirvan County, also is known as Qashmar Chenqa or Qashmar Chinqe. The mountain is located near the village of Alashlu. This mountain range tribe countryside location is Sivkanlu Rural District.
