= Sarli =

Sarli may refer to:

- Sarli dialect, a dialect of Gorani language in Iraq
- Sarli-ye Olya, a village in Golestan Province, Iran
- Sarli-ye Sofla, a village in Golestan Province, Iran
- Isabel Sarli (1935-2019), Argentine actress
- Carlos di Sarli (1903-1960), Argentine musician
- Fausto Sarli (1927-2010), Italian fashion designer
