= Qezelcheh =

Qezelcheh (Persian: قزلچه) may refer to:

- Qezelcheh-ye Pashmak
- Qezelcheh-ye Aq Emam
- Qezelcheh Gol, West Azerbaijan Province

== See also ==
- Qezeljeh (disambiguation)
