= Kismar =

Coordinates: 37.5268°N 58.1917°E

Kismar mountain is one of the city of Shirvan's mountains located in the Sivkanlu district.
