= Guzoni =

Guzoni may refer to:

- Guzoni Tappeh, a village in Aqabad Rural District, Iran
- Guzoni Tappeh-ye Bala, a village in Aqabad Rural District, in the Central District of Gonbad-e Qabus County, Golestan Province, Iran

== See also ==
- Guzzoni
