= Owghaz =

Owghaz (Persian: اوغاز) may refer to:

- Owghaz Kohneh
- Owghaz Tazeh
