= Kochek Oloom =

Kochek Oloom کوچک الوم
- village
- Location within Iran
- Coordinates: 37°12′43″N 55°12′43″E
- Country: Iran
- Province: Golestan
- County: Gonbad-e Qabus
- Bakhsh: Central
- Rural District: Fajr

Population (2016)
  - Total: 1,381
- Time zone: UTC+3:30 (IRST)
  - Summer (DST): UTC+4:30 (IRDT)

Kochek Oloom (Persian: کوچک الوم, also Romanized as Kochāk 'Oloom and Kochek 'Oloom) is a village in Fajr Rural District, in the Central District of Gonbad-e Qabus County, Golestan province, Iran. At the 2016 census, its population was 1,381, in 330 families.
