= Mohammad-Reza Hossein-Nejad =

Iranian politician (born 1965)

Governor-general of North Khorasan
- In office 1 December 2021 – 27 October 2024
- President: Ebrahim Raisi
- Preceded by: Mohammad Ali Shojaee
- Succeeded by: Bahman Nouri

Member of the Parliament of Iran
- In office 27 May 2008 – 26 May 2012
- Preceded by: Hossein Afarideh
- Succeeded by: Abdolreza Azizi
- Constituency: Shirvan

Personal details
- Born: 21 March 1965 (age 61) Shirvan, Iran
- Party: Principlist
- Education: Ferdowsi University

Mohammad-Reza Hossein-Nejad (Persian: محمدرضا حسین‌نژاد, born 21 March 1965) is an Iranian conservative politician who formerly served as the Governor general of North Khorasan Province from 2021 to 2024. Hossein-Nejad was a member of the Parliament of Iran from 2008 to 2012, representing Shirvan.

== Education ==
Mohammad-Reza Hossein-Nejad holds a bachelor's degree in civil engineering from Ferdowsi University of Mashhad.
