= Hivehchi =

Hivehchi (Persian: هيوه چي) may refer to:

- Hivehchi-ye Bala
- Hivehchi-ye Markazi
