= Abadan Tappeh =

Village in Golestan province, Iran

Abadan Tappeh Persian: آبادان تپه
- Village
- Location within Iran
- Coordinates: 37°24′37″N 55°15′06″E
- Country: Iran
- Province: Golestan
- County: Gonbad-e Kavus
- District: Central
- Rural District: Aqabad

Population (2016)
  - Total: 2,675
- Time zone: UTC+3:30 (IRST)

Abadan Tappeh (Persian: آبادان تپه) (Note: Also romanized as Ābādān Tappeh) is a village in Aqabad Rural District of the Central District in Gonbad-e Kavus County, Golestan province, Iran.

== Demographics ==
=== Population ===
At the time of the 2006 National Census, the village's population was 2,120 in 365 households. The following census in 2011 counted 2,380 people in 564 households. The 2016 census measured the population of the village as 2,675 people in 694 households.
