= Abbasabad, Gonbad-e Kavus =

Village in Golestan province, Iran

Abbasabad Persian: عباس آباد
- Village
- Location within Iran
- Coordinates: 37°18′25″N 55°17′42″E
- Country: Iran
- Province: Golestan
- County: Gonbad-e Kavus
- District: Central
- Rural District: Fajr

Population (2016)
  - Total: 194
- Time zone: UTC+3:30 (IRST)

Abbasabad (Persian: عباس آباد) (Note: Also romanized as ‘Abbāsābād) is a village in Fajr Rural District of the Central District in Gonbad-e Kavus County, Golestan province, Iran.

== Demographics ==
=== Population ===
At the time of the 2006 National Census, the village's population was 150 in 25 households. The following census in 2011 counted 170 people in 39 households. The 2016 census measured the population of the village as 194 people in 55 households.
