= Araz Mohammad Akhund =

Village in Golestan province, Iran

Araz Mohammad Akhund Persian: ارازمحمداخوند
- Village
- Location within Iran
- Coordinates: 37°11′27″N 55°11′05″E
- Country: Iran
- Province: Golestan
- County: Gonbad-e Kavus
- District: Central
- Rural District: Fajr

Population (2016)
  - Total: 2,712
- Time zone: UTC+3:30 (IRST)

Araz Mohammad Akhund (Persian: ارازمحمداخوند) (Note: Also romanized as Arāz Moḩammad Ākhūnd; also known as Arāz Moḩammad Khān) is a village in Fajr Rural District of the Central District in Gonbad-e Kavus County, Golestan province, Iran.

== Demographics ==
=== Population ===
At the time of the 2006 National Census, the village's population was 1,981 in 461 households. The following census in 2011 counted 2,491 people in 637 households. The 2016 census measured the population of the village as 2,712 people in 734 households.
