= Chapar Quymeh =

Village in Golestan province, Iran

Chapar Quymeh Persian: چپرقويمه
- Village
- Location within Iran
- Coordinates: 37°26′00″N 55°05′33″E
- Country: Iran
- Province: Golestan
- County: Gonbad-e Kavus
- District: Central
- Rural District: Aqabad

Population (2016)
  - Total: 711
- Time zone: UTC+3:30 (IRST)

Chapar Quymeh (Persian: چپرقويمه) (Note: Also romanized as Chapar Qūymeh; also known as Chīr Qūymeh) is a village in Aqabad Rural District of the Central District in Gonbad-e Kavus County, Golestan province, Iran.

== Demographics ==
=== Population ===
At the time of the 2006 National Census, the village's population was 633 in 124 households. The following census in 2011 counted 676 people in 184 households. The 2016 census measured the population of the village as 711 people in 192 households.
