= Seyyed Niyaz =

Village in Golestan province, Iran

Seyyed Niyaz Persian: سيد نياز
- Village
- Location within Iran
- Coordinates: 37°18′47″N 55°09′10″E
- Country: Iran
- Province: Golestan
- County: Gonbad-e Kavus
- District: Central
- Rural District: Aqabad

Population (2016)
  - Total: 260
- Time zone: UTC+3:30 (IRST)

Seyyed Niyaz (Persian: سيد نياز) (Note: Also romanized as Seyyed Nīāz and Seyyed Nīyāz; formerly known as Mazraeh-ye Said Niyazi (مزرعه سعيد نيازي), also romanized as Mazra‘eh-ye Sa‘īd Nīyāzī) is a village in Aqabad Rural District of the Central District in Gonbad-e Kavus County, Golestan province, Iran.

== Demographics ==
=== Population ===
At the time of the 2006 National Census, the village's population, as Mazraeh-ye Said Niyazi, was 253 in 56 households. The following census in 2011 counted 249 people in 61 households, by which time the village was listed as Seyyed Niyaz. The 2016 census measured the population of the village as 260 people in 70 households.
