= Shahrak-e Beheshti =

Village in Golestan province, Iran

Shahrak-e Beheshti Persian: شهرك بهشتي
- Village
- Location within Iran
- Coordinates: 37°09′52″N 54°58′03″E
- Country: Iran
- Province: Golestan
- County: Gonbad-e Kavus
- District: Central
- Rural District: Bagheli-ye Marama

Population (2016)
  - Total: 1,778
- Time zone: UTC+3:30 (IRST)

Shahrak-e Beheshti (Persian: شهرك بهشتي) (Note: Also romanized as Shahrak-e Beheshtī) is a village in Bagheli-ye Marama Rural District of the Central District in Gonbad-e Kavus County, Golestan province, Iran.

== Demographics ==
=== Population ===
At the time of the 2006 National Census, the village's population was 1,737 in 359 households. The following census in 2011 counted 1,909 people in 461 households. The 2016 census measured the population of the village as 1,778 people in 465 households.
