= Ertaq Hajji =

Village in Golestan province, Iran

Ertaq Hajji Persian: ارتق حاجي
- Village
- Location within Iran
- Coordinates: 37°12′19″N 55°11′41″E
- Country: Iran
- Province: Golestan
- County: Gonbad-e Kavus
- District: Central
- Rural District: Fajr

Population (2016)
  - Total: 1,249
- Time zone: UTC+3:30 (IRST)

Ertaq Hajji (Persian: ارتق حاجي) (Note: Also romanized as Ertaq Ḩājjī) is a village in Fajr Rural District of the Central District in Gonbad-e Kavus County, Golestan province, Iran.

== Demographics ==
=== Population ===
At the time of the 2006 National Census, the village's population was 970 in 225 households. The following census in 2011 counted 1,194 people in 334 households. The 2016 census measured the population of the village as 1,249 people in 352 households.
