= Dashli-ye Sofla =

Dashli-ye Sofla داشلي سفلي
- Village
- Location within Iran
- Coordinates: 37°14′00″N 55°05′00″E
- Country: Iran
- Province: Golestan
- County: Gonbad-e Qabus
- Bakhsh: Central
- Rural District: Soltanali

Population (2006)
  - Total: 260
- Time zone: UTC+3:30 (IRST)
  - Summer (DST): UTC+4:30 (IRDT)

Dashli-ye Sofla (Persian: داشلي سفلي, also Romanized as Dāshlī-ye Soflá; also known as Dāshlī-ye Pā’īn) is a village in Soltanali Rural District, in the Central District of Gonbad-e Qabus County, Golestan Province, Iran. At the 2006 census, its population was 260, in 55 families.
