= Aq Cheli-ye Sofla =

Village in Golestan province, Iran

Aq Cheli-ye Sofla Persian: آقچلي سفلي
- Village
- Location within Iran
- Coordinates: 37°11′21″N 55°07′57″E
- Country: Iran
- Province: Golestan
- County: Gonbad-e Kavus
- District: Central
- Rural District: Soltanali

Population (2016)
  - Total: 1,259
- Time zone: UTC+3:30 (IRST)

Aq Cheli-ye Sofla (Persian: آقچلي سفلي) (Note: Also romanized as Aq Chali-ye Sofla, Āq Chalī-ye Soflá, and Āq Chelī-ye Soflá; also known as Āq Chalī) is a village in Soltanali Rural District of the Central District in Gonbad-e Kavus County, Golestan province, Iran.

== Demographics ==
=== Population ===
At the time of the 2006 National Census, the village's population was 930 in 212 households. The following census in 2011 counted 1,185 people in 296 households. The 2016 census measured the population of the village as 1,259 people in 341 households.
