= Eslamabad-e Gonbad =

Village in Golestan province, Iran

Eslamabad-e Gonbad Persian: اسلام ابادگنبد
- Village
- Location within Iran
- Coordinates: 37°14′01″N 55°16′03″E
- Country: Iran
- Province: Golestan
- County: Gonbad-e Kavus
- District: Central
- Rural District: Fajr

Population (2016)
  - Total: 1,276
- Time zone: UTC+3:30 (IRST)

Eslamabad-e Gonbad (Persian: اسلام ابادگنبد) (Note: Also romanized as Eslāmābād-e Gonbad; also known as Eslāmābād) is a village in Fajr Rural District of the Central District in Gonbad-e Kavus County, Golestan province, Iran.

== Demographics ==
=== Population ===
At the time of the 2006 National Census, the village's population was 1,412 in 317 households. The following census in 2011 counted 1,408 people in 373 households. The 2016 census measured the population of the village as 1,276 people in 371 households.
