= Baraniha =

Village in Golestan province, Iran

Baraniha Persian: بارانيها
- Village
- Location within Iran
- Country: Iran
- Province: Golestan
- County: Gonbad-e Kavus
- District: Central
- Rural District: Fajr

Population (2016)
  - Total: 226
- Time zone: UTC+3:30 (IRST)

Baraniha (Persian: بارانيها) (Note: Also romanized as Bārānīhā; also known as Bālānī and Bārānī) is a village in Fajr Rural District of the Central District in Gonbad-e Kavus County, Golestan province, Iran.

== Demographics ==
=== Population ===
At the time of the 2006 National Census, the village's population was 253 in 58 households. The following census in 2011 counted 189 people in 45 households. The 2016 census measured the population of the village as 226 people in 60 households.
