= Armiabad =

Village in Golestan province, Iran

Armiabad Persian: ارمي آباد
- Village
- Location within Iran
- Coordinates: 37°16′52″N 55°07′55″E
- Country: Iran
- Province: Golestan
- County: Gonbad-e Kavus
- District: Central
- Rural District: Soltanali

Population (2016)
  - Total: 1,695
- Time zone: UTC+3:30 (IRST)

Armiabad (Persian: ارمي آباد) (Note: Also romanized as Ārmīābād; also known as Ārmābād) is a village in Soltanali Rural District of the Central District in Gonbad-e Kavus County, Golestan province, Iran.

== Demographics ==
=== Population ===
At the time of the 2006 National Census, the village's population was 1,126 in 219 households. The following census in 2011 counted 1,476 people in 340 households. The 2016 census measured the population of the village as 1,695 people in 429 households.
