= Taleqan Tappeh =

Village in Golestan province, Iran

Taleqan Tappeh Persian: طالقان تپه
- Village
- Location within Iran
- Coordinates: 37°20′35″N 55°20′41″E
- Country: Iran
- Province: Golestan
- County: Gonbad-e Kavus
- District: Central
- Rural District: Fajr

Population (2016)
  - Total: 843
- Time zone: UTC+3:30 (IRST)

Taleqan Tappeh (Persian: طالقان تپه) (Note: Also romanized as Ţāleqān Tappeh; also known as Shāh Tappeh and Ţāleqānī Tappeh) is a village in Fajr Rural District of the Central District in Gonbad-e Kavus County, Golestan province, Iran.

== Demographics ==
=== Population ===
At the time of the 2006 National Census, the village's population was 783 in 152 households. The following census in 2011 counted 874 people in 224 households. The 2016 census measured the population of the village as 843 people in 256 households.
