= Qarah Mohammad Tappeh =

Village in Golestan province, Iran

Qarah Mohammad Tappeh Persian: قره محمدتپه
- Village
- Location within Iran
- Coordinates: 37°21′32″N 55°11′49″E
- Country: Iran
- Province: Golestan
- County: Gonbad-e Kavus
- District: Central
- Rural District: Aqabad

Population (2016)
  - Total: 667
- Time zone: UTC+3:30 (IRST)

Qarah Mohammad Tappeh (Persian: قره محمدتپه) (Note: Also romanized as Qarah Moḩammad Tappeh and Qareh Moḩammad Tappeh) is a village in Aqabad Rural District of the Central District in Gonbad-e Kavus County, Golestan province, Iran.

== Demographics ==
=== Population ===
At the time of the 2006 National Census, the village's population was 601 in 130 households. The following census in 2011 counted 638 people in 148 households. The 2016 census measured the population of the village as 667 people in 192 households.
