= Chokor Ata =

Village in Golestan province, Iran

Chokor Ata Persian: چكرعطا
- Village
- Location within Iran
- Coordinates: 37°20′09″N 55°17′01″E
- Country: Iran
- Province: Golestan
- County: Gonbad-e Kavus
- District: Central
- Rural District: Aqabad

Population (2016)
  - Total: 1,141
- Time zone: UTC+3:30 (IRST)

Chokor Ata (Persian: چكرعطا) (Note: Also romanized as Chokor 'Aţā; also known as Cheker 'Aţā Bahlakeh) is a village in Aqabad Rural District of the Central District in Gonbad-e Kavus County, Golestan province, Iran.

== Demographics ==
=== Population ===
At the time of the 2006 National Census, the village's population was 983 in 187 households. The following census in 2011 counted 981 people in 256 households. The 2016 census measured the population of the village as 1,141 people in 287 households.
