= Hajjilar Qaleh =

Village in Golestan province, Iran

Hajjilar Qaleh Persian: حاجي لرقلعه
- Village
- Location within Iran
- Coordinates: 37°16′06″N 55°12′20″E
- Country: Iran
- Province: Golestan
- County: Gonbad-e Kavus
- District: Central
- Rural District: Fajr

Population (2016)
  - Total: 3,397
- Time zone: UTC+3:30 (IRST)

Hajjilar Qaleh (Persian: حاجي لرقلعه) (Note: Also romanized as Ḩājjīlar Qal‘eh) is a village in Fajr Rural District of the Central District in Gonbad-e Kavus County, Golestan province, Iran.

== Demographics ==
=== Population ===
At the time of the 2006 National Census, the village's population was 2,267 in 497 households. The following census in 2011 counted 2,992 people in 748 households. The 2016 census measured the population of the village as 3,397 people in 882 households.
