= Aman Qarahjeh =

Village in Golestan province, Iran

Aman Qarahjeh Persian: امان قره جه
- Village
- Location within Iran
- Coordinates: 37°19′24″N 55°16′10″E
- Country: Iran
- Province: Golestan
- County: Gonbad-e Kavus
- District: Central
- Rural District: Aqabad

Population (2016)
  - Total: 1,045
- Time zone: UTC+3:30 (IRST)

Aman Qarahjeh (Persian: امان قره جه) (Note: Also romanized as Amān Qarajeh) is a village in Aqabad Rural District of the Central District in Gonbad-e Kavus County, Golestan province, Iran.

== Demographics ==
=== Population ===
At the time of the 2006 National Census, the village's population was 863 in 173 households. The following census in 2011 counted 921 people in 237 households. The 2016 census measured the population of the village as 1,045 people in 293 households.
