= Tutli-ye Kuchek =

Village in Golestan province, Iran

Tutli-ye Kuchek Persian: توتلي كوچك
- Village
- Location within Iran
- Coordinates: 37°17′19″N 55°13′46″E
- Country: Iran
- Province: Golestan
- County: Gonbad-e Kavus
- District: Central
- Rural District: Aqabad

Population (2016)
  - Total: 1,311
- Time zone: UTC+3:30 (IRST)

Tutli-ye Kuchek (Persian: توتلي كوچك) (Note: Also romanized as Tūtlī-ye Kūchek) is a village in Aqabad Rural District of the Central District in Gonbad-e Kavus County, Golestan province, Iran.

== Demographics ==
=== Population ===
At the time of the 2006 National Census, the village's population was 1,026 in 188 households. The following census in 2011 counted 1,130 people in 279 households. The 2016 census measured the population of the village as 1,311 people in 362 households.
