= Aq Qayeh =

Village in Golestan province, Iran

Aq Qayeh Persian: آق قايه
- Village
- Location within Iran
- Coordinates: 37°16′14″N 55°09′17″E
- Country: Iran
- Province: Golestan
- County: Gonbad-e Kavus
- District: Central
- Rural District: Soltanali

Population (2016)
  - Total: 8,148
- Time zone: UTC+3:30 (IRST)

Aq Qayeh (Persian: آق قايه) (Note: Also romanized as Āq Qāyeh) is a village in Soltanali Rural District of the Central District in Gonbad-e Kavus County, Golestan province, Iran.

== Demographics ==
=== Population ===
At the time of the 2006 National Census, the village's population was 5,114 in 1,157 households. The following census in 2011 counted 7,410 people in 1,780 households. The 2016 census measured the population of the village as 8,148 people in 2,169 households.
