= Bagheli-ye Marama =

Village in Golestan province, Iran

Bagheli-ye Marama Persian: باغلي ماراما
- Village
- Location within Iran
- Coordinates: 37°09′18″N 55°01′27″E
- Country: Iran
- Province: Golestan
- County: Gonbad-e Kavus
- District: Central
- Rural District: Bagheli-ye Marama

Population (2016)
  - Total: 2,276
- Time zone: UTC+3:30 (IRST)

Bagheli-ye Marama (Persian: باغلي ماراما) (Note: Also romanized as Bāghelī-ye Mārāmā and Bāghlī Mārāmā; also known as Yāghlī Mārāmā) is a village in, and the capital of, Bagheli-ye Marama Rural District in the Central District of Gonbad-e Kavus County, Golestan province, Iran.

== Demographics ==
=== Population ===
At the time of the 2006 National Census, the village's population was 2,114 in 449 households. The following census in 2011 counted 2,286 people in 545 households. The 2016 census measured the population of the village as 2,276 people in 583 households.
