= Hali Akhund =

Village in Golestan province, Iran

Hali Akhund Persian: حالي اخوند
- Village
- Location within Iran
- Coordinates: 37°12′55″N 55°03′40″E
- Country: Iran
- Province: Golestan
- County: Gonbad-e Kavus
- District: Central
- Rural District: Soltanali

Population (2016)
  - Total: 2,209
- Time zone: UTC+3:30 (IRST)

Hali Akhund (Persian: حالي اخوند) (Note: Also romanized as Ḩālī Ākhūnd) is a village in Soltanali Rural District of the Central District in Gonbad-e Kavus County, Golestan province, Iran.

== Demographics ==
=== Population ===
At the time of the 2006 National Census, the village's population was 1,683 in 353 households. The following census in 2011 counted 1,941 people in 480 households. The 2016 census measured the population of the village as 2,209 people in 622 households.
