= Gharavelar =

Village in Golestan province, Iran

Gharavelar Persian: غراولر
- Village
- Location within Iran
- Coordinates: 37°21′30″N 55°17′57″E
- Country: Iran
- Province: Golestan
- County: Gonbad-e Kavus
- District: Central
- Rural District: Aqabad

Population (2016)
  - Total: 240
- Time zone: UTC+3:30 (IRST)

Gharavelar (Persian: غراولر) (Note: Also romanized as Gharāvelar) is a village in Aqabad Rural District of the Central District in Gonbad-e Kavus County, Golestan province, Iran.

== Demographics ==
=== Population ===
At the time of the 2006 National Census, the village's population was 185 in 39 households. The following census in 2011 counted 199 people in 50 households. The 2016 census measured the population of the village as 240 people in 67 households.
