= Arab Sorang =

Village in Golestan province, Iran

Arab Sorang Persian: عرب سرنگ
- Village
- Location within Iran
- Coordinates: 37°19′47″N 55°16′47″E
- Country: Iran
- Province: Golestan
- County: Gonbad-e Kavus
- District: Central
- Rural District: Aqabad

Population (2016)
  - Total: 1,436
- Time zone: UTC+3:30 (IRST)

Arab Sorang (Persian: عرب سرنگ) (Note: Also romanized as ‘Arab Sorang) is a village in Aqabad Rural District of the Central District in Gonbad-e Kavus County, Golestan province, Iran.

== Demographics ==
=== Population ===
At the time of the 2006 National Census, the village's population was 1,059 in 215 households. The following census in 2011 counted 1,242 people in 334 households. The 2016 census measured the population of the village as 1,436 people in 383 households.
