= Yarti Qayah =

Village in Golestan province, Iran

Yarti Qayah Persian: يارتي قايه
- Village
- Location within Iran
- Coordinates: 37°12′33″N 54°45′56″E
- Country: Iran
- Province: Golestan
- County: Gonbad-e Kavus
- District: Central
- Rural District: Bagheli-ye Marama

Population (2016)
  - Total: 878
- Time zone: UTC+3:30 (IRST)

Yarti Qayah (Persian: يارتي قايه) (Note: Also romanized as Yārtī Qayah) is a village in Bagheli-ye Marama Rural District of the Central District in Gonbad-e Kavus County, Golestan province, Iran.

== Demographics ==
=== Population ===
At the time of the 2006 National Census, the village's population was 789 in 173 households. The following census in 2011 counted 810 people in 216 households. The 2016 census measured the population of the village as 878 people in 239 households.
