= Baluch Imer Mohammad =

Village in Golestan province, Iran

Baluch Imer Mohammad Persian: بلوچ ايمرمحمد
- Village
- Location within Iran
- Coordinates: 37°09′26″N 54°47′19″E
- Country: Iran
- Province: Golestan
- County: Gonbad-e Kavus
- District: Central
- Rural District: Bagheli-ye Marama

Population (2016)
  - Total: 696
- Time zone: UTC+3:30 (IRST)

Baluch Imer Mohammad (Persian: بلوچ ايمرمحمد) (Note: Also romanized as Balūch Īmer Moḩammad) is a village in Bagheli-ye Marama Rural District of the Central District in Gonbad-e Kavus County, Golestan province, Iran.

== Demographics ==
=== Population ===
At the time of the 2006 National Census, the village's population was 578 in 133 households. The following census in 2011 counted 615 people in 148 households. The 2016 census measured the population of the village as 696 people in 165 households.
