= Sarli Makhtum =

Village in Golestan province, Iran

Sarli Makhtum Persian: سارلي مختوم
- Village
- Location within Iran
- Coordinates: 37°16′55″N 55°13′03″E
- Country: Iran
- Province: Golestan
- County: Gonbad-e Kavus
- District: Central
- Rural District: Aqabad

Population (2016)
  - Total: 1,695
- Time zone: UTC+3:30 (IRST)

Sarli Makhtum (Persian: سارلي مختوم) (Note: Also romanized as Sārlī Makhtūm; also known as Sārlī Makhdūm) is a village in Aqabad Rural District of the Central District in Gonbad-e Kavus County, Golestan province, Iran.

== Demographics ==
=== Population ===
At the time of the 2006 National Census, the village's population was 1,276 in 260 households. The following census in 2011 counted 1,500 people in 378 households. The 2016 census measured the population of the village as 1,695 people in 461 households.
