= Kuchek Olum =

Village in Golestan province, Iran

Kuchek Olum Persian: كوچك الوم
- Village
- Location within Iran
- Coordinates: 37°12′44″N 55°12′44″E
- Country: Iran
- Province: Golestan
- County: Gonbad-e Kavus
- District: Central
- Rural District: Fajr

Population (2016)
  - Total: 1,299
- Time zone: UTC+3:30 (IRST)

Kuchek Olum (Persian: كوچك الوم) (Note: Also romanized as Kūchek Olūm; also known as Kūchek) is a village in Fajr Rural District of the Central District in Gonbad-e Kavus County, Golestan province, Iran.

== Demographics ==
=== Population ===
At the time of the 2006 National Census, the village's population was 1,092 in 269 households. The following census in 2011 counted 1,186 people in 320 households. The 2016 census measured the population of the village as 1,299 people in 372 households.
