= Dikcheh =

Village in Golestan province, Iran

Dikcheh Persian: ديكچه
- Village
- Location within Iran
- Coordinates: 37°15′32″N 54°56′53″E
- Country: Iran
- Province: Golestan
- County: Gonbad-e Kavus
- District: Central
- Rural District: Soltanali

Population (2016)
  - Total: 2,477
- Time zone: UTC+3:30 (IRST)

Dikcheh (Persian: ديكچه) (Note: Also romanized as Dīkcheh; also known as Dīgcheh) is a village in Soltanali Rural District of the Central District in Gonbad-e Kavus County, Golestan province, Iran.

== Demographics ==
=== Population ===
At the time of the 2006 National Census, the village's population was 2,259 in 407 households. The following census in 2011 counted 2,276 people in 577 households. The 2016 census measured the population of the village as 2,477 people in 598 households.
