= Malek Ali Tappeh =

Village in Golestan province, Iran

Malek Ali Tappeh Persian: ملک علي تپه
- Village
- Location within Iran
- Coordinates: 37°24′31″N 55°17′20″E
- Country: Iran
- Province: Golestan
- County: Gonbad-e Kavus
- District: Central
- Rural District: Aqabad

Population (2016)
  - Total: 2,998
- Time zone: UTC+3:30 (IRST)

Malek Ali Tappeh (Persian: ملک علي تپه) (Note: Also romanized as Malek ‘Alī Tappeh) is a village in Aqabad Rural District of the Central District in Gonbad-e Kavus County, Golestan province, Iran.

== Demographics ==
=== Population ===
At the time of the 2006 National Census, the village's population was 2,342 in 519 households. The following census in 2011 counted 2,673 people in 632 households. The 2016 census measured the population of the village as 2,998 people in 744 households.
