= Poli Hajji =

Village in Golestan province, Iran

Poli Hajji Persian: پلي حاجي
- Village
- Location within Iran
- Coordinates: 37°16′00″N 55°11′23″E
- Country: Iran
- Province: Golestan
- County: Gonbad-e Kavus
- District: Central
- Rural District: Fajr

Population (2016)
  - Total: 3,055
- Time zone: UTC+3:30 (IRST)

Poli Hajji (Persian: پلي حاجي) (Note: Also romanized as Polī Ḩājjī; also known as Qolī Ḩājjī) is a village in Fajr Rural District of the Central District in Gonbad-e Kavus County, Golestan province, Iran.

== Demographics ==
=== Population ===
At the time of the 2006 National Census, the village's population was 2,083 in 441 households. The following census in 2011 counted 2,722 people in 697 households. The 2016 census measured the population of the village as 3,055 people in 819 households.
