= Jalain Tappeh =

Village in Golestan province, Iran

Jalain Tappeh Persian: جلائين تپه
- Village
- Location within Iran
- Coordinates: 37°18′38″N 55°16′21″E
- Country: Iran
- Province: Golestan
- County: Gonbad-e Kavus
- District: Central
- Rural District: Fajr

Population (2016)
  - Total: 151
- Time zone: UTC+3:30 (IRST)

Jalain Tappeh (Persian: جلائين تپه) (Note: Also romanized as Jalā'īn Tappeh) is a village in Fajr Rural District of the Central District in Gonbad-e Kavus County, Golestan province, Iran.

== Demographics ==
=== Population ===
At the time of the 2006 National Census, the village's population was 132 in 26 households. The following census in 2011 counted 144 people in 36 households. The 2016 census measured the population of the village as 151 people in 39 households.
