= Kuchek Dig Said =

Village in Golestan province, Iran

Kuchek Dig Said Persian: كوچك ديگ سعيد
- Village
- Location within Iran
- Coordinates: 37°05′03″N 54°56′35″E
- Country: Iran
- Province: Golestan
- County: Gonbad-e Kavus
- District: Central
- Rural District: Bagheli-ye Marama

Population (2016)
  - Total: 769
- Time zone: UTC+3:30 (IRST)

Kuchek Dig Said (Persian: كوچك ديگ سعيد) (Note: Also romanized as Kūchek Dīg Sa‘īd; formerly known as Kuchek Dig Seyyed (كوچك ديگ سي), also romanized as Kūchek Dīg Seyyed; also known as Kūchek Dīgī Seyyed, Kūchek Rīgī Seyyed, and Kūchek Seyyed) is a village in Bagheli-ye Marama Rural District of the Central District in Gonbad-e Kavus County, Golestan province, Iran.

== Demographics ==
=== Population ===
At the time of the 2006 National Census, the village's population, as Kuchek Dig Seyyed, was 612 in 136 households. The following census in 2011 counted 724 people in 196 households, by which time the village was listed as Kuchek Dig Said. The 2016 census measured the population of the village as 769 people in 194 households.
