= Kuchek Khortum =

Village in Golestan province, Iran

Kuchek Khortum Persian: كوچك خرطوم
- Village
- Location within Iran
- Coordinates: 37°05′47″N 54°55′26″E
- Country: Iran
- Province: Golestan
- County: Gonbad-e Kavus
- District: Central
- Rural District: Bagheli-ye Marama

Population (2016)
  - Total: 1,265
- Time zone: UTC+3:30 (IRST)

Kuchek Khortum (Persian: كوچك خرطوم) (Note: Also romanized as Kūchak Khorţūm and Kūchek Khorţūm) is a village in Bagheli-ye Marama Rural District of the Central District in Gonbad-e Kavus County, Golestan province, Iran.

== Demographics ==
=== Population ===
At the time of the 2006 National Census, the village's population was 1,076 in 235 households. The following census in 2011 counted 1,164 people in 328. The 2016 census measured the population of the village as 1,265 people in 355 households.
