= Marjanabad, Golestan =

Village in Golestan province, Iran

Marjanabad Persian: مرجان آباد
- Village
- Country: Iran
- Province: Golestan
- County: Gonbad-e Kavus
- District: Central
- Rural District: Fajr

Population (2016)
  - Total: 80
- Time zone: UTC+3:30 (IRST)

Marjanabad (Persian: مرجان آباد) (Note: Also romanized as Marjānābād) is a village in Fajr Rural District of the Central District in Gonbad-e Kavus County, Golestan province, Iran.

== Demographics ==
=== Population ===
The village did not appear in the 2006 National Census. The following census in 2011 counted 71 people in 19 households. The 2016 census measured the population of the village as 80 people in 24 households.
