= Baylar, Iran =

Village in Golestan province, Iran

Baylar Persian: بايلر
- Village
- Location within Iran
- Coordinates: 37°17′44″N 55°18′24″E
- Country: Iran
- Province: Golestan
- County: Gonbad-e Kavus
- District: Central
- Rural District: Fajr

Population (2016)
  - Total: 1,468
- Time zone: UTC+3:30 (IRST)

Baylar (Persian: بايلر) (Note: Also romanized as Bāylar) is a village in Fajr Rural District of the Central District in Gonbad-e Kavus County, Golestan province, Iran.

== Demographics ==
=== Population ===
At the time of the 2006 National Census, the village's population was 1,398 in 282 households. The following census in 2011 counted 1,481 people in 351 households. The 2016 census measured the population of the village as 1,468 people in 424 households.
