= Sari Bakhsh =

Village in Golestan province, Iran

Sari Bakhsh Persian: ساري بخش
- Village
- Location within Iran
- Coordinates: 37°13′09″N 55°01′21″E
- Country: Iran
- Province: Golestan
- County: Gonbad-e Kavus
- District: Central
- Rural District: Soltanali

Population (2016)
  - Total: 1,950
- Time zone: UTC+3:30 (IRST)

Sari Bakhsh (Persian: ساري بخش) (Note: Also romanized as Sārī Bakhsh) is a village in Soltanali Rural District of the Central District in Gonbad-e Kavus County, Golestan province, Iran.

== Demographics ==
=== Population ===
At the time of the 2006 National Census, the village's population was 1,536 in 316 households. The following census in 2011 counted 1,826 people in 442 households. The 2016 census measured the population of the village as 1,950 people in 513 households.
