= Nurabad, Golestan =

Village in Golestan province, Iran

Nurabad Persian: نور آباد
- Village
- Location within Iran
- Country: Iran
- Province: Golestan
- County: Gonbad-e Kavus
- District: Central
- Rural District: Soltanali

Population (2016)
  - Total: 1,456
- Time zone: UTC+3:30 (IRST)

Nurabad (Persian: نور آباد) (Note: Also romanized as Nūrābād) is a village in Soltanali Rural District of the Central District in Gonbad-e Kavus County, Golestan province, Iran.

== Demographics ==
=== Population ===
At the time of the 2006 National Census, the village's population was 799 in 161 households. The following census in 2011 counted 1,165 people in 261 households. The 2016 census measured the population of the village as 1,456 people in 373 households.
