= Tekehlar =

Village in Golestan province, Iran

Tekehlar Persian: تكه لر
- Village
- Location within Iran
- Coordinates: 37°21′49″N 55°17′33″E
- Country: Iran
- Province: Golestan
- County: Gonbad-e Kavus
- District: Central
- Rural District: Aqabad

Population (2016)
  - Total: 1,180
- Time zone: UTC+3:30 (IRST)

Tekehlar (Persian: تكه لر) (Note: Also known as Tekeh Sar) is a village in Aqabad Rural District of the Central District in Gonbad-e Kavus County, Golestan province, Iran.

== Demographics ==
=== Population ===
At the time of the 2006 National Census, the village's population was 966 in 184 households. The following census in 2011 counted 1,033 people in 242 households. The 2016 census measured the population of the village as 1,180 people in 289 households.
