= Beyg =

Beyg may refer to:

- Qaleh Beyg Qarah Cheshmeh
- Beyk, placename
- Bey, title for a chieftain
