= Molla Taqi =

Village in Golestan province, Iran

Molla Taqi Persian: ملاتقي
- Village
- Location within Iran
- Country: Iran
- Province: Golestan
- County: Gonbad-e Kavus
- District: Central
- Rural District: Fajr

Population (2016)
  - Total: 4,397
- Time zone: UTC+3:30 (IRST)

Molla Taqi (Persian: ملاتقي) (Note: Also romanized as Mollā Taqī) is a village in Fajr Rural District of the Central District in Gonbad-e Kavus County, Golestan province, Iran.

== Demographics ==
=== Population ===
At the time of the 2006 National Census, the village's population was 1,964 in 473 households. The following census in 2011 counted 3,417 people in 959 households. The 2016 census measured the population of the village as 4,397 people in 1,272 households.
