= Kuchek Yurt Sheykhan =

Village in Golestan province, Iran

Kuchek Yurt Sheykhan Persian: كوچك يورت شيخان
- Village
- Location within Iran
- Coordinates: 37°17′22″N 55°15′11″E
- Country: Iran
- Province: Golestan
- County: Gonbad-e Kavus
- District: Central
- Rural District: Fajr

Population (2016)
  - Total: 1,119
- Time zone: UTC+3:30 (IRST)

Kuchek Yurt Sheykhan (Persian: كوچك يورت شيخان) (Note: Also romanized as Kūchek Yūrt Sheykhān; also known as Yūrt Sheykhān) is a village in Fajr Rural District of the Central District in Gonbad-e Kavus County, Golestan province, Iran.

== Demographics ==
=== Population ===
At the time of the 2006 National Census, the village's population was 884 in 184 households. The following census in 2011 counted 976 people in 238 households. The 2016 census measured the population of the village as 1,119 people in 307 households.
