= Sarjeh Kor =

Village in Golestan province, Iran

Sarjeh Kor Persian: سارجه كر
- Village
- Location within Iran
- Coordinates: 37°19′39″N 55°18′33″E
- Country: Iran
- Province: Golestan
- County: Gonbad-e Kavus
- District: Central
- Rural District: Fajr

Population (2016)
  - Total: 3,002
- Time zone: UTC+3:30 (IRST)

Sarjeh Kor (Persian: سارجه كر) (Note: Also romanized as Sārjeh Kor; also known as Sārjeh Kūr and Sarjeh Kūr) is a village in Fajr Rural District of the Central District in Gonbad-e Kavus County, Golestan province, Iran.

== Demographics ==
=== Population ===
At the time of the 2006 National Census, the village's population was 2,748 in 573 households. The following census in 2011 counted 2,831 people in 689 households. The 2016 census measured the population of the village as 3,002 people in 825 households.
