= Taqanpay-e Patakeh =

Village in Golestan province, Iran

Taqanpay-e Patakeh Persian: تاقان پاي پتكه
- Village
- Location within Iran
- Coordinates: 37°11′37″N 54°59′51″E
- Country: Iran
- Province: Golestan
- County: Gonbad-e Kavus
- District: Central
- Rural District: Bagheli-ye Marama

Population (2016)
  - Total: 574
- Time zone: UTC+3:30 (IRST)

Taqanpay-e Patakeh (Persian: تاقان پاي پتكه) (Note: Also romanized as Tāqānpāy-e Patakeh; also known as Tāqān Pāy Tīkeh and Tāqānbāy-e Patakeh) is a village in Bagheli-ye Marama Rural District of the Central District in Gonbad-e Kavus County, Golestan province, Iran.

== Demographics ==
=== Population ===
At the time of the 2006 National Census, the village's population was 538 in 112 households. The following census in 2011 counted 558 people in 140 households. The 2016 census measured the population of the village as 574 people in 162 households.
