= Aman Gol Tappeh =

Village in Golestan province, Iran

Aman Gol Tappeh Persian: امان گل تپه
- Village
- Location within Iran
- Coordinates: 37°26′07″N 55°13′00″E
- Country: Iran
- Province: Golestan
- County: Gonbad-e Kavus
- District: Central
- Rural District: Aqabad

Population (2016)
  - Total: 658
- Time zone: UTC+3:30 (IRST)

Aman Gol Tappeh (Persian: امان گل تپه) (Note: Also romanized as Aman Gal Tappeh, Amān Gal Tappeh, and Amān Gol Tappeh; also known as Amān Galū Tappeh) is a village in Aqabad Rural District of the Central District in Gonbad-e Kavus County, Golestan province, Iran.

== Demographics ==
=== Population ===
At the time of the 2006 National Census, the village's population was 550 in 86 households. The following census in 2011 counted 611 people in 146 households. The 2016 census measured the population of the village as 658 people in 171 households.
