= Tuqalajiq Tappeh =

Village in Golestan province, Iran

Tuqalajiq Tappeh Persian: توقلاجيق تپه
- Village
- Location within Iran
- Coordinates: 37°14′10″N 54°52′10″E
- Country: Iran
- Province: Golestan
- County: Gonbad-e Kavus
- District: Central
- Rural District: Bagheli-ye Marama

Population (2016)
  - Total: 564
- Time zone: UTC+3:30 (IRST)

Tuqalajiq Tappeh (Persian: توقلاجيق تپه) (Note: Also romanized as Tūqalājīq Tappeh) is a village in Bagheli-ye Marama Rural District of the Central District in Gonbad-e Kavus County, Golestan province, Iran.

== Demographics ==
=== Population ===
At the time of the 2006 National Census, the village's population was 464 in 101 households. The following census in 2011 counted 563 people in 141 households. The 2016 census measured the population of the village as 564 people in 138 households.
