= Mohammad Imer =

Village in Golestan province, Iran

Mohammad Imer Persian: محمد ايمر
- Village
- Location within Iran
- Coordinates: 37°09′46″N 54°48′11″E
- Country: Iran
- Province: Golestan
- County: Gonbad-e Kavus
- District: Central
- Rural District: Bagheli-ye Marama

Population (2016)
  - Total: 864
- Time zone: UTC+3:30 (IRST)

Mohammad Imer (Persian: محمد ايمر (Note: Also romanized as Moḩammad Īmer ; formerly known as Imer Mohammad (ايمرمحمد), also romanized as Īmer Moḩammad) is a village in Bagheli-ye Marama Rural District of the Central District in Gonbad-e Kavus County, Golestan province, Iran.

== Demographics ==
=== Population ===
At the time of the 2006 National Census, the village's population, as Imer Mohammad, was 1,481 in 334 households. The following census in 2011 counted 837 people in 194 households, by which time the village as listed as Mohammad Imer. The 2016 census measured the population of the village as 864 people in 228 households.
