= Qazaqoli =

Village in Golestan province, Iran

Qazaqoli Persian: قزاقلي
- Village
- Location within Iran
- Coordinates: 37°14′05″N 55°01′51″E
- Country: Iran
- Province: Golestan
- County: Gonbad-e Kavus
- District: Central
- Rural District: Soltanali

Population (2016)
  - Total: 1,323
- Time zone: UTC+3:30 (IRST)

Qazaqoli (Persian: قزاقلي) (Note: Also romanized as Qazāqolī; also known as Ghazāghī) is a village in Soltanali Rural District of the Central District in Gonbad-e Kavus County, Golestan province, Iran.

== Demographics ==
=== Population ===
At the time of the 2006 National Census, the village's population was 932 in 191 households. The following census in 2011 counted 1,155 people in 270 households. The 2016 census measured the population of the village as 1,323 people in 354 households.
