= Hajji Balkhan =

Village in Golestan province, Iran

Hajji Balkhan Persian: حاجي بلخان
- Village
- Location within Iran
- Coordinates: 37°12′34″N 55°17′15″E
- Country: Iran
- Province: Golestan
- County: Gonbad-e Kavus
- District: Central
- Rural District: Fajr

Population (2016)
  - Total: 1,723
- Time zone: UTC+3:30 (IRST)

Hajji Balkhan (Persian: حاجي بلخان) (Note: Also romanized as Haji Balkhan, Ḩājjī Balkhān, and Ḩājjī Belkhān; also known as Bālā Khān Ḩājjī) is a village in Fajr Rural District of the Central District in Gonbad-e Kavus County, Golestan province, Iran.

== Demographics ==
=== Population ===
At the time of the 2006 National Census, the village's population was 1,552 in 329 households. The following census in 2011 counted 1,875 people in 457 households. The 2016 census measured the population of the village as 1,723 people in 477 households.
