= Charvayolqi =

Village in Golestan province, Iran

Charvayolqi Persian: چاروايلقي
- Village
- Location within Iran
- Coordinates: 37°14′34″N 55°00′08″E
- Country: Iran
- Province: Golestan
- County: Gonbad-e Kavus
- District: Central
- Rural District: Soltanali

Population (2016)
  - Total: 953
- Time zone: UTC+3:30 (IRST)

Charvayolqi (Persian: چاروايلقي) (Note: Also romanized as Chārvāyolqī; also known as Chārvābolghāy and Chārvāyolqāy) is a village in Soltanali Rural District of the Central District in Gonbad-e Kavus County, Golestan province, Iran.

== Demographics ==
=== Population ===
At the time of the 2006 National Census, the village's population was 664 in 138 households. The following census in 2011 counted 963 people in 217 households. The 2016 census measured the population of the village as 953 people in 258 households.
