= Quch Morad =

Village in Golestan province, Iran

Quch Morad Persian: قوچ مراد
- Village
- Location within Iran
- Coordinates: 37°10′32″N 54°51′39″E
- Country: Iran
- Province: Golestan
- County: Gonbad-e Kavus
- District: Central
- Rural District: Bagheli-ye Marama

Population (2016)
  - Total: 1,280
- Time zone: UTC+3:30 (IRST)

Quch Morad (Persian: قوچ مراد) (Note: Also romanized as Qūch Morād) is a village in Bagheli-ye Marama Rural District of the Central District in Gonbad-e Kavus County, Golestan province, Iran.

== Demographics ==
=== Population ===
At the time of the 2006 National Census, the village's population was 1,028 in 205 households. The following census in 2011 counted 1,173 people in 295 households. The 2016 census measured the population of the village as 1,280 people in 310 households.
