= Salaq-e Ghayib =

Village in Golestan province, Iran

Salaq-e Ghayib Persian: سلاق غايب
- Village
- Location within Iran
- Coordinates: 37°07′25″N 54°59′03″E
- Country: Iran
- Province: Golestan
- County: Gonbad-e Kavus
- District: Central
- Rural District: Bagheli-ye Marama

Population (2016)
  - Total: 1,186
- Time zone: UTC+3:30 (IRST)

Salaq-e Ghayib (Persian: سلاق غايب) (Note: Also romanized as Salāq Ghāyib and Salāq-e Ghāyib) is a village in Bagheli-ye Marama Rural District of the Central District in Gonbad-e Kavus County, Golestan province, Iran.

== Demographics ==
=== Population ===
At the time of the 2006 National Census, the village's population was 980 in 206 households. The following census in 2011 counted 1,133 people in 302 households. The 2016 census measured the population of the village as 1,186 people in 335 households.
