= Shahrak-e Golestan Emam Khomeyni =

Village in Golestan province, Iran

Shahrak-e Golestan Emam Khomeyni Persian: شهرك گلستان امام خميني
- Village
- Country: Iran
- Province: Golestan
- County: Gonbad-e Kavus
- District: Central
- Rural District: Aqabad

Population (2016)
  - Total: 222
- Time zone: UTC+3:30 (IRST)

Shahrak-e Golestan Emam Khomeyni (Persian: شهرك گلستان امام خميني) (Note: Also romanized as Shahraḵ-e Golestān Emām Khomeynī) is a village in Aqabad Rural District of the Central District in Gonbad-e Kavus County, Golestan province, Iran.

== Demographics ==
=== Population ===
At the time of the 2006 National Census, the village's population was 188 in 41 households. The following census in 2011 counted 221 people in 57 households. The 2016 census measured the population of the village as 222 people in 64 households.
