= Qul Hajji =

Village in Golestan province, Iran

Qul Hajji Persian: قول حاجي
- Village
- Location within Iran
- Coordinates: 37°10′58″N 55°11′49″E
- Country: Iran
- Province: Golestan
- County: Gonbad-e Kavus
- District: Central
- Rural District: Fajr

Population (2016)
  - Total: 1,528
- Time zone: UTC+3:30 (IRST)

Qul Hajji (Persian: قول حاجي) (Note: Also romanized as Qūl Ḩājjī; also known as Qolhaji) is a village in Fajr Rural District of the Central District in Gonbad-e Kavus County, Golestan province, Iran.

== Demographics ==
=== Population ===
At the time of the 2006 National Census, the village's population was 1,160 in 252 households. The following census in 2011 counted 1,303 people in 345 households. The 2016 census measured the population of the village as 1,528 people in 431 households.
