= Aqabad =

Village in Golestan province, Iran

Aqabad Persian: آق آباد
- Village
- Location within Iran
- Coordinates: 37°18′01″N 55°14′38″E
- Country: Iran
- Province: Golestan
- County: Gonbad-e Kavus
- District: Central
- Rural District: Aqabad

Population (2016)
  - Total: 5,534
- Time zone: UTC+3:30 (IRST)

Aqabad (Persian: آق آباد) (Note: Also romanized as Āqābād) is a village in, and the capital of, Aqabad Rural District in the Central District of Gonbad-e Kavus County, Golestan province, Iran.

== Demographics ==
=== Population ===
At the time of the 2006 National Census, the village's population was 4,085 in 763 households. The following census in 2011 counted 4,899 people in 1,259 households. The 2016 census measured the population of the village as 5,534 people in 1,403 households. It was the most populous village in its rural district.
