= Atalar, Iran =

Village in Golestan province, Iran

Atalar Persian: عطالر
- Village
- Location within Iran
- Coordinates: 37°22′12″N 55°17′58″E
- Country: Iran
- Province: Golestan
- County: Gonbad-e Kavus
- District: Central
- Rural District: Aqabad

Population (2016)
  - Total: 1,433
- Time zone: UTC+3:30 (IRST)

Atalar (Persian: عطالر) (Note: Also romanized as ‘Aţālar) is a village in Aqabad Rural District of the Central District in Gonbad-e Kavus County, Golestan province, Iran.

== Demographics ==
=== Population ===
At the time of the 2006 National Census, the village's population was 1,054 in 202 households. The following census in 2011 counted 1,155 people in 278 households. The 2016 census measured the population of the village as 1,433 people in 366 households.
