= Tappeh Nurjan =

Village in Golestan province, Iran

Tappeh Nurjan Persian: تپه نورجان
- Village
- Location within Iran
- Coordinates: 37°12′59″N 54°52′38″E
- Country: Iran
- Province: Golestan
- County: Gonbad-e Kavus
- District: Central
- Rural District: Bagheli-ye Marama

Population (2016)
  - Total: 638
- Time zone: UTC+3:30 (IRST)

Tappeh Nurjan (Persian: تپه نورجان) (Note: Also romanized as Tappeh Nūrjān) is a village in Bagheli-ye Marama Rural District of the Central District in Gonbad-e Kavus County, Golestan province, Iran.

== Demographics ==
=== Population ===
At the time of the 2006 National Census, the village's population was 496 in 112 households. The following census in 2011 counted 531 people in 136 households. The 2016 census measured the population of the village as 638 people in 170 households.
