= Salaq-e Aman Kharlar =

Village in Golestan province, Iran

Salaq-e Aman Kharlar Persian: سلاق امان خرلر
- Village
- Location within Iran
- Coordinates: 37°11′15″N 54°56′33″E
- Country: Iran
- Province: Golestan
- County: Gonbad-e Kavus
- District: Central
- Rural District: Bagheli-ye Marama

Population (2016)
  - Total: 797
- Time zone: UTC+3:30 (IRST)

Salaq-e Aman Kharlar (Persian: سلاق امان خرلر) (Note: Also romanized as Salāq-e Āmān Kharlar; also known as Salāqāmānlar) is a village in Bagheli-ye Marama Rural District of the Central District in Gonbad-e Kavus County, Golestan province, Iran.

== Demographics ==
=== Population ===
At the time of the 2006 National Census, the village's population was 745 in 166 households. The following census in 2011 counted 780 people in 188 households. The 2016 census measured the population of the village as 797 people in 217 households.
