= Soltanali =

Village in Golestan province, Iran

Soltanali Persian: سلطانعلي
- Village
- Location within Iran
- Coordinates: 37°13′51″N 55°03′34″E
- Country: Iran
- Province: Golestan
- County: Gonbad-e Kavus
- District: Central
- Rural District: Soltanali

Population (2016)
  - Total: 1,699
- Time zone: UTC+3:30 (IRST)

Soltanali (Persian: سلطانعلي) (Note: Also romanized as Solţān ‘Alī and Solţān‘alī) is a village in, and the capital of, Soltanali Rural District in the Central District of Gonbad-e Kavus County, Golestan province, Iran.

== Demographics ==
=== Population ===
At the time of the 2006 National Census, the village's population was 1,405 in 249 households. The following census in 2011 counted 1,576 people in 360 households. The 2016 census measured the population of the village as 1,699 people in 461 households.
