= Qezeljeh-ye Sofla =

Qezeljeh-ye Sofla (Persian: قزلجه سفلي) may refer to:

- Qezeljeh-ye Sofla, West Azerbaijan
- Qezeljeh-ye Sofla, Zanjan
