= Molla Ali Tappeh =

Village in Golestan province, Iran

Molla Ali Tappeh Persian: ملاعلي تپه
- Village
- Location within Iran
- Coordinates: 37°22′59″N 55°12′39″E
- Country: Iran
- Province: Golestan
- County: Gonbad-e Kavus
- District: Central
- Rural District: Aqabad

Population (2016)
  - Total: 289
- Time zone: UTC+3:30 (IRST)

Molla Ali Tappeh (Persian: ملاعلي تپه) (Note: Also romanized as Mollā ‘Alī Tappeh) is a village in Aqabad Rural District of the Central District in Gonbad-e Kavus County, Golestan province, Iran.

== Demographics ==
=== Population ===
At the time of the 2006 National Census, the village's population was 213 in 39 households. The following census in 2011 counted 241 people in 57 households. The 2016 census measured the population of the village as 289 people in 76 households.
