= Kaka, Golestan =

Village in Golestan province, Iran

Kaka Persian: كاكا
- Village
- Location within Iran
- Coordinates: 37°09′40″N 55°05′44″E
- Country: Iran
- Province: Golestan
- County: Gonbad-e Kavus
- District: Central
- Rural District: Bagheli-ye Marama

Population (2016)
  - Total: 2,140
- Time zone: UTC+3:30 (IRST)

Kaka (Persian: كاكا) (Note: Also romanized as Kākā; also known as Kākū) is a village in Bagheli-ye Marama Rural District of the Central District in Gonbad-e Kavus County, Golestan province, Iran.

== Demographics ==
=== Population ===
At the time of the 2006 National Census, the village's population was 1,733 in 378 households. The following census in 2011 counted 2,135 people in 554 households. The 2016 census measured the population of the village as 2,140 people in 583 households.
