= Pashmak, Iran =

Pashmak, Iran (Persian: پشمك) may refer to:

- Pashmak-e Towq Tamish
- Pashmak Panadeh
