= Kurekli =

Village in Golestan province, Iran

Kurekli Persian: كوركلي
- Village
- Location within Iran
- Coordinates: 37°13′21″N 55°06′39″E
- Country: Iran
- Province: Golestan
- County: Gonbad-e Kavus
- District: Central
- Rural District: Soltanali

Population (2016)
  - Total: 673
- Time zone: UTC+3:30 (IRST)

Kurekli (Persian: كوركلي) (Note: Also romanized as Kūreklī) is a village in Soltanali Rural District of the Central District in Gonbad-e Kavus County, Golestan province, Iran.

== Demographics ==
=== Population ===
At the time of the 2006 National Census, the village's population was 525 in 113 households. The following census in 2011 counted 613 people in 149 households. The 2016 census measured the population of the village as 673 people in 177 households.
