= Someh Makhtum =

Village in Golestan province, Iran

Someh Makhtum Persian: ثمه مختوم
- Village
- Location within Iran
- Coordinates: 37°12′44″N 55°10′58″E
- Country: Iran
- Province: Golestan
- County: Gonbad-e Kavus
- District: Central
- Rural District: Fajr

Population (2016)
  - Total: 1,148
- Time zone: UTC+3:30 (IRST)

Someh Makhtum (Persian: ثمه مختوم) (Note: Also romanized as Someh Makhtūm; also known as Sa‘eh Makhtūm and Som Makhtūm) is a village in Fajr Rural District of the Central District in Gonbad-e Kavus County, Golestan province, Iran.

== Demographics ==
=== Population ===
At the time of the 2006 National Census, the village's population was 1,090 in 240 households. The following census in 2011 counted 1,130 people in 280 households. The 2016 census measured the population of the village as 1,148 people in 304 households.
