= Zaboliabad =

Village in Golestan province, Iran

Zaboliabad Persian: زابلي آباد
- Village
- Location within Iran
- Coordinates: 37°13′55″N 55°12′13″E
- Country: Iran
- Province: Golestan
- County: Gonbad-e Kavus
- District: Central
- Rural District: Fajr

Population (2016)
  - Total: 4,738
- Time zone: UTC+3:30 (IRST)

Zaboliabad (Persian: زابلي آباد) (Note: Also romanized as Zābolīābād; also known as Zābolābād) is a village in Fajr Rural District of the Central District in Gonbad-e Kavus County, Golestan province, Iran.

== Demographics ==
=== Population ===
At the time of the 2006 National Census, the village's population was 3,942 in 894 households. The following census in 2011 counted 4,577 people in 1,217 households. The 2016 census measured the population of the village as 4,738 people in 1,385 households. It was the most populous village in its rural district.
