= Shokranlu =

Shokranlu (Persian: شكرانلو) may refer to:

- Shokranlu, Howmeh, a village in Shirvan County, North Khorasan Province, Iran
- Shokranlu, Sivkanlu, a village in Shirvan County, North Khroasan Province, Iran
