= Hasanabad, Golestan =

Village in Golestan province, Iran

Hasanabad Persian: حسن آباد
- Village
- Location within Iran
- Coordinates: 37°14′21″N 55°14′12″E
- Country: Iran
- Province: Golestan
- County: Gonbad-e Kavus
- District: Central
- Rural District: Fajr

Population (2016)
  - Total: 1,532
- Time zone: UTC+3:30 (IRST)

Hasanabad (Persian: حسن آباد) (Note: Also romanized as Ḩasanābād) is a village in Fajr Rural District of the Central District in Gonbad-e Kavus County, Golestan province, Iran.

== Demographics ==
=== Population ===
At the time of the 2006 National Census, the village's population was 1,277 in 279 households. The following census in 2011 counted 1,459 people in 368 households. The 2016 census measured the population of the village, as 1,532 people in 452 households.
