= Egri Bughaz =

Village in Golestan province, Iran

Egri Bughaz Persian: اگري بوغاز
- Village
- Location within Iran
- Coordinates: 37°24′15″N 55°08′05″E
- Country: Iran
- Province: Golestan
- County: Gonbad-e Kavus
- District: Central
- Rural District: Aqabad

Population (2016)
  - Total: 950
- Time zone: UTC+3:30 (IRST)

Egri Bughaz (Persian: اگري بوغاز) (Note: Also romanized as Egrī Būghāz; also known as Eqrī Bū‘āz and Eqrī Būghāz) is a village in Aqabad Rural District of the Central District in Gonbad-e Kavus County, Golestan province, Iran.

== Demographics ==
=== Population ===
At the time of the 2006 National Census, the village's population was 796 in 174 households. The following census in 2011 counted 866 people in 237 households. The 2016 census measured the population of the village as 950 people in 245 households.
