= Kaskan Qajaq =

Village in Golestan province, Iran

Kaskan Qajaq Persian: كسكن قجق
- Village
- Location within Iran
- Coordinates: 37°22′44″N 55°18′08″E
- Country: Iran
- Province: Golestan
- County: Gonbad-e Kavus
- District: Central
- Rural District: Aqabad

Population (2016)
  - Total: 1,209
- Time zone: UTC+3:30 (IRST)

Kaskan Qajaq (Persian: كسكن قجق) (Note: Also romanized as Kasḵan Qajaq; also known as Kasgenqojoq) is a village in Aqabad Rural District of the Central District in Gonbad-e Kavus County, Golestan province, Iran.

== Demographics ==
=== Population ===
At the time of the 2006 National Census, the village's population was 991 in 182 households. The following census in 2011 counted 1,141 people in 257 households. The 2016 census measured the population of the village as 1,209 people in 314 households.
