= Buin-e Owzin Qajaq =

Village in Golestan province, Iran

Buin-e Owzin Qajaq Persian: بوئين اوزين قجق
- Village
- Country: Iran
- Province: Golestan
- County: Gonbad-e Kavus
- District: Central
- Rural District: Aqabad

Population (2016)
  - Total: 662
- Time zone: UTC+3:30 (IRST)

Buin-e Owzin Qajaq (Persian: بوئين اوزين قجق) (Note: Also romanized as Bū'īn Owzīn Qajaq) is a village in Aqabad Rural District of the Central District in Gonbad-e Kavus County, Golestan province, Iran.

== Demographics ==
=== Population ===
At the time of the 2006 National Census, the village's population was 620 in 102 households. The following census in 2011 counted 653 people in 146 households. The 2016 census measured the population of the village as 662 people in 185 households.
