= Avaz Hajji =

Village in Golestan province, Iran

Avaz Hajji Persian: عوض حاجي
- Village
- Location within Iran
- Coordinates: 37°24′47″N 55°11′25″E
- Country: Iran
- Province: Golestan
- County: Gonbad-e Kavus
- District: Central
- Rural District: Aqabad

Population (2016)
  - Total: 744
- Time zone: UTC+3:30 (IRST)

Avaz Hajji (Persian: عوض حاجي) (Note: Also romanized as ‘Avaẕ Ḩājjī) is a village in Aqabad Rural District of the Central District in Gonbad-e Kavus County, Golestan province, Iran.

== Demographics ==
=== Population ===
At the time of the 2006 National Census, the village's population was 658 in 136 households. The following census in 2011 counted 733 people in 170 households. The 2016 census measured the population of the village as 744 people in 209 households.
