= Hadiabad, Golestan =

Village in Golestan province, Iran

Hadiabad Persian: هادي اباد
- Village
- Location within Iran
- Coordinates: 37°07′55″N 55°00′04″E
- Country: Iran
- Province: Golestan
- County: Gonbad-e Kavus
- District: Central
- Rural District: Bagheli-ye Marama

Population (2016)
  - Total: 510
- Time zone: UTC+3:30 (IRST)

Hadiabad (Persian: هادي اباد) (Note: Also romanized as Hādīābād) is a village in Bagheli-ye Marama Rural District of the Central District in Gonbad-e Kavus County, Golestan province, Iran.

== Demographics ==
=== Population ===
At the time of the 2006 National Census, the village's population was 684 in 153 households. The following census in 2011 counted 475 people in 124 households. The 2016 census measured the population of the village as 510 people in 153 households.
