= Qur Polcheh =

Village in Golestan province, Iran

Qur Polcheh Persian: قورپلچه
- Village
- Location within Iran
- Coordinates: 37°14′50″N 54°59′24″E
- Country: Iran
- Province: Golestan
- County: Gonbad-e Kavus
- District: Central
- Rural District: Soltanali

Population (2016)
  - Total: 3,044
- Time zone: UTC+3:30 (IRST)

Qur Polcheh (Persian: قورپلچه) (Note: Also romanized as Qūr Polcheh; also known as Qūr Polījeh, Qūr Poljeh, and Qūrīljeh) is a village in Soltanali Rural District of the Central District in Gonbad-e Kavus County, Golestan province, Iran.

== Demographics ==
=== Population ===
At the time of the 2006 National Census, the village's population was 2,283 in 409 households. The following census in 2011 counted 2,744 people in 660 households. The 2016 census measured the population of the village as 3,044 people in 747 households.
