= Ishanlar =

Village in Golestan province, Iran

Ishanlar Persian: ايشانلر
- Village
- Location within Iran
- Coordinates: 37°24′48″N 55°21′48″E
- Country: Iran
- Province: Golestan
- County: Gonbad-e Kavus
- District: Central
- Rural District: Aqabad

Population (2016)
  - Total: 480
- Time zone: UTC+3:30 (IRST)

Ishanlar (Persian: ايشانلر) (Note: Also romanized as Īshānlar; also known as Īshālar and Yashālar) is a village in Aqabad Rural District of the Central District in Gonbad-e Kavus County, Golestan province, Iran.

== Demographics ==
=== Population ===
At the time of the 2006 National Census, the village's population was 456 in 122 households. The following census in 2011 counted 386 people in 102 households. The 2016 census measured the population of the village as 480 people in 132 households.
