= Salaq-e Yasi Tappeh =

Village in Golestan province, Iran

Salaq-e Yasi Tappeh Persian: سلاق ياسي تپه
- Village
- Location within Iran
- Coordinates: 37°13′54″N 54°54′33″E
- Country: Iran
- Province: Golestan
- County: Gonbad-e Kavus
- District: Central
- Rural District: Bagheli-ye Marama

Population (2016)
  - Total: 807
- Time zone: UTC+3:30 (IRST)

Salaq-e Yasi Tappeh (Persian: سلاق ياسي تپه) (Note: Also romanized as Salāq-e Yāsī Tappeh; also known as Salāq-e Yās Tappeh) is a village in Bagheli-ye Marama Rural District of the Central District in Gonbad-e Kavus County, Golestan province, Iran.

== Demographics ==
=== Population ===
At the time of the 2006 National Census, the village's population was 778 in 169 households. The following census in 2011 counted 902 people in 231 households. The 2016 census measured the population of the village as 807 people in 215 households.
