= Yamar =

Yamar may refer to:

- Yamar Samb (born 1952), Senegalese basketball player
- Yamar Molla Sari, or Imer Molla Sari, a village in Iran
- "Yamar", a song by Timujin from Buddha Bar XX, 2018

== See also ==
- Yamari, a Tibetan Buddhist meditation deity
- Yammer, a social networking service
- Yanmar, a Japanese engine and heavy-machine manufacturer
