= Quinli =

Village in Golestan province, Iran

Quinli Persian: قوينلي
- Village
- Location within Iran
- Coordinates: 37°13′35″N 55°17′45″E
- Country: Iran
- Province: Golestan
- County: Gonbad-e Kavus
- District: Central
- Rural District: Fajr

Population (2016)
  - Total: 1,285
- Time zone: UTC+3:30 (IRST)

Quinli (Persian: قوينلي) (Note: Also romanized as Qowyonlī and Qū’īnlī; also known as Qūnīlī) is a village in Fajr Rural District of the Central District in Gonbad-e Kavus County, Golestan province, Iran.

== Demographics ==
=== Population ===
At the time of the 2006 National Census, the village's population was 1,349 in 334 households. The following census in 2011 counted 1,367 people in 381 households. The 2016 census measured the population of the village as 1,285 people in 397 households.
