= Imer Tureh Molla =

Village in Golestan province, Iran

Imer Tureh Molla Persian: ايمرتوره ملا
- Village
- Location within Iran
- Coordinates: 37°07′31″N 54°52′28″E
- Country: Iran
- Province: Golestan
- County: Gonbad-e Kavus
- District: Central
- Rural District: Bagheli-ye Marama

Population (2016)
  - Total: 915
- Time zone: UTC+3:30 (IRST)

Imer Tureh Molla (Persian: ايمرتوره ملا) (Note: Also romanized as Īmer Tūreh Mollā; also known as Īmer Tūr Mollā) is a village in Bagheli-ye Marama Rural District of the Central District in Gonbad-e Kavus County, Golestan province, Iran.

== Demographics ==
=== Population ===
At the time of the 2006 National Census, the village's population was 771 in 173 households. The following census in 2011 counted 803 people in 189 households. The 2016 census measured the population of the village as 915 people in 239 households.
