= Gadmabad =

Village in Golestan province, Iran

Gadmabad Persian: گدم آباد
- Village
- Location within Iran
- Coordinates: 37°15′28″N 55°08′44″E
- Country: Iran
- Province: Golestan
- County: Gonbad-e Kavus
- District: Central
- Rural District: Soltanali

Population (2016)
  - Total: 8,250
- Time zone: UTC+3:30 (IRST)

Gadmabad (Persian: گدم آباد) (Note: Also romanized as Gadamābād and Gadmābād) is a village in Soltanali Rural District of the Central District in Gonbad-e Kavus County, Golestan province, Iran.

== Demographics ==
=== Population ===
At the time of the 2006 National Census, the village's population was 5,527 in 1,127 households. The following census in 2011 counted 7,286 people in 1,756 households. The 2016 census measured the population of the village as 8,250 people in 2,144 households. It was the most populous village in its rural district.
