= Bozaqabad =

Village in Golestan province, Iran

Bozaqabad Persian: بزاق آباد
- Village
- Location within Iran
- Coordinates: 37°19′03″N 55°16′51″E
- Country: Iran
- Province: Golestan
- County: Gonbad-e Kavus
- District: Central
- Rural District: Fajr

Population (2016)
  - Total: 120
- Time zone: UTC+3:30 (IRST)

Bozaqabad (Persian: بزاق آباد) (Note: Also romanized as Bozāqābād) is a village in Fajr Rural District of the Central District in Gonbad-e Kavus County, Golestan province, Iran.

== Demographics ==
=== Population ===
At the time of the 2006 National Census, the village's population was 123 in 20 households. The following census in 2011 counted 123 people in 33 households. The 2016 census measured the population of the village as 120 people in 40 households.
