= Imer-e Mohammad Qoli Akhund =

Village in Golestan province, Iran

Imer-e Mohammad Qoli Akhund Persian: ايمرمحمدقلي اخوند
- Village
- Location within Iran
- Coordinates: 37°17′00″N 55°14′54″E
- Country: Iran
- Province: Golestan
- County: Gonbad-e Kavus
- District: Central
- Rural District: Fajr

Population (2016)
  - Total: 1,158
- Time zone: UTC+3:30 (IRST)

Imer-e Mohammad Qoli Akhund (Persian: ايمرمحمدقلي اخوند) (Note: Also romanized as Īmer-e Moḩammad Qolī Ākhūnd) is a village in Fajr Rural District of the Central District in Gonbad-e Kavus County, Golestan province, Iran.

== Demographics ==
=== Population ===
At the time of the 2006 National Census, the village's population was 948 in 179 households. The following census in 2011 counted 1,083 people in 267 households. The 2016 census measured the population of the village as 1,158 people in 320 households.
