= Fajr, Golestan =

Village in Golestan province, Iran

Fajr Persian: فجر
- Village
- Location within Iran
- Country: Iran
- Province: Golestan
- County: Gonbad-e Kavus
- District: Central
- Rural District: Fajr

Population (2016)
  - Total: 1,792
- Time zone: UTC+3:30 (IRST)

Fajr (Persian: فجر) is a village in, and the capital of, Fajr Rural District in the Central District of Gonbad-e Kavus County, Golestan province, Iran.

== Demographics ==
=== Population ===
At the time of the 2006 National Census, the village's population was 1,319 in 288 households. The following census in 2011 counted 1,649 people in 405 households. The 2016 census measured the population of the village as 1,792 people in 464 households.
