= Sarli-ye Sofla =

Village in Golestan province, Iran

Sarli-ye Sofla Persian: سارلي سفلي
- Village
- Location within Iran
- Coordinates: 37°11′08″N 55°16′19″E
- Country: Iran
- Province: Golestan
- County: Gonbad-e Kavus
- District: Central
- Rural District: Fajr

Population (2016)
  - Total: 1,760
- Time zone: UTC+3:30 (IRST)

Sarli-ye Sofla (Persian: سارلي سفلي) (Note: Also romanized as Sārlī Soflá and Sārlī-ye Soflá; also known as Sārlī-ye Pā’īn) is a village in Fajr Rural District of the Central District in Gonbad-e Kavus County, Golestan province, Iran.

== Demographics ==
=== Population ===
At the time of the 2006 National Census, the village's population was 1,459 in 332 households. The following census in 2011 counted 1,698 people in 463 households. The 2016 census measured the population of the village as 1,760 people in 476 households.
