= Faruj =

City in North Khorasan province, Iran

Faruj فاروج
- City
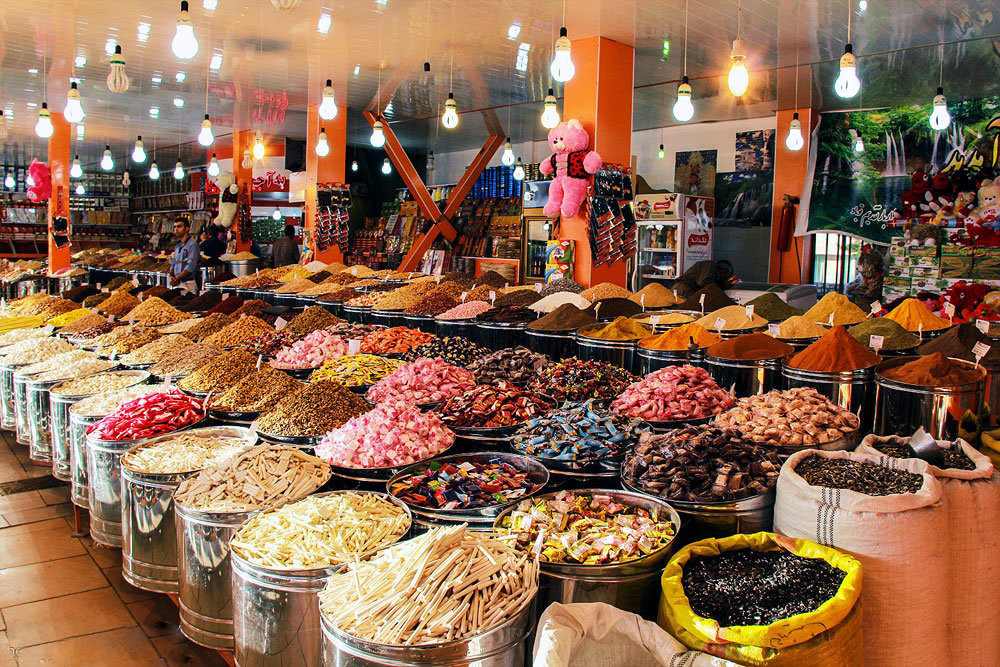

- Location within Iran
- Coordinates: 37°13′56″N 58°13′10″E
- Country: Iran
- Province: North Khorasan
- County: Faruj
- District: Central

Population (2016)
  - Total: 12,061
- Time zone: UTC+3:30 (IRST)

Faruj (Persian: فاروج) (Note: Also romanized as Fārūj; also known as Fārij) is a city in the Central District of Faruj County, North Khorasan province, Iran, serving as capital of both the county and the district. Faruj is between the cities of Quchan and Shirvan in the west of the province.

== History ==
The city was formerly called Farajabad. It is said that about 1200 years ago, during the time of Harun al-Rasheed, Faruj was built by a person named Farjullah.

== Demographics ==
=== Language ===
The main language of Faruj is Persian; Turkish Khorasani and Kurdish are also spoken in Kermanji. The Faruj Turks are from the Mehani tribe, and the Kurds from the Zafranlu tribe.

=== Population ===
At the 2006 National Census, the city's population was 10,039 in 2,639 households. At the following census in 2011 the population was 11,731 people in 3,195 households. The 2016 census counted 12,061 people in 3,541 households.

== Geography ==
=== Location ===
Faruj County is bordered by Quchan County to the east, Turkmenistan to the north, Esfarayen County to the south, and Shirvan County to the west.

== Agriculture ==
One of the best factors in attracting tourists and travelers to Faruj is the presence of various nuts and foods in this region. The existence of the Road 22 (Iran) and its passage through the city center caused the city of Faruj to be named as the capital of nuts and dried fruits of Iran since 2010.

Today, with a good amount of saffron production in Faruj, there is a capacity to provide more grounds for the development of the city by turning Faruj saffron into a national and even global brand. Currently, most of the production of saffron and other nuts is exported to Mashhad for sale to tourists. With the arrival of processing and packaging companies in the city in recent years, fortunately, great job opportunities are provided for the people of this city.
