= Qalandarabad-e Bala =

Village in Golestan province, Iran

Qalandarabad-e Bala Persian: قلندرابادبالا
- Village
- Location within Iran
- Coordinates: 37°13′52″N 55°07′35″E
- Country: Iran
- Province: Golestan
- County: Gonbad-e Kavus
- District: Central
- Rural District: Soltanali

Population (2016)
  - Total: 2,185
- Time zone: UTC+3:30 (IRST)

Qalandarabad-e Bala (Persian: قلندرابادبالا) (Note: Also romanized as Qalandarābād-e Bālā; also known as Qalandarābād) is a village in Soltanali Rural District of the Central District in Gonbad-e Kavus County, Golestan province, Iran.

== Demographics ==
=== Population ===
At the time of the 2006 National Census, the village's population was 992 in 197 households. The following census in 2011 counted 1,186 people in 279 households. The 2016 census measured the population of the village as 2,185 people in 562 households.
