= Guzoni Tappeh-ye Bala =

Village in Golestan province, Iran

Guzoni Tappeh-ye Bala Persian: گوزني تپه بالا
- Village
- Location within Iran
- Coordinates: 37°20′07″N 55°09′13″E
- Country: Iran
- Province: Golestan
- County: Gonbad-e Kavus
- District: Central
- Rural District: Aqabad

Population (2016)
  - Total: 154
- Time zone: UTC+3:30 (IRST)

Guzoni Tappeh-ye Bala (Persian: گوزني تپه بالا) (Note: Also romanized as Gūzonī Tappeh-ye Bālā) is a village in Aqabad Rural District of the Central District in Gonbad-e Kavus County, Golestan province, Iran.

== Demographics ==
=== Population ===
At the time of the 2006 National Census, the village's population was 106 in 19 households. The following census in 2011 counted 113 people in 22 households. The 2016 census measured the population of the village as 154 people in 34 households.
