= Hivehchi-ye Bala =

Village in Golestan province, Iran

Hivehchi-ye Bala Persian: هيوه چي بالا
- Village
- Location within Iran
- Coordinates: 37°08′59″N 55°04′07″E
- Country: Iran
- Province: Golestan
- County: Gonbad-e Kavus
- District: Central
- Rural District: Bagheli-ye Marama

Population (2016)
  - Total: 1,983
- Time zone: UTC+3:30 (IRST)

Hivehchi-ye Bala (Persian: هيوه چي بالا) (Note: Also romanized as Hīvehchī-e Bālā; also known as Hīvehchī) is a village in Bagheli-ye Marama Rural District of the Central District in Gonbad-e Kavus County, Golestan province, Iran.

== Demographics ==
=== Population ===
At the time of the 2006 National Census, the village's population was 2,076 in 455 households. The following census in 2011 counted 2,005 people in 569 households. The 2016 census measured the population of the village as 1,983 people in 578 households.
