= Guzzoni =

Guzzoni is a surname of Italian origin. People with that name include:

- Alfredo Guzzoni (1877–1965), Italian military officer who served in both World War I and World War II
- Didier Guzzoni (born 1970), Swiss computer scientist and inventor of Siri
- Tommaso Guzzoni (1632–1704), Roman Catholic prelate who served as Bishop of Sora

== See also ==
- Guzoni (disambiguation)
