= Buanlu =

Village in North Khorasan province, Iran

Buanlu Persian: بوانلو
- Village
- Location within Iran
- Coordinates: 37°32′44″N 58°11′04″E
- Country: Iran
- Province: North Khorasan
- County: Shirvan
- District: Central
- Rural District: Sivkanlu

Population (2016)
  - Total: 484
- Time zone: UTC+3:30 (IRST)

Buanlu (Persian: بوانلو) (Note: Also romanized as Bavānlū and Būānlū) is a village in Sivkanlu Rural District of the Central District in Shirvan County, North Khorasan province, Iran.

== Demographics ==
=== Population ===
At the time of the 2006 National Census, the village's population was 818 in 204 households. The following census in 2011 counted 597 people in 172 households. The 2016 census measured the population of the village as 484 people in 157 households.
