= Chay Qushan-e Kuchek =

Village in Golestan province, Iran

Chay Qushan-e Kuchek Persian: چاي قوشان كوچك
- Village
- Location within Iran
- Coordinates: 37°23′25″N 55°20′49″E
- Country: Iran
- Province: Golestan
- County: Gonbad-e Kavus
- District: Central
- Rural District: Aqabad

Population (2016)
  - Total: 1,094
- Time zone: UTC+3:30 (IRST)

Chay Qushan-e Kuchek (Persian: چاي قوشان كوچك) (Note: Also romanized as Chāy Qūshan Kūchak, Chāy Qūshan Kūchek, and Chāy Qūshan-e Kūchek) is a village in Aqabad Rural District of the Central District in Gonbad-e Kavus County, Golestan province, Iran.

== Demographics ==
=== Population ===
At the time of the 2006 National Census, the village's population was 967 in 215 households. The following census in 2011 counted 981 people in 265 households. The 2016 census measured the population of the village as 1,094 people in 284 households.
