= Imer Molla Sari =

Village in Golestan province, Iran

Imer Molla Sari Persian: ايمرملاساري
- Village
- Location within Iran
- Coordinates: 37°07′34″N 54°51′29″E
- Country: Iran
- Province: Golestan
- County: Gonbad-e Kavus
- District: Central
- Rural District: Bagheli-ye Marama

Population (2016)
  - Total: 3,101
- Time zone: UTC+3:30 (IRST)

Imer Molla Sari (Persian: ايمرملاساري) (Note: Also romanized as Eymar Mollā Sārī and Īmer Mollā Sārī; also known as Eymar and Yamar Mollā Sārī) is a village in Bagheli-ye Marama Rural District of the Central District in Gonbad-e Kavus County, Golestan province, Iran.

== Demographics ==
=== Population ===
At the time of the 2006 National Census, the village's population was 2,418 in 546 households. The following census in 2011 counted 3,022 people in 755 households. The 2016 census measured the population of the village as 3,101 people in 792 households.
