= Qaleh Cheh, North Khorasan =

Village in North Khorasan province, Iran

Qaleh Cheh Persian: قلعه چه
- Village
- Location within Iran
- Coordinates: 37°28′46″N 58°00′28″E
- Country: Iran
- Province: North Khorasan
- County: Shirvan
- District: Central
- Rural District: Sivkanlu

Population (2016)
  - Total: 434
- Time zone: UTC+3:30 (IRST)

Qaleh Cheh (Persian: قلعه چه) (Note: Also romanized as Qal‘eh Cheh) is a village in Sivkanlu Rural District of the Central District in Shirvan County, North Khorasan province, Iran.

== Demographics ==
=== Population ===
At the time of the 2006 National Census, the village's population was 576 in 140 households. The following census in 2011 counted 510 people in 144 households. The 2016 census measured the population of the village as 434 people in 130 households.
