= Shokranlu, Sivkanlu =

Shokranlu شكرانلو
- Village
- Location within Iran
- Coordinates: 37°29′02″N 58°11′54″E
- Country: Iran
- Province: North Khorasan
- County: Shirvan
- Bakhsh: Central
- Rural District: Sivkanlu

Population (2006)
  - Total: 74
- Time zone: UTC+3:30 (IRST)
  - Summer (DST): UTC+4:30 (IRDT)

Shokranlu (Persian: شكرانلو, also Romanized as Shokrānlū; also known as Shokrānlū-ye Bālā and Shokrānlū Bālā) is a village in Sivkanlu Rural District, in the Central District of Shirvan County, North Khorasan Province, Iran. At the 2006 census, its population was 74, in 19 families.
