= Igder-e Olya =

Village in Golestan province, Iran

Igder-e Olya Persian: ايگدرعليا
- Village
- Location within Iran
- Coordinates: 37°15′33″N 55°19′00″E
- Country: Iran
- Province: Golestan
- County: Gonbad-e Kavus
- District: Central
- Rural District: Fajr

Population (2016)
  - Total: 1,685
- Time zone: UTC+3:30 (IRST)

Igder-e Olya (Persian: ايگدرعليا) (Note: Also romanized as Īgder-e ‘Olyā; also known as Īgder-e Bālā and Īgūr-e Bālā) is a village in Fajr Rural District of the Central District in Gonbad-e Kavus County, Golestan province, Iran.

== Demographics ==
=== Population ===
At the time of the 2006 National Census, the village's population was 1,391 in 269 households. The following census in 2011 counted 1,566 people in 376 households. The 2016 census measured the population of the village as 1,685 people in 466 households.
