= Hossein Afarideh =

Iranian scientist and politician

Hossein Afarideh is an Iranian physicist and member of parliament.

Afarideh was born in Shirvan, Iran in 1954. He studied the school period in Shirvan and was accepted in Tehran University in Physics field. He passed the exams with high mark and got the first grade. He was accepted by Birmingham University. He got his Ph.D. in 1988. He was Shirvan's representative in 6th and 7th period. He was a member of the Energy Committee in Iran's Parliament. now he is a faculty member of Amirkabir university and is Head of Department of Energy Engineering and Physics Prof. at Amirkabir University of Technology.
