= Dashli-ye Olya =

Village in Golestan province, Iran

Dashli-ye Olya Persian: داشلي عليا
- Village
- Location within Iran
- Coordinates: 37°14′09″N 55°04′47″E
- Country: Iran
- Province: Golestan
- County: Gonbad-e Kavus
- District: Central
- Rural District: Soltanali

Population (2016)
  - Total: 909
- Time zone: UTC+3:30 (IRST)

Dashli-ye Olya (Persian: داشلي عليا) (Note: Also romanized as Dāshlī-ye ‘Olyā; also known as Dāshlī-ye Bālā) is a village in Soltanali Rural District of the Central District in Gonbad-e Kavus County, Golestan province, Iran.

== Demographics ==
=== Population ===
At the time of the 2006 National Census, the village's population was 727 in 141 households. The following census in 2011 counted 812 people in 206 households. The 2016 census measured the population of the village as 909 people in 245 households.
