= Hivehchi-ye Markazi =

Village in Golestan province, Iran

Hivehchi-ye Markazi Persian: هيوه چي مركزي
- Village
- Location within Iran
- Coordinates: 37°09′33″N 55°03′51″E
- Country: Iran
- Province: Golestan
- County: Gonbad-e Kavus
- District: Central
- Rural District: Bagheli-ye Marama

Population (2016)
  - Total: 1,087
- Time zone: UTC+3:30 (IRST)

Hivehchi-ye Markazi (Persian: هيوه چي مركزي) (Note: Also romanized as Hīvehchī-ye Marḵazī) is a village in Bagheli-ye Marama Rural District of the Central District in Gonbad-e Kavus County, Golestan province, Iran.

== Demographics ==
=== Population ===
At the time of the 2006 National Census, the village's population was 979 in 202 households. The following census in 2011 counted 1,050 people in 278 households. The 2016 census measured the population of the village as 1,087 people in 298 households.
