= Shirvan, Iran =

City in North Khorasan province, Iran

Shirvan Persian: شیروان
- City
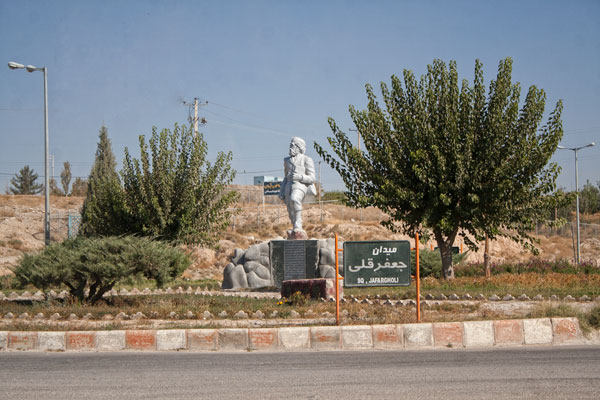
- A square in Shirvan

- Location within Iran
- Coordinates: 37°24′07″N 57°55′41″E
- Country: Iran
- Province: North Khorasan
- County: Shirvan
- District: Central

Population (2016)
  - Total: 82,689
- Time zone: UTC+3:30 (IRST)

Shirvan (Persian: شیروان) (Note: Also romanized as Shīrvān) is a city in the Central District of Shirvan County, North Khorasan province, Iran, serving as capital of both the county and the district. The city has been significant industrially with sugar beet factories. It is also significant historically (Nader hill), geographically (Honameh), and anthropologically (caves around the city).

== Etymology ==
The name of the city stems from the old Persian word, shīr (شیر), "lion." It might be because of the mountain in the south of the city which looks like a big lion at rest. The history of Shirvan is more than 7000 years old, as archaeologists found some graves in Gelian and Khanlogh (Villages of Shirvan) which are related to Achaemenid Empire era. The city was fortified and strengthened as a fort city during the Safavid era to defend it against the raiding Turkmens.

== Demographics ==
=== Population ===
At the time of the 2006 National Census, the city's population was 82,790 in 20,878 households. The following census in 2011 counted 88,254 people in 24,353 households. The 2016 census measured the population of the city as 82,689 people in 24,760 households.

== Geography ==
Shirvan is located at an latitude of 37 degrees and 40 minutes and a longitude of 57 degrees and 93 minutes with an altitude of 1097 meters above sea level and an area of 3789 square meters. The city of Ashgabat is bounded on the north by the capital of Turkmenistan, on the south by the city of Esfarayen, on the east by the city of Farooj and on the west by Bojnourd. The city of Shirvan is near the Atrak River. Shirvan, 22 km away, is the closest city to Ashgabat, the capital of Turkmenistan.

== Universities ==
Shirvan Higher Education Complex

Shirvan Health Higher Education Complex

Islamic Azad University, Shirvan Branch

Professor Hesabi Boys' Technical School

== See also ==
- Ban Shirvan
- Bi Bi Shirvan
- Karkhaneh-ye Qand-e Shirvan
- Shirvan
