= Igder-e Sofla =

Village in Golestan province, Iran

Igder-e Sofla Persian: ايگدرسفلي
- Village
- Location within Iran
- Coordinates: 37°16′18″N 55°17′03″E
- Country: Iran
- Province: Golestan
- County: Gonbad-e Kavus
- District: Central
- Rural District: Fajr

Population (2016)
  - Total: 2,825
- Time zone: UTC+3:30 (IRST)

Igder-e Sofla (Persian: ايگدرسفلي) (Note: Also romanized as Īgder-e Soflá; also known as Īgder-e Pā’īn and Īgūr-e Pā’īn) is a village in Fajr Rural District of the Central District in Gonbad-e Kavus County, Golestan province, Iran.

== Demographics ==
=== Population ===
At the time of the 2006 National Census, the village's population was 2,318 in 487 households. The following census in 2011 counted 2,745 people in 657 households. The 2016 census measured the population of the village as 2,825 people in 793 households.
