= Chay Qushan-e Bozorg =

Village in Golestan province, Iran

Chay Qushan-e Bozorg Persian: چاي قوشان بزرگ
- Village
- Location within Iran
- Coordinates: 37°22′48″N 55°19′30″E
- Country: Iran
- Province: Golestan
- County: Gonbad-e Kavus
- District: Central
- Rural District: Aqabad

Population (2016)
  - Total: 3,219
- Time zone: UTC+3:30 (IRST)

Chay Qushan-e Bozorg (Persian: چاي قوشان بزرگ) (Note: Also romanized as Chāy Qūshan-e Bozorg) is a village in Aqabad Rural District of the Central District in Gonbad-e Kavus County, Golestan province, Iran.

== Demographics ==
=== Population ===
At the time of the 2006 National Census, the village's population was 2,680 in 516 households. The following census in 2011 counted 2,971 people in 755 households. The 2016 census measured the population of the village as 3,219 people in 860 households.
