= Pashmak Panadeh =

Village in Golestan province, Iran

Pashmak Panadeh Persian: پشمك پناده
- Village
- Location within Iran
- Coordinates: 37°13′46″N 55°14′57″E
- Country: Iran
- Province: Golestan
- County: Gonbad-e Kavus
- District: Central
- Rural District: Fajr

Population (2016)
  - Total: 2,413
- Time zone: UTC+3:30 (IRST)

Pashmak Panadeh (Persian: پشمك پناده) (Note: Also romanized as Pashmak Panādeh; also known as Pashmak and Pashmak Panāh Deh) is a village in Fajr Rural District of the Central District in Gonbad-e Kavus County, Golestan province, Iran.

== Demographics ==
=== Population ===
At the time of the 2006 National Census, the village's population was 1,954 in 414 households. The following census in 2011 counted 2,357 people in 570 households. The 2016 census measured the population of the village as 2,413 people in 682 households.
