= Qaleh Hasan, North Khorasan =

Village in North Khorasan province, Iran

Qaleh Hasan Persian: قلعه حسن
- Village
- Location within Iran
- Coordinates: 37°37′16″N 58°07′15″E
- Country: Iran
- Province: North Khorasan
- County: Shirvan
- District: Central
- Rural District: Sivkanlu

Population (2016)
  - Total: 663
- Time zone: UTC+3:30 (IRST)

Qaleh Hasan (Persian: قلعه حسن) (Note: Also romanized as Qal‘eh Ḩasan and Qal‘eh-ye Ḩasan; also known as Ḩasan and Ḩasan Qal‘eh) is a village in Sivkanlu Rural District of the Central District in Shirvan County, North Khorasan province, Iran.

== Demographics ==
=== Population ===
At the time of the 2006 National Census, the village's population was 423 in 100 households. The following census in 2011 counted 345 people in 85 households. The 2016 census measured the population of the village as 663 people in 183 households.
