= Alashlu =

Alashlu الاشلو
- Village
- Location within Iran
- Coordinates: 37°32′09″N 58°11′29″E
- Country: Iran
- Province: North Khorasan
- County: Shirvan
- Bakhsh: Central
- Rural District: Sivkanlu

Population (2006)
  - Total: 95
- Time zone: UTC+3:30 (IRST)
  - Summer (DST): UTC+4:30 (IRDT)

Alashlu (Persian: الاشلو, also Romanized as Ālāshlū and Olāshlū) is a village in Sivkanlu Rural District, in the Central District of Shirvan County, North Khorasan Province, Iran. At the 2006 census, its population was 95, in 25 families.
