= Qalandarabad-e Pain =

Village in Golestan province, Iran

Qalandarabad-e Pain Persian: قلندرابادپائين
- Village
- Location within Iran
- Coordinates: 37°14′23″N 55°07′51″E
- Country: Iran
- Province: Golestan
- County: Gonbad-e Kavus
- District: Central
- Rural District: Soltanali

Population (2016)
  - Total: 1,106
- Time zone: UTC+3:30 (IRST)

Qalandarabad-e Pain (Persian: قلندرابادپائين) (Note: Also romanized as Qalandarābād-e Pā’īn; also known as Qalandarābād) is a village in Soltanali Rural District of the Central District in Gonbad-e Kavus County, Golestan province, Iran.

== Demographics ==
=== Population ===
At the time of the 2006 National Census, the village's population was 747 in 148 households. The following census in 2011 counted 954 people in 235 households. The 2016 census measured the population of the village as 1,106 people in 302 households.
