= Sarli-ye Olya =

Village in Golestan province, Iran

Sarli-ye Olya Persian: سارلي عليا
- Village
- Location within Iran
- Coordinates: 37°13′00″N 55°13′45″E
- Country: Iran
- Province: Golestan
- County: Gonbad-e Kavus
- District: Central
- Rural District: Fajr

Population (2016)
  - Total: 1,479
- Time zone: UTC+3:30 (IRST)

Sarli-ye Olya (Persian: سارلي عليا) (Note: Also romanized as Sārlī ‘Olyā and Sārlī-ye ‘Olyā; also known as Sārlī-ye Bālā) is a village in Fajr Rural District of the Central District in Gonbad-e Kavus County, Golestan province, Iran.

== Demographics ==
=== Population ===
At the time of the 2006 National Census, the village's population was 1,250 in 324 households. The following census in 2011 counted 1,323 people in 334 households. The 2016 census measured the population of the village as 1,479 people in 391 households.
