= Aqabad Rural District =

Rural district in Golestan province, Iran

Aqabad Rural District Persian: دهستان آق آباد
- Rural District
- Location within Iran
- Coordinates: 37°25′N 55°11′E
- Country: Iran
- Province: Golestan
- County: Gonbad-e Kavus
- District: Central
- Established: 1987
- Capital: Aqabad

Population (2016)
  - Total: 36,886
- Time zone: UTC+3:30 (IRST)

Aqabad Rural District (Persian: دهستان آق آباد) is in the Central District of Gonbad-e Kavus County, Golestan province, Iran. Its capital is the village of Aqabad.

== Demographics ==
=== Population ===
At the time of the 2006 National Census, the rural district's population was 29,707 in 5,931 households. There were 32,907 inhabitants in 8,132 households at the following census of 2011. The 2016 census measured the population of the rural district as 36,886 in 9,570 households. The most populous of its 28 villages was Aqabad, with 5,534 people.

=== Other villages in the rural district ===
- Abadan Tappeh
- Aman Gol Tappeh
- Aman Qarahjeh
- Arab Sorang
- Atalar
- Avaz Hajji
- Buin-e Owzin Qajaq
- Chapar Quymeh
- Chay Qushan-e Bozorg
- Chay Qushan-e Kuchek
- Chokor Ata
- Egri Bughaz
- Gharavelar
- Guzoni Tappeh
- Guzoni Tappeh-ye Bala
- Hajji Qushan
- Ishanlar
- Kaskan Qajaq
- Malek Ali Tappeh
- Molla Ali Tappeh
- Qarah Mohammad Tappeh
- Sarli Makhtum
- Seyyed Niyaz
- Shahrak-e Golestan Emam Khomeyni
- Tekehlar
- Tutli-ye Kuchek
