= Gonbad-e Kavus =

City in Golestan Province, Iran

Gonbad-e Kavus Persian: گنبد قابوس
- City
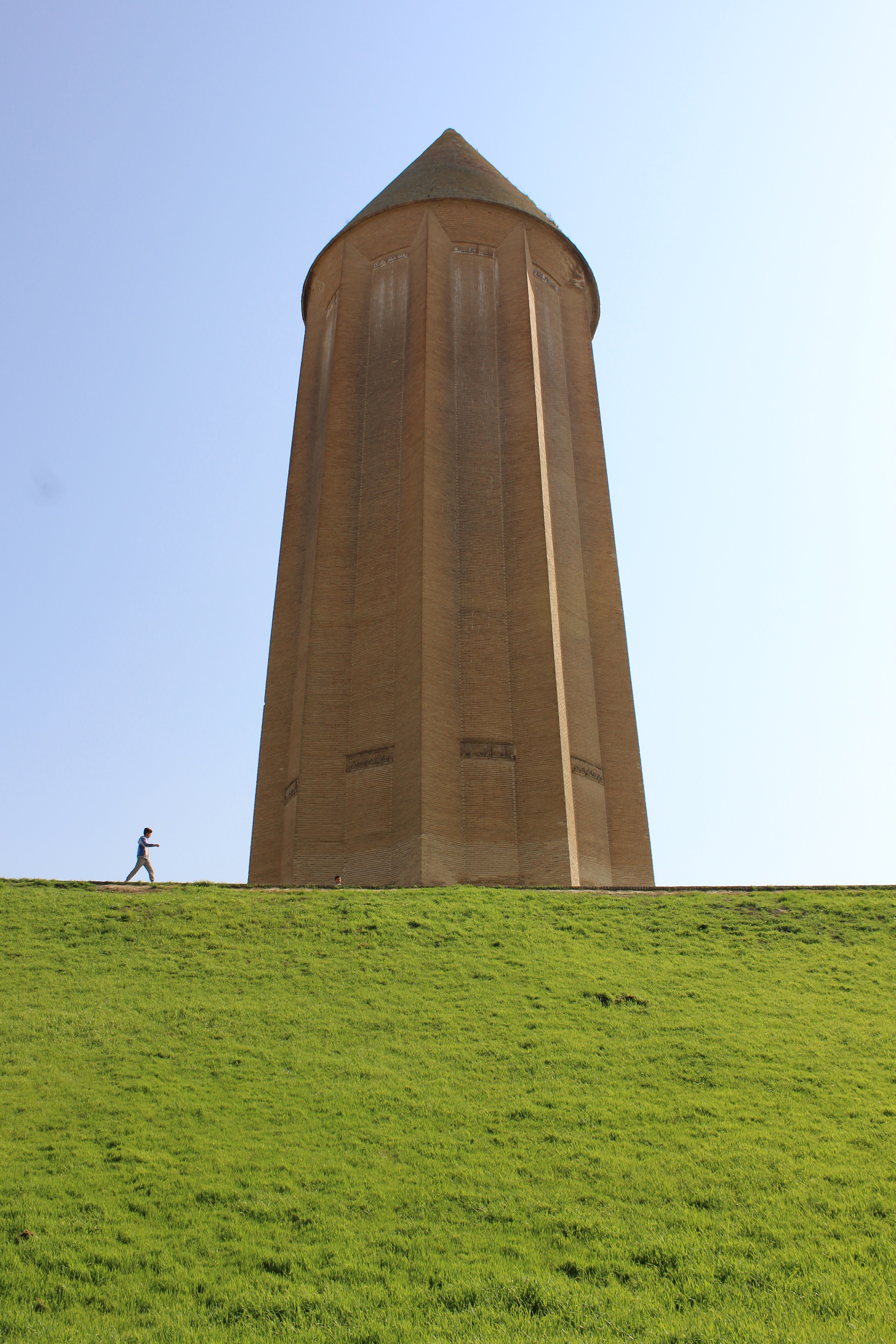
- The historical tower of Gonbad-e Qabus

- Location within Iran
- Coordinates: 37°14′37″N 55°09′57″E
- Country: Iran
- Province: Golestan
- County: Gonbad-e Kavus
- District: Central

Population (2016)
  - Total: 151,910
- Time zone: UTC+3:30 (IRST)
- Website: gonbadcity.ir

Gonbad-e Kabus (Persian: گنبد قابوس) (Note: Also romanized as Gonbade Kâvus, Gonbæde Kavus, Gonbad-e Kāvus, Gonbad-e Kāvūs, Gonbad-i Kāvoos, and Gonbadekavoos; also known as Gonbad Qābūs, Gonbad Qavoos, Gunbad-i-Kāvūs, Gunbad-i-Kāwās, Gunbad-i-Kāwūs, and Günbədkavus) is a city in the Central District of Gonbad-e Kavus County, Golestan province, Iran, serving as capital of both the county and the district.

The modern name is a reference to an imposing ancient tower, the Tomb of Qabus. The monument itself was assigned to the neighboring historical city of Astarabad in the 1930s by the Iranian government. The city has also been known by the name Dasht-e Gorgan, meaning "the Plains of Gorgan".

In the historical times, the city's populations were made up of various Iranic peoples such as the ancient and eponymous Hyrcanians, Parthians and eventually the Khurasani Persians.

Today, however, the population is a mix of Turkmens, Iranian Azerbaijanis, Sistanis, Baluch, Semnanis, and Khorasanis. The Persians and Iranian Azeris tend to mainly follow Shia Islam while the Turkmens are mostly Sunni Muslim.

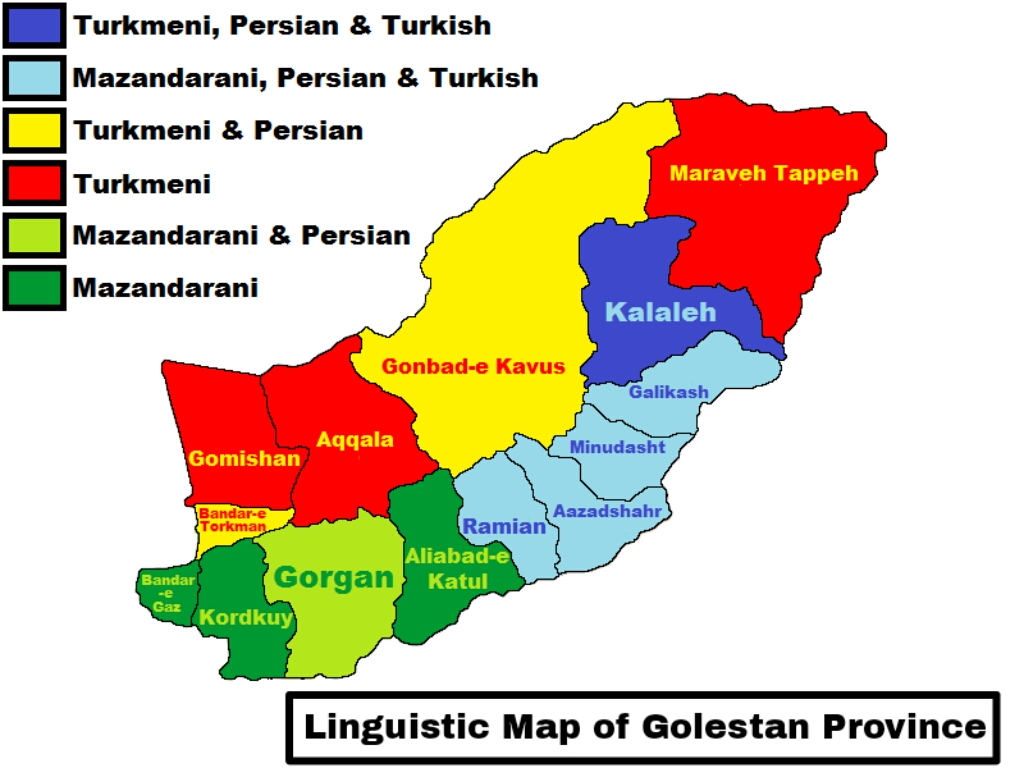
Linguistic Map of Golestan province

== Demographics ==
=== Population ===
At the time of the 2006 National Census, the city's population was 127,167 in 30,710 households. The following census in 2011 counted 144,546 people in 39,181 households. The 2016 census measured the population of the city as 151,910 people in 44,731 households.

== Historical attractions ==
The "Divar-e Gorgan" (Persian for "The Great Wall of Gorgan") is a gigantic defensive wall built in the Sasanian period of Iranian history. The visible remains are about 155 km (96 mi) long and 6–10 m (20–33 ft) wide. It is one of the most outstanding and gigantic architectural monuments in northeast Iran and the most impressive in the Golestan Province. This wall, which is the largest defensive wall in the world after the Great Wall of China, starts from the Caspian sea coast, circles north of the city of Gonbad-e Kāvus, continues towards the northeast, and vanishes into the Pishkamar Mountains.

At certain points, the Divar is 6 m (20 ft) wide and in other parts the width is 10 m (33 ft), depending on the nature of the land and the soil type. Watch towers and forts had been built at varying distances. The longest distance between forts is 50 km (31 mi) and the shortest is 10 km (6.2 mi). The 40 identified forts vary in dimension and shape but the majority are square fortresses. Due to many difficulties in development and agricultural projects, archaeologists have been assigned to mark the boundary of the historical find by laying cement blocks.

The Divar defensive wall has also been known variously as Alexander Dam, Anushirvân Dam, Firuz Dam and Golestan's Defense Wall in various historical texts.

Dr. Kiani, who led the archaeological team in 1971, believes that the wall was built during the Parthian dynasty, simultaneously with the construction of the Great Wall of China, and that it was restored during the Sassanid era (3rd to 7th centuries AD).

== Neolithic period ==
During the Neolithic period, this area had many populated settlements. For example, Yarim Tepe (Iran). The Jeitun culture started before 6000 BC.

== Climate ==
Gonbad-e Kavus has a hot semi-arid climate (BSh) according to the Köppen climate classification.

Climate data for Gonbad-e Kavus (1995-2010 normals)
Month	Jan	Feb	Mar	Apr	May	Jun	Jul	Aug	Sep	Oct	Nov	Dec	Year
Mean daily maximum °C (°F)	12.9 (55.2)	14.4 (57.9)	16.4 (61.5)	22.4 (72.3)	28.7 (83.7)	33.6 (92.5)	35.2 (95.4)	36.0 (96.8)	32.2 (90.0)	26.8 (80.2)	19.6 (67.3)	15.4 (59.7)	24.5 (76.0)
Daily mean °C (°F)	8.1 (46.6)	9.2 (48.6)	11.2 (52.2)	16.5 (61.7)	21.8 (71.2)	26.7 (80.1)	29.2 (84.6)	29.9 (85.8)	26.1 (79.0)	20.4 (68.7)	14.0 (57.2)	10.2 (50.4)	18.6 (65.5)
Average precipitation mm (inches)	49.2 (1.94)	40.0 (1.57)	62.9 (2.48)	51.7 (2.04)	27.5 (1.08)	16.1 (0.63)	21.6 (0.85)	27.1 (1.07)	30.0 (1.18)	40.3 (1.59)	48.9 (1.93)	40.9 (1.61)	456.2 (17.97)
Source: Iran Meteorological Organization

== Natural attractions ==
- Aji gol Lake
- Ala gol lake
- Alma Gol Lake
- Chehelchay Forest
- Golestan Forest
- Gonbad Horse Racing Center

== Colleges and universities ==
- Gonbad Kavous University
- Islamic Azad University of Gonbad
- Payamnoor University of Gonbad

== Notable people ==
- Sardar Azmoun
- Farhad Ghaemi
- Parham Maghsoodloo
- Magtymguly Pyragy
- Shahpour Turkian
- Mohsen Yeganeh

== See also ==
- Kay Kāvus
- Decagon
- Iranian Turkmen
- Iranian Art Museum Garden, which includes a replica of the Gonbad-e Kavus tower.
