= Kurkanlu-ye Sofla =

Village in North Khorasan province, Iran

Kurkanlu-ye Sofla Persian: كوركانلوسفلي
- Village
- Location within Iran
- Coordinates: 37°37′13″N 58°00′37″E
- Country: Iran
- Province: North Khorasan
- County: Shirvan
- District: Central
- Rural District: Sivkanlu

Population (2016)
  - Total: 311
- Time zone: UTC+3:30 (IRST)

Kurkanlu-ye Sofla (Persian: كوركانلوسفلي) (Note: Also romanized as Kūrkānlū-e Soflá; also known as Kūrkānlū and Kūrkānlū-ye Pā’īn) is a village in Sivkanlu Rural District of the Central District in Shirvan County, North Khorasan province, Iran.

== Demographics ==
=== Population ===
At the time of the 2006 National Census, the village's population was 196 in 41 households. The following census in 2011 counted 160 people in 42 households. The 2016 census measured the population of the village as 311 people in 94 households.
