= Alma Gol Lake =

Freshwater lake in Golestān Province, Iran

Alma Gol Lagoon
- Location within Iran
- Interactive map of Alma Gol Lagoon
- Location: Golestān Province
- Coordinates: 37°21′00″N 54°34′59″E
- Basin countries: Iran
- Surface area: 250 ha (620 acres)
- Max. depth: 4 m (13 ft)

Ramsar Wetland
- Official name: Alagol, Ulmagol and Ajigol Lakes
- Designated: 23 June 1975
- Reference no.: 49

Alma Gol Lake (Persian: دریاچه آلماگل), also called Lake Ulmagol, is a freshwater lake in Golestān Province, Iran near the Turkmenistan border.

The lake is located 60 kilometres (37 mi) north of Gonbad-e Qabus. The population of catfish (Silurus glanis) in the lake has drastically decreased because of increasing population growth among the villagers.

Alma Gol is a winter habitat for migratory birds. In 1975, the Alma Gol Lake and nearby Ala Gol and Aji Gol Lakes were designated as a wetland of international importance under the Ramsar Convention.

== Vegetation ==
About 80% of the vegetation in Alma Gol wetland is scattered in its eastern and northeastern parts, and various types of aquatic plants can be seen in this wetland. Among these plants, we can mention yarrow, jagan, Phragmites australis, blue fork, Polygonum, Batrachium and Bulrush. Another use of these plants is to prevent land erosion during floods. The most important of these types of plants are: salt grass, Turkmen broom, horsetail, Alhagi maurorum, Avena fatua, grass.

== Animales ==
There are many types of fish in this lagoon. For example: Caspian barbel, Capoeta, Carassius gibelio, Grass carp, Common Carp, Oarfish ,Caspian roac, Wels catfish ,Gambusia and Goby are some of the water pests of this lake. Among Of these, Carassius gibelio ,Oarfish, Grass carp ,Common Carp and gambusia are non-native and imported fresh water fish.

The most important migratory birds in the water and near the water of Almagol are "black-necked kashm, cormorant , gray heron, egret, black-headed duck, black-crested duck ,crested duck, white-headed duck, khotka,, changar ,woodpecker, gypsy rooster, small hen ,waterfowl, cockatoo, Goi Ganges, white-fronted cave and white-tailed sea eagle.
