= Bagheli-ye Marama Rural District =

Rural district in Golestan province, Iran

Bagheli-ye Marama Rural District Persian: دهستان باغلي ماراما
- Rural District
- Location within Iran
- Coordinates: 37°11′N 54°56′E
- Country: Iran
- Province: Golestan
- County: Gonbad-e Kavus
- District: Central
- Established: 1987
- Capital: Bagheli-ye Marama

Population (2016)
  - Total: 35,771
- Time zone: UTC+3:30 (IRST)

Bagheli-ye Marama Rural District (Persian: دهستان باغلي ماراما) is in the Central District of Gonbad-e Kavus County, Golestan province, Iran. Its capital is the village of Bagheli-ye Marama.

== Demographics ==
=== Population ===
At the time of the 2006 National Census, the rural district's population was 33,148 in 7,179 households. There were 34,077 inhabitants in 8,619 households at the following census of 2011. The 2016 census measured the population of the rural district as 35,771 in 9,643 households. The most populous of its 45 villages was Bi Bi Shirvan, with 4,199 people.

=== Other villages in the rural district ===
- Baluch Imer Mohammad
- Hadiabad
- Hivehchi-ye Bala
- Hivehchi-ye Markazi
- Imer Molla Sari
- Imer Tureh Molla
- Kaka
- Kuchek Dig Said
- Kuchek Khortum
- Mehdiabad
- Mohammad Imer
- Quch Morad
- Salaq-e Aman Kharlar
- Salaq-e Ghayib
- Salaq-e Yasi Tappeh
- Shahrak-e Beheshti
- Tappeh Nurjan
- Taqanpay-e Patakeh
- Tuqalajiq Tappeh
- Yarti Qayah
