= Guzoni Tappeh =

Village in Golestan province, Iran

Guzoni Tappeh Persian: گوزني تپه
- Village
- Location within Iran
- Coordinates: 37°19′44″N 55°09′06″E
- Country: Iran
- Province: Golestan
- County: Gonbad-e Kavus
- District: Central
- Rural District: Aqabad

Population (2016)
  - Total: 315
- Time zone: UTC+3:30 (IRST)

Guzoni Tappeh (Persian: گوزني تپه) (Note: Also romanized as Gūzonī Tappeh) is a village in Aqabad Rural District of the Central District in Gonbad-e Kavus County, Golestan province, Iran.

== Demographics ==
=== Population ===
At the time of the 2006 National Census, the village's population was 290 in 65 households. The subsequent census in 2011 counted 260 people in 72 households. The 2016 census recorded the population of the village as 315 people in 80 households.
