= Owghaz Kohneh =

Village in North Khorasan province, Iran

Owghaz Kohneh Persian: اوغاز كهنه
- Village
- Location within Iran
- Coordinates: 37°31′30″N 58°13′57″E
- Country: Iran
- Province: North Khorasan
- County: Shirvan
- District: Central
- Rural District: Sivkanlu

Population (2016)
  - Total: 518
- Time zone: UTC+3:30 (IRST)

Owghaz Kohneh (Persian: اوغاز كهنه) (Note: Also romanized as Owghāz Kohneh; also known as Kohneh Aghāz, Kohneh Owghāz (كهنه اوغاز), and Owghāz) is a village in Sivkanlu Rural District of the Central District in Shirvan County, North Khorasan province, Iran.

== Demographics ==
=== Population ===
At the time of the 2006 National Census, the village's population was 634 in 173 households. The following census in 2011 counted 666 people in 218 households. The 2016 census measured the population of the village as 518 people in 192 households.
