= Qezeljeh-ye Arshad =

Qezeljeh-ye Arshad قزلجه ارشد
- Village
- Location within Iran
- Coordinates: 37°01′29″N 47°04′35″E
- Country: Iran
- Province: East Azerbaijan
- County: Charuymaq
- Bakhsh: Shadian
- Rural District: Charuymaq-e Jonubesharqi

Population (2006)
  - Total: 98
- Time zone: UTC+3:30 (IRST)
  - Summer (DST): UTC+4:30 (IRDT)

Qezeljeh-ye Arshad (Persian: قزلجه ارشد) is a village in Charuymaq-e Jonubesharqi Rural District, Shadian District, Charuymaq County, East Azerbaijan Province, Iran. At the 2006 census, its population was 98, in 19 families.
