= Qezeljeh, Kurdistan =

Qezeljeh قزلجه
- Village
- Location within Iran
- Coordinates: 36°18′12″N 47°25′07″E
- Country: Iran
- Province: Kurdistan
- County: Bijar
- Bakhsh: Korani
- Rural District: Taghamin

Population (2006)
  - Total: 200
- Time zone: UTC+3:30 (IRST)
  - Summer (DST): UTC+4:30 (IRDT)

Qezeljeh (Persian: قزلجه; also known as Qerelījeh) is a village in Taghamin Rural District, Korani District, Bijar County, Kurdistan Province, Iran. At the 2006 census, its population was 200, in 44 families. The village is populated by Azerbaijanis.
