= Qezeljeh-ye Qomeshlu =

Qezeljeh-ye Qomeshlu قزلجه قمشلو
- Village
- Location within Iran
- Coordinates: 37°08′57″N 46°52′07″E
- Country: Iran
- Province: East Azerbaijan
- County: Charuymaq
- Bakhsh: Central
- Rural District: Charuymaq-e Markazi

Population (2006)
  - Total: 123
- Time zone: UTC+3:30 (IRST)
  - Summer (DST): UTC+4:30 (IRDT)

Qezeljeh-ye Qomeshlu (Persian: قزلجه قمشلو, also Romanized as Qezeljeh-ye Qomeshlū; also known as Qezeljeh) is a village in Charuymaq-e Markazi Rural District, in the Central District of Charuymaq County, East Azerbaijan Province, Iran. At the 2006 census, its population was 123, in 24 families.
