= Qezeljeh-ye Qeshlaq =

Qezeljeh-ye Qeshlaq قزلجه قشلاق
- Village
- Location within Iran
- Coordinates: 37°11′01″N 47°21′33″E
- Country: Iran
- Province: East Azerbaijan
- County: Charuymaq
- Bakhsh: Shadian
- Rural District: Charuymaq-e Sharqi

Population (2006)
  - Total: 158
- Time zone: UTC+3:30 (IRST)
  - Summer (DST): UTC+4:30 (IRDT)

Qezeljeh-ye Qeshlaq (Persian: قزلجه قشلاق, also Romanized as Qezeljeh-ye Qeshlāq) is a village in Charuymaq-e Sharqi Rural District, Shadian District, Charuymaq County, East Azerbaijan Province, Iran. At the 2006 census, its population was 158, in 31 families.
