= Chay Qushan, Ardabil =

Chay Qushan
- Location in Iran
- Coordinates: 37°19′17″N 48°24′30″E
- Country: Iran
- Province: Ardabil Province
- Time zone: UTC+3:30 (IRST)
  - Summer (DST): UTC+4:30 (IRDT)

Chay Qushan is a village in the Ardabil Province of Iran.
