= Qalandarabad, Roshtkhar =

Qalandarabad قلندراباد
- Village
- Location within Iran
- Coordinates: 35°00′35″N 59°30′43″E
- Country: Iran
- Province: Razavi Khorasan
- County: Roshtkhar
- Bakhsh: Central
- Rural District: Roshtkhar

Population (2006)
  - Total: 214
- Time zone: UTC+3:30 (IRST)
  - Summer (DST): UTC+4:30 (IRDT)

Qalandarabad (Persian: قلندراباد, also Romanized as Qalandarābād) is a village in Roshtkhar Rural District, in the Central District of Roshtkhar County, Razavi Khorasan Province, Iran. At the 2006 census, its population was 214, in 59 families.
