= Qezeljeh, Khoy =

Qezeljeh قزلجه
- Village
- Location within Iran
- Coordinates: 38°49′53″N 44°29′39″E
- Country: Iran
- Province: West Azerbaijan
- County: Khoy
- Bakhsh: Safayyeh
- Rural District: Sokmanabad

Population (2006)
  - Total: 465
- Time zone: UTC+3:30 (IRST)
  - Summer (DST): UTC+4:30 (IRDT)

Qezeljeh (Persian: قزلجه; also known as Qezeljeh Gol) is a village in Sokmanabad Rural District, Safayyeh District, Khoy County, West Azerbaijan Province, Iran. At the 2006 census, its population was 465, in 87 families.
