= Qaleh Beyg Qarah Cheshmeh =

Village in North Khorasan province, Iran

Qaleh Beyg Qarah Cheshmeh Persian: قلعه بيگ قره چشمه
- Village
- Location within Iran
- Coordinates: 37°36′22″N 58°08′19″E
- Country: Iran
- Province: North Khorasan
- County: Shirvan
- District: Central
- Rural District: Sivkanlu

Population (2016)
  - Total: 549
- Time zone: UTC+3:30 (IRST)

Qaleh Beyg Qarah Cheshmeh (Persian: قلعه بيگ قره چشمه) (Note: Also romanized as Qal‘eh Beyg Qarah Cheshmeh; also known as Beyg, Qal‘eh Beyg, and Qal‘eh Bīg) is a village in Sivkanlu Rural District of the Central District in Shirvan County, North Khorasan province, Iran.

== Demographics ==
=== Population ===
At the time of the 2006 National Census, the village's population was 435 in 112 households. The following census in 2011 counted 341 people in 94 households. The 2016 census measured the population of the village as 549 people in 160 households.

== Overview ==
The old village is north of the city of Shirvan, dating back more than 300 years, and its people speak Kurdish (Kermani). The population of this village is divided into three different clans, including: Kalajan, Shamalian and Thayan (Tayanlou).

Famous people of this village have been recorded in different periods of history. The most prominent person in the history of this village is Ismail Ghorbanian, who was one of the greatest commanders in the Nadir Shah's era, and was the only one in the Nadir Shah armies who never bowed to him. American historian Harold Lamb has mentioned this person in his book.
