= Soltanali Rural District =

Rural district in Golestan province, Iran

Soltanali Rural District Persian: دهستان سلطانعلي
- Rural District
- Location within Iran
- Coordinates: 37°19′N 54°59′E
- Country: Iran
- Province: Golestan
- County: Gonbad-e Kavus
- District: Central
- Established: 1993
- Capital: Soltanali

Population (2016)
  - Total: 43,404
- Time zone: UTC+3:30 (IRST)

Soltanali Rural District (Persian: دهستان سلطانعلي) is in the Central District of Gonbad-e Kavus County, Golestan province, Iran. Its capital is the village of Soltanali.

== Demographics ==
=== Population ===
At the time of the 2006 National Census, the rural district's population was 30,798 in 6,302 households. There were 38,638 inhabitants in 9,281 households at the following census of 2011. The 2016 census measured the population of the rural district as 43,404 in 11,398 households. The most populous of its 29 villages was Gadmabad, with 8,250 people.

=== Other villages in the rural district ===
- Aq Cheli-ye Sofla
- Aq Qayeh
- Armiabad
- Charvayolqi
- Dashli-ye Olya
- Dikcheh
- Hali Akhund
- Kurekli
- Nurabad
- Qalandarabad-e Bala
- Qalandarabad-e Pain
- Qazaqoli
- Qur Polcheh
- Sari Bakhsh
