= Qezeljeh-ye Sadat =

Qezeljeh-ye Sadat قزلجه سادات
- Village
- Location within Iran
- Coordinates: 38°06′06″N 47°18′00″E
- Country: Iran
- Province: East Azerbaijan
- County: Sarab
- Bakhsh: Mehraban
- Rural District: Alan Baraghush

Population (2006)
  - Total: 245
- Time zone: UTC+3:30 (IRST)
  - Summer (DST): UTC+4:30 (IRDT)

Qezeljeh-ye Sadat (Persian: قزلجه سادات, also Romanized as Qezeljeh-ye Sādāt; also known as Qezeljeh) is a village in Alan Baraghush Rural District, Mehraban District, Sarab County, East Azerbaijan Province, Iran. At the 2006 census, its population was 245, in 53 families.
