= Qezeljeh, Meyaneh =

Qezeljeh قزلجه
- Village
- Location within Iran
- Coordinates: 37°10′33″N 47°57′24″E
- Country: Iran
- Province: East Azerbaijan
- County: Meyaneh
- Bakhsh: Kaghazkonan
- Rural District: Kaghazkonan-e Markazi

Population (2006)
  - Total: 49
- Time zone: UTC+3:30 (IRST)
  - Summer (DST): UTC+4:30 (IRDT)

Qezeljeh (Persian: قزلجه) is a village in Kaghazkonan-e Markazi Rural District, Kaghazkonan District, Meyaneh County, East Azerbaijan Province, Iran. At the 2006 census, its population was 49, in 16 families.
