= Qowzlojeh =

Qowzlojeh قوزلجه
- Village
- Location within Iran
- Coordinates: 38°41′44″N 44°58′09″E
- Country: Iran
- Province: West Azerbaijan
- County: Khoy
- Bakhsh: Central
- Rural District: Dizaj

Population (2006)
  - Total: 97
- Time zone: UTC+3:30 (IRST)
  - Summer (DST): UTC+4:30 (IRDT)

Qowzlojeh (Persian: قوزلجه; also known as Ghoozloo Jeh, Qezeljah, Qezeljeh, Qezlu Jah, Qozluja, and Qozlu Jah) is a village in Dizaj Rural District, in the Central District of Khoy County, West Azerbaijan Province, Iran. At the 2006 census, its population was 97, with 20 families.
