= Qezelcheh-ye Pashmak =

Village in Golestan province, Iran

Qezelcheh-ye Pashmak Persian: قزلچه پشمك
- Village
- Location within Iran
- Country: Iran
- Province: Golestan
- County: Gonbad-e Kavus
- District: Central
- Rural District: Fajr

Population (2016)
  - Total: 1,359
- Time zone: UTC+3:30 (IRST)

Qezelcheh-ye Pashmak (Persian: قزلچه پشمك) (Note: Also romanized as Qezeljeh-ye Pashmak; also known as Qaranjeh Pashmak) is a village in Fajr Rural District of the Central District in Gonbad-e Kavus County, Golestan province, Iran.

== Demographics ==
=== Population ===
At the time of the 2006 National Census, the village's population was 1,344 in 291 households. The following census in 2011 counted 1,244 people in 348 households. The 2016 census measured the population of the village as 1,359 people in 392 households.
