= Fajr Rural District (Gonbad-e Kavus County) =

Rural district in Golestan province, Iran

Fajr Rural District Persian: دهستان فجر
- Rural District
- Location within Iran
- Coordinates: 37°15′N 55°16′E
- Country: Iran
- Province: Golestan
- County: Gonbad-e Kavus
- District: Central
- Established: 1987
- Capital: Fajr

Population (2016)
  - Total: 52,923
- Time zone: UTC+3:30 (IRST)

Fajr Rural District (Persian: دهستان فجر) is in the Central District of Gonbad-e Kavus County, Golestan province, Iran. Its capital is the village of Fajr.

== Demographics ==
=== Population ===
At the time of the 2006 National Census, the rural district's population was 40,672 in 8,932 households. There were 50,678 inhabitants in 12,288 households at the following census of 2011. The 2016 census measured the population of the rural district as 52,923 in 14,304 households. The most populous of its 33 villages was Zaboliabad, with 4,738 people.

=== Other villages in the rural district ===
- Abbasabad
- Araz Mohammad Akhund
- Baraniha
- Baylar
- Bozaqabad
- Ertaq Hajji
- Eslamabad-e Gonbad
- Hajji Balkhan
- Hajjilar Qaleh
- Hasanabad
- Igder-e Olya
- Igder-e Sofla
- Imer-e Mohammad Qoli Akhund
- Jalain Tappeh
- Kuchek Olum
- Kuchek Yurt Sheykhan
- Marjanabad
- Molla Taqi
- Pashmak Panadeh
- Poli Hajji
- Qezelcheh-ye Pashmak
- Quinli
- Qul Hajji
- Sarjeh Kor
- Sarli-ye Olya
- Sarli-ye Sofla
- Someh Makhtum
- Taleqan Tappeh
