= Shahrak-e Igder =

Shahrak-e Igder شهرك ايگدر
- Village
- Location within Iran
- Coordinates: 30°26′54″N 52°17′59″E
- Country: Iran
- Province: Fars
- County: Eqlid
- Bakhsh: Hasanabad
- Rural District: Bakan

Population (2006)
  - Total: 505
- Time zone: UTC+3:30 (IRST)
  - Summer (DST): UTC+4:30 (IRDT)

Shahrak-e Igder (Persian: شهرك ايگدر, also Romanized as Shahrak-e Īgder; also known as Īgder) is a village in Bakan Rural District, Hasanabad District, Eqlid County, Fars province, Iran. At the 2006 census, its population was 505, in 113 families.
