= Qezeljeh-ye Akrad =

Qezeljeh-ye Akrad قزلجه اكراد
- Village
- Location within Iran
- Coordinates: 37°50′30″N 47°16′30″E
- Country: Iran
- Province: East Azerbaijan
- County: Sarab
- Bakhsh: Central
- Rural District: Abarghan

Population (2006)
  - Total: 73
- Time zone: UTC+3:30 (IRST)
  - Summer (DST): UTC+4:30 (IRDT)

Qezeljeh-ye Akrad (Persian: قزلجه اكراد, also Romanized as Qezeljeh-ye Akrād) is a village in Abarghan Rural District, in the Central District of Sarab County, East Azerbaijan Province, Iran. At the 2006 census, its population was 73, in 16 families.
