= Owghaz Tazeh =

Village in North Khorasan province, Iran

Owghaz Tazeh Persian: اوغاز تازه
- Village
- Location within Iran
- Coordinates: 37°31′43″N 58°11′30″E
- Country: Iran
- Province: North Khorasan
- County: Shirvan
- District: Central
- Rural District: Sivkanlu

Population (2016)
  - Total: 670
- Time zone: UTC+3:30 (IRST)

Owghaz Tazeh (Persian: اوغازتازه) (Note: Also romanized as Owghāz Tāzeh and Owghāz-e Tāzeh; also known as Taza Oghāz, Tāzeh Owghāz, and Ūghāz Tāzeh) is a village in Sivkanlu Rural District of the Central District in Shirvan County, North Khorasan province, Iran.

== Demographics ==
=== Population ===
At the time of the 2006 National Census, the village's population was 579 in 172 households. The following census in 2011 counted 586 people in 186 households. The 2016 census measured the population of the village as 670 people in 230 households, the most populous in its rural district.
