= Honameh =

Village in North Khorasan province, Iran

Honameh Persian: هنامه
- Village
- Location within Iran
- Coordinates: 37°30′39″N 58°00′59″E
- Country: Iran
- Province: North Khorasan
- County: Shirvan
- District: Central
- Rural District: Sivkanlu

Population (2016)
  - Total: 147
- Time zone: UTC+3:30 (IRST)

Honameh (Persian: هنامه) (Note: Also romanized as Honāmeh; also known as Honāmeh-ye Bozorg and Honnāmeh-ye Bozorg) is a village in, and the capital of, Sivkanlu Rural District in the Central District of Shirvan County, North Khorasan province, Iran.

== Demographics ==
=== Population ===
At the time of the 2006 National Census, the village's population was 318 in 86 households. The following census in 2011 counted 250 people in 82 households. The 2016 census measured the population of the village as 147 people in 55 households.
