= Qezeljeh, Kuhin =

Qezeljeh قزلجه
- Village
- Location within Iran
- Coordinates: 35°12′40″N 48°22′43″E
- Country: Iran
- Province: Hamadan
- County: Kabudarahang
- Bakhsh: Central
- Rural District: Kuhin

Population (2006)
  - Total: 293
- Time zone: UTC+3:30 (IRST)
  - Summer (DST): UTC+4:30 (IRDT)

Qezeljeh (Persian: قزلجه; also known as Ghezelcheh and Qiziljeh) is a village in Kuhin Rural District, in the Central District of Kabudarahang County, Hamadan Province, Iran. At the 2006 census, its population was 293, in 68 families.
