= Bi Bi Shirvan =

Village in Golestan province, Iran

Bi Bi Shirvan Persian: بي بي شيروان
- Village
- Location within Iran
- Coordinates: 37°13′22″N 54°49′14″E
- Country: Iran
- Province: Golestan
- County: Gonbad-e Kavus
- District: Central
- Rural District: Bagheli-ye Marama

Population (2016)
  - Total: 4,199
- Time zone: UTC+3:30 (IRST)

Bi Bi Shirvan (Persian: بي بي شيروان) (Note: Also romanized as Bī Bī Shīrvān) is a village in Bagheli-ye Marama Rural District of the Central District in Gonbad-e Kavus County, Golestan province, Iran.

== Demographics ==
=== Population ===
At the time of the 2006 National Census, the village's population was 3,247 in 723 households. The following census in 2011 counted 3,830 people in 938 households. The 2016 census measured the population of the village as 4,199 people in 1,159 households. It was the most populous village in its rural district.

== See also ==
- Ban Shirvan
- Shirvan
