= Qezeljeh-ye Sofla, West Azerbaijan =

Qezeljeh-ye Sofla قزلجه سفلي
- Village
- Location within Iran
- Coordinates: 36°41′48″N 45°50′36″E
- Country: Iran
- Province: West Azerbaijan
- County: Mahabad
- Bakhsh: Central
- Rural District: Akhtachi-ye Gharbi

Population (2006)
  - Total: 115
- Time zone: UTC+3:30 (IRST)
  - Summer (DST): UTC+4:30 (IRDT)

Qezeljeh-ye Sofla (Persian: قزلجه سفلي, also romanized as Qezeljeh-ye Soflá; also known as Qezeljeh-ye Pā'īn) is a village in Akhtachi-ye Gharbi Rural District, in the Central District of Mahabad County, West Azerbaijan Province, Iran. At the 2006 census, its population was 115, in 20 families.
