= Karkhaneh-ye Qand-e Shirvan =

Village in North Khorasan province, Iran

Karkhaneh-ye Qand-e Shirvan Persian: كارخانه قندشيروان
- Village
- Location within Iran
- Coordinates: 37°26′08″N 57°46′22″E
- Country: Iran
- Province: North Khorasan
- County: Shirvan
- District: Central
- Rural District: Ziarat

Population (2016)
  - Total: 288
- Time zone: UTC+3:30 (IRST)

Karkhaneh-ye Qand-e Shirvan (Persian: كارخانه قندشيروان) (Note: Also romanized as Kārkhāneh-ye Qand-e Shīrvān) is a village in Ziarat Rural District of the Central District in Shirvan County, North Khorasan province, Iran.

== Demographics ==
=== Population ===
At the time of the 2006 National Census, the village's population was 406 in 89 households. The following census in 2011 counted 291 people in 68 households. The 2016 census measured the population of the village as 288 people in 77 households.
