= Ban Shirvan =

Ban Shirvan بان شيروان
- Village
- Location within Iran
- Coordinates: 34°34′08″N 46°19′55″E
- Country: Iran
- Province: Kermanshah
- County: Dalahu
- Bakhsh: Gahvareh
- Rural District: Qalkhani

Population (2006)
  - Total: 79
- Time zone: UTC+3:30 (IRST)
  - Summer (DST): UTC+4:30 (IRDT)

Ban Shirvan (Persian: بان شيروان, also Romanized as Bān Shīrvān; also known as Bān Shīrvān-e Tofangchī) is a village in Qalkhani Rural District, Gahvareh District, Dalahu County, Kermanshah Province, Iran. At the 2006 census, its population was 79, in 14 families.

== See also ==
- Bi Bi Shirvan
- Shirvan
