= Qezeljeh Gol =

Qezeljeh Gol قزلجه گل
- Village
- Location within Iran
- Coordinates: 38°54′41″N 45°09′39″E
- Country: Iran
- Province: West Azerbaijan
- County: Chaypareh
- Bakhsh: Hajjilar
- Rural District: Hajjilar-e Shomali

Population (2006)
  - Total: 64
- Time zone: UTC+3:30 (IRST)
  - Summer (DST): UTC+4:30 (IRDT)

Qezeljeh Gol (Persian: قزلجه گل; also known as Qezelcheh Gol) is a village in Hajjilar-e Shomali Rural District, Hajjilar District, Chaypareh County, West Azerbaijan Province, Iran. At the 2006 census, its population was 64, in 14 families.
