= Sivkanlu Rural District =

Rural district in North Khorasan province, Iran

Sivkanlu Rural District Persian: دهستان سيوكانلو
- Rural District
- Location within Iran
- Coordinates: 37°32′N 58°08′E
- Country: Iran
- Province: North Khorasan
- County: Shirvan
- District: Central
- Established: 1987
- Capital: Honameh

Population (2016)
  - Total: 6,350
- Time zone: UTC+3:30 (IRST)

Sivkanlu Rural District (Persian: دهستان سيوكانلو) is in the Central District of Shirvan County, North Khorasan province, Iran. Its capital is the village of Honameh.

== Demographics ==
=== Population ===
At the time of the 2006 National Census, the rural district's population was 7,501 in 1,877 households. There were 6,388 inhabitants in 1,830 households at the following census of 2011. The 2016 census measured the population of the rural district as 6,350 in 2,019 households. The most populous of its 30 villages was Owghaz Tazeh, with 670 people.

=== Other villages in the rural district ===
- Buanlu
- Kurkanlu-ye Sofla
- Owghaz Kohneh
- Qaleh Beyg Qarah Cheshmeh
- Qaleh Cheh
- Qaleh Hasan
