= Central District (Gonbad-e Qavus County) =

District in Golestan province, Iran

Central District (Gonbad-e Kavus County) Persian: بخش مرکزی شهرستان گنبد کاووس
- District
- Location within Iran
- Coordinates: 37°19′N 55°04′E
- Country: Iran
- Province: Golestan
- County: Gonbad-e Kavus
- Capital: Gonbad-e Kavus

Population (2016)
  - Total: 320,894
- Time zone: UTC+3:30 (IRST)

The Central District of Gonbad-e Kavus County (Persian: بخش مرکزی شهرستان گنبد کاووس) is in Golestan province, Iran. Its capital is the city of Gonbad-e Kavus.

== Demographics ==
=== Population ===
At the time of the 2006 National Census, the district's population was 261,492 in 59,054 households. The following census in 2011 counted 300,846 people in 77,501 households. The 2016 census measured the population of the district as 320,894 inhabitants in 89,646 households.

=== Administrative divisions ===
Central District (Gonbad-e Kavus County) Population
Administrative Divisions	2006	2011	2016
Aqabad RD	29,707	32,907	36,886
Bagheli-ye Marama RD	33,148	34,077	35,771
Fajr RD	40,672	50,678	52,923
Soltanali RD	30,798	38,638	43,404
Gonbad-e Kavus (city)	127,167	144,546	151,910
Total	261,492	300,846	320,894
RD = Rural District
