= Road 83 (Iran) =

Road in Iran

Road 83
- جاده 83

Route information
- Part of AH70
- Length: 211 km (131 mi)

Major junctions
- From: Dashli Borun, Golestan
- Road 18 Road 22
- To: Shahrud, Semnan; Road 44

Location
- Country: Iran
- Provinces: Golestan, Semnan
- Major cities: Gonbad, Golestan; Azadshahr, Golestan

Highway system
- Highways in Iran; Freeways

Road 83 is a road in Semnan connecting Shahrud to Azadshahr and Gonbad-e Qabus. It is the eastern North-South connection which passes the Alborz Mountains.

== Route ==
From North to South
	Gonbad-Maraveh Tappeh Road; North to Dashli Borun-Maraveh Tappeh; West to Incheh Borun-Aq Qala-Gorgan
	Qareh Makher
	Chapar Quymeh
	Gonbad Industrial Park
	Gonbad Eastern Bypass Expressway; Towards Mashhad-Azadshahr
Gonbad Kavoos
Aqqayeh Square	East to Aqabad- Kalaleh
Imam Khomeini Boulevard
	Arash Street; East to Gonbad Kavoos-City Center-Mashhad
	Gonbad-e Qabus (tower)
Enghelab Square	East to Taleghani Street - City Center -Bojnourd-Mashhad; West to Beheshti Street-Gadamabad
	Shohada Street; East to Gonbad Kavoos- City Center -Mashhad; West to Imamzadeh Yahya Bin Zaid
17th Shahrivar Square	East to Shahrivar 17th Street - City Center - Bojnourd - Mashhad; West to Entezami Street - Terminal - Imamzadeh Yahya Bin Zaid
	Jihad Boulevard; East to Gonbad Kavoos - City Center - Mashhad
Imam Khomeini Boulevard
Imam Ali Square	East to Gonbad Eastern Bypass (Sayad Shirazi) Expressway- City Center - Bojnourd - Mashhad; West to Yas Street - Imamzadeh Yahya Bin Zaid
	Persian Gulf Street; Towards the artificial lake
	Alman Road; Towards Anbar Olum-Aq Qala
Anbar-e Naft Service Station
	Gonbad Kavoos Cargo Terminal
Gonbad Kavoos
	Pashmak-e Towq Tamish
	Maraveh Tappeh-Mahmudabad Expressway (Khat-e Now); Towards Aq Qala-Aliabad-e Katul-Gorgan
Neginshahr
Neginshahr Service Station
	Neginshahr-City Center
Neginshahr
	Araz Taqan
Azadshahr
Allah Square	East to Mashhad-Gorgan-Rasht Highway - Minudasht - Bojnourd - Mashhad; West to Mashhad-Gorgan-Rasht Highway - Gorgan - Sari - Tehran; South to City Center
Koohsari Boulevard
	Bahonar Street; Towards Azadshahr-City Center
Koohsari Boulevard
Imam Ali Square	Towards Rajaee Street-Azadshahr-City Center-Gorgan-Tehran
Azadshahr
	Azadshahr Industrial Park
Now Deh Khanduz
	Now Deh Khanduz-City Center
Now Deh Khanduz
	Su Sara
	Narges Chal
	Farsian
	Tilabad
	Khvosh Yeylaq
Golestan Province; Semnan Province
	Ulang; Towards Ramian - Gorgan
	Kalateh-ye Khij
	Abr; Towards Abr Jungle - Aliabad-e Katul - Gorgan
	Kharqan
Bastam
Imam Sadegh Square	Towards Beheshti Street - Bastam - City Center
Bastam
	Shahrood-Gorgan Highway; Towards Tuskastan-Gorgan-Tehran
Shahrud
Imam Reza Square	Azadi Street; Towards Shahrud-City Center
Imam Reza Boulevard
Imam Reza Boulevard
Hosseini Square	Modares Street; Towards Shahrud - City Center
Shahrood Ringway Highway
	Khavaran Street; Towards Shahrud-City Center
Shahrud
Shahrood Ringway Highway
	Tehran-Mashhad Expressway (Imam Reza Expressway); East to Sabzevar-Nishapur-Mashhad; West to Semnan-Garmsar-Tehran
From South to North
