= Esferanjan =

Village in Golestan province, Iran

Esferanjan Persian: اسفرانجان
- Village
- Location within Iran
- Coordinates: 37°09′55″N 55°35′04″E
- Country: Iran
- Province: Golestan
- County: Minudasht
- District: Kuhsarat
- Rural District: Sar Gol

Population (2016)
  - Total: 265
- Time zone: UTC+3:30 (IRST)

Esferanjan (Persian: اسفرانجان) (Note: Also romanized as Esferānjān) is a village in Sar Gol Rural District of Kuhsarat District in Minudasht County, Golestan province, Iran.

== Demographics ==
=== Population ===
At the time of the 2006 National Census, the village's population was 206 in 47 households, when it was in Kuhsarat Rural District (Note: Renamed Garu Rural District) of the Central District. The following census in 2011 counted 235 people in 71 households, by which time the rural district had been separated from the district in the formation of Kuhsarat District and renamed Garu Rural District. Esferanjan was transferred to Sar Gol Rural District created in the new district. The 2016 census measured the population of the village as 265 people in 84 households.
