= Barayen =

Village in Golestan province, Iran

Barayen Persian: براین
- Village
- Location within Iran
- Coordinates: 37°11′06″N 55°39′58″E
- Country: Iran
- Province: Golestan
- County: Minudasht
- District: Kuhsarat
- Rural District: Sar Gol

Population (2016)
  - Total: 405
- Time zone: UTC+3:30 (IRST)

Barayen (Persian: براین) (Note: Also romanized as Barāyen; also known as Barīn) is a village in Sar Gol Rural District of Kuhsarat District in Minudasht County, Golestan province, Iran.

== Demographics ==
=== Population ===
At the time of the 2006 National Census, the village's population was 594 in 142 households, when it was in Kuhsarat Rural District (Note: Renamed Garu Rural District) of the Central District. The following census in 2011 counted 553 people in 161 households, by which time the rural district had been separated from the district in the formation of Kuhsarat District and renamed Garu Rural District. Barayen was transferred to Sar Gol Rural District created in the new district. The 2016 census measured the population of the village as 405 people in 153 households.
