= Jalalabad, Golestan =

Jalalabad جلال آباد
- Village
- Interactive map of Jalalabad
- Coordinates: 37°6′7.362″N 55°10′26.357″E
- Country: Iran
- Province: Golestan
- County: Azadshahr
- Bakhsh: Central
- City: Azadshahr

Population (2011)
  - Total: 1,129
- Time zone: UTC+3:30 (IRST)

Jalalabad (Persian: جلال آباد, also Romanized as Jalālābād) is a northern suburb of the city of Azadshahr in Golestan Province, Iran.

It was formerly a village in Nezamabad Rural District, in the Central District of Azadshahr County At the 2011 census, its population was 1,129, in 299 families. Up from 1,044 people in 2006.
