= Berenjbon =

Village in Golestan province, Iran

Berenjbon Persian: برنج بن
- Village
- Location within Iran
- Coordinates: 37°09′18″N 55°35′29″E
- Country: Iran
- Province: Golestan
- County: Minudasht
- District: Kuhsarat
- Rural District: Sar Gol

Population (2016)
  - Total: 731
- Time zone: UTC+3:30 (IRST)

Berenjbon (Persian: برنج بن) (Note: Also known as Beranjabīn and Berūnjavīn) is a village in Sar Gol Rural District of Kuhsarat District in Minudasht County, Golestan province, Iran.

== Demographics ==
=== Population ===
At the time of the 2006 National Census, the village's population was 816 in 184 households, when it was in Kuhsarat Rural District (Note: Renamed Garu Rural District) of the Central District. The following census in 2011 counted 869 people in 243 households, by which time the rural district had been separated from the district in the formation of Kuhsarat District and renamed Garu Rural District. Berenjbon was transferred to Sar Gol Rural District created in the new district. The 2016 census measured the population of the village as 731 people in 202 households.
