= Kolasareh =

Village in Golestan province, Iran

Kolasareh Persian: كلاسره
- Village
- Location within Iran
- Coordinates: 37°09′19″N 55°37′42″E
- Country: Iran
- Province: Golestan
- County: Minudasht
- District: Kuhsarat
- Rural District: Sar Gol

Population (2016)
  - Total: 1,288
- Time zone: UTC+3:30 (IRST)

Kolasareh (Persian: كلاسره) (Note: Also romanized as Kolāsareh) is a village in Sar Gol Rural District of Kuhsarat District in Minudasht County, Golestan province, Iran.

== Demographics ==
=== Population ===
At the time of the 2006 National Census, the village's population was 1,341 in 275 households, when it was in Kuhsarat Rural District (Note: Renamed Garu Rural District) of the Central District. The following census in 2011 counted 1,509 people in 397 households, by which time the rural district had been separated from the district in the formation of Kuhsarat District and renamed Garu Rural District. Kolasareh was transferred to Sar Gol Rural District created in the new district. The 2016 census measured the population of the village as 1,288 people in 391 households. It was the most populous village in its rural district.
