= Gol Cheshmeh =

Gol Cheshmeh or Gol Chashmeh or Golcheshmeh (Persian: گل چشمه) may refer to:

- Gol Cheshmeh, Ardabil
- Gol Cheshmeh, Golestan
- Gol Cheshmeh, Azadshahr, Golestan Province
- Gol Cheshmeh Culture and Technology Centre
- Golcheshmeh-ye Bala, Markazi Province
- Gol Cheshmeh, Qazvin

== See also ==
- Cheshmeh Gol (disambiguation)
