= Chamani =

Chamani may refer to:

- Chamani Seneviratne (b. 1978), Sri Lankan cricketer
- Miriam Chamani (b. 1943), American voodoo leader

== Iran ==
- Chamani, Iran, a village in Fars Province, Iran
- Chakher Chamani, a village in Ardabil Province, Iran
- Chamani-ye Bala, a village in Golestan Province, Iran
- Chamani-ye Pain, a village in Golestan Province, Iran
- Chamani-ye Vasat, a village in Golestan Province, Iran
- Chamani-ye Jafar Beyk, a village in Lorestan Province, Iran
