= Dorjan =

Village in Golestan province, Iran

Dorjan Persian: درجن
- Village
- Location within Iran
- Coordinates: 37°08′18″N 55°36′31″E
- Country: Iran
- Province: Golestan
- County: Minudasht
- District: Kuhsarat
- Rural District: Sar Gol

Population (2016)
  - Total: 821
- Time zone: UTC+3:30 (IRST)

Dorjan (Persian: درجن) (Note: Also known as Darjan, Dowrjen, and Dūrjan) is a village in, and the capital of, Sar Gol Rural District in Kuhsarat District of Minudasht County, Golestan province, Iran.

== Demographics ==
=== Population ===
At the time of the 2006 National Census, the village's population was 846 in 206 households, when it was in Kuhsarat Rural District (Note: Renamed Garu Rural District) of the Central District. The following census in 2011 counted 924 people in 231 households, by which time the rural district had been separated from the district in the formation of Kuhsarat District and renamed Garu Rural District. Durjan was transferred to Sar Gol Rural District created in the new district. The 2016 census measured the population of the village as 821 people in 246 households.
