= Deh Chenashk =

Village in Golestan province, Iran

Deh Chenashk Persian: ده چناشک
- Village
- Location within Iran
- Coordinates: 37°04′11″N 55°31′31″E
- Country: Iran
- Province: Golestan
- County: Minudasht
- District: Kuhsarat
- Rural District: Garu

Population (2016)
  - Total: 647
- Time zone: UTC+3:30 (IRST)

Deh Chenashk (Persian: ده چناشک) (Note: Also romanized as Deh Chenāshk; also known as Chenāshak) is a village in Garu Rural District (Note: Formerly Kuhsarat Rural District) of Kuhsarat District in Minudasht County, Golestan province, Iran.

== Demographics ==
=== Population ===
At the time of the 2006 National Census, the village's population was 648 in 176 households, when it was in Kuhsarat Rural District (Note: Renamed Garu Rural District) of the Central District. The following census in 2011 counted 770 people in 196 households, by which time the rural district had been separated from the district in the formation of Kuhsarat District and was renamed Garu Rural District. The 2016 census measured the population of the village as 647 people in 205 households.
