= Mohammad Aliabad, Golestan =

Neighborhood in Golestan province, Iran

Mohammad Aliabad Persian: محمد علی آباد
- Neighborhood
- Location within Iran
- Coordinates: 36°54′29″N 55°27′56″E
- Country: Iran
- Province: Golestan
- County: Azadshahr
- District: Cheshmeh Saran
- Rural District: Cheshmeh Saran
- Village: Tilabad

Population (2016)
  - Total: 410
- Time zone: UTC+3:30 (IRST)

Mohammad Aliabad (Persian: محمد علی آباد) (Note: Also romanized as Moḩammad ‘Alīābād) is a neighborhood in the village of Tilabad in Cheshmeh Saran Rural District of Cheshmeh Saran District in Azadshahr County, Golestan province, Iran.

== Demographics ==
=== Population ===
At the time of the 2006 National Census, Mohammad Aliabad's population was 566 in 131 households, when it was a village in Cheshmeh Saran Rural District. The following census in 2011 counted 743 people in 232 households. The 2016 census measured the population of the village as 410 people in 127 households.

In 2019, Mohammad Aliabad merged with the village of Tilabad.
