= Tashdeh =

Village in Golestan province, Iran

Tashdeh Persian: تاشده، تاشته
- Village
- Location within Iran
- Coordinates: 37°13′33″N 55°27′44″E
- Country: Iran
- Province: Golestan
- County: Minudasht
- District: Kuhsarat
- Rural District: Garu

Population (2016)
  - Total: 305
- Time zone: UTC+3:30 (IRST)

Tashdeh (Persian: تاشده) (Note: Also romanized as Tāshdeh; also known as Tāshteh) is a village in Garu Rural District (Note: Formerly Kuhsarat Rural District) of Kuhsarat District in Minudasht County, Golestan province, Iran.

== Demographics ==
=== Population ===
At the time of the 2006 National Census, the village's population was 309 in 79 households, when it was in Kuhsarat Rural District (Note: Renamed Garu Rural District) of the Central District. The following census in 2011 counted 331 people in 96 households, by which time the rural district had been separated from the district in the formation of Kuhsarat District and was renamed Garu Rural District. The 2016 census measured the population of the village as 305 people in 89 households.
