= Sayer, Iran =

Village in Golestan province, Iran

Sayer Persian: ساير
- Village
- Location within Iran
- Coordinates: 37°10′30″N 55°38′10″E
- Country: Iran
- Province: Golestan
- County: Minudasht
- District: Kuhsarat
- Rural District: Sar Gol

Population (2016)
  - Total: 498
- Time zone: UTC+3:30 (IRST)

Sayer (Persian: ساير) (Note: Also romanized as Saier, Sair, and Sāyer) is a village in Sar Gol Rural District of Kuhsarat District in Minudasht County, Golestan province, Iran.

== Demographics ==
=== Population ===
At the time of the 2006 National Census, the village's population was 461 in 98 households, when it was in Kuhsarat Rural District (Note: Renamed Garu Rural District) of the Central District. The following census in 2011 counted 461 people in 135 households, by which time the rural district had been separated from the district in the formation of Kuhsarat District and renamed Garu Rural District. Sayer was transferred to Sar Gol Rural District created in the new district. The 2016 census measured the population of the village as 498 people in 152 households.
