= Narseh, Iran =

Village in Golestan province, Iran

Narseh Persian: نرسه
- Village
- Location within Iran
- Coordinates: 37°05′52″N 55°34′56″E
- Country: Iran
- Province: Golestan
- County: Minudasht
- District: Kuhsarat
- Rural District: Garu

Population (2016)
  - Total: 97
- Time zone: UTC+3:30 (IRST)

Narseh (Persian: نرسه) (Note: Also romanized as Nerseh; also known as Narsen) is a village in Garu Rural District (Note: Formerly Kuhsarat Rural District) of Kuhsarat District in Minudasht County, Golestan province, Iran.

== Demographics ==
=== Population ===
At the time of the 2006 National Census, the village's population was 82 in 22 households, when it was in Kuhsarat Rural District (Note: Renamed Garu Rural District) of the Central District. The following census in 2011 counted 92 people in 26 households, by which time the rural district had been separated from the district in the formation of Kuhsarat District and was renamed Garu Rural District. The 2016 census measured the population of the village as 97 people in 32 households.
