= Tuska Chal =

Village in Golestan province, Iran

Tuska Chal Persian: توسكاچال
- Village
- Location within Iran
- Coordinates: 37°12′06″N 55°31′52″E
- Country: Iran
- Province: Golestan
- County: Minudasht
- District: Kuhsarat
- Rural District: Garu

Population (2016)
  - Total: 607
- Time zone: UTC+3:30 (IRST)

Tuska Chal (Persian: توسكاچال) (Note: Also romanized as Towskā Chāl and Tūskā Chāl) is a village in Garu Rural District (Note: Formerly Kuhsarat Rural District) of Kuhsarat District in Minudasht County, Golestan province, Iran.

== Demographics ==
=== Population ===
At the time of the 2006 National Census, the village's population was 526 in 137 households, when it was in Kuhsarat Rural District (Note: Renamed Garu Rural District) of the Central District. The following census in 2011 counted 584 people in 189 households, by which time the rural district had been separated from the district in the formation of Kuhsarat District and was renamed Garu Rural District. The 2016 census measured the population of the village as 607 people in 183 households.
