= Tarseh =

Village in Golestan province, Iran

Tarseh Persian: ترسه
- Village
- Location within Iran
- Coordinates: 37°05′23″N 55°33′54″E
- Country: Iran
- Province: Golestan
- County: Minudasht
- District: Kuhsarat
- Rural District: Garu

Population (2016)
  - Total: 734
- Time zone: UTC+3:30 (IRST)

Tarseh (Persian: ترسه) (Note: Also known as Tarsheh) is a village in Garu Rural District (Note: Formerly Kuhsarat Rural District) of Kuhsarat District in Minudasht County, Golestan province, Iran.

== Demographics ==
=== Population ===
At the time of the 2006 National Census, the village's population was 590 in 149 households, when it was in Kuhsarat Rural District (Note: Renamed Garu Rural District) of the Central District. The following census in 2011 counted 686 people in 183 households, by which time the rural district had been separated from the district in the formation of Kuhsarat District and was renamed Garu Rural District. The 2016 census measured the population of the village as 734 people in 236 households.
