= Now Deh-e Hajjilar =

Neighborhood in Golestan province, Iran

Now Deh-e Hajjilar Persian: نوده حاجی لر
- Neighborhood
- Location within Iran
- Coordinates: 37°04′31″N 55°16′12″E
- Country: Iran
- Province: Golestan
- County: Azadshahr
- District: Cheshmeh Saran
- City: Now Deh Khanduz

Population (2006)
  - Total: 822
- Time zone: UTC+3:30 (IRST)

Now Deh-e Hajjilar (Persian: نوده حاجی لر) (Note: Also romanized as Now Deh-e Ḩājjīlar; also known as Now Deh and Now Deh-e Esmā‘īl Khān) is a neighborhood in the city of Now Deh Khanduz in Cheshmeh Saran District of Azadshahr County, Golestan province, Iran.

== Demographics ==
=== Population ===
At the time of the 2006 National Census, Now Deh-e Hajjilar's population was 822 in 209 households, when it was a village in Khormarud-e Jonubi Rural District. (Note: Formerly Khormarud Rural District) After the census, the village was annexed to the city of Now Deh Khanduz.
