= Ulang, Golestan =

Village in Golestan province, Iran

Ulang Persian: اولنگ
- Village
- Location within Iran
- Coordinates: 37°08′56″N 55°37′19″E
- Country: Iran
- Province: Golestan
- County: Minudasht
- District: Kuhsarat
- Rural District: Sar Gol

Population (2016)
  - Total: 83
- Time zone: UTC+3:30 (IRST)

Ulang (Persian: اولنگ) (Note: Also romanized as Ūlang) is a village in Sar Gol Rural District of Kuhsarat District in Minudasht County, Golestan province, Iran.

== Demographics ==
=== Population ===
At the time of the 2006 National Census, the village's population was 146 in 35 households, when it was in Kuhsarat Rural District (Note: Renamed Garu Rural District) of the Central District. The following census in 2011 counted 113 people in 33 households, by which time the rural district had been separated from the district in the formation of Kuhsarat District and renamed Garu Rural District. Ulang was transferred to Sar Gol Rural District created in the new district. The 2016 census measured the population of the village as 83 people in 30 households.
