= Safiabad, Golestan =

Village in Golestan province, Iran

Safiabad Persian: صفی آباد
- Village
- Location within Iran
- Coordinates: 37°10′36″N 55°32′59″E
- Country: Iran
- Province: Golestan
- County: Minudasht
- District: Kuhsarat
- Rural District: Garu

Population (2016)
  - Total: 1,666
- Time zone: UTC+3:30 (IRST)

Safiabad (Persian: صفی آباد) (Note: Also romanized as Şafīābād) is a village in, and the capital of, Garu Rural District (Note: Formerly Kuhsarat Rural District) in Kuhsarat District of Minudasht County, Golestan province, Iran. The previous capital of the rural district was the village of Dozeyn, now a city.

== Demographics ==
=== Population ===
At the time of the 2006 National Census, the village's population was 1,379 in 352 households, when it was in Kuhsarat Rural District (Note: Renamed Garu Rural District) of the Central District. The following census in 2011 counted 1,568 people in 456 households, by which time the rural district had been separated from the district in the formation of Kuhsarat District and was renamed Garu Rural District. The 2016 census measured the population of the village as 1,666 people in 482 households.
