= Parangal =

Village in Golestan province, Iran

Parangal Persian: پرنگل
- Village
- Location within Iran
- Coordinates: 37°11′58″N 55°29′35″E
- Country: Iran
- Province: Golestan
- County: Minudasht
- District: Kuhsarat
- Rural District: Garu

Population (2016)
  - Total: 669
- Time zone: UTC+3:30 (IRST)

Parangal (Persian: پرنگل) (Note: Also known as Palangar and Partagal) is a village in Garu Rural District (Note: Formerly Kuhsarat Rural District) of Kuhsarat District in Minudasht County, Golestan province, Iran.

== Demographics ==
=== Population ===
At the time of the 2006 National Census, the village's population was 677 in 180 households, when it was in Kuhsarat Rural District (Note: Renamed Garu Rural District) of the Central District. The following census in 2011 counted 661 people in 209 households, by which time the rural district had been separated from the district in the formation of Kuhsarat District and was renamed Garu Rural District. The 2016 census measured the population of the village as 669 people in 197 households.
