= Aqcheli =

Aqcheli (Persian: اقچلي) may refer to:

- Aq Cheli-ye Sofla
- Aqcheli-ye Olya
- Aqcheli-ye Qerkhlar
