= Qezeljeh-ye Aq Emam =

Village in Golestan province, Iran

Qezeljeh-ye Aq Emam Persian: قزلجه آق امام
- Village
- Location within Iran
- Coordinates: 37°08′00″N 55°12′19″E
- Country: Iran
- Province: Golestan
- County: Azadshahr
- District: Central
- Rural District: Nezamabad

Population (2016)
  - Total: 2,584
- Time zone: UTC+3:30 (IRST)

Qezeljeh-ye Aq Emam (Persian: قزلجه آق امام) (Note: Also romanized as Qezeljeh-ye Āq Emām; also known as Qezelcheh-ye Āq Emām) is a village in Nezamabad Rural District of the Central District in Azadshahr County, Golestan province, Iran.

== Demographics ==
=== Population ===
At the time of the 2006 National Census, the village's population was 2,320 in 479 households. The following census in 2011 counted 2,535 people in 623 households. The 2016 census measured the population of the village as 2,584 people in 688 households.
