= Satleq Bay-ye Zeytunli =

Satleq Bay-ye Zeytunli صاتلق بای زیتونلی
- Village
- Location within Iran
- Coordinates: 37°09′03″N 55°07′47″E
- Country: Iran
- Province: Golestan
- County: Azadshahr
- Bakhsh: Central
- Rural District: Nezamabad

Population (2016)
  - Total: 264
- Time zone: UTC+3:30 (IRST)

Satleq Bay-ye Zeytunli (Persian: صاتلق بای زیتونلی, also Romanized as Sātleq Bāy-ye Zeytūnlī; also known as Shātleqbāy-ye Zeytūnlī) is a village in Nezamabad Rural District, in the Central District of Azadshahr County, Golestan Province, Iran. At the 2006 census, its population was 348, in 84 families. Down to 264 people and 70 households in 2016.
