= Kashidar =

Village in Golestan province, Iran

Kashidar Persian: كاشيدار
- Village
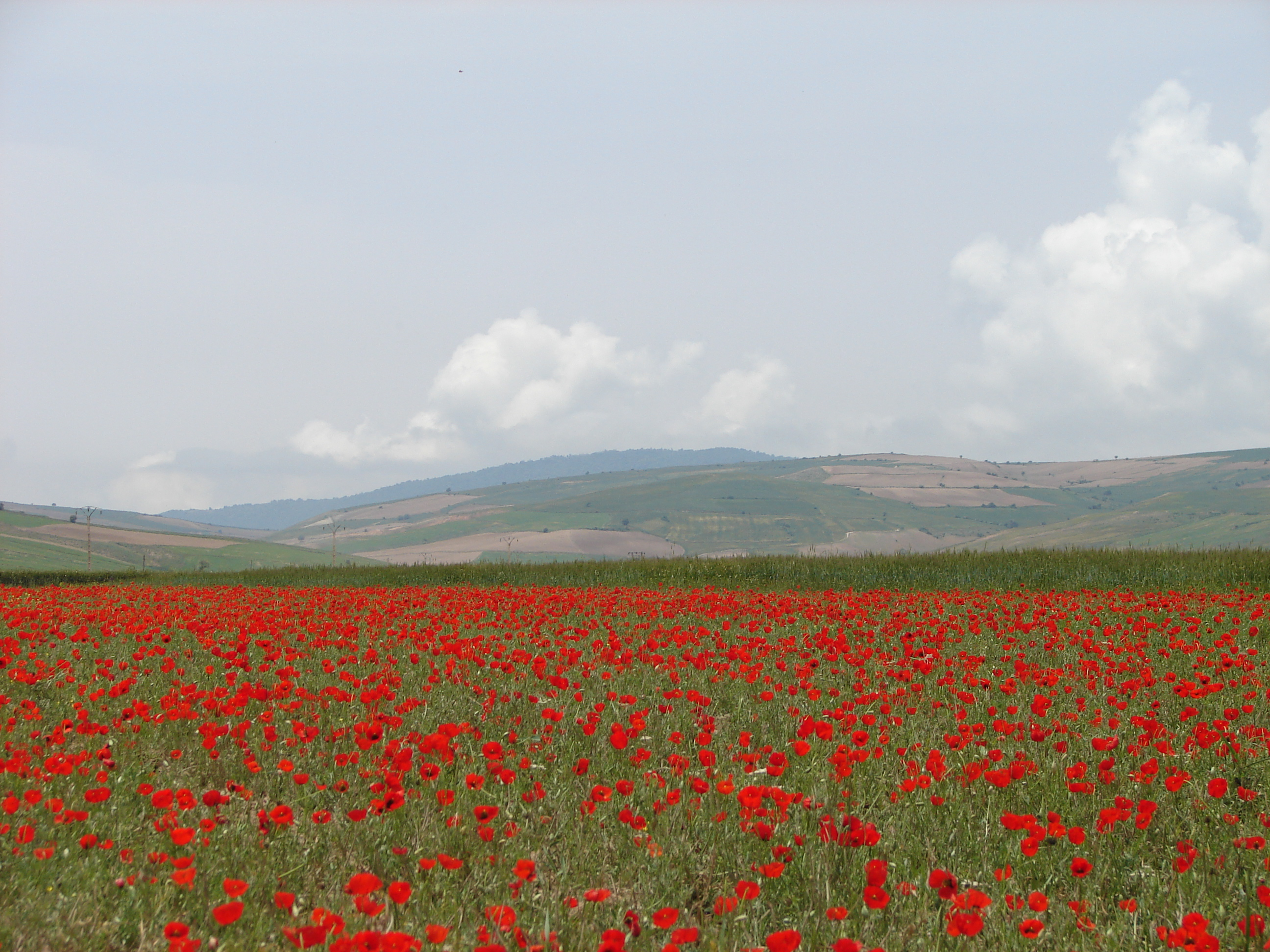
- Poppy-covered landscape near the village of Kashidar

- Location within Iran
- Coordinates: 36°59′23″N 55°33′32″E
- Country: Iran
- Province: Golestan
- County: Azadshahr
- District: Cheshmeh Saran
- Rural District: Cheshmeh Saran

Population (2016)
  - Total: 1,566
- Time zone: UTC+3:30 (IRST)

Kashidar (Persian: كاشيدار) (Note: Also romanized as Kāshīdār and Kashīdār) is a mountainous village in Cheshmeh Saran Rural District of Cheshmeh Saran District in Azadshahr County, Golestan province, Iran.

== Demographics ==
=== Population ===
At the time of the 2006 National Census, the village's population was 1,433 in 362 households. The following census in 2011 counted 1,498 people in 434 households. The 2016 census measured the population of the village as 1,566 people in 478 households.
