= Abbasabad-e Amelak =

Village in Golestan province, Iran

Abbasabad-e Amelak Persian: عباس آباد املاک
- Village
- Location within Iran
- Coordinates: 37°13′38″N 55°19′47″E
- Country: Iran
- Province: Golestan
- County: Minudasht
- District: Central
- Rural District: Chehel Chay

Population (2016)
  - Total: 660
- Time zone: UTC+3:30 (IRST)

Abbasabad-e Amelak (Persian: عباس آباد املاک) (Note: Also romanized as ‘Abbāsābād-e Āmelāḵ; also known as ‘Abāsābād) is a village in Chehel Chay Rural District of the Central District in Minudasht County, Golestan province, Iran.

== Demographics ==
=== Population ===
At the time of the 2006 National Census, the village's population was 604 in 122 households. The following census in 2011 counted 660 people in 160 households. The 2016 census measured the population of the village as 660 people in 162 households.
