= Cheshmeh Gol =

Cheshmeh Gol and Cheshmeh-ye Gol (Persian: چشمه گل) may refer to:

- Cheshmeh Gol, Fars
- Cheshmeh Gol, Torbat-e Jam, Razavi Khorasan Province
- Cheshmeh-ye Gol, Salehabad, Razavi Khorasan Province
- Cheshmeh Gol, West Azerbaijan

== See also ==
- Gol Cheshmeh (disambiguation)
