= Guggol =

Village in Golestan province, Iran

Guggol Persian: گوگل
- Village
- Location within Iran
- Coordinates: 37°14′43″N 55°22′27″E
- Country: Iran
- Province: Golestan
- County: Minudasht
- District: Central
- Rural District: Chehel Chay

Population (2016)
  - Total: 1,527
- Time zone: UTC+3:30 (IRST)

Guggol (Persian: گوگل) (Note: Also romanized as Gūggol; also known as Gūk Gol and Qokgol; Turkish: Gök Göl) is a village in Chehel Chay Rural District of the Central District in Minudasht County, Golestan province, Iran.

== Demographics ==
=== Population ===
At the time of the 2006 National Census, the village's population was 1,787 in 436 households. The following census in 2011 counted 1,770 people in 546 households. The 2016 census measured the population of the village as 1,527 people in 504 households.
