= Parsah Su =

Village in Golestan province, Iran

Parsah Su Persian: پرسه سو
- Village
- Location within Iran
- Coordinates: 37°14′55″N 55°23′37″E
- Country: Iran
- Province: Golestan
- County: Minudasht
- District: Central
- Rural District: Chehel Chay

Population (2016)
  - Total: 955
- Time zone: UTC+3:30 (IRST)

Parsah Su (Persian: پرسه سو) (Note: Also romanized as Parsah Sū; also known as Por Sūsū, Porsesu, and Shāhābād-e Parsah Sū) is a village in Chehel Chay Rural District of the Central District in Minudasht County, Golestan province, Iran.

== Demographics ==
=== Population ===
At the time of the 2006 National Census, the village's population was 970 in 239 households. The following census in 2011 counted 1,065 people in 293 households. The 2016 census measured the population of the village as 955 people in 301 households.
