= Mohammad Zaman Khan, Iran =

Village in Golestan province, Iran

Mohammad Zaman Khan Persian: محمدزمانخان
- Village
- Location within Iran
- Coordinates: 37°10′12″N 55°20′07″E
- Country: Iran
- Province: Golestan
- County: Minudasht
- District: Central
- Rural District: Chehel Chay

Population (2016)
  - Total: 811
- Time zone: UTC+3:30 (IRST)

Mohammad Zaman Khan (Persian: محمدزمانخان) (Note: Also romanized as Moḩammad Zamān Khān) is a village in Chehel Chay Rural District of the Central District in Minudasht County, Golestan province, Iran.

== Demographics ==
=== Population ===
At the time of the 2006 National Census, the village's population was 807 in 223 households. The following census in 2011 counted 830 people in 255 households. The 2016 census measured the population of the village as 811 people in 264 households.
