= Mami Aqcheli =

Mami Aqcheli ممی آقچلی
- Village
- Location within Iran
- Coordinates: 37°09′00″N 55°08′00″E
- Country: Iran
- Province: Golestan
- County: Azadshahr
- Bakhsh: Central
- Rural District: Nezamabad

Population (2016)
  - Total: 329
- Time zone: UTC+3:30 (IRST)

Mami Aqcheli (Persian: ممی آقچلی, also Romanized as Mamī Āqchelī and Mamī Āq Chālī; also known as Mamī Zeytonlī) is a village in Nezamabad Rural District, in the Central District of Azadshahr County, Golestan Province, Iran. At the 2016 census, its population was 329, in 89 families.. Up from 288 people in 2006.
