= Sib Chal =

Village in Golestan province, Iran

Sib Chal Persian: سيب چال
- Village
- Location within Iran
- Coordinates: 37°00′20″N 55°32′05″E
- Country: Iran
- Province: Golestan
- County: Azadshahr
- District: Cheshmeh Saran
- Rural District: Cheshmeh Saran

Population (2016)
  - Total: 528
- Time zone: UTC+3:30 (IRST)

Sib Chal (Persian: سيب چال) (Note: Also romanized as Sīb Chāl) is a village in Cheshmeh Saran Rural District of Cheshmeh Saran District in Azadshahr County, Golestan province, Iran.

== Demographics ==
=== Population ===
At the time of the 2006 National Census, the village's population was 485 in 99 households. The following census in 2011 counted 476 people in 138 households. The 2016 census measured the population of the village as 528 people in 162 households.
