= Hajjiabad, Azadshahr =

Village in Golestan province, Iran

Hajjiabad Persian: حاجی آباد
- Village
- Location within Iran
- Coordinates: 36°57′59″N 55°19′33″E
- Country: Iran
- Province: Golestan
- County: Azadshahr
- District: Cheshmeh Saran
- Rural District: Cheshmeh Saran

Population (2016)
  - Total: 18
- Time zone: UTC+3:30 (IRST)

Hajjiabad (Persian: حاجی آباد) (Note: Also romanized as Ḩājjīābād) is a village in Cheshmeh Saran Rural District of Cheshmeh Saran District in Azadshahr County, Golestan province, Iran.

== Demographics ==
=== Population ===
At the time of the 2006 National Census, the village's population was 63 in 19 households. The following census in 2011 counted 65 people in 21 households. The 2016 census measured the population of the village as 18 people in eight households.
