= Qalami =

Village in Golestan province, Iran

Qalami Persian: قلمي
- Village
- Location within Iran
- Coordinates: 37°11′49″N 55°19′14″E
- Country: Iran
- Province: Golestan
- County: Minudasht
- District: Central
- Rural District: Chehel Chay

Population (2016)
  - Total: 1,982
- Time zone: UTC+3:30 (IRST)

Qalami (Persian: قلمي) (Note: Also romanized as Qalamī) is a village in, and the capital of, Chehel Chay Rural District in the Central District of Minudasht County, Golestan province, Iran. The previous capital of the rural district was the village of Alqajar, now a city.

== Demographics ==
=== Population ===
At the time of the 2006 National Census, the village's population was 1,761 in 447 households. The following census in 2011 counted 2,143 people in 585 households. The 2016 census measured the population of the village as 1,982 people in 581 households.
