= Vamenan =

Village in Golestan province, Iran

Vamenan Persian: وامنان
- Village
- Location within Iran
- Coordinates: 37°00′33″N 55°33′21″E
- Country: Iran
- Province: Golestan
- County: Azadshahr
- District: Cheshmeh Saran
- Rural District: Cheshmeh Saran

Population (2016)
  - Total: 1,386
- Time zone: UTC+3:30 (IRST)

Vamenan (Persian: وامنان) (Note: Also romanized as Vāmenān, Vāmnān, and Vamnān) is a village in Cheshmeh Saran Rural District of Cheshmeh Saran District in Azadshahr County, Golestan province, Iran.

== Demographics ==
=== Population ===
At the time of the 2006 National Census, the village's population was 1,647 in 368 households. The following census in 2011 counted 1,477 people in 484 households. The 2016 census measured the population of the village as 1,386 people in 484 households.
