= Now Deh Garrison =

Village in Golestan province, Iran

Now Deh Garrison Persian: پادگان نظامي نوده
- Village/Military Installation
- Country: Iran
- Province: Golestan
- County: Azadshahr
- District: Cheshmeh Saran
- Rural District: Khormarud-e Jonubi

Population (2016)
  - Total: 109
- Time zone: UTC+3:30 (IRST)

Now Deh Garrison (Persian: پادگان نظامي نوده) (Note: Romanized as Pādegān Neẓāmī Now Deh) is a village and garrison in Khormarud-e Jonubi Rural District (Note: Formerly Khormarud Rural District) of Cheshmeh Saran District in Azadshahr County, Golestan province, Iran. It is a base for Islamic Republic of Iran Army Ground Forces.

== Demographics ==
=== Population ===
At the time of the 2006 National Census, the village's population was 98 in 21 households. The following census in 2011 counted 325 people in 20 households. The 2016 census measured the population of the village as 109 people in 16 households.
