= Qahveh Khaneh-ye Cheshmeh Bahar =

Village in Golestan province, Iran

Qahveh Khaneh-ye Cheshmeh Bahar Persian: قهوه خانه چشمه بهار
- Village
- Location within Iran
- Coordinates: 36°51′14″N 55°23′21″E
- Country: Iran
- Province: Golestan
- County: Azadshahr
- District: Cheshmeh Saran
- Rural District: Cheshmeh Saran

Population (2016)
  - Total: 15
- Time zone: UTC+3:30 (IRST)

Qahveh Khaneh-ye Cheshmeh Bahar (Persian: قهوه خانه چشمه بهار) is a village in Cheshmeh Saran Rural District of Cheshmeh Saran District in Azadshahr County, Golestan province, Iran.

== Demographics ==
=== Population ===
The village did not appear in the 2006 and 2011 National Censuses. The 2016 census measured the population of the village as 15 people in four households.
