= Saray Mohammad Hoseyn =

Village in Golestan province, Iran

Saray Mohammad Hoseyn Persian: سرای محمدحسين
- Village
- Location within Iran
- Coordinates: 37°03′21″N 55°18′57″E
- Country: Iran
- Province: Golestan
- County: Azadshahr
- District: Cheshmeh Saran
- Rural District: Khormarud-e Jonubi

Population (2016)
  - Total: 332
- Time zone: UTC+3:30 (IRST)

Saray Mohammad Hoseyn (Persian: سرای محمدحسين) (Note: Also romanized as Sarāy Moḩammad Ḩoseyn; also known as Sarā Moḩammad Ḩoseyn and Sarabu (سرابو)) is a village in Khormarud-e Jonubi Rural District (Note: Formerly Khormarud Rural District) of Cheshmeh Saran District in Azadshahr County, Golestan province, Iran.

== Demographics ==
=== Population ===
At the time of the 2006 National Census, the village's population was 302 in 74 households. The following census in 2011 counted 323 people in 91 households. The 2016 census measured the population of the village as 332 people in 96 households.
