= Qurchay, Azadshahr =

Village in Golestan province, Iran

Qurchay Persian: قورچاي
- Village
- Location within Iran
- Coordinates: 37°07′44″N 55°06′05″E
- Country: Iran
- Province: Golestan
- County: Azadshahr
- District: Central
- Rural District: Nezamabad

Population (2016)
  - Total: 3,847
- Time zone: UTC+3:30 (IRST)

Qurchay (Persian: قورچاي) (Note: Also romanized as Qūrchāy; also known as Qūrī Chāy) is a village in Nezamabad Rural District of the Central District in Azadshahr County, Golestan province, Iran.

== Demographics ==
=== Population ===
At the time of the 2006 National Census, the village's population was 3,325 in 825 households. The following census in 2011 counted 3,655 people in 945 households. The 2016 census measured the population of the village as 3,847 people in 1,044 households. It was the most populous village in its rural district.
