= Koveyt Mahalleh =

Village in Golestan province, Iran

Koveyt Mahalleh Persian: كويت محله
- Village
- Location within Iran
- Coordinates: 37°14′43″N 55°21′36″E
- Country: Iran
- Province: Golestan
- County: Minudasht
- District: Central
- Rural District: Chehel Chay

Population (2016)
  - Total: 549
- Time zone: UTC+3:30 (IRST)

Koveyt Mahalleh (Persian: كويت محله) (Note: Also romanized as Koveyt Maḩalleh) is a village in Chehel Chay Rural District of the Central District in Minudasht County, Golestan province, Iran.

== Demographics ==
=== Population ===
At the time of the 2006 National Census, the village's population was 652 in 141 households. The following census in 2011 counted 628 people in 166 households. The 2016 census measured the population of the village as 549 people in 155 households.
