= Chamani-ye Vasat =

Village in Golestan province, Iran

Chamani-ye Vasat Persian: چمانی وسط
- Village
- Location within Iran
- Coordinates: 37°05′01″N 55°32′48″E
- Country: Iran
- Province: Golestan
- County: Minudasht
- District: Kuhsarat
- Rural District: Garu

Population (2016)
  - Total: 86
- Time zone: UTC+3:30 (IRST)

Chamani-ye Vasat (Persian: چمانی وسط) (Note: Also romanized as Chamanī-ye Vasaţ and Chamānī-ye Vasaţ) is a village in Garu Rural District (Note: Formerly Kuhsarat Rural District) of Kuhsarat District in Minudasht County, Golestan province, Iran.

== Demographics ==
=== Population ===
At the time of the 2006 National Census, the village's population was 97 in 24 households, when it was in Kuhsarat Rural District (Note: Renamed Garu Rural District) of the Central District. The following census in 2011 counted 99 people in 27 households, by which time the rural district had been separated from the district in the formation of Kuhsarat District and was renamed Garu Rural District. The 2016 census measured the population of the village as 86 people in 25 households.
