= Takht, Golestan =

Village in Golestan province, Iran

Takht Persian: تخت
- Village
- Location within Iran
- Coordinates: 37°09′50″N 55°25′59″E
- Country: Iran
- Province: Golestan
- County: Minudasht
- District: Central
- Rural District: Chehel Chay

Population (2016)
  - Total: 862
- Time zone: UTC+3:30 (IRST)

Takht (Persian: تخت) is a village in Chehel Chay Rural District of the Central District in Minudasht County, Golestan province, Iran.

== Demographics ==
=== Population ===
At the time of the 2006 National Census, the village's population was 748 in 209 households. The following census in 2011 counted 834 people in 260 households. The 2016 census measured the population of the village as 862 people in 281 households.
