= Sherkat =

Sherkat (Persian: شركت) may refer to:

- Sherkat Chah village in Hirmand County, Sistan and Baluchestan province, Iran
- Sherkat Melli Haffari Iran FSC, futsal club in the city Ahvaz, Iran
- Sherkat-e Banader, village in Shush County, Khuzestan province, Iran
- Sherkat-e Baneh, village in Ramshir County, Khuzestan province, Iran
- Sherkat-e Khalkhal Dasht F.C., football club in the city of Khalkhal, Iran
- Sherkat-e Margh Tak, village in Abyek County, Qazvin province, Iran
- Sherkat-e Neka Chub, village in Miandorud County, Mazandaran province, Iran
- Sherkat-e Nikan Namak, village in Garmsar County, Semnan province, Iran
- Sherkat-e Parseylun, village in Khorramabad County, Lorestan province, Iran
- Sherkat-e Sahra, village in Minudasht County, Golestan province, Iran
