= Masumabad, Azadshahr =

Village in Golestan province, Iran

Masumabad Persian: معصوم اباد
- Village
- Location within Iran
- Coordinates: 36°54′39″N 55°19′38″E
- Country: Iran
- Province: Golestan
- County: Azadshahr
- District: Cheshmeh Saran
- Rural District: Cheshmeh Saran

Population (2016)
  - Total: 34
- Time zone: UTC+3:30 (IRST)

Masumabad (Persian: معصوم اباد) (Note: Also romanized as Ma‘şūmābād; also known as Ma‘şūmābād-e Qeshlāq) is a village in Cheshmeh Saran Rural District of Cheshmeh Saran District in Azadshahr County, Golestan province, Iran.

== Demographics ==
=== Population ===
At the time of the 2006 National Census, the village's population was 86 in 26 households. The following census in 2011 counted 57 people in 21 households. The 2016 census measured the population of the village as 34 people in 14 households.
