= Mohammadabad, Minudasht =

Village in Golestan province, Iran

Mohammadabad Persian: محمداباد
- Village
- Location within Iran
- Coordinates: 37°12′47″N 55°22′24″E
- Country: Iran
- Province: Golestan
- County: Minudasht
- District: Central
- Rural District: Chehel Chay

Population (2016)
  - Total: 564
- Time zone: UTC+3:30 (IRST)

Mohammadabad (Persian: محمداباد) (Note: Also romanized as Moḩammadābād) is a village in Chehel Chay Rural District of the Central District in Minudasht County, Golestan province, Iran.

== Demographics ==
=== Population ===
At the time of the 2006 National Census, the village's population was 351 in 96 households. The following census in 2011 counted 422 people in 130 households. The 2016 census measured the population of the village as 564 people in 179 households.
