= Abeh-ye Golha =

Abeh-ye Golha ابه گلها
- Village
- Location within Iran
- Coordinates: 37°07′14″N 55°08′17″E
- Country: Iran
- Province: Golestan
- County: Azadshahr
- Bakhsh: Central
- Rural District: Nezamabad

Population (2016)
  - Total: 309
- Time zone: UTC+3:30 (IRST)

Abeh-ye Golha (Persian: ابه گلها, also Romanized as Ābeh-ye Golhā; also known as Golhā) is a village in Nezamabad Rural District, in the Central District of Azadshahr County, Golestan Province, Iran. At the 2016 census, its population was 309, in 97 families. Down from 406 people in 2006.
