= Tatar Bayjeq =

Village in Golestan province, Iran

Tatar Bayjeq Persian: تاتاربايجق
- Village
- Location within Iran
- Coordinates: 37°09′53″N 55°10′12″E
- Country: Iran
- Province: Golestan
- County: Azadshahr
- District: Central
- Rural District: Nezamabad

Population (2016)
  - Total: 926
- Time zone: UTC+3:30 (IRST)

Tatar Bayjeq (Persian: تاتار بايجق) (Note: Also romanized as Tātār Bāyjeq; also known as Bāyjeq) is a village in Nezamabad Rural District of the Central District in Azadshahr County, Golestan province, Iran.

== Demographics ==
=== Population ===
At the time of the 2006 National Census, the village's population was 813 in 188 households. The following census in 2011 counted 926 people in 262 households. The 2016 census measured the population of the village as 926 people in 252 households.
