= Qarah Cheshmeh, Golestan =

Village in Golestan province, Iran

Qarah Cheshmeh Persian: قره چشمه
- Village
- Location within Iran
- Coordinates: 37°09′22″N 55°15′40″E
- Country: Iran
- Province: Golestan
- County: Minudasht
- District: Central
- Rural District: Chehel Chay

Population (2016)
  - Total: 2,910
- Time zone: UTC+3:30 (IRST)

Qarah Cheshmeh (Persian: قره چشمه) (Note: Also romanized as Qareh Cheshmeh) is a village in Chehel Chay Rural District of the Central District in Minudasht County, Golestan province, Iran.

== Demographics ==
=== Population ===
At the time of the 2006 National Census, the village's population was 2,756 in 622 households. The following census in 2011 counted 3,052 people in 744 households. The 2016 census measured the population of the village as 2,910 people in 780 households.
