= Abeh-ye Sabzvariha =

Village in Golestan province, Iran

Abeh-ye Sabzvariha Persian: ابه سبزواريها
- Village
- Location within Iran
- Coordinates: 37°07′23″N 55°08′48″E
- Country: Iran
- Province: Golestan
- County: Azadshahr
- District: Central
- Rural District: Nezamabad

Population (2016)
  - Total: 729
- Time zone: UTC+3:30 (IRST)

Abeh-ye Sabzvariha (Persian: ابه سبزواريها) (Note: Also romanized as Ābeh-ye Sabzvārīhā; also known as Sabzevārī) is a village in Nezamabad Rural District of the Central District in Azadshahr County, Golestan province, Iran.

== Demographics ==
=== Population ===
At the time of the 2006 National Census, the village's population was 703 in 163 households. The following census in 2011 counted 775 people in 200 households. The 2016 census measured the population of the village as 729 people in 208 households.
