= Baz Gir, Golestan =

Village in Golestan province, Iran

Baz Gir Persian: بازگير
- Village
- Location within Iran
- Coordinates: 37°15′05″N 55°21′14″E
- Country: Iran
- Province: Golestan
- County: Minudasht
- District: Central
- Rural District: Chehel Chay

Population (2016)
  - Total: 930
- Time zone: UTC+3:30 (IRST)

Baz Gir (Persian: بازگير) (Note: Also romanized as Bāz Gīr) is a village in Chehel Chay Rural District of the Central District in Minudasht County, Golestan province, Iran.

== Demographics ==
=== Population ===
At the time of the 2006 National Census, the village's population was 808 in 202 households. The following census in 2011 counted 827 people in 236 households. The 2016 census measured the population of the village as 930 people in 286 households.
