= Dasht Halqeh =

Village in Golestan province, Iran

Dasht Halqeh Persian: دشت حلقه
- Village
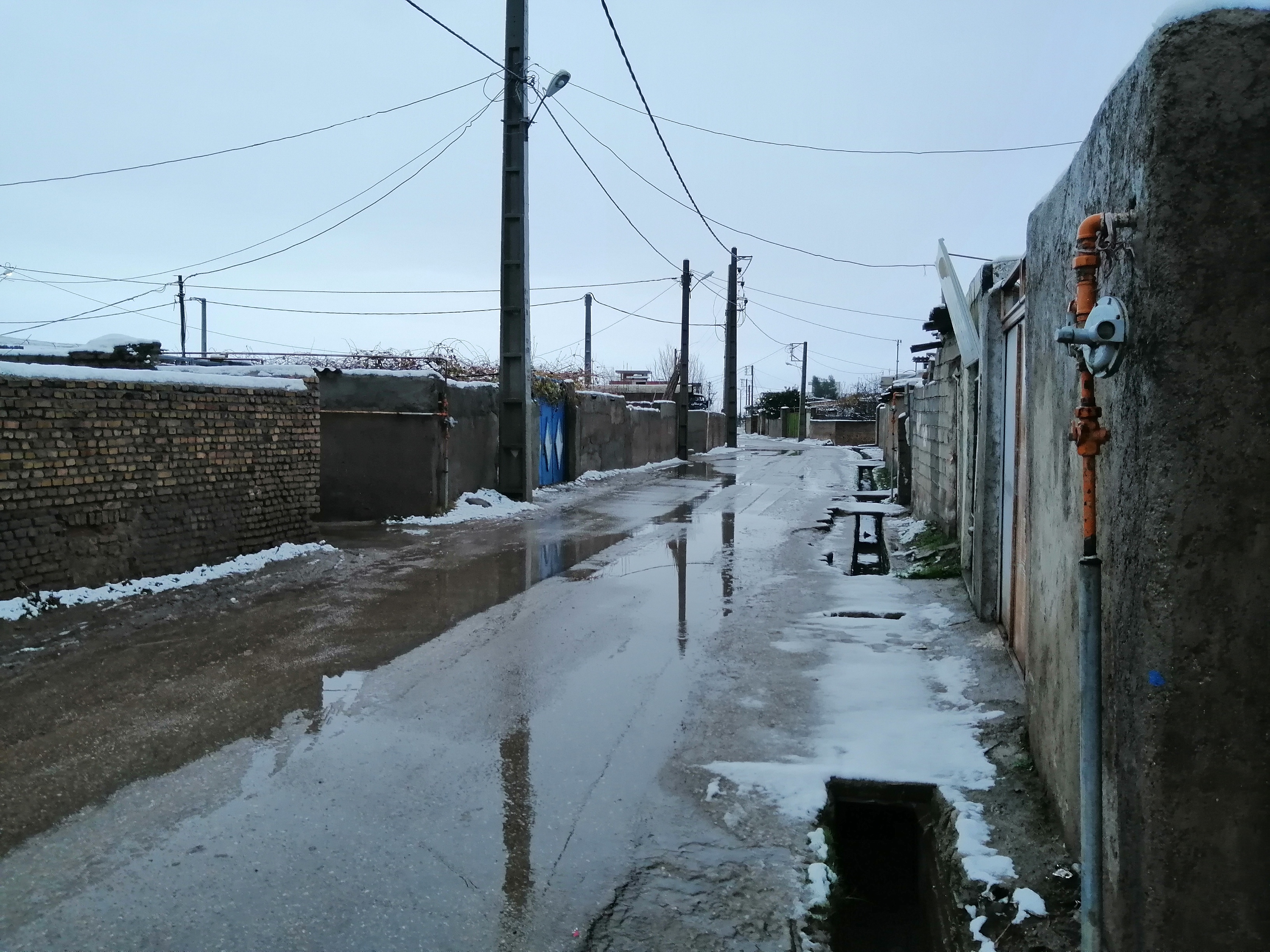
- The village of Dasht Halqeh

- Location within Iran
- Coordinates: 37°11′07″N 55°15′28″E
- Country: Iran
- Province: Golestan
- County: Minudasht
- District: Central
- Rural District: Chehel Chay

Population (2016)
  - Total: 743
- Time zone: UTC+3:30 (IRST)

Dasht Halqeh (Persian: دشت حلقه) (Note: Also romanized as Dasht Ḩalqeh; also known as Dasht Algheh) is a village in Chehel Chay Rural District of the Central District in Minudasht County, Golestan province, Iran.

== Demographics ==
=== Population ===
At the time of the 2006 National Census, the village's population was 700 in 148 households. The following census in 2011 counted 776 people in 182 households. The 2016 census measured the population of the village as 743 people in 200 households.
