= Sar Gol Rural District =

Rural district in Golestan province, Iran

Sar Gol Rural District Persian: دهستان سرگل
- Rural District
- Location within Iran
- Coordinates: 37°10′N 55°38′E
- Country: Iran
- Province: Golestan
- County: Minudasht
- District: Kuhsarat
- Established: 2010
- Capital: Dorjan

Population (2016)
  - Total: 4,091
- Time zone: UTC+3:30 (IRST)

Sar Gol Rural District (Persian: دهستان سرگل) is in Kuhsarat District of Minudasht County, Golestan province, Iran. Its capital is the village of Dorjan.

== History ==
In 2010, Kuhsarat Rural District (Note: Renamed Garu Rural District) was separated from the Central District in the formation of Kuhsarat District, and Sar Gol Rural District was created in the new district.

== Demographics ==
=== Population ===
At the time of the 2011 census, the rural district's population was 4,664 in 1,271 households. The 2016 census measured the population of the rural district as 4,091 in 1,258 households. The most populous of its seven villages was Kolasareh, with 1,288 people.

=== Other villages in the rural district ===
- Barayen
- Berenjbon
- Esferanjan
- Sayer
- Ulang
