= Rudbar, Golestan =

Village in Golestan province, Iran

Rudbar Persian: رودبار
- Village
- Location within Iran
- Coordinates: 36°54′16″N 55°19′16″E
- Country: Iran
- Province: Golestan
- County: Azadshahr
- District: Cheshmeh Saran
- Rural District: Cheshmeh Saran

Population (2016)
  - Total: 215
- Time zone: UTC+3:30 (IRST)

Rudbar (Persian: رودبار) (Note: Also romanized as Rūdbār) is a village in Cheshmeh Saran Rural District of Cheshmeh Saran District in Azadshahr County, Golestan province, Iran.

== Demographics ==
=== Population ===
At the time of the 2006 National Census, the village's population was 532 in 165 households. The following census in 2011 counted 230 people in 86 households. The 2016 census measured the population of the village as 215 people in 81 households.
