= Golcheshmeh Agro-Industry =

Golcheshmeh Agro-Industry كشت وصنعت گل چشمه
- industrial unit
- Interactive map of Golcheshmeh Agro-Industry
- Coordinates: 37°6′20.02″N 55°10′9.822″E
- Country: Iran
- Province: Golestan
- County: Azadshahr
- Bakhsh: Central
- Rural District: Nezamabad

Population (2016)
  - Total: 0
- Time zone: UTC+3:30 (IRST)

Golcheshmeh Agro-Industry (Persian: كشت وصنعت گل چشمه – Kesht va Sanʿat Gol Cheshmeh) is an Abadi and industrial centre in Nezamabad Rural District, in the Central District of Azadshahr County, Golestan Province, Iran.

It is a processing industry unit and one of the largest producers in Golestan province.

== Overview ==
The company belonged to Shams Pahlavi. After the revolution, the company was confiscated and handed over to the Mostazafan Foundation. At the peak of its activity, it had 300 workers and 700 hectares of land. Its land has reduced to less than 400 hectares of land and about 100 workers.

Golcheshmeh has a very large 10,000-ton cold storage facility, built in Italy. Many people from different parts of Iran bring their products in Golcheshmeh to be stored in exchange for rent. It also has a modern irrigation system, a tomato paste production plant, fish farming and gardening.

The company is said to have between 100 and 120 employees, of whom about 60 are permanent workers, and others work as contracting companies or on a contract basis, depending on the season.
