= Eslamabad-e Qeshlaq =

Village in Golestan province, Iran

Eslamabad-e Qeshlaq Persian: اسلام آباد قشلاق
- Village
- Location within Iran
- Coordinates: 36°55′05″N 55°21′21″E
- Country: Iran
- Province: Golestan
- County: Azadshahr
- District: Cheshmeh Saran
- Rural District: Cheshmeh Saran

Population (2016)
  - Total: 61
- Time zone: UTC+3:30 (IRST)

Eslamabad-e Qeshlaq (Persian: اسلام آباد قشلاق) (Note: Also romanized as Eslāmābād-e Qeshlāq; also known as Eslāmābād) is a village in Cheshmeh Saran Rural District of Cheshmeh Saran District in Azadshahr County, Golestan province, Iran.

== Demographics ==
=== Population ===
At the time of the 2006 National Census, the village's population was 91 in 26 households. The following census in 2011 counted 57 people in 18 households. The 2016 census measured the population of the village as 61 people in 19 households.
