= Ahmadabad, Azadshahr =

Village in Golestan province, Iran

Ahmadabad Persian: احمد آباد
- Village
- Location within Iran
- Coordinates: 37°08′50″N 55°11′19″E
- Country: Iran
- Province: Golestan
- County: Azadshahr
- District: Central
- Rural District: Nezamabad

Population (2016)
  - Total: 824
- Time zone: UTC+3:30 (IRST)

Ahmadabad (Persian: احمد آباد) (Note: Also romanized as Aḩmadābād) is a village in Nezamabad Rural District of the Central District in Azadshahr County, Golestan province, Iran.

== Demographics ==
=== Population ===
At the time of the 2006 National Census, the village's population was 1,014 in 212 households. The following census in 2011 counted 875 people in 191 households. The 2016 census measured the population of the village as 824 people in 223 households.
