= Narrab, Golestan =

Village in Golestan province, Iran

Narrab Persian: نراب
- Village
- Location within Iran
- Coordinates: 37°00′54″N 55°35′25″E
- Country: Iran
- Province: Golestan
- County: Azadshahr
- District: Cheshmeh Saran
- Rural District: Cheshmeh Saran

Population (2016)
  - Total: 2,187
- Time zone: UTC+3:30 (IRST)

Narrab (Persian: نراب) (Note: Also romanized as Narrāb) is a village in Cheshmeh Saran Rural District of Cheshmeh Saran District in Azadshahr County, Golestan province, Iran.

== Demographics ==
=== Population ===
At the time of the 2006 National Census, the village's population was 1,972 in 440 households. The following census in 2011 counted 2,129 people in 595 households. The 2016 census measured the population of the village as 2,187 people in 666 households. It was the most populous village in its rural district.
