= Hasan Khan, Golestan =

Village in Golestan province, Iran

Hasan Khan Persian: حسن خان
- Village
- Location within Iran
- Coordinates: 37°13′30″N 55°20′28″E
- Country: Iran
- Province: Golestan
- County: Minudasht
- District: Central
- Rural District: Chehel Chay

Population (2016)
  - Total: 1,009
- Time zone: UTC+3:30 (IRST)

Hasan Khan (Persian: حسن خان) (Note: Also romanized as Ḩasan Khān) is a village in Chehel Chay Rural District of the Central District in Minudasht County, Golestan province, Iran.

== Demographics ==
=== Population ===
At the time of the 2006 National Census, the village's population was 991 in 244 households. The following census in 2011 counted 1,071 people in 289 households. The 2016 census measured the population of the village as 1,009 people in 302 households.
