= Chamani-ye Pain =

Village in Golestan province, Iran

Chamani-ye Pain Persian: چمانی پایین
- Village
- Location within Iran
- Coordinates: 37°05′20″N 55°32′38″E
- Country: Iran
- Province: Golestan
- County: Minudasht
- District: Kuhsarat
- Rural District: Garu

Population (2016)
  - Total: 105
- Time zone: UTC+3:30 (IRST)

Chamani-ye Pain (Persian: چمانی پایین) (Note: Also romanized as Chamanī Pā’īn, Chamanī-ye Pa‘īn, and Chamānī-ye Pā’īn; also known as Chamān) is a village in Garu Rural District (Note: Formerly Kuhsarat Rural District) of Kuhsarat District in Minudasht County, Golestan province, Iran.

== Demographics ==
=== Population ===
At the time of the 2006 National Census, the village's population was 132 in 36 households, when it was in Kuhsarat Rural District (Note: Renamed Garu Rural District) of the Central District. The following census in 2011 counted 141 people in 41 households, by which time the rural district had been separated from the district in the formation of Kuhsarat District and was renamed Garu Rural District. The 2016 census measured the population of the village as 105 people in 33 households.
