= Ata Behlakeh =

Village in Golestan province, Iran

Ata Behlakeh Persian: عطابهلكه
- Village
- Location within Iran
- Coordinates: 37°10′18″N 55°06′57″E
- Country: Iran
- Province: Golestan
- County: Azadshahr
- District: Central
- Rural District: Nezamabad

Population (2016)
  - Total: 561
- Time zone: UTC+3:30 (IRST)

Ata Behlakeh (Persian: عطابهلكه) (Note: Also romanized as ‘Aţā Behlakeh) is a village in Nezamabad Rural District of the Central District in Azadshahr County, Golestan province, Iran.

== Demographics ==
=== Population ===
At the time of the 2006 National Census, the village's population was 464 in 112 households. The following census in 2011 counted 487 people in 124 households. The 2016 census measured the population of the village as 561 people in 176 households.
