= Vatan, Iran =

Village in Golestan province, Iran

Vatan Persian: وطن
- Village
- Location within Iran
- Coordinates: 36°58′29″N 55°16′13″E
- Country: Iran
- Province: Golestan
- County: Azadshahr
- District: Cheshmeh Saran
- Rural District: Khormarud-e Jonubi

Population (2016)
  - Total: 933
- Time zone: UTC+3:30 (IRST)

Vatan (Persian: وطن) (Note: Also romanized as Vaţan) is a village in Khormarud-e Jonubi Rural District (Note: Formerly Khormarud Rural District) of Cheshmeh Saran District in Azadshahr County, Golestan province, Iran.

== Demographics ==
=== Population ===
At the time of the 2006 National Census, the village's population was 852 in 228 households. The following census in 2011 counted 880 people in 261 households. The 2016 census measured the population of the village as 933 people in 322 households.
