= Kalu Kand =

Village in Golestan province, Iran

Kalu Kand Persian: كلوكند
- Village
- Location within Iran
- Coordinates: 37°12′52″N 55°21′19″E
- Country: Iran
- Province: Golestan
- County: Minudasht
- District: Central
- Rural District: Chehel Chay

Population (2016)
  - Total: 1,598
- Time zone: UTC+3:30 (IRST)

Kalu Kand (Turkish: کولَه‌کَند - Külə Kənd) (Note: Also romanized as Kalū Kand) is a village in Chehel Chay Rural District of the Central District in Minudasht County, Golestan province, Iran.

== Demographics ==
=== Population ===
At the time of the 2006 National Census, the village's population was 1,402 in 349 households. The following census in 2011 counted 1,635 people in 491 households. The 2016 census measured the population of the village as 1,598 people in 530 households.
