= Rahimabad, Golestan =

Village in Golestan province, Iran

Rahimabad Persian: رحيم آباد
- Village
- Location within Iran
- Coordinates: 36°58′58″N 55°20′57″E
- Country: Iran
- Province: Golestan
- County: Azadshahr
- District: Cheshmeh Saran
- Rural District: Cheshmeh Saran

Population (2016)
  - Total: 130
- Time zone: UTC+3:30 (IRST)

Rahimabad (Persian: رحيم آباد) (Note: Also romanized as Raḩīmābād) is a village in Cheshmeh Saran Rural District of Cheshmeh Saran District in Azadshahr County, Golestan province, Iran.

== Demographics ==
=== Population ===
At the time of the 2006 National Census, the village's population was 133 in 36 households. The following census in 2011 counted 121 people in 36 households. The 2016 census measured the population of the village as 130 people in 38 households.
