= Mehdiabad, Azadshahr =

Village in Golestan province, Iran

Mehdiabad Persian: مهدي آباد
- Village
- Location within Iran
- Coordinates: 36°56′25″N 55°23′25″E
- Country: Iran
- Province: Golestan
- County: Azadshahr
- District: Cheshmeh Saran
- Rural District: Cheshmeh Saran

Population (2016)
  - Total: 128
- Time zone: UTC+3:30 (IRST)

Mehdiabad (Persian: مهدي آباد) (Note: Also romanized as Mahdīābād and Mehdīābād) is a village in Cheshmeh Saran Rural District of Cheshmeh Saran District in Azadshahr County, Golestan province, Iran.

== Demographics ==
=== Population ===
At the time of the 2006 National Census, the village's population was 127 in 37 households. The following census in 2011 counted 139 people in 47 households. The 2016 census measured the population of the village as 128 people in 39 households.
