= Jahadabad, Golestan =

Village in Golestan province, Iran

Jahadabad Persian: جهادآباد
- Village
- Location within Iran
- Coordinates: 36°57′41″N 55°20′21″E
- Country: Iran
- Province: Golestan
- County: Azadshahr
- District: Cheshmeh Saran
- Rural District: Cheshmeh Saran

Population (2016)
  - Total: 0
- Time zone: UTC+3:30 (IRST)

Jahadabad (Persian: جهادآباد) (Note: Also romanized as Jahādābād; also known as Chādorābād) is a village in Cheshmeh Saran Rural District of Cheshmeh Saran District in Azadshahr County, Golestan province, Iran.

== Demographics ==
=== Population ===
At the time of the 2006 National Census, the village's population was 21 in eight households. The village did not appear in the following census of 2011. The 2016 census measured the population of the village as zero.
