= Nazar Chaqli =

Village in Golestan province, Iran

Nazar Chaqli Persian: نظرچاقلی
- Village
- Location within Iran
- Coordinates: 37°08′42″N 55°07′11″E
- Country: Iran
- Province: Golestan
- County: Azadshahr
- District: Central
- Rural District: Nezamabad

Population (2016)
  - Total: 819
- Time zone: UTC+3:30 (IRST)

Nazar Chaqli (Persian: نظرچاقلی) (Note: Also romanized as Naz̧ar Chāqlī; also known as Naz̧ar Chāghlī) is a village in Nezamabad Rural District of the Central District in Azadshahr County, Golestan province, Iran.

== Demographics ==
=== Population ===
At the time of the 2006 National Census, the village's population was 738 in 167 households. The following census in 2011 counted 813 people in 203 households. The 2016 census measured the population of the village as 819 people in 230 households.
