= Chamani-ye Bala =

Village in Golestan province, Iran

Chamani-ye Bala Persian: چمانی بالا
- Village
- Location within Iran
- Coordinates: 37°04′42″N 55°32′24″E
- Country: Iran
- Province: Golestan
- County: Minudasht
- District: Kuhsarat
- Rural District: Garu

Population (2016)
  - Total: 372
- Time zone: UTC+3:30 (IRST)

Chamani-ye Bala (Persian: چمانی بالا) (Note: Also romanized as Chamanī-ye Bālā and Chamānī-ye Bālā) is a village in Garu Rural District (Note: Formerly Kuhsarat Rural District) of Kuhsarat District in Minudasht County, Golestan province, Iran.

== Demographics ==
=== Population ===
At the time of the 2006 National Census, the village's population was 318 in 84 households, when it was in Kuhsarat Rural District (Note: Renamed Garu Rural District) of the Central District. The following census in 2011 counted 364 people in 86 households, by which time the rural district had been separated from the district in the formation of Kuhsarat District and was renamed Garu Rural District. The 2016 census measured the population of the village as 372 people in 103 households.
