= Ghaznavi, Iran =

Village in Golestan province, Iran

Ghaznavi Persian: غزنوي
- Village
- Location within Iran
- Coordinates: 36°56′19″N 55°27′12″E
- Country: Iran
- Province: Golestan
- County: Azadshahr
- District: Cheshmeh Saran
- Rural District: Cheshmeh Saran

Population (2016)
  - Total: 54
- Time zone: UTC+3:30 (IRST)

Ghaznavi (Persian: غزنوي) (Note: Also romanized as Ghaznavī and Ghoznavī; also known as Qaznavī, Qowzdovī, Qozdovī, Qūz Davī, and Qūzdovī) is a village in Cheshmeh Saran Rural District of Cheshmeh Saran District in Azadshahr County, Golestan province, Iran.

== Demographics ==
=== Population ===
At the time of the 2006 National Census, the village's population was 80 in 20 households. The following census in 2011 counted 55 people in 12 households. The 2016 census measured the population of the village as 54 people in 17 households.
