= Pas Poshteh, Golestan =

Village in Golestan province, Iran

Pas Poshteh Persian: پس پشته
- Village
- Location within Iran
- Coordinates: 37°10′29″N 55°20′53″E
- Country: Iran
- Province: Golestan
- County: Minudasht
- District: Central
- Rural District: Chehel Chay

Population (2016)
  - Total: 621
- Time zone: UTC+3:30 (IRST)

Pas Poshteh (Persian: پس پشته) is a village in Chehel Chay Rural District of the Central District in Minudasht County, Golestan province, Iran.

== Demographics ==
=== Population ===
At the time of the 2006 National Census, the village's population was 808 in 200 households. The following census in 2011 counted 781 people in 231 households. The 2016 census measured the population of the village as 621 people in 200 households.
