= Su Sara, Golestan =

Village in Golestan province, Iran

Su Sara Persian: سوسرا
- Village
- Location within Iran
- Coordinates: 37°03′26″N 55°17′33″E
- Country: Iran
- Province: Golestan
- County: Azadshahr
- District: Cheshmeh Saran
- Rural District: Khormarud-e Jonubi

Population (2016)
  - Total: 1,100
- Time zone: UTC+3:30 (IRST)

Su Sara (Persian: سوسرا) (Note: Also romanized as Sū Sarā; also known as Sū Sarāb) is a village in Khormarud-e Jonubi Rural District (Note: Formerly Khormarud Rural District) of Cheshmeh Saran District in Azadshahr County, Golestan province, Iran.

== Demographics ==
=== Population ===
At the time of the 2006 National Census, the village's population was 929 in 226 households. The following census in 2011 counted 1,046 people in 286 households. The 2016 census measured the population of the village as 1,100 people in 340 households. It was the most populous village in its rural district.
