= Sherkat-e Sahra =

Village in Golestan province, Iran

Sherkat-e Sahra Persian: شركت صحرا
- Village
- Location within Iran
- Coordinates: 37°15′40″N 55°21′15″E
- Country: Iran
- Province: Golestan
- County: Minudasht
- District: Central
- Rural District: Chehel Chay

Population (2016)
  - Total: 541
- Time zone: UTC+3:30 (IRST)

Sherkat-e Sahra (Persian: شركت صحرا) (Note: Also romanized as Sherḵat-e Saḥrā) is a village in Chehel Chay Rural District of the Central District in Minudasht County, Golestan province, Iran.

== Demographics ==
=== Population ===
At the time of the 2006 National Census, the village's population was 456 in 105 households. The following census in 2011 counted 494 people in 109 households. The 2016 census measured the population of the village as 541 people in 131 households.
