= Abeh-ye Hajji Nabi Gol Cheshmeh =

Village in Golestan province, Iran

Abeh-ye Hajji Nabi Gol Cheshmeh Persian: ابه حاجی نبی گل چشمه
- Village
- Location within Iran
- Coordinates: 37°06′48″N 55°07′19″E
- Country: Iran
- Province: Golestan
- County: Azadshahr
- District: Central
- Rural District: Nezamabad

Population (2016)
  - Total: 1,046
- Time zone: UTC+3:30 (IRST)

Abeh-ye Hajji Nabi Gol Cheshmeh (Persian: ابه حاجی نبی گل چشمه) (Note: Also romanized as Ābeh-ye Ḩājjī Nabī Gol Cheshmeh; also known as Gol Cheshmeh and Gol Cheshmeh-ye Ḩājjī Nabī) is a village in Nezamabad Rural District of the Central District in Azadshahr County, Golestan province, Iran.

== Demographics ==
=== Population ===
At the time of the 2006 National Census, the village's population was 1,278 in 292 households. The following census in 2011 counted 1,152 people in 295 households. The 2016 census measured the population of the village as 1,046 people in 274 households.
