= Aqcheli-ye Olya =

Aqcheli-ye Olya آقچلی عليا
- Village
- Location within Iran
- Coordinates: 37°10′45″N 55°09′19″E
- Country: Iran
- Province: Golestan
- County: Azadshahr
- Bakhsh: Central
- Rural District: Nezamabad

Population (2016)
  - Total: 371
- Time zone: UTC+3:30 (IRST)

Aqcheli-ye Olya (Persian: آقچلی عليا, also Romanized as Āqchelī-ye ‘Olyā) is a village in Nezamabad Rural District, in the Central District of Azadshahr County, Golestan Province, Iran. At the 2006 census, its population was 383, in 93 families. In 2016, its population was 371, in 103 households.
