= Pas Poshteh =

Pas Poshteh (Persian: پس پشته) may refer to:

- Pas Poshteh, Golestan
- Pas Poshteh, Razavi Khorasan
