= Dowzeyn =

City in Golestan province, Iran

Dowzeyn Persian: دوزين
- City
- Location within Iran
- Coordinates: 37°07′35″N 55°34′51″E
- Country: Iran
- Province: Golestan
- County: Minudasht
- District: Kuhsarat
- Established as a city: 2018

Population (2016)
  - Total: 5,737
- Time zone: UTC+3:30 (IRST)

Dowzeyn (Persian: دوزين) (Note: Also known as Dozeyn and Dozīn) is a city in, and the capital of, Kuhsarat District in Minudasht County, Golestan province, Iran. As a village, it was the capital of Kuhsarat Rural District (Note: Renamed Garu Rural District) until its capital was transferred to the village of Safiabad.

== Demographics ==
=== Population ===
At the time of the 2006 National Census, Dowzeyn's population was 4,971 in 1,046 households, when it was a village in Kuhsarat Rural District of the Central District. The following census in 2011 counted 5,785 people in 1,484 households, by which time the rural district had been separated from the district in the formation of Kuhsarat District and its name was changed to Garu Rural District. The 2016 census measured the population of the village as 5,737 people in 1,681 households. It was the most populous village in its rural district.

The village of Dowzeyn was converted to a city in 2018.
