= Araz Taqan =

Araz Taqan ارازتقان
- Village
- Location within Iran
- Coordinates: 37°07′01″N 55°09′51″E
- Country: Iran
- Province: Golestan
- County: Azadshahr
- Bakhsh: Central
- Rural District: Nezamabad

Population (2016)
  - Total: 478
- Time zone: UTC+3:30 (IRST)

Araz Taqan (Persian: ارازتقان, also Romanized as Arāz Taqān and Ārāz Taqān) is a village in Nezamabad Rural District, in the Central District of Azadshahr County, Golestan Province, Iran. At the 2006 census, its population was 484, in 96 families. In 2016, its population was 478, in 138 households..
