= Qeshlaq, Golestan =

Village in Golestan province, Iran

Qeshlaq Persian: قشلاق
- Village
- Location within Iran
- Coordinates: 36°54′43″N 55°19′05″E
- Country: Iran
- Province: Golestan
- County: Azadshahr
- District: Cheshmeh Saran
- Rural District: Cheshmeh Saran

Population (2016)
  - Total: 69
- Time zone: UTC+3:30 (IRST)

Qeshlaq (Persian: قشلاق) (Note: Also romanized as Qeshlāq) is a village in Cheshmeh Saran Rural District of Cheshmeh Saran District in Azadshahr County, Golestan province, Iran.

== Demographics ==
=== Population ===
At the time of the 2006 National Census, the village's population was 124 in 39 households. The following census in 2011 counted 80 people in 28 households. The 2016 census measured the population of the village as 69 people in 26 households.
