= Khvosh Yeylaq =

Village in Golestan province, Iran

Khvosh Yeylaq Persian: خوش ييلاق
- Village
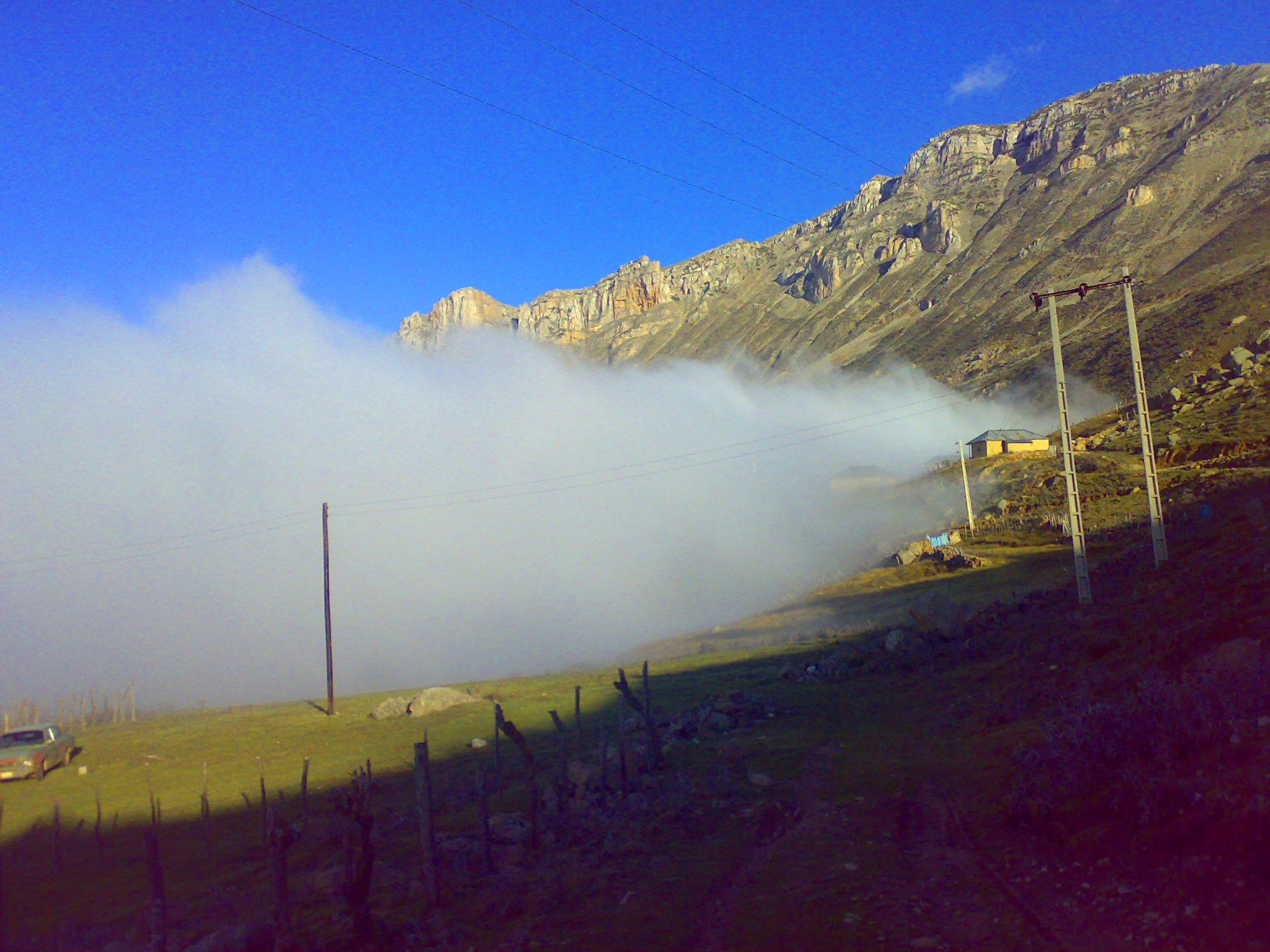
- Khvosh Yeylaq pass in fog

- Location within Iran
- Coordinates: 36°50′58″N 55°21′08″E
- Country: Iran
- Province: Golestan
- County: Azadshahr
- District: Cheshmeh Saran
- Rural District: Cheshmeh Saran

Population (2016)
  - Total: 228
- Time zone: UTC+3:30 (IRST)

Khvosh Yeylaq (Persian: خوش ييلاق) (Note: Also romanized as Khowsh Yeylāq, Khowsh-e Yeylāq, and Khvosh Yeylāq; also known as Khāsh Āylān and Khosh Yeylāq) is a mountainous village in Cheshmeh Saran Rural District of Cheshmeh Saran District in Azadshahr County, Golestan province, Iran.

== Demographics ==
=== Population ===
At the time of the 2006 National Census, the village's population was 362 in 92 households. The following census in 2011 counted 230 people in 77 households. The 2016 census measured the population of the village as 228 people in 75 households.
