= Pashmak-e Towq Tamish =

Village in Golestan province, Iran

Pashmak-e Towq Tamish Persian: پشمک طوق تميش
- Village
- Location within Iran
- Coordinates: 37°09′52″N 55°11′47″E
- Country: Iran
- Province: Golestan
- County: Azadshahr
- District: Central
- Rural District: Nezamabad

Population (2016)
  - Total: 625
- Time zone: UTC+3:30 (IRST)

Pashmak-e Towq Tamish (Persian: پشمک طوق تميش) (Note: Also romanized as Pashmak-e Ţowq Tamīsh; also known as Pashmak and Pashmak-e Ţowq Tamesh) is a village in Nezamabad Rural District of the Central District in Azadshahr County, Golestan province, Iran.

== Demographics ==
=== Population ===
At the time of the 2006 National Census, the village's population was 477 in 104 households. The following census in 2011 counted 523 people in 148 households. The 2016 census measured the population of the village as 625 people in 192 households.
