= Now Deh Khanduz =

City in Golestan province, Iran

Now Deh Khanduz Persian: نوده خاندوز
- City
- Location within Iran
- Coordinates: 37°04′35″N 55°15′48″E
- Country: Iran
- Province: Golestan
- County: Azadshahr
- District: Cheshmeh Saran
- Established as a city: 2003

Population (2016)
  - Total: 2,989
- Time zone: UTC+3:30 (IRST)

Now Deh Khanduz (Persian: نوده خاندوز) (Note: Also romanized as Now Deh Khān Dūz and Now Deh Khāndūz) is a city in, and the capital of, Cheshmeh Saran District in Azadshahr County, Golestan province, Iran. It also serves as the administrative center for Khormarud-e Jonubi Rural District. (Note: Formerly Khormarud Rural District)

== Geography ==
Now Deh Khanduz is on Road 83, 5 km (3.1 mi) south of Azadshahr. The village was converted to a city in 2003 and consists of the three neighborhoods of Now Deh Khanduz, Hajjilar (or Now Deh-e Hajjilar) and Emam Reza Township.

The mountains of the Eastern Alborz range are near the city, with narcissus flowers growing on their slopes, making the city famous as "The City of the Narcissus Flower." The main natural sight of the area is Shabnam Forest Park.

== Demographics ==
=== Population ===
At the time of the 2006 National Census, the city's population was 2,095 in 562 households. The following census in 2011 counted 3,032 people in 915 households. The 2016 census measured the population of the city as 2,989 people in 959 households.
