= Tilabad =

Village in Golestan province, Iran

Tilabad Persian: تيل آباد
- Village
- Location within Iran
- Coordinates: 36°54′40″N 55°28′08″E
- Country: Iran
- Province: Golestan
- County: Azadshahr
- District: Cheshmeh Saran
- Rural District: Cheshmeh Saran

Population (2016)
  - Total: 739
- Time zone: UTC+3:30 (IRST)

Tilabad (Persian: تيل آباد) (Note: Also romanized as Tīlābād) is a village in Cheshmeh Saran Rural District of Cheshmeh Saran District in Azadshahr County, Golestan province, Iran.

== Demographics ==
=== Population ===
At the time of the 2006 National Census, the village's population was 585 in 142 households. The following census in 2011 counted 325 people in 104 households. The 2016 census measured the population of the village as 739 people in 232 households.

In 2019, the village of Mohammad Aliabad merged with Tilabad.
