= Farsian, Azadshahr =

Village in Golestan province, Iran

Farsian Persian: فارسيان
- Village
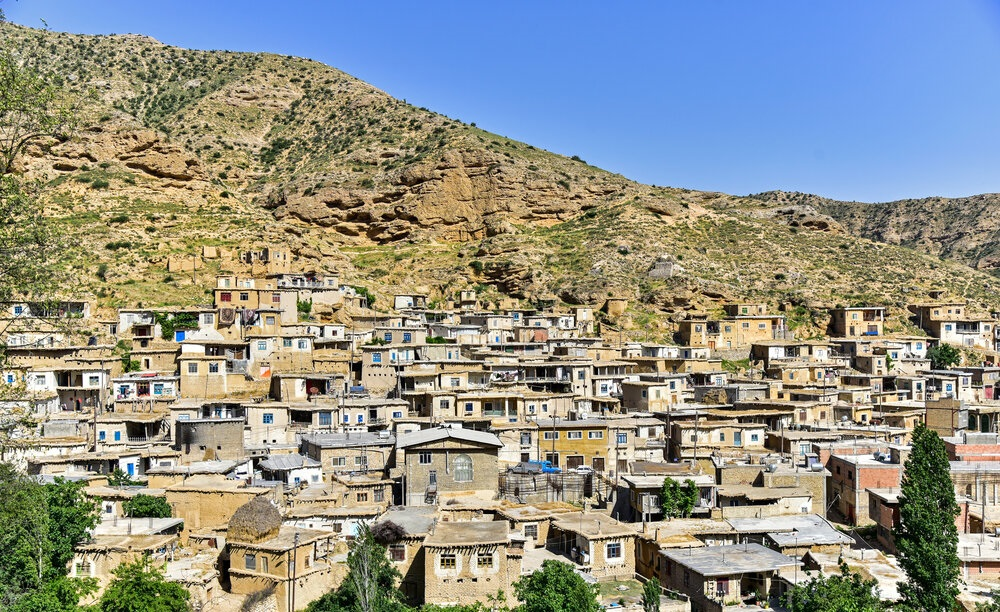
- Farsian

- Location within Iran
- Coordinates: 36°56′42″N 55°25′12″E
- Country: Iran
- Province: Golestan
- County: Azadshahr
- District: Cheshmeh Saran
- Rural District: Cheshmeh Saran

Population (2016)
  - Total: 1,928
- Time zone: UTC+3:30 (IRST)

Farsian (Persian: فارسيان) (Note: Also romanized as Fārseyān, Fārsīān, and Fārsīyān) is a mountainous village in, and the capital of, Cheshmeh Saran Rural District of Cheshmeh Saran District in Azadshahr County, Golestan province, Iran.

== Demographics ==
=== Population ===
At the time of the 2006 National Census, the village's population was 2,058 in 491 households. The following census in 2011 counted 2,109 people in 612 households. The 2016 census measured the population of the village as 1,928 people in 592 households.

== Tourism ==
Farsian, with a river running through it, is one of the historical villages and a tourist destination that has become famous as the "Masouleh of Golestan" because of its staircase-like houses. The inhabitants of Farsian are Turks of Qizilbash and their activities are agriculture and animal husbandry. Although the traditional look of the village has been destroyed over time, it has been restored by the government. The mud-thatched houses, wooden doors, and blue windows are attractive to tourists. People of Farsian produced handicrafts and traditional foods, but the village has been in decline due to a decline in tourists.
