= Aqcheli-ye Qerkhlar =

Aqcheli-ye Qerkhlar آقچلی قرخلر
- Village
- Location within Iran
- Coordinates: 37°09′40″N 55°07′04″E
- Country: Iran
- Province: Golestan
- County: Azadshahr
- Bakhsh: Central
- Rural District: Nezamabad

Population (2016)
  - Total: 258
- Time zone: UTC+3:30 (IRST)

Aqcheli-ye Qerkhlar (Persian: آقچلی قرخلر, also Romanized as Āqchelī-ye Qerkhlar) is a village in Nezamabad Rural District, in the Central District of Azadshahr County, Golestan Province, Iran. At the 2016 census, its population was 258, in 75 families. Up from 246 in 2006.
