= Narges Chal =

Village in Golestan province, Iran

Narges Chal Persian: نرگس چال
- Village
- Location within Iran
- Coordinates: 36°57′26″N 55°18′15″E
- Country: Iran
- Province: Golestan
- County: Azadshahr
- District: Cheshmeh Saran
- Rural District: Cheshmeh Saran

Population (2016)
  - Total: 112
- Time zone: UTC+3:30 (IRST)

Narges Chal (Persian: نرگس چال) (Note: Also romanized as Narges Chāl) is a village in Cheshmeh Saran Rural District of Cheshmeh Saran District in Azadshahr County, Golestan province, Iran.

== Demographics ==
=== Population ===
At the time of the 2006 National Census, the village's population was 139 in 41 households. The following census in 2011 counted 117 people in 40 households. The 2016 census measured the population of the village as 112 people in 38 households.
