= Saier =

Saier may refer to:

- Vic Saier (1891–1967), American baseball player
- Saier, Iran, a village in Golestan Province
