= Alqajar =

City in Golestan province, Iran

Alqajar Persian: القجر
- City
- Location within Iran
- Coordinates: 37°12′39″N 55°20′44″E
- Country: Iran
- Province: Golestan
- County: Minudasht
- District: Central
- Established as a city: 2023

Population (2016)
  - Total: 4,780
- Time zone: UTC+3:30 (IRST)

Alqajar (Persian: القجر) is a city in the Central District of Minudasht County, Golestan province, Iran. The city is on the foothills of the Eastern Alborz range, less than 5km southwest of the city of Minudasht.

As a village, it was the capital of Chehel Chay Rural District until its capital was transferred to the village of Qalami.

== Demographics ==
=== Population ===
At the time of the 2006 National Census, Alqajar's population was 3,910 in 991 households, when it was a village in Chehel Chay Rural District. The following census in 2011 counted 4,893 people in 1,350 households. The 2016 census measured the population of the village as 4,780 people in 1,428 households. It was the most populous village in its rural district.

The village of Alqajar was converted to a city in 2023.
