= Road 18 (Iran) =

Road in Iran

Road 18
- جاده 18

Route information
- Length: 462 km (287 mi)

Major junctions
- From: Maravehtapeh, Golestan
- Road 83; Road 73; Road 22; Road 79
- To: Mahmudabad, Mazandaran; Road 22

Location
- Country: Iran
- Provinces: Golestan, Mazandaran
- Major cities: Kalaleh, Golestan; Gonbad-e Qabus, Golestan; Aqqala, Golestan; Bandar Torkaman, Golestan; Bandar-e-Gaz, Golestan; Galugah, Mazandaran; Behshahr, Mazandaran; Neka, Mazandaran; Amirabad, Mazandaran; Bahnemir, Mazandaran; Babolsar, Mazandaran; Fereydunkenar, Mazandaran; Mahmudabad, Mazandaran

Highway system
- Highways in Iran; Freeways

Road 18 is a road in northern Iran in Golestan Province and Mazandaran Province. In Golestan it connects Maravehtapeh to Kalaleh, Gonbad-e Qabus, Bandar Torkaman and Bandar-e-Gaz. In Mazandaran, it runs concurrent with Road 22 until Neka, where it turns towards Caspian Sea coastline and runs parallel to it going through Babolsar, Fereydunkenar and ends at Mahmudabad
