= Khormarud-e Jonubi Rural District =

Rural district in Golestan province, Iran

Khormarud-e Jonubi Rural District Persian: دهستان خرمارود جنوبی
- Rural District
- Location within Iran
- Coordinates: 37°03′N 55°19′E
- Country: Iran
- Province: Golestan
- County: Azadshahr
- District: Cheshmeh Saran
- Established: 1987
- Capital: Now Deh Khanduz

Population (2016)
  - Total: 2,485
- Time zone: UTC+3:30 (IRST)

Khormarud-e Jonubi Rural District (Persian: دهستان خرمارود جنوبی) (Note: Formerly Khormarud Rural District (دهستان خرمارود)) is in Cheshmeh Saran District of Azadshahr County, Golestan province, Iran. It is administered from the city of Now Deh Khanduz.

== Demographics ==
=== Population ===
At the time of the 2006 National Census, the rural district's population was 3,003 in 758 households. There were 2,584 inhabitants in 661 households at the following census of 2011. The 2016 census measured the population of the rural district as 2,485 in 778 households. The most populous of its nine settlements was Su Sara, with 1,100 people.

As of 2016, the rural district included four populated villages, three villages with no permanent households, an army base, and a coal mine.

=== Other villages in the rural district ===
- Now Deh Garrison
- Saray Mohammad Hoseyn
- Vatan
