= Chehel Chay Rural District =

Rural district in Golestan province, Iran

Chehel Chay Rural District Persian: دهستان چهل چائ
- Rural District
- Location within Iran
- Coordinates: 37°09′N 55°21′E
- Country: Iran
- Province: Golestan
- County: Minudasht
- District: Central
- Established: 1987
- Capital: Qalami

Population (2016)
  - Total: 25,565
- Time zone: UTC+3:30 (IRST)

Chehel Chay Rural District (Persian: دهستان چهل چائ) is in the Central District of Minudasht County, Golestan province, Iran. Its capital is the village of Qalami. The previous capital of the rural district was the village of Alqajar, now a city.

== Demographics ==
=== Population ===
At the time of the 2006 National Census, the rural district's population was 23,978 in 6,003 households. There were 26,392 inhabitants in 7,425 households at the following census of 2011. The 2016 census measured the population of the rural district as 25,565 in 7,789 households. The most populous of its 40 villages was Alqajar (now a city), with 4,780 people.

=== Other villages in the rural district ===
- Abbasabad-e Amelak
- Baz Gir
- Dasht Halqeh
- Guggol
- Hasan Khan
- Kalu Kand
- Koveyt Mahalleh
- Mohammad Zaman Khan
- Mohammadabad
- Parsah Su
- Pas Poshteh
- Qarah Cheshmeh
- Sherkat-e Sahra
- Takht
