= Road 22 (Iran) =

Road in Iran

Road 22
- جاده 22
- North Coast Expressway بزرگراه کناره شمال
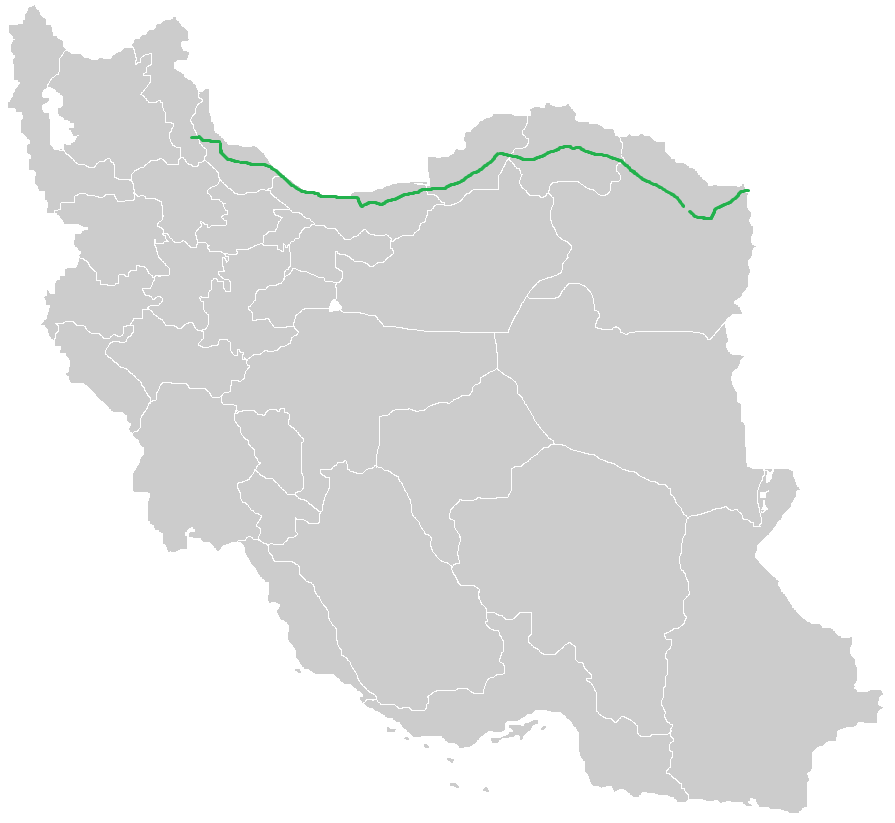

Route information
- Part of AH70 AH75
- Length: 1,405 km (873 mi)

Major junctions
- From: Sarakhs, Razavi Khorasan; Turkmenistan Border
- Freeway 2; Basij Expressway; Hemmat Expressway; Road 875; Road 87; Road 18; Road 83; Road 73; Road 18; Road 81; Road 79; Road 799; Road 795; Road 77; Road 18; Road 59; Freeway 3 (Tehran-Shomal Freeway); Road 593; Road 222; Road 494; Road 497; Road 49; Road 349; Road 256; Road 313; Road 494; Road 493; Road 319
- To: Khalkhal, Ardabil; Road 31

Location
- Country: Iran
- Provinces: Razavi Khorasan, North Khorasan, Golestan, Mazandaran, Gilan, Ardabil
- Major cities: Mashhad, Razavi Khorasan; Bojnord, North Khorasan; Gorgan, Golestan; Sari, Mazandaran; Chaloos, Mazandaran; Rasht, Gilan

Highway system
- Highways in Iran; Freeways

Road 22 is in northern Iran. It connects Sarakhs at the border with Turkmenistan to Mashhad, then to Gorgan, and afterwards it runs parallel to the Caspian Sea. Most parts of this road are expressways but some of them are in the Golestan Jungle.

== Plans ==
=== Langrud Bypass ===
A bypass in Langrud, Gilan with a length of 11 km is under construction. Once completed, it will be incorporated as part of this route.

=== Nur and Royan Bypass ===
A bypass around Nur and Royan, Mazandaran Province with plans to be extended to bypass Izadshahr as well is under construction. The length is to be 35km. Once completed, it will be incorporated as part of this route.

=== Mahmudabad Bypass ===
A bypass in Mahmudabad, Mazandaran with a length of 12.6 km is under construction. Once completed, 6 km of it will be incorporated as part of this route.

=== Babol Southern Bypass ===
Babol Southern Bypass Expressway in Babol, Mazandaran with a length of 16 km is under construction. Once completed, it will be incorporated as part of this route.

=== Twinning plans ===
There is an ongoing construction project to twin the section in between Gorgan-Bojnurd with a total length of 300 km. Some parts of it are already operational.

== Gallery ==
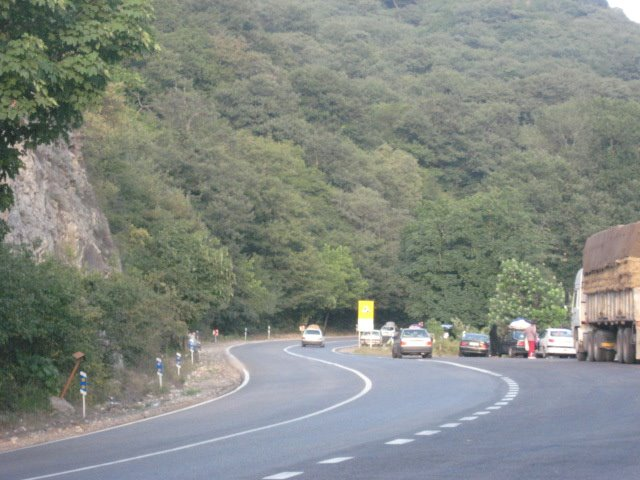
Golestan Jungle in east Golestan and Road 22

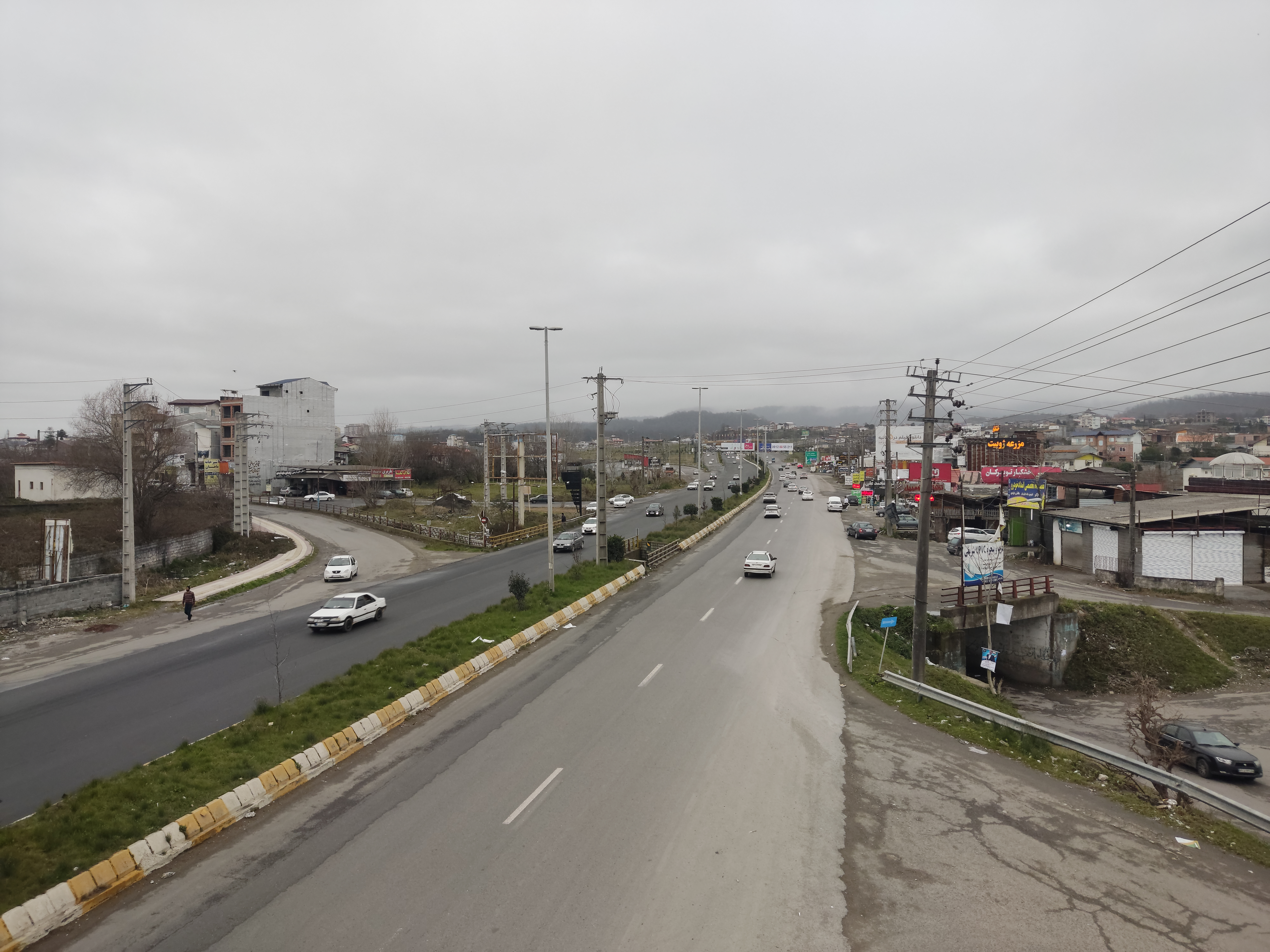
Road 22 in Chalus
