= Cheshmeh Saran Rural District =

Rural district in Golestan province, Iran

Cheshmeh Saran Rural District Persian: دهستان چشمه ‌ساران
- Rural District
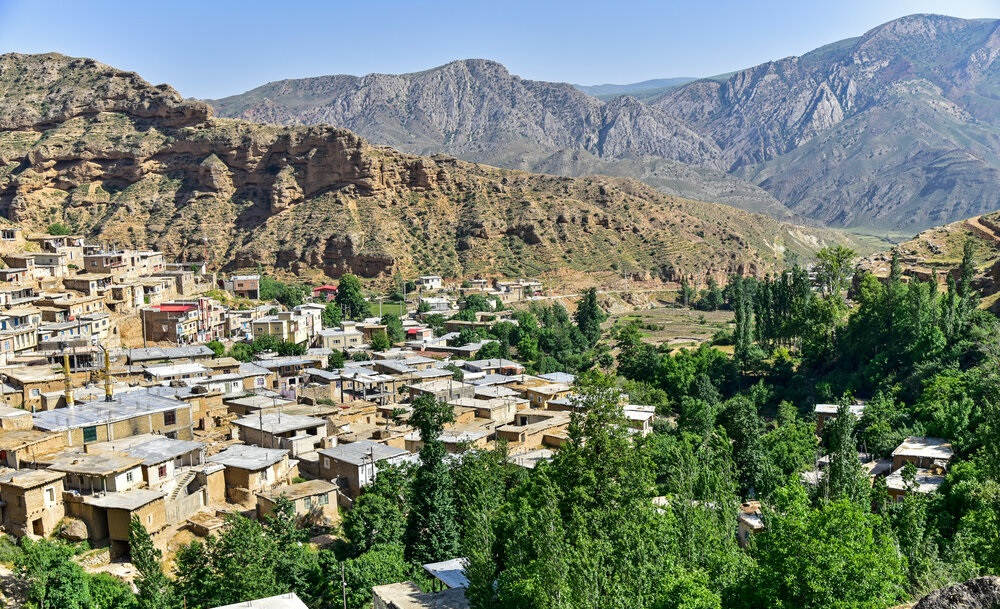
- The village of Farsian

- Location within Iran
- Coordinates: 36°56′N 55°26′E
- Country: Iran
- Province: Golestan
- County: Azadshahr
- District: Cheshmeh Saran
- Established: 1987
- Capital: Farsian

Population (2016)
  - Total: 9,808
- Time zone: UTC+3:30 (IRST)

Cheshmeh Saran Rural District (Persian: دهستان چشمه ‌ساران) is in Cheshmeh Saran District of Azadshahr County, Golestan province, Iran. Its capital is the village of Farsian.

== Demographics ==
=== Population ===
At the time of the 2006 National Census, the rural district's population was 10,550 in 2,577 households. There were 9,908 inhabitants in 2,985 households at the following census of 2011. The 2016 census measured the population of the rural district as 9,808 in 3,100 households. The most populous of its 20 villages was Narrab, with 2,187 people.

=== Other villages in the rural district ===
- Eslamabad-e Qeshlaq
- Ghaznavi
- Hajjiabad
- Jahadabad
- Kashidar
- Khvosh Yeylaq
- Masumabad
- Mehdiabad
- Narges Chal
- Qahveh Khaneh-ye Cheshmeh Bahar
- Qeshlaq
- Rahimabad
- Rudbar
- Sib Chal
- Tilabad
- Vamenan
