= Gol Cheshmeh, Qazvin =

Gol Cheshmeh گل چشمه
- Village
- Country: Iran
- Province: Qazvin
- County: Avaj
- Bakhsh: Central
- Rural District: Shahidabad

Population (2006)
  - Total: 114
- Time zone: UTC+3:30 (IRST)

Gol Cheshmeh (Persian: گل چشمه) is a village in Shahidabad Rural District, Central District, Avaj County, Qazvin Province, Iran. At the 2006 census, its population was 114, in 31 families.
