= Sherkat Chah =

Sherkat Chah شركت چاه
- Village
- Location within Iran
- Coordinates: 31°04′52″N 61°43′20″E
- Country: Iran
- Province: Sistan and Baluchestan
- County: Hirmand
- Bakhsh: Central
- Rural District: Margan

Population (2006)
  - Total: 153
- Time zone: UTC+3:30 (IRST)
  - Summer (DST): UTC+4:30 (IRDT)

Sherkat Chah (Persian: شركت چاه, also Romanized as Sherkat Chāh) is a village in Margan Rural District, in the Central District of Hirmand County, Sistan and Baluchestan Province, Iran. At the 2006 census, its population was 153, in 27 families.
