= Gol Cheshmeh, Golestan =

Gol Cheshmeh گل چشمه
- Village
- Country: Iran
- Province: Golestan
- County: Maraveh Tappeh
- Bakhsh: Golidagh
- Rural District: Golidagh

Population (2006)
  - Total: 97
- Time zone: UTC+3:30 (IRST)
  - Summer (DST): UTC+4:30 (IRDT)

Gol Cheshmeh (Persian: گل چشمه) is a village in Golidagh Rural District, Golidagh District, Maraveh Tappeh County, Golestan Province, Iran. At the 2006 census, its population was 97, in 15 families.
