= Chaman Jafar Beyg =

Chaman Jafar Beyg چمن جعفربيگ
- Village
- Location within Iran
- Coordinates: 34°20′55″N 47°44′50″E
- Country: Iran
- Province: Lorestan
- County: Delfan
- Bakhsh: Kakavand
- Rural District: Kakavand-e Sharqi

Population (2006)
  - Total: 56
- Time zone: UTC+3:30 (IRST)
  - Summer (DST): UTC+4:30 (IRDT)

Chaman Jafar Beyg (Persian: چمن جعفربيگ, also Romanized as Chaman Ja‘far Beyg and Chamanī-ye Ja‘far Beyk; also known as Chaman-e Ja‘far, Chaman-e Ja‘far Beyg-e Soflá, Chaman Ja‘far, and Chaman Ja‘far Beyg-e Pā’īn) is a village in Kakavand-e Sharqi Rural District, Kakavand District, Delfan County, Lorestan province, Iran. At the 2006 census, its population was 56, in 12 families.
