= Neginshahr =

City in Golestan province, Iran

Neginshahr Persian: نگين شهر
- City
- Location within Iran
- Coordinates: 37°08′18″N 55°09′49″E
- Country: Iran
- Province: Golestan
- County: Azadshahr
- District: Central
- Established as a city: 2004

Population (2016)
  - Total: 8,138
- Time zone: UTC+3:30 (IRST)

Neginshahr (Persian: نگين شهر) (Note: Formerly Nezamabad (نظام آباد),) is a city in the Central District of Azadshahr County, Golestan province, Iran, serving as the administrative center for Nezamabad Rural District. In 2004, the village of Nezamabad merged with the villages of Mami Zeytunli and Purjan to become the new city of Neginshahr.

== Demographics ==
=== Population ===
At the time of the 2006 National Census, the city's population was 7,639 in 1,765 households. The following census in 2011 counted 7,858 people in 2,076 households. The 2016 census measured the population of the city as 8,138 people in 2,344 households.
