= Nezamabad Rural District =

Rural district in Golestan province, Iran

Nezamabad Rural District Persian: دهستان نظام آباد
- Rural District
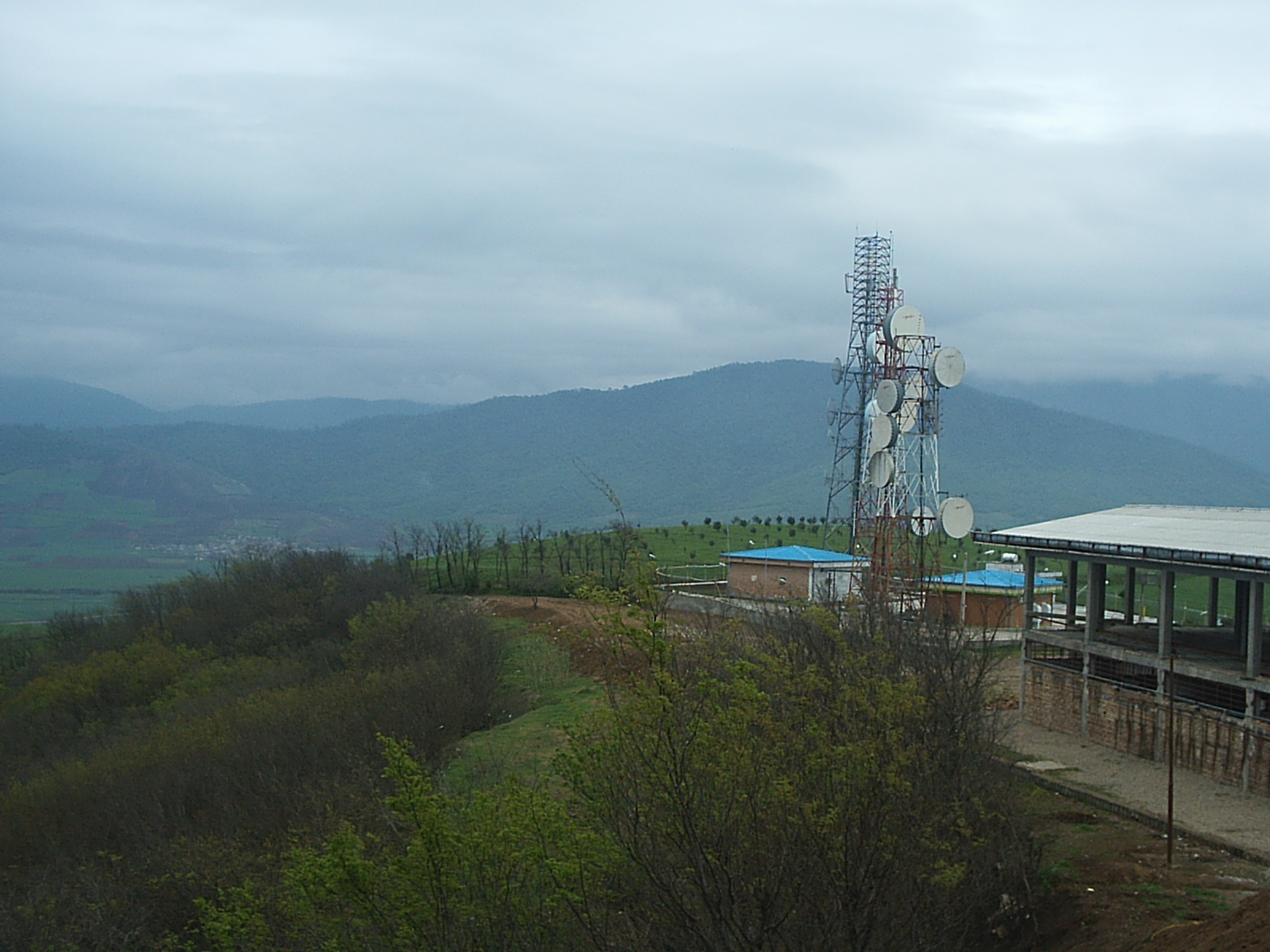

- Location within Iran
- Coordinates: 37°08′N 55°09′E
- Country: Iran
- Province: Golestan
- County: Azadshahr
- District: Central
- Established: 1987
- Capital: Neginshahr

Population (2016)
  - Total: 15,036
- Time zone: UTC+3:30 (IRST)

Nezamabad Rural District (Persian: دهستان نظام آباد) is in the Central District of Azadshahr County, Golestan province, Iran. It is administered from the city of Neginshahr. (Note: Formerly the village of Nezamabad)

== Demographics ==
=== Population ===
At the time of the 2006 National Census, the rural district's population was 14,899 in 3,442 households. There were 15,883 inhabitants in 4,033 households at the following census of 2011. The 2016 census measured the population of the rural district as 15,036 in 4,146 households. The most populous of its 21 villages was Qurchay, with 3,847 people.

=== Other villages in the rural district ===
- Abeh-ye Golha
- Abeh-ye Hajji Nabi Gol Cheshmeh
- Abeh-ye Sabzvariha
- Ahmadabad
- Aq Emam
- Aqcheli-ye Olya
- Aqcheli-ye Qerkhlar
- Araz Taqan
- Ata Behlakeh
- Bahram Sufi
- Mami Aqcheli
- Nazar Chaqli
- Pashmak-e Towq Tamish
- Qezeljeh-ye Aq Emam
- Satleq Bay-ye Zeytunli
- Tatar Bayjeq
