= Minudasht =

City in Golestan province, Iran

Minudasht Persian: مینودشت
- City
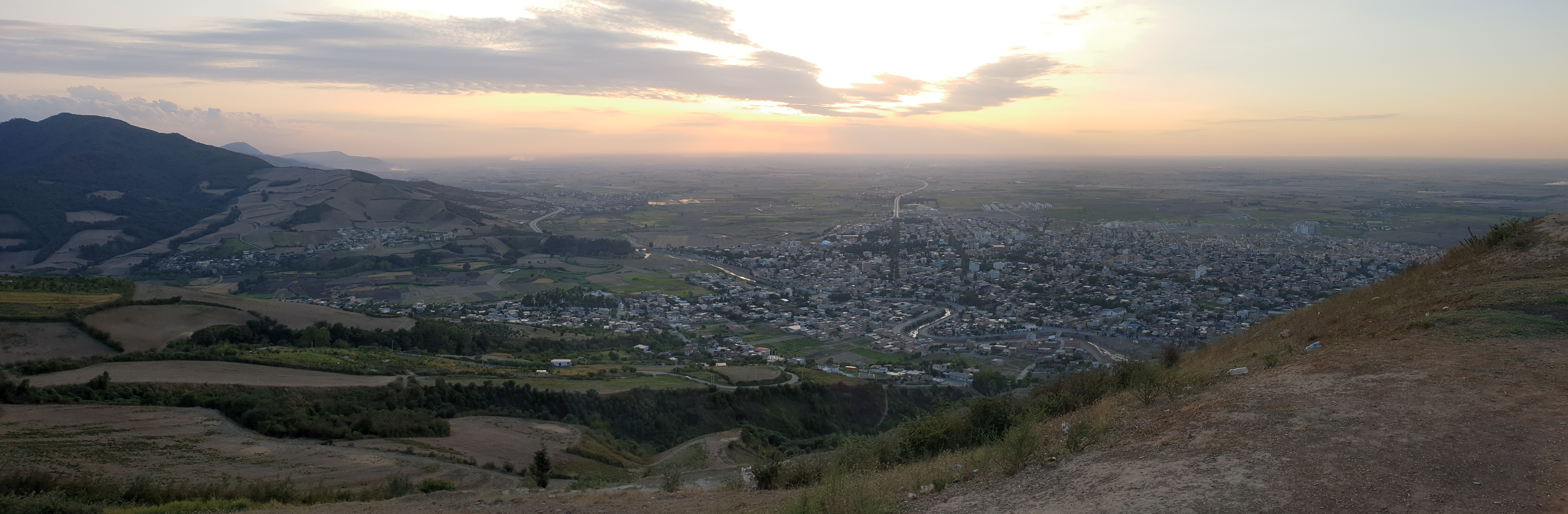
- Panorama of Minudasht

- Location within Iran
- Coordinates: 37°13′50″N 55°22′25″E
- Country: Iran
- Province: Golestan
- County: Minudasht
- District: Central

Population (2016)
  - Total: 30,085
- Time zone: UTC+3:30 (IRST)

Minudasht (Persian: مینودشت) (Note: Also romanized as Mīnū Dasht and Mīnūdasht) is a city in the Central District of Minudasht County, Golestan province, Iran, serving as capital of both the county and the district.

The climate is cool temperate.The average temperature is 15 °C. The warmest month is August, at 24 °C, and the coldest is January, at 4 °C. The average rainfall is 562 mm per year. The wettest month is April, at 86 mm of rain, and the driest is August, at 20 mm.

== Demographics ==
=== Population ===
At the time of the 2006 National Census, the city's population was 25,983 in 6,472 households. The following census in 2011 counted 28,478 people in 7,776 households. The 2016 census measured the population of the city as 30,085 people in 8,980 households.
