= Azadshahr =

City in Golestan Province, Iran

Azadshahr Persian: آزادشهر
- City
- Location within Iran
- Coordinates: 37°05′13″N 55°10′27″E
- Country: Iran
- Province: Golestan
- County: Azadshahr
- District: Central

Population (2016)
  - Total: 43,760
- Time zone: UTC+3:30 (IRST)

Azadshahr (Persian: آزادشهر) (Note: Also romanized as Āzād Shahr and Āzādshahr; formerly Shah Pasand (شاه پسند), also romanized as Shāh Pasand) is a city in the Central District of Azadshahr County, Golestan province, Iran, serving as capital of both the county and the district.

== Demographics ==
=== Population ===
At the time of the 2006 National Census, the city's population was 38,260 in 9,260 households. The following census in 2011 counted 39,484 people in 10,994 households. The 2016 census measured the population of the city as 43,760 people in 13,206 households.
