= Garu Rural District =

Rural district in Golestan province, Iran

Garu Rural District Persian: دهستان گرو
- Rural District
- Location within Iran
- Coordinates: 37°08′N 55°33′E
- Country: Iran
- Province: Golestan
- County: Minudasht
- District: Kuhsarat
- Established: 1987
- Capital: Safiabad

Population (2016)
  - Total: 11,025
- Time zone: UTC+3:30 (IRST)

Garu Rural District (Persian: دهستان گرو) (Note: Formerly Kuhsarat Rural District (دهستان كوهسارات)) is in Kuhsarat District of Minudasht County, Golestan province, Iran. Its capital is the village of Safiabad. The previous capital of the rural district was the village of Dozeyn, now a city.

== Demographics ==
=== Population ===
At the time of the 2006 census, the rural district's population (as Kuhsarat Rural District of the Central District) was 14,139 in 3,272 households. The following census in 2011 counted 11,081 people in 2,993 households, by which time the rural district had been separated from the district in the formation of Kuhsarat District and was renamed Garu Rural District. The 2016 census measured the population of the rural district as 11,025 in 3,266 households. The most populous of its 11 villages was Dowzeyn (now a city), with 5,737 people.

=== Other villages in the rural district ===
- Chamani-ye Bala
- Chamani-ye Pain
- Chamani-ye Vasat
- Deh Chenashk
- Narseh
- Parangal
- Tarseh
- Tashdeh
- Tuska Chal
