= Kuhsarat District =

District in Golestan province, Iran

Kuhsarat District Persian: بخش کوهسارات
- District
- Location within Iran
- Coordinates: 37°08′N 55°35′E
- Country: Iran
- Province: Golestan
- County: Minudasht
- Established: 2010
- Capital: Dowzeyn

Population (2016)
  - Total: 15,116
- Time zone: UTC+3:30 (IRST)

Kuhsarat District (Persian: بخش کوهسارات) is in Minudasht County, Golestan province, Iran. Its capital is the city of Dowzeyn.

== History ==
In 2010, Kuhsarat Rural District (Note: Renamed Garu Rural District) was separated from the Central District in the formation of Kuhsarat District. The village of Dowzeyn was converted to a city in 2018.

== Demographics ==
=== Population ===
At the time of the 2011 National Census, the district's population was 15,745 people in 4,264 households. The 2016 census measured the population of the district as 15,116 inhabitants in 4,524 households.

=== Administrative divisions ===
Kuhsarat District Population
Administrative Divisions	2011	2016
Garu RD (Note: Formerly Kuhsarat Rural District)	11,081	11,025
Sar Gol RD	4,664	4,091
Dowzeyn (city) (Note: Became a city after the 2016 census)		
Total	15,745	15,116
RD = Rural District
