= Central District (Azadshahr County) =

District in Golestan province, Iran

Central District (Azadshahr County) Persian: بخش مرکزی شهرستان آزادشهر
- District
- Location within Iran
- Coordinates: 37°05′N 55°10′E
- Country: Iran
- Province: Golestan
- County: Azadshahr
- Established: 2001
- Capital: Azadshahr

Population (2016)
  - Total: 81,520
- Time zone: UTC+3:30 (IRST)

The Central District of Azadshahr County (Persian: بخش مرکزی شهرستان آزادشهر) is in Golestan province, Iran. Its capital is the city of Azadshahr. (Note: Formerly Shah Pasand)

== Demographics ==
=== Population ===
At the time of the 2006 National Census, the district's population was 72,603 in 17,311 households. The following census in 2011 counted 76,241 people in 20,797 households. The 2016 census measured the population of the district as 81,520 inhabitants in 24,127 households.

=== Administrative divisions ===
Central District (Azadshahr County) Population
Administrative Divisions	2006	2011	2016
Khormarud-e Shomali RD	11,805	13,016	14,586
Nezamabad RD	14,899	15,883	15,036
Azadshahr (city)	38,260	39,484	43,760
Neginshahr (city) (Note: Formerly the village of Nezamabad)	7,639	7,858	8,138
Total	72,603	76,241	81,520
RD = Rural District
