= Cheshmeh Saran District =

District in Golestan province, Iran

Cheshmeh Saran District Persian: بخش چشمه ‌ساران
- District
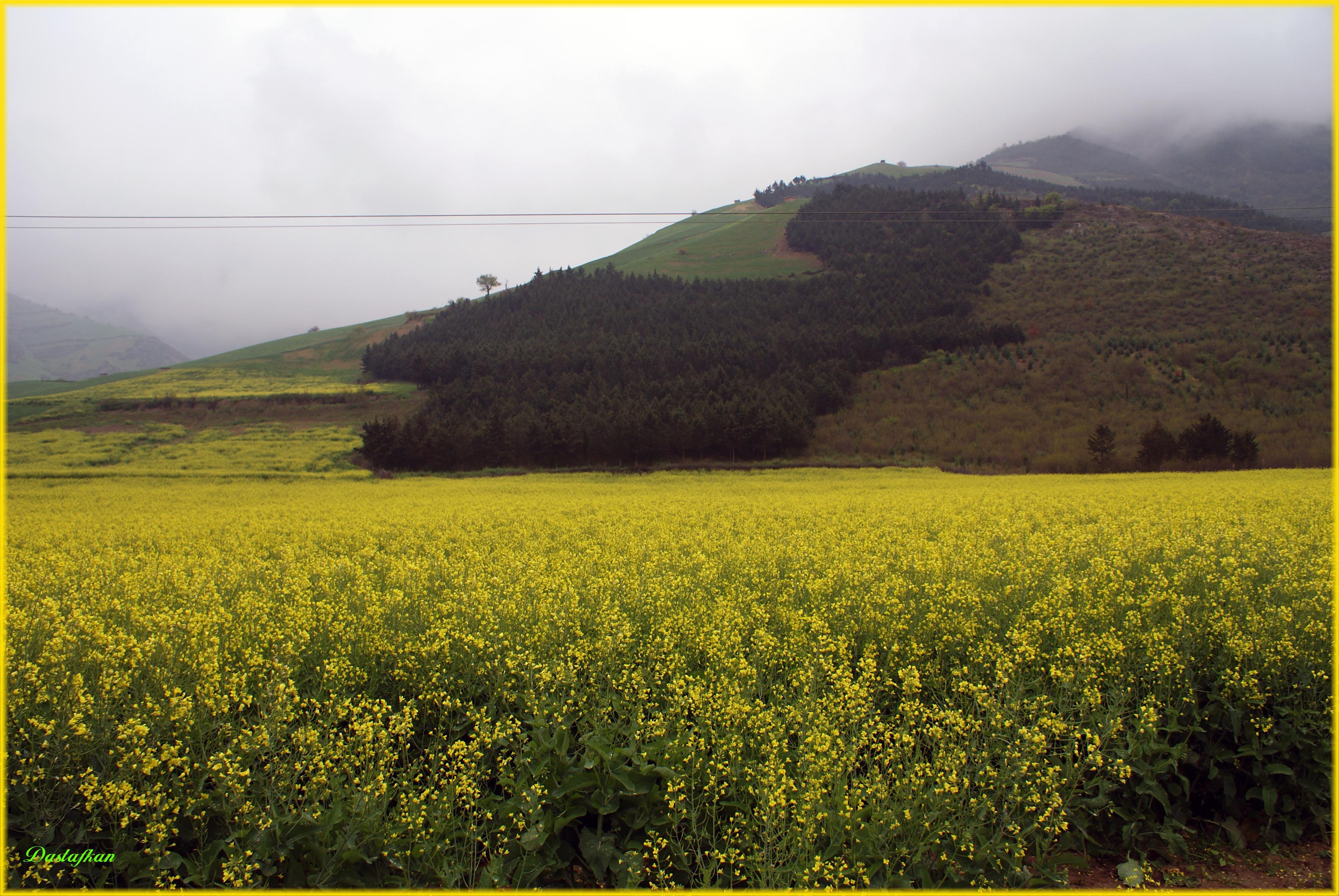
- Landscape in Cheshmeh Saran District

- Location within Iran
- Coordinates: 36°57′N 55°25′E
- Country: Iran
- Province: Golestan
- County: Azadshahr
- Established: 2001
- Capital: Now Deh Khanduz

Population (2016)
  - Total: 15,282
- Time zone: UTC+3:30 (IRST)

Cheshmeh Saran District (Persian: بخش چشمه‌ ساران) is in Azadshahr County, Golestan province, Iran. Its capital is the city of Now Deh Khanduz.

== Demographics ==
=== Population ===
At the time of the 2006 National Census, the district's population was 15,648 in 3,877 households. The following census in 2011 counted 15,524 people in 4,561 households. The 2016 census measured the population of the district as 15,282 inhabitants in 4,837 households.

=== Administrative divisions ===
Cheshmeh Saran District Population
Administrative Divisions	2006	2011	2016
Cheshmeh Saran RD	10,550	9,908	9,808
Khormarud-e Jonubi RD (Note: Formerly Khormarud Rural District)	3,003	2,584	2,485
Now Deh Khanduz (city)	2,095	3,032	2,989
Total	15,648	15,524	15,282
RD = Rural District
