= Minudasht County =

County in Golestan province, Iran

Minudasht County Persian: شهرستان مینودشت
- County
- Location of Minudasht County in Golestan province (center right, green)

- Location of Golestan province in Iran
- Coordinates: 37°09′N 55°28′E
- Country: Iran
- Province: Golestan
- Established: 1989
- Capital: Minudasht
- Districts: Central, Kuhsarat

Population (2016)
  - Total: 75,483
- Time zone: UTC+3:30 (IRST)

Minudasht County (Persian: شهرستان مینودشت) is in Golestan province, Iran. Its capital is the city of Minudasht.

== History ==
In 2010, Kuhsarat Rural District (Note: Renamed Garu Rural District) was separated from the Central District in the formation of Kuhsarat District, which was divided into Garu and Sar Gol Rural Districts. At the same time, Galikash District was separated from the county in the establishment of Galikash County.

The village of Dowzeyn was converted to a city in 2018, and the village of Alqajar became a city in 2023.

== Demographics ==
=== Population ===
At the time of the 2006 census, the county's population was 126,676, in 30,791 households. The following census in 2011 counted 75,659 people in 20,852 households. The 2016 census measured the population of the county as 75,483 in 22,719 households.

=== Administrative divisions ===
Minudasht County's population history and administrative structure over three consecutive censuses are shown in the following table.

Minudasht County Population
| Administrative Divisions | 2006 | 2011 | 2016 |
|---|---|---|---|
| Central District | 69,272 | 59,898 | 60,367 |
| Chehel Chay RD | 23,978 | 26,392 | 25,565 |
| Kuhsarat RD | 14,139 | | |
| Qaleh Qafeh RD | 5,172 | 5,028 | 4,717 |
| Alqajar (city) (Note: Became a city after the 2016 census) | | | |
| Minudasht (city) | 25,983 | 28,478 | 30,085 |
| Galikash District (Note: Transferred to Galikash County) | 57,404 | | |
| Nilkuh RD | 3,239 | | |
| Qaravolan RD | 16,202 | | |
| Yanqaq RD | 17,954 | | |
| Galikash (city) | 20,009 | | |
| Kuhsarat District | | 15,745 | 15,116 |
| Garu RD (Note: Formerly Kuhsarat Rural District) | | 11,081 | 11,025 |
| Sar Gol RD | | 4,664 | 4,091 |
| Dowzeyn (city) (Note: Became a city after the 2016 census) | | | |
| Total | 126,676 | 75,659 | 75,483 |
RD = Rural District

== See also ==
Media related to Minudasht County at Wikimedia Commons
