= Central District (Minudasht County) =

District in Golestan province, Iran

Central District (Minudasht County) Persian: بخش مرکزی شهرستان مینودشت
- District
- Location within Iran
- Coordinates: 37°09′N 55°23′E
- Country: Iran
- Province: Golestan
- County: Minudasht
- Established: 1989
- Capital: Minudasht

Population (2016)
  - Total: 60,367
- Time zone: UTC+3:30 (IRST)

The Central District of Minudasht County (Persian: بخش مرکزی شهرستان مینودشت) is in Golestan province, Iran. Its capital is the city of Minudasht.

== History ==
In 2010, Kuhsarat Rural District (Note: Renamed Garu Rural District) was separated from the district in the formation of Kuhsarat District. The village of Alqajar was converted to a city in 2023.

== Demographics ==
=== Population ===
At the time of the 2006 census, the district's population was 69,272 in 17,085 households. The following census in 2011 counted 59,898 people in 16,606 households. The 2016 census measured the population of the district as 60,367 inhabitants in 18,195 households.

=== Administrative divisions ===
Central District (Minudasht County) Population
Administrative Divisions	2006	2011	2016
Chehel Chay RD	23,978	26,392	25,565
Kuhsarat RD (Note: Transferred to Kuhsarat District and renamed Garu Rural District)	14,139		
Qaleh Qafeh RD	5,172	5,028	4,717
Alqajar (city) (Note: Became a city after the 2016 census)			
Minudasht (city)	25,983	28,478	30,085
Total	69,272	59,898	60,367
RD = Rural District
