= Azadshahr County =

County in Golestan Province, Iran

Azadshahr County Persian: شهرستان آزادشهر
- County
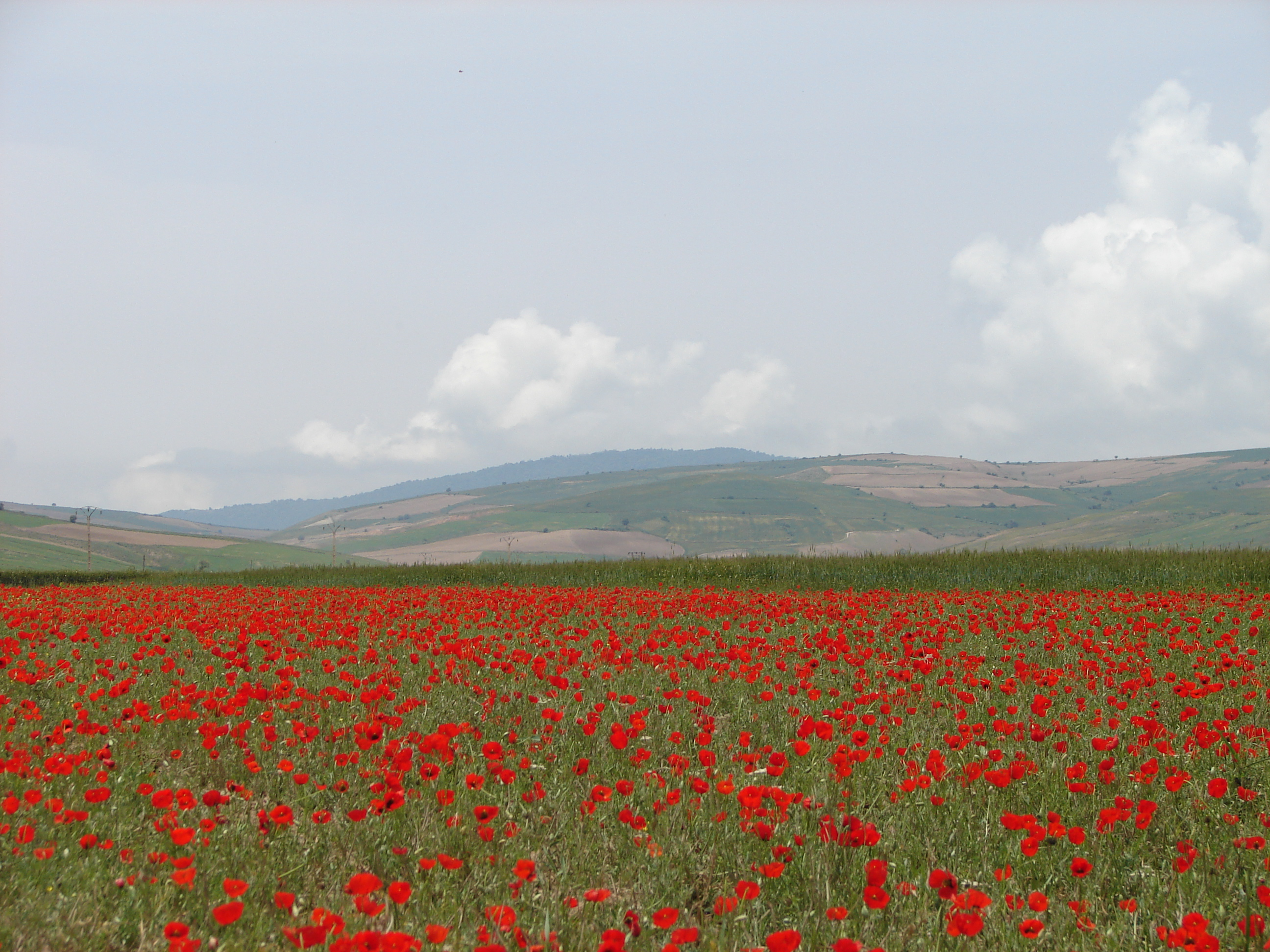
- Poppy-covered plain in Azadshahr County

- Location of Azadshahr County in Golestan Province (center right, pink)

- Location of Golestan Province in Iran
- Coordinates: 37°02′N 55°16′E
- Country: Iran
- Province: Golestan
- Established: 2001
- Capital: Azadshahr
- Districts: Central, Cheshmeh Saran

Population (2016)
  - Total: 96,803
- Time zone: UTC+3:30 (IRST)

Azadshahr County (Persian: شهرستان آزادشهر) is in Golestan Province, Iran. Its capital is the city of Azadshahr. (Note: Formerly Shah Pasand)

== Demographics ==
=== Population ===
At the time of the 2006 National Census, the county's population was 88,251 in 21,188 households. The following census in 2011 counted 91,767 people in 25,343 households. The 2016 census measured the population of the county as 96,803 in 28,965 households.

=== Administrative divisions ===
Azadshahr County's population history and administrative structure over three consecutive censuses are shown in the following table.

Azadshahr County Population
Administrative Divisions	2006	2011	2016
Central District	72,603	76,241	81,520
Khormarud-e Shomali RD	11,805	13,016	14,586
Nezamabad RD	14,899	15,883	15,036
Azadshahr (city)	38,260	39,484	43,760
Neginshahr (city) (Note: Formerly the village of Nezamabad)	7,639	7,858	8,138
Cheshmeh Saran District	15,648	15,524	15,282
Cheshmeh Saran RD	10,550	9,908	9,808
Khormarud-e Jonubi RD (Note: Formerly Khormarud Rural District)	3,003	2,584	2,485
Now Deh Khanduz (city)	2,095	3,032	2,989
Total	88,251	91,767	96,803
RD = Rural District

== See also ==
Media related to Azadshahr County at Wikimedia Commons
