= Tarajiq =

Village in Golestan province, Iran

Tarajiq Persian: تراجيق
- Village
- Location within Iran
- Coordinates: 37°18′29″N 55°28′57″E
- Country: Iran
- Province: Golestan
- County: Galikash
- District: Central
- Rural District: Yanqaq

Population (2016)
  - Total: 1,019
- Time zone: UTC+3:30 (IRST)

Tarajiq (Persian: تراجيق) (Note: Also romanized as Ţārājīq and Tārājīq) is a village in Yanqaq Rural District of the Central District in Galikash County, Golestan province, Iran.

== Demographics ==
=== Population ===
At the time of the 2006 National Census, the village's population was 983 in 256 households, when it was in Qaravolan Rural District of the former Galikash District in Minudasht County. The following census in 2011 counted 991 people in 287 households, by which time the district had been separated from the county in the establishment of Galikash County. The rural district was transferred to the new Loveh District and Tarajiq was transferred to Yanqaq Rural District in the new Central District. The 2016 census measured the population of the village as 1,019 people in 314 households.
