= Qusheh Cheshmeh =

Village in Golestan province, Iran

Qusheh Cheshmeh Persian: قوشه چشمه
- Village
- Location within Iran
- Coordinates: 37°27′00″N 55°43′00″E
- Country: Iran
- Province: Golestan
- County: Galikash
- District: Loveh
- Rural District: Golestan

Population (2016)
  - Total: 479
- Time zone: UTC+3:30 (IRST)

Qusheh Cheshmeh (Persian: قوشه چشمه) (Note: Also romanized as Qūsheh Cheshmeh; also known as Qūsh Cheshmeh) is a village in Golestan Rural District of Loveh District in Galikash County, Golestan province, Iran.

== Demographics ==
=== Population ===
At the time of the 2006 National Census, the village's population was 375 in 74 households, when it was in Qaravolan Rural District of the former Galikash District in Minudasht County. The following census in 2011 counted 428 people in 109 households, by which time the district had been separated from the county in the establishment of Galikash County. The rural district was transferred to the new Loveh District, and Qusheh Cheshmeh was transferred to Golestan Rural District created in the same district. The 2016 census measured the population of the village as 479 people in 127 households.
