= Gugol-e Bozorg =

Village in Golestan province, Iran

Gugol-e Bozorg Persian: گوگل بزرگ
- Village
- Location within Iran
- Coordinates: 37°23′13″N 55°42′23″E
- Country: Iran
- Province: Golestan
- County: Galikash
- District: Loveh
- Rural District: Golestan

Population (2016)
  - Total: 151
- Time zone: UTC+3:30 (IRST)

Gugol-e Bozorg (Persian: گوگل بزرگ) (Note: Also romanized as Gūgol-e Bozorg; also known as Gogol-e Bozorg) is a village in Golestan Rural District of Loveh District in Galikash County, Golestan province, Iran.

== Demographics ==
=== Population ===
At the time of the 2006 National Census, the village's population was 122 in 32 households, when it was in Qaravolan Rural District of the former Galikash District in Minudasht County. The following census in 2011 counted 134 people in 37 households, by which time the district had been separated from the county in the establishment of Galikash County. The rural district was transferred to the new Loveh District, and Gugol-e Bozorg was transferred to Golestan Rural District created in the same district. The 2016 census measured the population of the village as 151 people in 45 households.
