= Besh Evili, Galikash =

Village in Golestan province, Iran

Besh Evili Persian: بش اویلی
- Village
- Location within Iran
- Coordinates: 37°23′09″N 55°42′04″E
- Country: Iran
- Province: Golestan
- County: Galikash
- District: Loveh
- Rural District: Golestan

Population (2016)
  - Total: 495
- Time zone: UTC+3:30 (IRST)

Besh Evili (Persian: بش اویلی) (Note: Also romanized as Besh Evīlī; also known as Besh Evlī) is a village in Golestan Rural District of Loveh District in Galikash County, Golestan province, Iran.

== Demographics ==
=== Population ===
At the time of the 2006 National Census, the village's population was 429 in 129 households, when it was in Qaravolan Rural District of the former Galikash District in Minudasht County. The following census in 2011 counted 457 people in 123 households, by which time the district had been separated from the county in the establishment of Galikash County. The rural district was transferred to the new Loveh District, and Besh Evili was transferred to Golestan Rural District created in the same district. The 2016 census measured the population of the village as 495 people in 148 households.
