= Kondeskuh =

Village in Golestan province, Iran

Kondeskuh Persian: كندسكوه
- Village
- Location within Iran
- Coordinates: 37°18′28″N 55°46′02″E
- Country: Iran
- Province: Golestan
- County: Galikash
- District: Loveh
- Rural District: Golestan

Population (2016)
  - Total: 209
- Time zone: UTC+3:30 (IRST)

Kondeskuh (Persian: كندسكوه) (Note: Also romanized as Kondeskūh; also known as Kondeskū and Kondeshkūh) is a village in Golestan Rural District of Loveh District in Galikash County, Golestan province, Iran.

== Demographics ==
=== Population ===
At the time of the 2006 National Census, the village's population was 220 in 57 households, when it was in Qaravolan Rural District of the former Galikash District in Minudasht County. The following census in 2011 counted 186 people in 48 households, by which time the district had been separated from the county in the establishment of Galikash County. The rural district was transferred to the new Loveh District, and Kondeskuh was transferred to Golestan Rural District created in the same district. The 2016 census measured the population of the village as 209 people in 60 households.
