= Tarjanli =

Village in Golestan province, Iran

Tarjanli Persian: ترجنلی
- Village
- Location within Iran
- Coordinates: 37°23′45″N 55°45′31″E
- Country: Iran
- Province: Golestan
- County: Galikash
- District: Loveh
- Rural District: Golestan

Population (2016)
  - Total: 1,343
- Time zone: UTC+3:30 (IRST)

Tarjanli (Persian: ترجنلی) (Note: Also romanized as Tarjanlī) is a village in Golestan Rural District of Loveh District in Galikash County, Golestan province, Iran.

== Demographics ==
=== Population ===
At the time of the 2006 National Census, the village's population was 1,162 in 313 households, when it was in Qaravolan Rural District of the former Galikash District in Minudasht County. The following census in 2011 counted 1,308 people in 358 households, by which time the district had been separated from the county in the establishment of Galikash County. The rural district was transferred to the new Loveh District, and Tarjanli was transferred to Golestan Rural District created in the same district. The 2016 census measured the population of the village as 1,343 people in 407 households. It was the most populous village in its rural district.
