= Tangrah =

Village in Golestan province, Iran

Tangrah Persian: تنگ راه
- Village
- Location within Iran
- Coordinates: 37°23′47″N 55°46′55″E
- Country: Iran
- Province: Golestan
- County: Galikash
- District: Loveh
- Rural District: Golestan

Population (2016)
  - Total: 1,325
- Time zone: UTC+3:30 (IRST)

Tangrah (Persian: تنگ راه) (Note: Also romanized as Tang Rāh, Tang-e Rāh, Tang-i-Rāh, and Tangrāh; also known as Tangar) is a village in, and the capital of, Golestan Rural District in Loveh District of Galikash County, Golestan province, Iran.

== Demographics ==
=== Population ===
At the time of the 2006 National Census, the village's population was 1,078 in 292 households, when it was in Qaravolan Rural District of the former Galikash District in Minudasht County. The following census in 2011 counted 1,417 people in 370 households, by which time the district had been separated from the county in the establishment of Galikash County. The rural district was transferred to the new Loveh District, and Tangrah was transferred to Golestan Rural District created in the same district. The 2016 census measured the population of the village as 1,325 people in 351 households.
