= Qereq-e Aq Qamish =

Village in Golestan province, Iran

Qereq-e Aq Qamish Persian: قرق اق قميش
- Village
- Location within Iran
- Coordinates: 37°21′58″N 55°36′05″E
- Country: Iran
- Province: Golestan
- County: Galikash
- District: Loveh
- Rural District: Qaravolan

Population (2016)
  - Total: 317
- Time zone: UTC+3:30 (IRST)

Qereq-e Aq Qamish (Persian: قرق اق قميش) (Note: Also romanized as Qereq-e Āq Qamīsh; also known as Qereq) is a village in Qaravolan Rural District of Loveh District in Galikash County, Golestan province, Iran.

== Demographics ==
=== Population ===
At the time of the 2006 National Census, the village's population was 336 in 66 households, when it was in the former Galikash District of Minudasht County. The following census in 2011 counted 267 people in 67 households, by which time the district had been separated from the county in the establishment of Galikash County. The rural district was transferred to the new Loveh District. The 2016 census measured the population of the village as 317 people in 96 households.
