= Eslamabad, Galikash =

Village in Golestan province, Iran

Eslamabad Persian: اسلام آباد
- Village
- Location within Iran
- Coordinates: 37°15′45″N 55°25′06″E
- Country: Iran
- Province: Golestan
- County: Galikash
- District: Central
- Rural District: Yanqaq

Population (2016)
  - Total: 988
- Time zone: UTC+3:30 (IRST)

Eslamabad (Persian: اسلام آباد) (Note: Also romanized as Eslāmābād) is a village in Yanqaq Rural District of the Central District in Galikash County, Golestan province, Iran.

== Demographics ==
=== Population ===
The village did not appear in the 2006 National Census, when it was in the former Galikash District of Minudasht County. The following census in 2011 counted 85 people in 30 households, by which time the district had been separated from the county in the establishment of Galikash County. The rural district was transferred to the new Central District. The 2016 census measured the population of the village as 988 people in 313 households.
