= Loveh =

Village in Golestan province, Iran

Loveh Persian: لوه
- Village
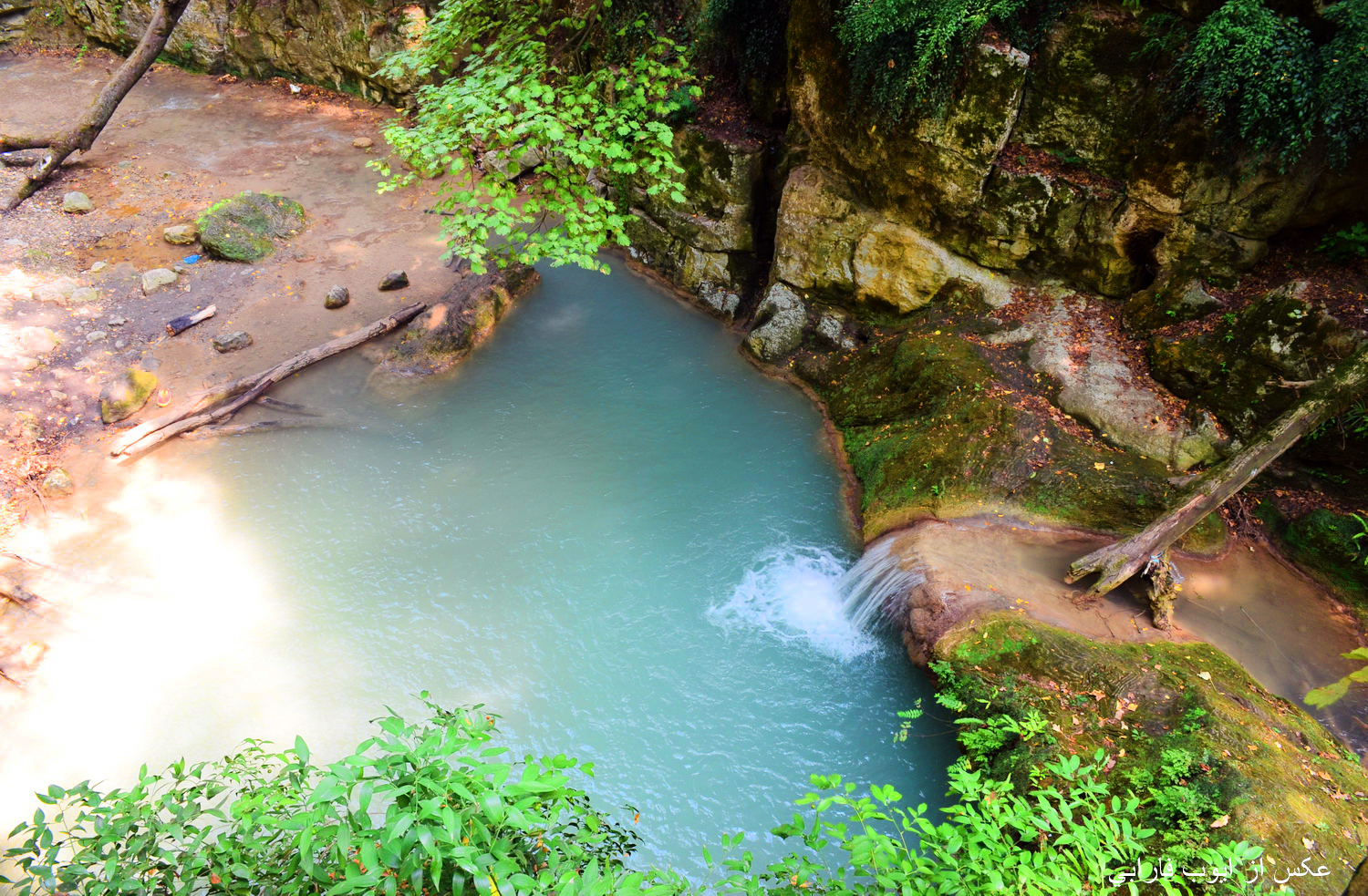
- Loveh Waterfall

- Location within Iran
- Coordinates: 37°21′41″N 55°39′23″E
- Country: Iran
- Province: Golestan
- County: Galikash
- District: Loveh
- Rural District: Qaravolan

Population (2016)
  - Total: 537
- Time zone: UTC+3:30 (IRST)

Loveh (Persian: لوه) is a village in Qaravolan Rural District of Loveh District in Galikash County, Golestan province, Iran.

== Demographics ==
=== Population ===
At the time of the 2006 National Census, the village's population was 593 in 150 households, when it was in the former Galikash District of Minudasht County. The following census in 2011 counted 568 people in 168 households, by which time the district had been separated from the county in the establishment of Galikash County. The rural district was transferred to the new Loveh District. The 2016 census measured the population of the village as 537 people in 174 households.
