= Ajan Qarah Khvajeh =

Village in Golestan province, Iran

Ajan Qarah Khvajeh Persian: اجن قره خوجه
- Village
- Location within Iran
- Coordinates: 37°21′21″N 55°32′41″E
- Country: Iran
- Province: Golestan
- County: Galikash
- District: Loveh
- Rural District: Qaravolan

Population (2016)
  - Total: 1,229
- Time zone: UTC+3:30 (IRST)

Ajan Qarah Khvajeh (Persian: اجن قره خوجه) (Note: Also romanized as Ajan Qarah Khvājeh and Ajan Qareh Khvājeh) is a village in Qaravolan Rural District of Loveh District in Galikash County, Golestan province, Iran.

== Demographics ==
=== Population ===
At the time of the 2006 National Census, the village's population was 938 in 225 households, when it was in the former Galikash District of Minudasht County. The following census in 2011 counted 1,158 people in 305 households, by which time the district had been separated from the county in the establishment of Galikash County. The rural district was transferred to the new Loveh District. The 2016 census measured the population of the village as 1,229 people in 339 households.
