= Esmailabad, Golestan =

Village in Golestan province, Iran

Esmailabad Persian: اسماعيل آباد
- Village
- Location within Iran
- Coordinates: 37°17′16″N 55°23′02″E
- Country: Iran
- Province: Golestan
- County: Galikash
- District: Central
- Rural District: Yanqaq

Population (2016)
  - Total: 606
- Time zone: UTC+3:30 (IRST)

Esmailabad (Persian: اسماعيل آباد) (Note: Also romanized as Esmā‘īlābād) is a village in Yanqaq Rural District of the Central District in Galikash County, Golestan province, Iran.

== Demographics ==
=== Population ===
At the time of the 2006 National Census, the village's population was 555 in 115 households, when it was in the former Galikash District of Minudasht County. The following census in 2011 counted 556 people in 153 households, by which time the district had been separated from the county in the establishment of Galikash County. The rural district was transferred to the new Central District. The 2016 census measured the population of the village as 606 people in 185 households.
