= Ab Paran =

Village in Golestan province, Iran

Ab Paran Persian: اب پران
- Village
- Location within Iran
- Coordinates: 37°15′03″N 55°29′19″E
- Country: Iran
- Province: Golestan
- County: Galikash
- District: Central
- Rural District: Nilkuh

Population (2016)
  - Total: 460
- Time zone: UTC+3:30 (IRST)

Ab Paran (Persian: اب پران) (Note: Also romanized as Āb Parān; also known as Ūporon) is a village in Nilkuh Rural District of the Central District in Galikash County, Golestan province, Iran.

== Demographics ==
=== Population ===
At the time of the 2006 National Census, the village's population was 421 in 88 households, when it was in the former Galikash District of Minudasht County. The following census in 2011 counted 427 people in 111 households, by which time the district had been separated from the county in the establishment of Galikash County. The rural district was transferred to the new Central District. The 2016 census measured the population of the village as 460 people in 138 households.
