= Arab Buran =

Village in Golestan province, Iran

Arab Buran Persian: عرب بوران
- Village
- Location within Iran
- Coordinates: 37°19′27″N 55°25′07″E
- Country: Iran
- Province: Golestan
- County: Galikash
- District: Central
- Rural District: Yanqaq

Population (2016)
  - Total: 926
- Time zone: UTC+3:30 (IRST)

Arab Buran (Persian: عرب بوران) (Note: Also romanized as ‘Arab Būrān; also known as ‘Arab Būlān) is a village in Yanqaq Rural District of the Central District in Galikash County, Golestan province, Iran.

== Demographics ==
=== Population ===
At the time of the 2006 National Census, the village's population was 991 in 211 households, when it was in the former Galikash District of Minudasht County. The following census in 2011 counted 1,005 people in 283 households, by which time the district had been separated from the county in the establishment of Galikash County. The rural district was transferred to the new Central District. The 2016 census measured the population of the village as 926 people in 276 households.
