= Qanjeq-e Shahrak =

Village in Golestan province, Iran

Qanjeq-e Shahrak Persian: قانجق شهرك
- Village
- Location within Iran
- Coordinates: 37°21′15″N 55°33′59″E
- Country: Iran
- Province: Golestan
- County: Galikash
- District: Loveh
- Rural District: Qaravolan

Population (2016)
  - Total: 871
- Time zone: UTC+3:30 (IRST)

Qanjeq-e Shahrak (Persian: قانجق شهرك) (Note: Also romanized as Qānjeq Shahrak and Qānjeq-e Shahrak; also known as Ghanjagh, Kanjīk, Qānjeq, and Quanjeg-e Sharak) is a village in Qaravolan Rural District of Loveh District in Galikash County, Golestan province, Iran.

== Demographics ==
=== Population ===
At the time of the 2006 National Census, the village's population was 957 in 216 households, when it was in the former Galikash District of Minudasht County. The following census in 2011 counted 889 people in 232 households, by which time the district had been separated from the county in the establishment of Galikash County. The rural district was transferred to the new Loveh District. The 2016 census measured the population of the village as 871 people in 260 households.
