= Gilan Tappeh =

Gilan Tappeh گيلان تپه
- Village
- Location within Iran
- Coordinates: 37°20′22″N 55°29′21″E
- Country: Iran
- Province: Golestan
- County: Galikash
- Bakhsh: Central
- Rural District: Yanqaq

Population (2016)
  - Total: 287
- Time zone: UTC+3:30 (IRST)

Gilan Tappeh (Persian: گيلان تپه, also Romanized as Gīlān Tappeh; also known as Gīlāntappeh) is a village in Yanqaq Rural District of Galikash County, Golestan Province, Iran (formerly in Qaravolan Rural District). At the 2016 census, its population was 286, in 84 households. Up from 260 in 2006.
