= Penu =

Penu may refer to:

- Penu, Estonia
- Penu, Gilan, Iran
- Penu, Golestan, Iran
