= Darabad, Golestan =

Village in Golestan province, Iran

Darabad Persian: داراباد
- Village
- Location within Iran
- Coordinates: 37°20′12″N 55°34′26″E
- Country: Iran
- Province: Golestan
- County: Galikash
- District: Loveh
- Rural District: Qaravolan

Population (2016)
  - Total: 817
- Time zone: UTC+3:30 (IRST)

Darabad (Persian: داراباد) (Note: Also romanized as Dārābād) is a village in Qaravolan Rural District of Loveh District in Galikash County, Golestan province, Iran.

== Demographics ==
=== Population ===
At the time of the 2006 National Census, the village's population was 860 in 186 households, when it was in the former Galikash District of Minudasht County. The following census in 2011 counted 852 people in 227 households, by which time the district had been separated from the county in the establishment of Galikash County. The rural district was transferred to the new Loveh District. The 2016 census measured the population of the village as 817 people in 229 households.
