= Yurt-e Zeynal =

Village in Golestan province, Iran

Yurt-e Zeynal Persian: يورت زينل
- Village
- Location within Iran
- Coordinates: 37°14′20″N 55°31′04″E
- Country: Iran
- Province: Golestan
- County: Galikash
- District: Central
- Rural District: Nilkuh

Population (2016)
  - Total: 253
- Time zone: UTC+3:30 (IRST)

Yurt-e Zeynal (Persian: يورت زينل) (Note: Also romanized as Yūrt-e Zeynal; also known as Yowrd-e Zeynab) is a village in Nilkuh Rural District of the Central District in Galikash County, Golestan province, Iran.

== Demographics ==
=== Population ===
At the time of the 2006 National Census, the village's population was 217 in 54 households, when it was in the former Galikash District of Minudasht County. The following census in 2011 counted 261 people in 80 households, by which time the district had been separated from the county in the establishment of Galikash County. The rural district was transferred to the new Central District. The 2016 census measured the population of the village as 253 people in 67 households.
