= Chaqar Besh Qardash =

Village in Golestan province, Iran

Chaqar Besh Qardash Persian: چقربش قارداش
- Village
- Location within Iran
- Coordinates: 37°19′31″N 55°32′59″E
- Country: Iran
- Province: Golestan
- County: Galikash
- District: Loveh
- Rural District: Qaravolan

Population (2016)
  - Total: 1,315
- Time zone: UTC+3:30 (IRST)

Chaqar Besh Qardash (Persian: چقربش قارداش) (Note: Also romanized as Chaqar Besh Qārdāsh) is a village in Qaravolan Rural District of Loveh District in Galikash County, Golestan province, Iran.

== Demographics ==
=== Population ===
At the time of the 2006 National Census, the village's population was 1,161 in 281 households, when it was in the former Galikash District of Minudasht County. The following census in 2011 counted 1,315 people in 385 households, by which time the district had been separated from the county in the establishment of Galikash County. The rural district was transferred to the new Loveh District. The 2016 census measured the population of the village as 1,315 people in 403 households.
