= Tarang Tappeh =

Village in Golestan province, Iran

Tarang Tappeh Persian: تورنگ تپه
- Village
- Location within Iran
- Coordinates: 37°19′31″N 55°27′57″E
- Country: Iran
- Province: Golestan
- County: Galikash
- District: Central
- Rural District: Yanqaq

Population (2016)
  - Total: 510
- Time zone: UTC+3:30 (IRST)

Tarang Tappeh (Persian: ترنگ تپه) (Note: Also known as Tūrang Tappeh) is a village in Yanqaq Rural District of the Central District in Galikash County, Golestan province, Iran.

== Demographics ==
=== Population ===
At the time of the 2006 National Census, the village's population was 553 in 129 households, when it was in the former Galikash District of Minudasht County. The following census in 2011 counted 551 people in 151 households, by which time the district had been separated from the county in the establishment of Galikash County. The rural district was transferred to the new Central District. The 2016 census measured the population of the village as 510 people in 157 households.
