= Aq Qamish =

Village in Golestan province, Iran

Aq Qamish Persian: اق قميش
- Village
- Location within Iran
- Coordinates: 37°21′41″N 55°36′52″E
- Country: Iran
- Province: Golestan
- County: Galikash
- District: Loveh
- Rural District: Qaravolan

Population (2016)
  - Total: 1,512
- Time zone: UTC+3:30 (IRST)

Aq Qamish (Persian: اق قميش) (Note: Also romanized as Āq Qamīsh) is a village in, and the capital of, Qaravolan Rural District in Loveh District of Galikash County, Golestan province, Iran.

== Demographics ==
=== Population ===
At the time of the 2006 National Census, the village's population was 1,549 in 341 households, when it was in the former Galikash District of Minudasht County. The following census in 2011 counted 1,619 people in 427 households, by which time the district had been separated from the county in the establishment of Galikash County. The rural district was transferred to the new Loveh District. The 2016 census measured the population of the village as 1,512 people in 420 households.
