= Northern Iran =

Region in Iran

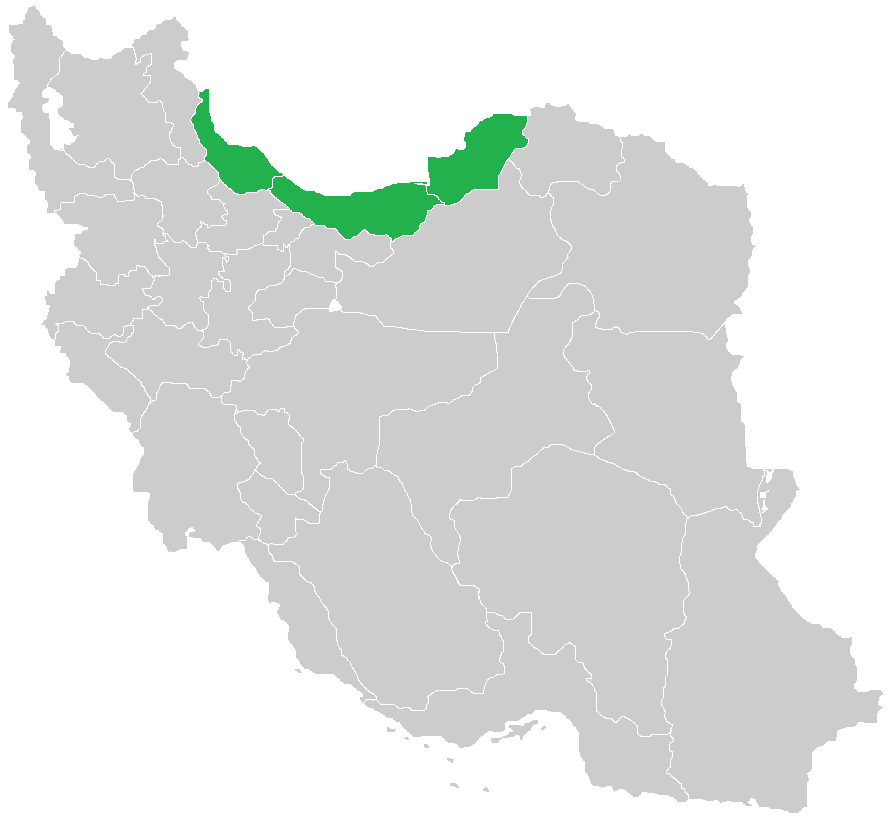
The provinces of Northern Iran

Northern Iran (Persian: شمال, romanized: Shomal, lit. 'North'), is a geographical term that refers to a relatively large and fertile area, consisting of the southern border of the Caspian Sea and the Alborz mountains.

It includes the provinces of Gilan, Mazandaran, and Golestan (ancient kingdom of Hyrcania and Tehran Province, medieval region of Tabaristan). The major provinces, Gilan and Mazandaran, are covered with dense forests, snow-covered mountains and impressive sea shores.

The major cities are Rasht, Gorgan, Sâri, Bâbol, Babolsar Amol, Qaem Shahr, Gonbad-e Kavus, Anzali, Lahijan and Behshahr. Northern Iran has numerous villages, particularly Massulé, appreciated by travellers.

Northern Iran was a trendy spot during the Pahlavi era, especially among foreign tourists. It was a luxurious place that provided all types of modern recreational facilities as well as tourism infrastructure. Today, it's mostly visited by domestic tourists.

== Population ==
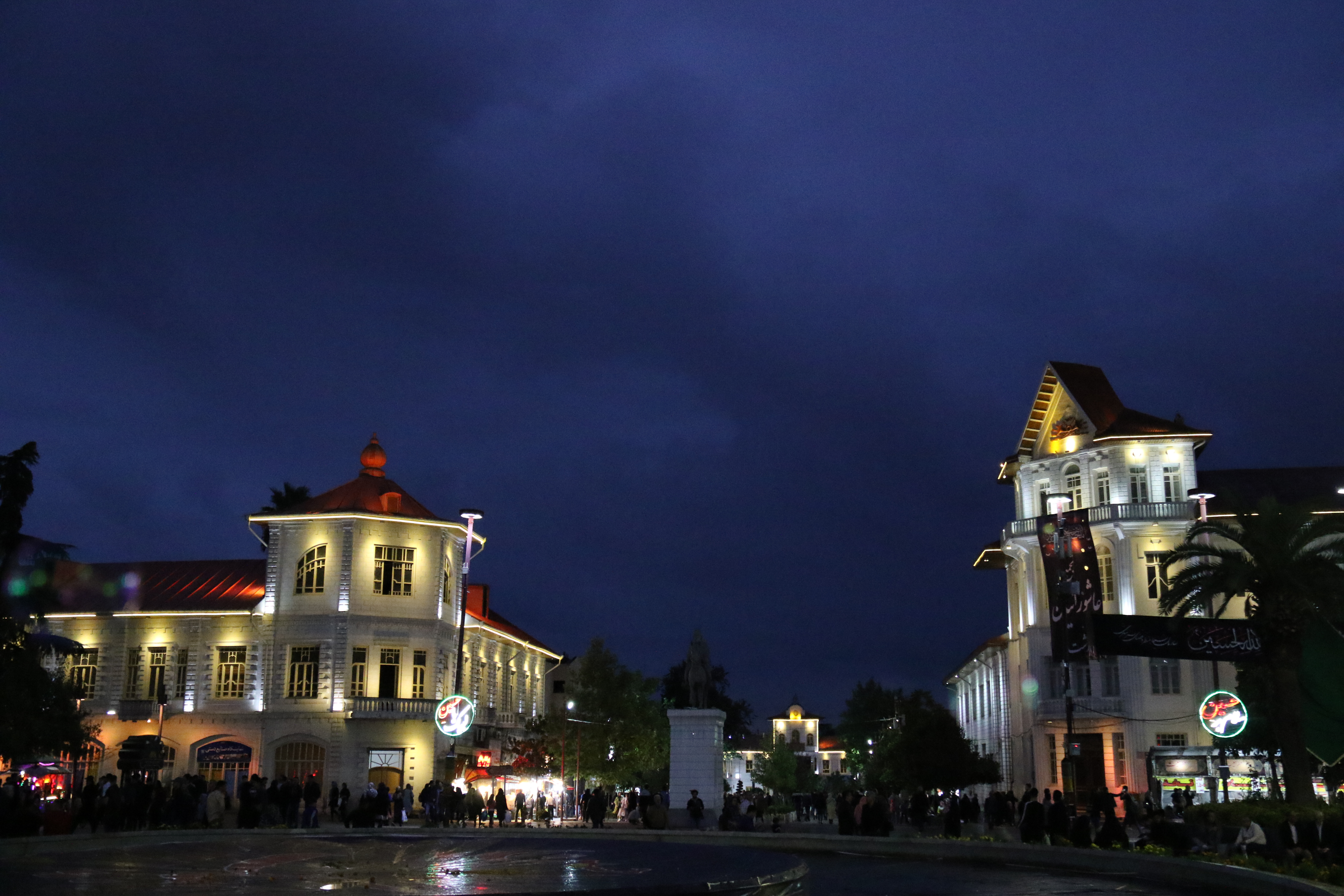
Downtown of Rasht

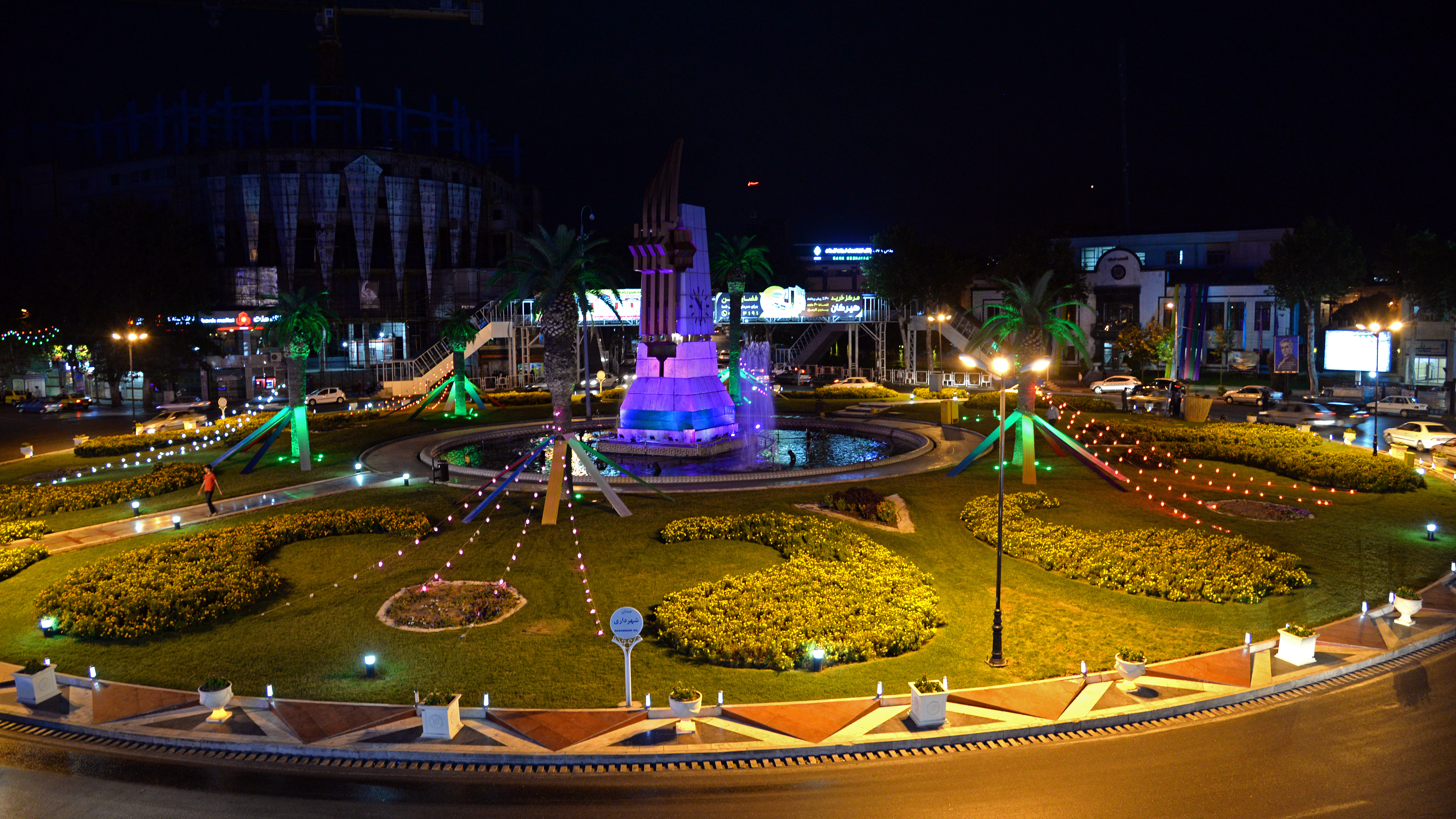
Gorgan

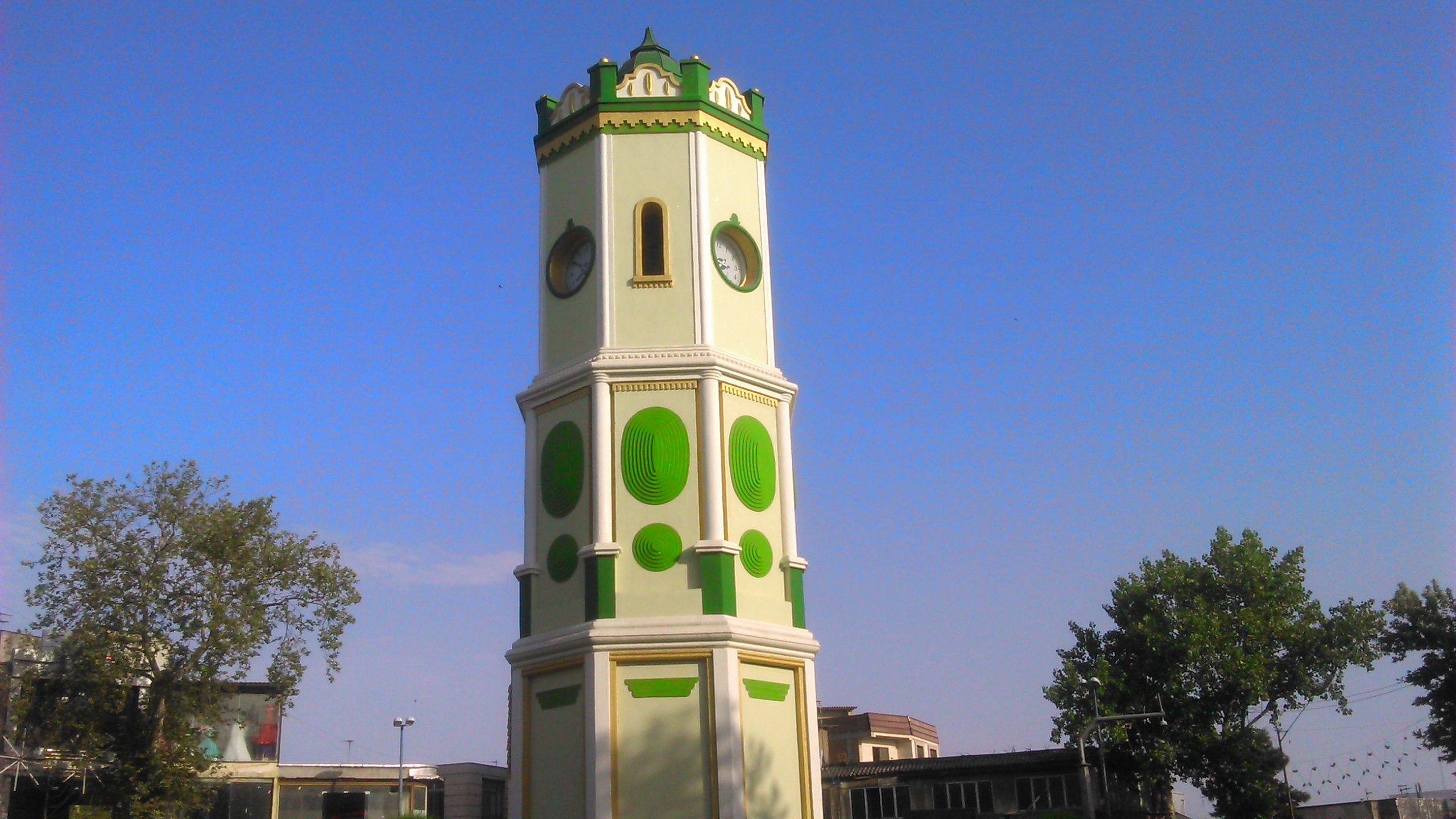
Clock Tower in Sari

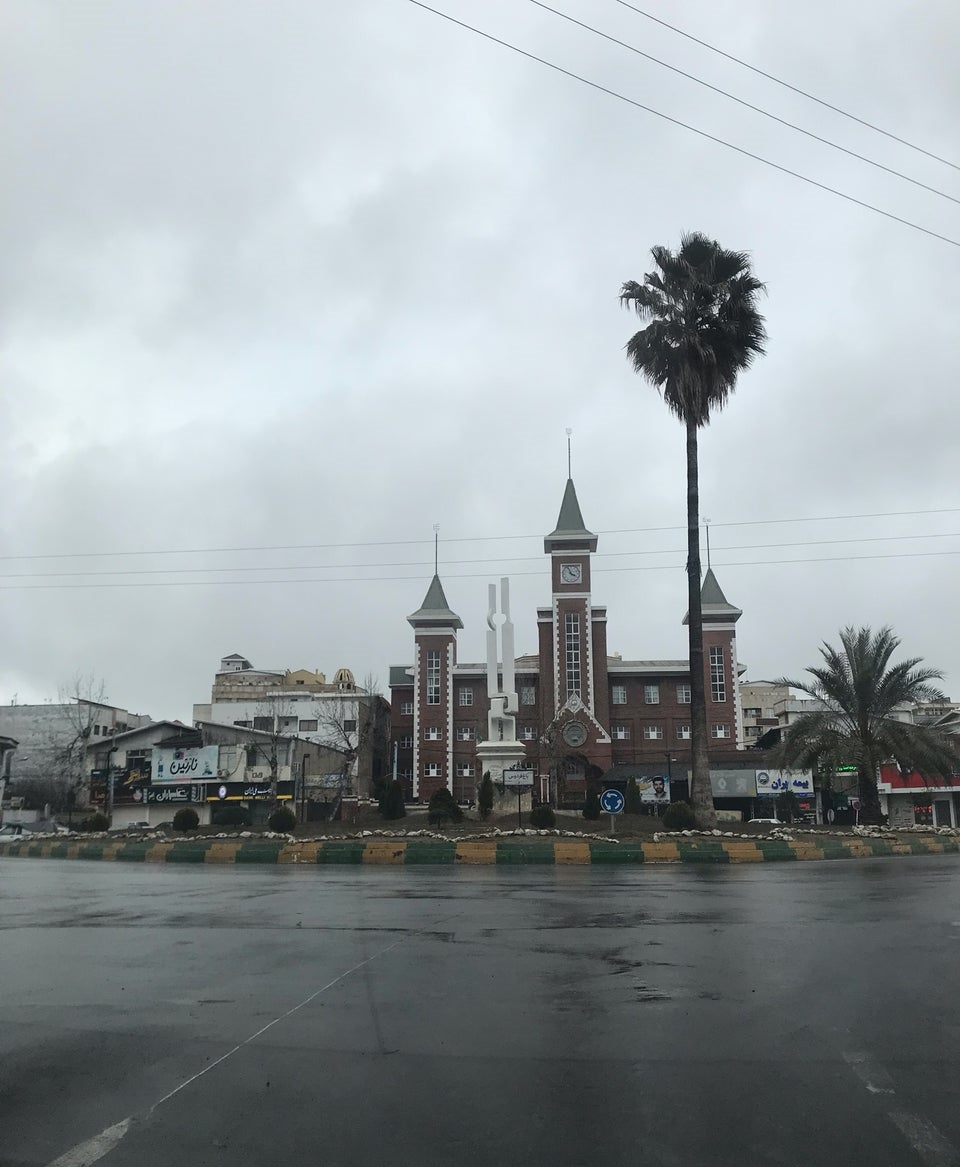
Bagh-Ferdous, Babol

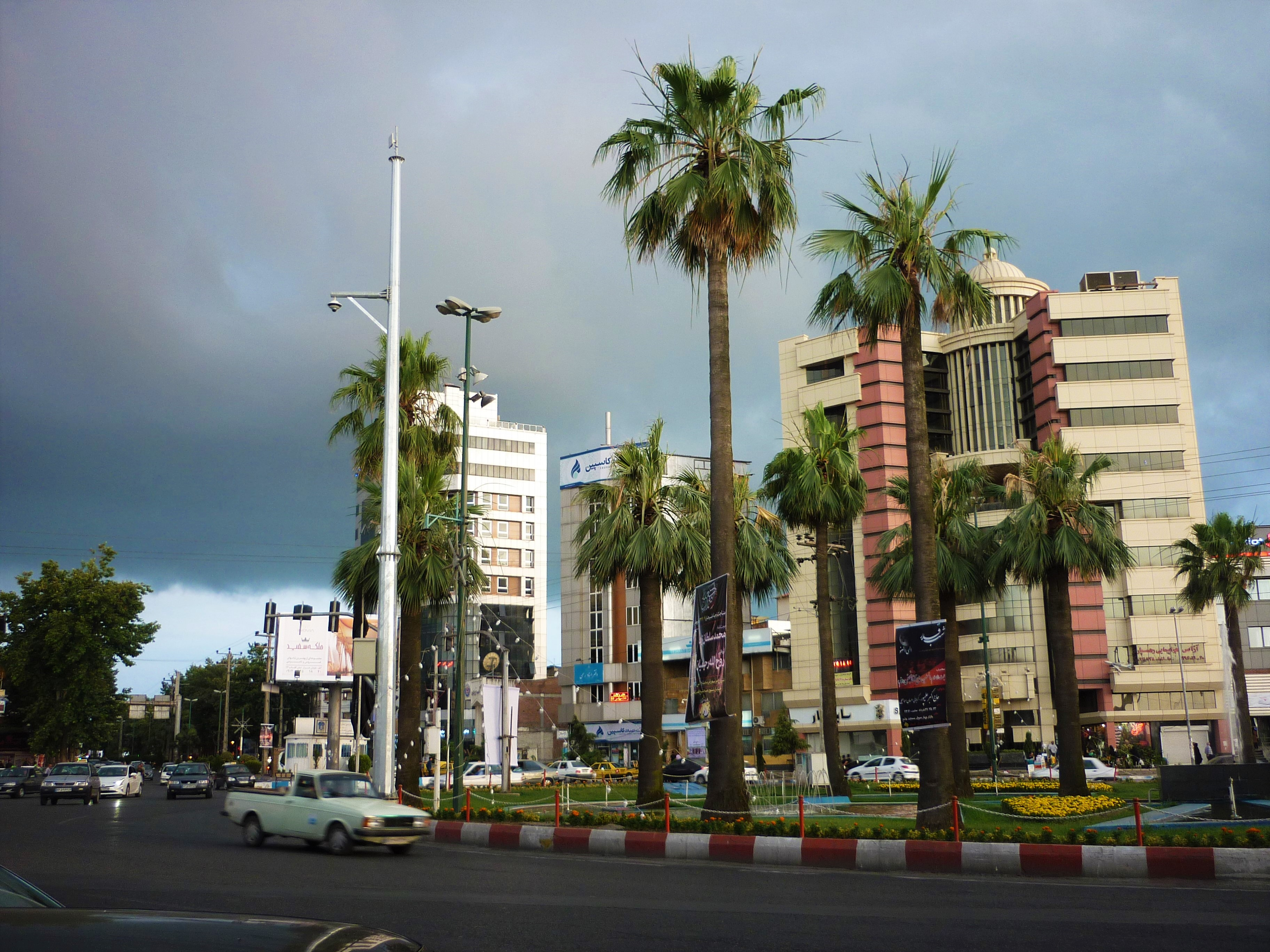
Amol

Mazandaran is the most populous of the 3 provinces of northern Iran, with 3,283,582 people at the time of 2016 census. Gilan's population in 2016 was 2,530,696 people and Golestan had the lowest population with 1,868,819 people.

The total population of the 3 provinces according to 2016 census was 7,683,097 people, with 2,486,429 households.

Population figures for cities in northern Iran
City	Province	Population (2016)	No. of households (2016)
Rasht	Gilan	679,995	228,142
Gorgan	Golestan	350,676	111,099
Sari	Mazandaran	309,820	101,932
Babol	Mazandaran	250,217	81,572
Amol	Mazandaran	237,528	78,597
Qaem Shahr	Mazandaran	204,953	68,407
Gonbad-e Kavus	Golestan	151,910	44,731
Bandar-e Anzali	Gilan	118,564	41,053
Lahijan	Gilan	101,073	34,497
Behshahr	Mazandaran	94,702	31,022
Langarud	Gilan	79,495	27,318
Chalus	Mazandaran	65,196	22,166
Neka	Mazandaran	60,991	19,357
Babolsar	Mazandaran	59,966	19,576
Tonekabon	Mazandaran	55,434	18,878
Tālesh(Hashtpar)	Gilan	54,178	16,832
Bandar Torkaman	Golestan	53,970	14,512
Aliabad-e Katul	Golestan	52,838	16,655
Astara	Gilan	51,579	16,696
Nowshahr	Mazandaran	49,403	16,287
Sowme'eh Sara	Gilan	47,083	15,331
Astaneh-ye Ashrafiyeh	Gilan	44,941	15,675
Azadshahr	Golestan	43,760	13,206
Kordkuy	Golestan	39,881	12,971
Fereydunkenar	Mazandaran	38,154	12,606
Rudsar	Gilan	37,998	13,191
Kalaleh	Golestan	36,176	10,346
Ramsar	Mazandaran	35,997	12,153
Fuman	Gilan	35,841	11,849
Aqqala	Golestan	35,116	9,498
Juybar	Mazandaran	32,924	10,480
Mahmudabad	Mazandaran	31,844	10,399
Amirkola	Mazandaran	30,478	10,120
Minudasht	Golestan	30,085	8,980
Nur	Mazandaran	26,947	8,597
Galikesh	Golestan	23,394	6,996
Galugah	Mazandaran	21,352	6,898
Khomam	Gilan	20,897	7,143
Bandar-e Gaz	Golestan	20,742	6,715
Ketalem and Sadat Shahr	Mazandaran	20,716	7,163
Siahkal	Gilan	19,924	6,796
Rezvanshahr	Gilan	19,519	6,212
Fazelabad	Golestan	19,461	5,869
Gomishan	Golestan	19,191	5,129
Masal	Gilan	17,901	5,330
Siminshahr	Golestan	17,205	4,493
Zirab	Mazandaran	16,191	5,037
Manjil	Gilan	15,630	4,950
Amlash	Gilan	15,444	5,268
Kiashahr	Gilan	14,022	5,037
Rostamabad	Gilan	13,746	4,312
Abbasabad	Mazandaran	13,482	4,500
Kelardasht	Mazandaran	13,401	4,565
Lowshan	Gilan	13,032	3,958
Sangar	Gilan	12,583	4,288
Ramian	Golestan	12,426	3,772
Kelachay	Gilan	12,379	4,329
Rostamkola	Mazandaran	11,686	3,979
Khorramabad	Mazandaran	11,542	3,902
Shirud	Mazandaran	11,377	3,851
Lavandevil	Gilan	11,235	3,318
Chamestan	Mazandaran	11,194	3,492
Khalil Shahr	Mazandaran	11,032	3,298
Khan Bebin	Golestan	10,878	3,328
Asalem	Gilan	10,720	3,271
Rahimabad	Gilan	10,571	3,507
Lasht-e Nesha	Gilan	10,539	3,742
Rudbar	Gilan	10,504	3,559
Hachirud	Mazandaran	10,398	3,471
Arateh	Mazandaran	10,327	3,301
Kuchesfahan	Gilan	10,026	3,450
Salman Shahr	Mazandaran	9,656	3,057
Surak	Mazandaran	9,208	3,087
Chaf and Chamkhaleh	Gilan	8,840	3,137
Shirgah	Mazandaran	8,671	2,869
Maraveh Tappeh	Golestan	8,671	2,072
Pol-e Sefid	Mazandaran	8,294	2,680
Chaboksar	Gilan	8,224	2,750
Shaft	Gilan	8,184	2,691
Daland	Golestan	8,184	2,453
Neginshahr	Golestan	8,138	2,344
Kiakola	Mazandaran	8,040	2,691
Pareh Sar	Gilan	8,016	2,536
Bahnemir	Mazandaran	7,906	2,541
Hadishahr	Mazandaran	7,889	2,549
Ruyan	Mazandaran	7,731	2,461
Izadshahr	Mazandaran	7,439	2,514
Luleman	Gilan	7,426	2,677
Gatab	Mazandaran	7,374	2,340
Khoshk-e Bijar	Gilan	7,245	2,470
Anbar Olum	Golestan	7,003	1,960
Galugah, Babol	Mazandaran	6,908	2,138
Marjaghal	Gilan	6,735	2,244
Sorkhrud	Mazandaran	6,699	2,248
Marzanabad	Mazandaran	6,698	1,841
Now Kandeh	Golestan	6,650	2,316
Kumeleh	Gilan	6,457	2,255
Nashtarud	Mazandaran	6,394	2,109
Kelarabad	Mazandaran	6,267	2,099
Faraghi	Golestan	5,777	1,610
Emamzadeh Abdollah	Mazandaran	5,768	1,809
Khush Rudpey	Mazandaran	5,742	1,906
Dowzeyn	Golestan	5,737	1,681
Bazar Jomeh	Gilan	5,729	1,762
Korand	Golestan	5,616	1,530
Chubar	Gilan	5,554	1,604
Pir Bazar	Gilan	5,373	1,761
Shalman	Gilan	5,102	1,855
Gurab Zarmikh	Gilan	4,840	1,610
Alqajar	Golestan	4,780	1,428
Vajargah	Gilan	4,537	1,563
Babakan	Mazandaran	4,499	1,462
Haviq	Gilan	4,261	1,169
Sangdevin	Golestan	4,203	1,255
Mazraeh	Golestan	4,009	1,352
Zargar	Mazandaran	3,991	1,311
Yanqaq	Golestan	3,919	1,143
Si Joval	Golestan	3,747	976
Lisar	Gilan	3,647	1,163
Ziabar	Gilan	3,603	1,193
Rudboneh	Gilan	3,441	1,220
Kiasar	Mazandaran	3,384	1,084
Pul	Mazandaran	3,150	1,064
Kojur	Mazandaran	3,120	1,052
Chukam	Gilan	3,096	1,019
Now Deh Khanduz	Golestan	2,989	959
Incheh Borun	Golestan	2,494	593
Jirandeh	Gilan	2,320	791
Kuhi Kheyl	Mazandaran	2,242	736
Farahabad	Mazandaran	2,217	762
Rankuh	Gilan	2,154	749
Ahmadsargurab	Gilan	2,128	727
Tabaqdeh	Mazandaran	2,023	723
Otaqvar	Gilan	1,938	662
Dabudasht	Mazandaran	1,758	572
Deylaman	Gilan	1,729	564
Maklavan	Gilan	1,635	536
Barehsar	Gilan	1,612	559
Sadeqabad	Golestan	1,593	488
Tutkabon	Gilan	1,510	493
Akand	Mazandaran	1,416	485
Alasht	Mazandaran	1,193	436
Taher Gurab	Gilan	1,168	396
Rineh	Mazandaran	982	352
Baladeh	Mazandaran	970	353
Pain Hular	Mazandaran	956	332
Marzikola	Mazandaran	868	301
Masuleh	Gilan	393	147
Farim	Mazandaran	369	127
Gazanak	Mazandaran	319	103

Capital of both the province and the county
Capital of the county

== People and language ==
The northern provinces of Iran are the motherland and fatherland of the Tabari people (Mazandarani and Katul people), Gilaks, Talashes, Tats, and the majority of the population of these three provinces are the Tabaris (Mazandarani and Katul people), Gilaks, Talashes, and Tats, who speak the language They speak Tabari (Mazandarani and Katuli), Gilaki language, Talshi language and Tati language. In addition to their mother tongue, the people of northern Iran also speak Persian.Iran is a very diverse country. "Dialect wise" there are different sub-languages and dialects of native speakers in the north of Iran as well the rest of the country. From the east to the west there are five major languages and hundreds of local dialects. If you talk to a native Iranian "north of Iran" are only the provinces on the south side of Caspian Sea which are Gilān, Māzandarān and Golestān, the last one has been separated from Māzandarān province at 1997. Despite Iranian opinion of the north of Iran, Khorāsan at the east and the two Āzerbāijāns at the west side of Iran are geographically at the north of Iran, therefore, their languages have been included in this article.

From the northeast, Khorasan which is a large province laid out from the north to the middle south of Iran and is a neighbor to the Afghanistan border. The language from the north to the south of this province changes drastically, In the north of Khorāsan people speak “Ghaz Turkish” going from the north to the middle of the province, the dialect changes to some sort of Arabic which belonged to an old Iraqi Arabic language. This language has been mixed drastically with Persian language which makes it impossible for an Arab speaker to understand it. There are some Kurdish speakers in the north of khorāsan as well.

From the north of Iran heading to the west, the next province is Golestān which has its own diversity in languages. until 1997 Golestān was a part of Māzandarān province. The main languages from the east to the west in this province are Turkmen, Turkish and then Māzandarāni which is among the oldest written languages of the country.

Māzandarān is the neighboring province which has the language of Māzandarāni all over the province which has over tens of different dialects in different regions, almost all of them are sub categories of Māzandarāni. Native people of Māzandarān call themselves Tabari and their Mazanderani language . The name Tapuri / Tabari (which was the name of an ancient language spoken somewhere in former Tapuria) is now used in preference to the name Mazandarani by the young. The earliest references to the language of Mazandaran, called Tabari, are to be found in the works of the early Muslim geographers. Al-Muqaddasī (or Moqaisi, 10th century), for example, notes: "The languages of Komish and Gurgan are similar, they use hā, as in hā-dih and hāk-un, and they are sweet [to the ear], related to them is the language of Tabaristan, [similar] save for its speediness."

The next province is Gilān, and the people of Gilān have three major languages: Gilaki language, Rudbāri and Tāleshi with some other old languages which are spoken in small region on Gilān only. In the western side of Gilān people speak some sort of Gilaki which is heavily mixed with Āzari Turkish, the language of the neighboring province.

After Gilān in the northwest of Iran, there are two Āzerbāijān provinces, the east and west ones, the main language is Āzari Turkish which is native language to the people of these provinces.

Majority of young generations of Iranian, in all over the country, are able to speak, read, and write Persian, which is a national language of the country and they learn it in schools.

== Climate ==
- Cold semi-arid climate: the high mountains and valleys in parts of the Alborz range. In the heights, the weather is cold mountainous and most of the precipitation is in the form of snow. Manjil is an example of semi-arid climate found in the region.
- Mediterranean climate: found in eastern parts of Mazandaran and parts of Golestan. The weather is hot and dry in summer and wet in autumn and winter. Annual precipitation is from 450mm in Gonbad-e Kavus to over 900mm in Babolsar. Other examples include Gorgan and Amol.
- Humid subtropical climate: covering central and western plains of Mazandaran and the province of Gilān. The average annual rainfall amounts to 1200 or 1300 mm or even up to 1800 mm as in Bandar-e Anzali, other examples include Rasht, and Astara.

Climatological normals for stations in northern Iran (period 1991-2020)
Parameter	Rasht	Gorgan	Qaem Shahr (Qara Kheyl)	Bandar-e Anzali	Babolsar	Nowshahr	Ramsar	Maraveh Tappeh
WMO Station number	40719	40738	40737	40718	40736	40734	40732	40721
Mean daily max/min (January)	11.6 °C/3.8 °C (52.9 °F/38.8 °F)	12.8 °C/1.9 °C (55.0 °F/35.4 °F)	12.6 °C/3.1 °C (54.7 °F/37.6 °F)	10.3 °C/5.6 °C (50.5 °F/42.1 °F)	12.6 °C/5.4 °C (54.7 °F/41.7 °F)	11.6 °C/4.6 °C (52.9 °F/40.3 °F)	11.4 °C/5.0 °C (52.5 °F/41.0 °F)	11.2 °C/3.6 °C (52.2 °F/38.5 °F)
Mean daily max/min (July)	30.5 °C/21.8 °C (86.9 °F/71.2 °F)	33.5 °C/22.9 °C (92.3 °F/73.2 °F)	30.9 °C/22.2 °C (87.6 °F/72.0 °F)	29.2 °C/23.7 °C (84.6 °F/74.7 °F)	30.0 °C/23.4 °C (86.0 °F/74.1 °F)	29.1 °C/22.3 °C (84.4 °F/72.1 °F)	29.2 °C/22.9 °C (84.6 °F/73.2 °F)	34.7 °C/23.3 °C (94.5 °F/73.9 °F)
Average Annual Precipitation	1,382.8 mm (54.44 in)	516.2 mm (20.32 in)	722.7 mm (28.45 in)	1,713.8 mm (67.47 in)	909.3 mm (35.80 in)	1,325.1 mm (52.17 in)	1,238.4 mm (48.76 in)	363.2 mm (14.30 in)
No. of days with precipitation ≥ 1.0 mm	113.8	63.1	74.9	102.4	71.1	93.7	89.2	49.6
No. of days with Rain/Drizzle	98	77.7	104.4	113.7	89	109.6	103	58.4
No. of days with Rain Showers	31.7	26.7	22.4	42.6	24.5	34	32.4	16.7
No. of days with Snow depth > 0 cm	8	1.2	0.9	2.6	1	1.6	1.6	5.9
Mean Annual Sunshine hours	1748	2287	2008	1920	2095	1898	1658	2720

== See also ==
- Caspian languages
- Northwestern Iran
- Western Iran
- Eastern Iran
- Central Iran
- Southern Iran
