= Kamalabad, Galikash =

Village in Golestan province, Iran

Kamalabad Persian: كمال آباد
- Village
- Location within Iran
- Coordinates: 37°18′11″N 55°28′06″E
- Country: Iran
- Province: Golestan
- County: Galikash
- District: Central
- Rural District: Yanqaq

Population (2016)
  - Total: 1,205
- Time zone: UTC+3:30 (IRST)

Kamalabad (Persian: كمال آباد) (Note: Also romanized as Kamālābād) is a village in Yanqaq Rural District of the Central District in Galikash County, Golestan province, Iran.

== Demographics ==
=== Population ===
At the time of the 2006 National Census, the village's population was 1,036 in 231 households, when it was in the former Galikash District of Minudasht County. The following census in 2011 counted 1,194 people in 280 households, by which time the district had been separated from the county in the establishment of Galikash County. The rural district was transferred to the new Central District. The 2016 census measured the population of the village as 1,205 people in 333 households.
