= Talustan =

Village in Golestan province, Iran

Talustan Persian: تلوستان
- Village
- Location within Iran
- Coordinates: 37°17′15″N 55°28′11″E
- Country: Iran
- Province: Golestan
- County: Galikash
- District: Central
- Rural District: Yanqaq

Population (2016)
  - Total: 598
- Time zone: UTC+3:30 (IRST)

Talustan (Persian: تلوستان) (Note: Also romanized as Talūstān; also known as Taldastān) is a village in Yanqaq Rural District of the Central District in Galikash County, Golestan province, Iran.

== Demographics ==
=== Population ===
At the time of the 2006 National Census, the village's population was 591 in 142 households, when it was in the former Galikash District of Minudasht County. The following census in 2011 counted 631 people in 191 households, by which time the district had been separated from the county in the establishment of Galikash County. The rural district was transferred to the new Central District. The 2016 census measured the population of the village as 598 people in 202 households.
