= Liru =

Village in Golestan province, Iran

Liru Persian: ليرو
- Village
- Location within Iran
- Coordinates: 37°11′39″N 55°37′13″E
- Country: Iran
- Province: Golestan
- County: Galikash
- District: Central
- Rural District: Nilkuh

Population (2016)
  - Total: 505
- Time zone: UTC+3:30 (IRST)

Liru (Persian: ليرو) (Note: Also romanized as Lirow and Līrū) is a village in Nilkuh Rural District of the Central District in Galikash County, Golestan province, Iran.

== Demographics ==
=== Population ===
At the time of the 2006 National Census, the village's population was 461 in 110 households, when it was in the former Galikash District of Minudasht County. The following census in 2011 counted 437 people in 119 households, by which time the district had been separated from the county in the establishment of Galikash County. The rural district was transferred to the new Central District. The 2016 census measured the population of the village as 505 people in 153 households.
