= Ajan Shir Melli =

Village in Golestan province, Iran

Ajan Shir Melli Persian: اجن شيرملي
- Village
- Location within Iran
- Coordinates: 37°21′00″N 55°32′45″E
- Country: Iran
- Province: Golestan
- County: Galikash
- District: Loveh
- Rural District: Qaravolan

Population (2016)
  - Total: 335
- Time zone: UTC+3:30 (IRST)

Ajan Shir Melli (Persian: اجن شيرملي) (Note: Also romanized as Ājan Shīr Melī and Ajan Shīr Mellī) is a village in Qaravolan Rural District of Loveh District in Galikash County, Golestan province, Iran.

== Demographics ==
=== Population ===
At the time of the 2006 National Census, the village's population was 286 in 62 households, when it was in the former Galikash District of Minudasht County. The following census in 2011 counted 291 people in 78 households, by which time the district had been separated from the county in the establishment of Galikash County. The rural district was transferred to the new Loveh District. The 2016 census measured the population of the village as 335 people in 89 households.
