= Farang, Iran =

Village in Golestan province, Iran

Farang Persian: فرنگ
- Village
- Location within Iran
- Coordinates: 37°13′11″N 55°38′35″E
- Country: Iran
- Province: Golestan
- County: Galikash
- District: Central
- Rural District: Nilkuh

Population (2016)
  - Total: 412
- Time zone: UTC+3:30 (IRST)

Farang (Persian: فرنگ) (Note: Also known as Firang, Parang, and Pereng) is a village in Nilkuh Rural District of the Central District in Galikash County, Golestan province, Iran.

== Demographics ==
=== Population ===
At the time of the 2006 National Census, the village's population was 293 in 74 households, when it was in the former Galikash District of Minudasht County. The following census in 2011 counted 325 people in 89 households, by which time the district had been separated from the county in the establishment of Galikash County. The rural district was transferred to the new Central District. The 2016 census measured the population of the village as 412 people in 126 households.
