= Korang Kaftar =

Village in Golestan province, Iran

Korang Kaftar Persian: كرنگ كفتر
- Village
- Location within Iran
- Coordinates: 37°20′34″N 55°37′22″E
- Country: Iran
- Province: Golestan
- County: Galikash
- District: Loveh
- Rural District: Qaravolan

Population (2016)
  - Total: 716
- Time zone: UTC+3:30 (IRST)

Korang Kaftar (Persian: كرنگ كفتر) is a village in Qaravolan Rural District of Loveh District in Galikash County, Golestan province, Iran.

== Demographics ==
=== Population ===
At the time of the 2006 National Census, the village's population was 691 in 193 households, when it was in the former Galikash District of Minudasht County. The following census in 2011 counted 664 people in 207 households, by which time the district had been separated from the county in the establishment of Galikash County. The rural district was transferred to the new Loveh District. The 2016 census measured the population of the village as 716 people in 228 households.
