= Sar Cheshmeh, Golestan =

Village in Golestan province, Iran

Sar Cheshmeh Persian: سرچشمه
- Village
- Location within Iran
- Coordinates: 37°16′48″N 55°27′30″E
- Country: Iran
- Province: Golestan
- County: Galikash
- District: Central
- Rural District: Yanqaq

Population (2016)
  - Total: 565
- Time zone: UTC+3:30 (IRST)

Sar Cheshmeh (Persian: سرچشمه) is a village in Yanqaq Rural District of the Central District in Galikash County, Golestan province, Iran.

== Demographics ==
=== Population ===
At the time of the 2006 National Census, the village's population was 541 in 115 households, when it was in the former Galikash District of Minudasht County. The following census in 2011 counted 659 people in 176 households, by which time the district had been separated from the county in the establishment of Galikash County. The rural district was transferred to the new Central District. The 2016 census measured the population of the village as 565 people in 162 households.
