= Yurt-e Kazem =

Village in Golestan province, Iran

Yurt-e Kazem Persian: يورت كاظم
- Village
- Location within Iran
- Coordinates: 37°13′41″N 55°31′52″E
- Country: Iran
- Province: Golestan
- County: Galikash
- District: Central
- Rural District: Nilkuh

Population (2016)
  - Total: 128
- Time zone: UTC+3:30 (IRST)

Yurt-e Kazem (Persian: يورت كاظم) (Note: Also romanized as Yowrd-e Kāz̧em, Yūrd Kāzem, Yūrt Kāz̧em, and Yūrt-e Kāzem; also known as Yūrt) is a village in Nilkuh Rural District of the Central District in Galikash County, Golestan province, Iran.

== Demographics ==
=== Population ===
At the time of the 2006 National Census, the village's population was 153 in 41 households, when it was in the former Galikash District of Minudasht County. The following census in 2011 counted 137 people in 43 households, by which time the district had been separated from the county in the establishment of Galikash County. The rural district was transferred to the new Central District. The 2016 census measured the population of the village as 128 people in 36 households.
