= Qoli Tappeh =

Village in Golestan province, Iran

Qoli Tappeh Persian: قلی تپه
- Village
- Location within Iran
- Coordinates: 37°14′53″N 55°25′13″E
- Country: Iran
- Province: Golestan
- County: Galikash
- District: Central
- Rural District: Yanqaq

Population (2016)
  - Total: 1,627
- Time zone: UTC+3:30 (IRST)

Qoli Tappeh (Persian: قلی تپه) (Note: Also romanized as Qolī Tappeh; also known as Kālī Tappeh and Kālitepe) is a village in, and the capital of, Yanqaq Rural District in the Central District of Galikash County, Golestan province, Iran. The previous capital of the rural district was the village of Yanqaq, now a city.

== Demographics ==
=== Population ===
At the time of the 2006 National Census, the village's population was 2,660 in 649 households, when it was in the former Galikash District of Minudasht County. The following census in 2011 counted 1,652 people in 433 households, by which time the district had been separated from the county in the establishment of Galikash County. The rural district was transferred to the new Central District. The 2016 census measured the population of the village as 1,627 people in 504 households.
