= Pasang-e Pain =

Pasang-e Pain پا سنگ پايين
- Village
- Location within Iran
- Coordinates: 37°18′28″N 55°30′49″E
- Country: Iran
- Province: Golestan
- County: Galikash
- Bakhsh: Central
- Rural District: Yanqaq

Population (2016)
  - Total: 97
- Time zone: UTC+3:30 (IRST)

Pasang-e Pain (Persian: پا سنگ پايين, also Romanized as Pāsang-e Pā’īn and Pasang Pā’īn; also known as Sang-e Pā’īn) is a village in Yanqaq Rural District of Galikash County, Golestan Province, Iran (formerly in Qaravolan Rural District). At the 2006 census, its population was 143, in 34 families. Down to 97 people and 29 households in 2016.
