= Sorkhanabad =

Village in Golestan province, Iran

Sorkhanabad Persian: سرخن اباد
- Village
- Location within Iran
- Coordinates: 37°18′43″N 55°32′23″E
- Country: Iran
- Province: Golestan
- County: Galikash
- District: Loveh
- Rural District: Qaravolan

Population (2016)
  - Total: 210
- Time zone: UTC+3:30 (IRST)

Sorkhanabad (Persian: سرخن اباد) (Note: Also romanized as Sorkhanābād; also known as Sorkhān Āb and Sorkhūnābād) is a village in Qaravolan Rural District of Loveh District in Galikash County, Golestan province, Iran.

== Demographics ==
=== Population ===
At the time of the 2006 National Census, the village's population was 202 in 54 households, when it was in the former Galikash District of Minudasht County. The following census in 2011 counted 204 people in 58 households, by which time the district had been separated from the county in the establishment of Galikash County. The rural district was transferred to the new Loveh District. The 2016 census measured the population of the village as 210 people in 63 households.
