= Farsian, Galikash =

Village in Golestan province, Iran

Farsian Persian: فارسيان
- Village
- Location within Iran
- Coordinates: 37°13′43″N 55°36′11″E
- Country: Iran
- Province: Golestan
- County: Galikash
- District: Central
- Rural District: Nilkuh

Population (2016)
  - Total: 500
- Time zone: UTC+3:30 (IRST)

Farsian (Persian: فارسيان) (Note: Also romanized as Fārseyān, Fārsīān, and Fārsīyān; also known as Farsian Faraug, Fārsīān-e Farang, Pārsiān, and Qal‘eh-i-Fārsiān-i-Firang) is a village in, and the capital of, Nilkuh Rural District in the Central District of Galikash County, Golestan province, Iran.

== Demographics ==
=== Population ===
At the time of the 2006 National Census, the village's population was 408 in 114 households, when it was in the former Galikash District of Minudasht County. The following census in 2011 counted 472 people in 119 households, by which time the district had been separated from the county in the establishment of Galikash County. The rural district was transferred to the new Central District. The 2016 census measured the population of the village as 500 people in 142 households.
