= Manjalu =

Village in Golestan province, Iran

Manjalu Persian: منجلو
- Village
- Location within Iran
- Coordinates: 37°19′46″N 55°36′21″E
- Country: Iran
- Province: Golestan
- County: Galikash
- District: Loveh
- Rural District: Qaravolan

Population (2016)
  - Total: 205
- Time zone: UTC+3:30 (IRST)

Manjalu (Persian: منجلو) (Note: Also romanized as Manjalū and Manjelū; also known as Manjānlū) is a village in Qaravolan Rural District of Loveh District in Galikash County, Golestan province, Iran.

== Demographics ==
=== Population ===
At the time of the 2006 National Census, the village's population was 161 in 27 households, when it was in the former Galikash District of Minudasht County. The following census in 2011 counted 171 people in 44 households, by which time the district had been separated from the county in the establishment of Galikash County. The rural district was transferred to the new Loveh District. The 2016 census measured the population of the village as 205 people in 56 households.
