= Mirza Panak =

Village in Golestan province, Iran

Mirza Panak Persian: ميرزاپانك
- Village
- Location within Iran
- Coordinates: 37°17′27″N 55°24′41″E
- Country: Iran
- Province: Golestan
- County: Galikash
- District: Central
- Rural District: Yanqaq

Population (2016)
  - Total: 1,775
- Time zone: UTC+3:30 (IRST)

Mirza Panak (Persian: ميرزاپانك) (Note: Also romanized as Mīrzā Pānak; also known as Mīrzā Pānag and Mīrzā Pāng) is a village in Yanqaq Rural District of the Central District in Galikash County, Golestan province, Iran.

== Demographics ==
=== Population ===
At the time of the 2006 National Census, the village's population was 1,881 in 435 households, when it was in the former Galikash District of Minudasht County. The following census in 2011 counted 1,817 people in 488 households, by which time the district had been separated from the county in the establishment of Galikash County. The rural district was transferred to the new Central District. The 2016 census measured the population of the village as 1,775 people in 541 households.
