= Pay Doldol, Golestan =

Village in Golestan province, Iran

Pay Doldol Persian: پي دل دل
- Village
- Location within Iran
- Coordinates: 37°13′34″N 55°41′03″E
- Country: Iran
- Province: Golestan
- County: Galikash
- District: Central
- Rural District: Nilkuh

Population (2016)
  - Total: 507
- Time zone: UTC+3:30 (IRST)

Pay Doldol (Persian: پي دل دل) (Note: Also romanized as Pāy Doldol) is a village in Nilkuh Rural District of the Central District in Galikash County, Golestan province, Iran.

== Demographics ==
=== Population ===
At the time of the 2006 National Census, the village's population was 391 in 105 households, when it was in the former Galikash District of Minudasht County. The following census in 2011 counted 466 people in 136 households, by which time the district had been separated from the county in the establishment of Galikash County. The rural district was transferred to the new Central District. The 2016 census measured the population of the village as 507 people in 159 households.
