= Pasang-e Bala =

Village in Golestan province, Iran

Pasang-e Bala Persian: پاسنگ بالا
- Village
- Location within Iran
- Coordinates: 37°17′40″N 55°31′58″E
- Country: Iran
- Province: Golestan
- County: Galikash
- District: Loveh
- Rural District: Qaravolan

Population (2016)
  - Total: 1,863
- Time zone: UTC+3:30 (IRST)

Pasang-e Bala (Persian: پاسنگ بالا) (Note: Also romanized as Pāsang Bālā and Pāsang-e Bālā; also known as Pā Sang) is a village in Qaravolan Rural District of Loveh District in Galikash County, Golestan province, Iran.

== Demographics ==
=== Population ===
At the time of the 2006 National Census, the village's population was 2,038 in 529 households, when it was in the former Galikash District of Minudasht County. The following census in 2011 counted 1,970 people in 588 households, by which time the district had been separated from the county in the establishment of Galikash County. The rural district was transferred to the new Loveh District. The 2016 census measured the population of the village as 1,863 people in 569 households. It was the most populous village in its rural district.
