= Sijan =

Sijan may refer to:

- Lance Sijan, American pilot
- Sijan, Alborz, a village in Alborz Province, Iran
- Sijan, Golestan, a village in Golestan Province, Iran
- Sijan, the Occitan name for Sigean in France
- Siján, a village in northwestern Argentina
- Šijan, a Serbian and Croatian surname
