= Baluchabad, Galikash =

Baluchabad بلوچ آباد
- Village
- Location within Iran
- Coordinates: 37°09′48″N 55°15′30″E
- Country: Iran
- Province: Golestan
- County: Galikash
- Bakhsh: Central
- Rural District: Yanqaq

Population (2016)
  - Total: 450
- Time zone: UTC+3:30 (IRST)

Baluchabad (Persian: بلوچ آباد, also Romanized as Balūchābād) is a village in Yanqaq Rural District in the Central District of Galikash County, Golestan Province, Iran. At the 2016 census, its population was 450, in 124 families. Large increase from 53 people in 2006.
