= Hoseynabad, Galikash =

Hoseynabad حسين آباد
- Village
- Location within Iran
- Coordinates: 36°58′57″N 54°55′03″E
- Country: Iran
- Province: Golestan
- County: Galikash
- Bakhsh: Central
- Rural District: Yanqaq

Population (2016)
  - Total: 361
- Time zone: UTC+3:30 (IRST)

Hoseynabad (Persian: حسين آباد, also Romanized as Ḩoseynābād; also known as Ḩoseynābād-e Tappeh Sar) is a village in Yanqaq Rural District in the Central District of Galikash County, Golestan Province, Iran. At the 2006 census, its population was 685, in 158 families. Decreased to 363 people and 101 families in 2016.
