= Karimabad, Galikash =

Karimabad كريم آباد
- Village
- Location within Iran
- Coordinates: 37°15′00″N 55°09′00″E
- Country: Iran
- Province: Golestan
- County: Galikash
- Bakhsh: Central
- Rural District: Yanqaq

Population (2016)
  - Total: 409
- Time zone: UTC+3:30 (IRST)

Karimabad (Persian: كريم آباد, also Romanized as Karīmābād; also known as Karamābād) is a village in Yanqaq Rural District in the Central District of Galikash County, Golestan Province, Iran. At the 2016 census, its population was 409, in 121 families. Up from 369 people in 2006.
