= Sijan, Golestan =

Village in Golestan province, Iran

Sijan Persian: سيجان
- Village
- Location within Iran
- Coordinates: 37°16′23″N 55°40′09″E
- Country: Iran
- Province: Golestan
- County: Galikash
- District: Central
- Rural District: Nilkuh

Population (2016)
  - Total: 208
- Time zone: UTC+3:30 (IRST)

Sijan (Persian: سيجان) (Note: Also romanized as Sījān) is a village in Nilkuh Rural District of the Central District in Galikash County, Golestan province, Iran.

== Demographics ==
=== Population ===
At the time of the 2006 National Census, the village's population was 132 in 28 households, when it was in the former Galikash District of Minudasht County. The following census in 2011 counted 105 people in 27 households, by which time the district had been separated from the county in the establishment of Galikash County. The rural district was transferred to the new Central District. The 2016 census measured the population of the village as 208 people in 67 households.
