= Amlak-e Galikash =

Amlak-e Galikash املاك گاليكش
- Village
- Location within Iran
- Coordinates: 37°13′38″N 55°19′52″E
- Country: Iran
- Province: Golestan
- County: Galikash
- Bakhsh: Central
- Rural District: Yanqaq

Population (2016)
  - Total: 430
- Time zone: UTC+3:30 (IRST)

Amlak-e Galikash (Persian: املاك گاليكش, also Romanized as Āmlāḵ-e Gālīḵash; also known as Amlāk) is a village in Yanqaq Rural District in the Central District of Galikash County, Golestan Province, Iran. At the 2016 census, its population was 430, in 120 families.
