= Western Iran =

Geographic area of Iran

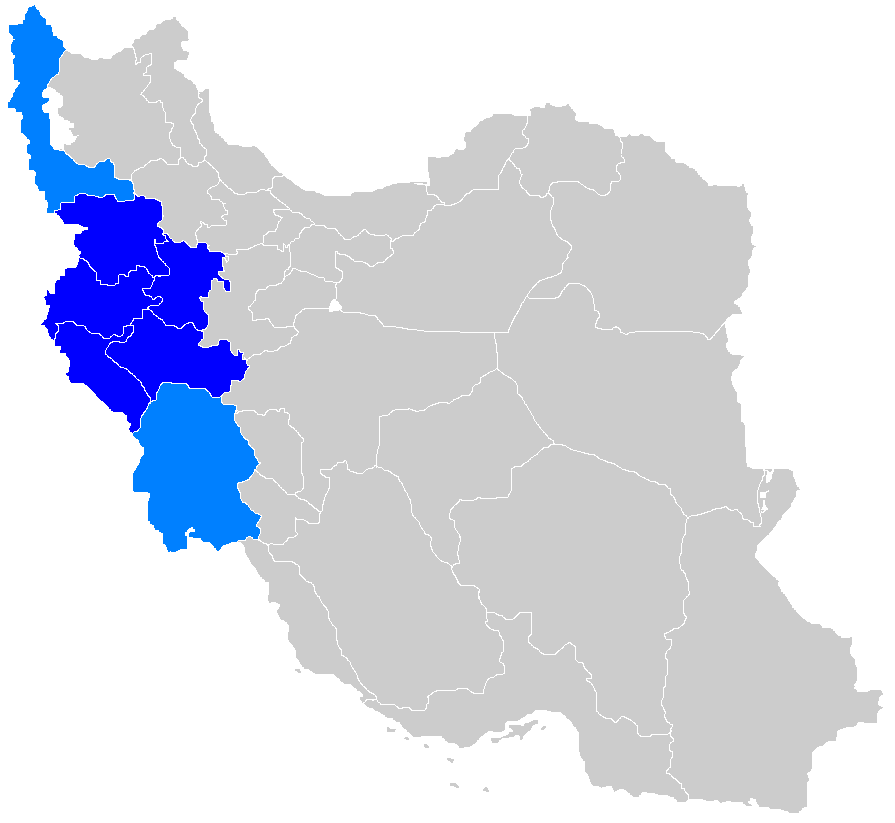
The provinces of Western Iran

Western Iran consists of Armenian Highlands, northern Zagros, and the rich agricultural area of the Khuzestan Plain in the south.

It includes the three majority Kurdish-inhabited provinces of Kurdistan (Kurdistan), Kermanshah and Ilam, the majority Luri-inhabited province of Lorestan, and the multi-ethnic province of Hamadan. Some references also count West Azerbaijan Province and Khuzestan Province to this region.

The major cities are Sanandaj, Kermanshah, Ilam, Khorramabad and Hamadan.

If the provinces of Khuzestan and West Azerbaijan are also included in this classification, the cities of Ahvaz, Urmia, Piranshahr, Dezful, Bukan, Mahabad, Salmas, and Abadan can also be considered as important cities of the western region of Iran.

== Climate ==
- Humid continental climate in the north.
- Hot-summer Mediterranean climate in the north.
- cold semi-arid climate in the Zagros mountains.
- Warm summer continental climate all over the central mountain ranges.
- Hot desert climate in Khuzestan.

== See also ==
- Northern Iran
- Southern Iran
- Eastern Iran
- Central Iran
- Northwestern Iran
