= Potaki, Golestan =

Village in Golestan province, Iran

Potaki Persian: پتكي
- Village
- Location within Iran
- Coordinates: 37°18′11″N 55°31′44″E
- Country: Iran
- Province: Golestan
- County: Galikash
- District: Loveh
- Rural District: Qaravolan

Population (2016)
  - Total: 194
- Time zone: UTC+3:30 (IRST)

Potaki (Persian: پتكي) (Note: Also romanized as Potakī) is a village in Qaravolan Rural District of Loveh District in Galikash County, Golestan province, Iran.

== Demographics ==
=== Population ===
The village did not appear in the 2006 National Census. The following census in 2011 counted 122 people in 36 households. The 2016 census measured the population of the village as 194 people in 57 households.
