= Golestan Rural District =

Golestan Rural District (Persian: دهستان گلستان) may refer to:

- Golestan Rural District (Golestan Province)
- Golestan Rural District (Isfahan Province)
- Golestan Rural District (Kerman Province)
- Golestan Rural District (North Khorasan Province)
