= Penu, Golestan =

Village in Golestan province, Iran

Penu Persian: پنو
- Village
- Location within Iran
- Coordinates: 37°12′16″N 55°42′19″E
- Country: Iran
- Province: Golestan
- County: Galikash
- District: Central
- Rural District: Nilkuh

Population (2016)
  - Total: 530
- Time zone: UTC+3:30 (IRST)

Penu (Persian: پنو) (Note: Also romanized as Penū; also known as Pūnū) is a village in Nilkuh Rural District of the Central District in Galikash County, Golestan province, Iran.

== Demographics ==
=== Population ===
At the time of the 2006 National Census, the village's population was 281 in 80 households, when it was in the former Galikash District of Minudasht County. The following census in 2011 counted 405 people in 110 households, by which time the district had been separated from the county in the establishment of Galikash County. The rural district was transferred to the new Central District. The 2016 census measured the population of the village as 530 people in 152 households. It was the most populous village in its rural district.
