= Persian Gulf—Black Sea corridor =

Persian Gulf—Black Sea corridor is a transport and transit corridor project proposed and created by Iran. The corridor project starts from the Persian Gulf and southern Iran, heads north across the country, and then continues to Armenia, from where it reaches the Georgian ports of Poti and Batumi in the Black Sea. From there, Ro-Ro ships cross the Black Sea to the Bulgarian ports of Burgas and Varna, after which the goods are again sent by road to Greece and on to the European Union.
