= Hoseynabad-e Qorbani, Galikash =

Hoseynabad-e Qorbani حسين آباد قربانی
- Village
- Location within Iran
- Coordinates: 37°19′07″N 55°27′09″E
- Country: Iran
- Province: Golestan
- County: Galikash
- Bakhsh: Central
- Rural District: Yanqaq

Population (2016)
  - Total: 182
- Time zone: UTC+3:30 (IRST)

Hoseynabad-e Qorbani (Persian: حسين آباد قربانی, also Romanized as Ḩoseynābād-e Qorbānī) is a village in Yanqaq Rural District in the Central District of Galikash County, Golestan Province, Iran. At the 2006 census, its population was 207, in 51 families. In 2016, its population was 182, in 58 households.
