= Khambarabad, Galikash =

Khambarabad خمبر آباد
- Village
- Location within Iran
- Coordinates: 37°18′00″N 55°27′00″E
- Country: Iran
- Province: Golestan
- County: Galikash
- Bakhsh: Central
- Rural District: Yanqaq

Population (2016)
  - Total: 360
- Time zone: UTC+3:30 (IRST)

Khambarabad (Persian: خمبر آباد, also Romanized as Khambarābād) is a village in Yanqaq Rural District in the Central District of Galikash County, Golestan Province, Iran. At the 2016 census, its population was 360, in 117 families. Decreased from 601 people in 2006.
