= Sadeqabad, Golestan =

City in Golestan province, Iran

Sadeqabad Persian: صادق آباد
- City
- Location within Iran
- Coordinates: 37°22′33″N 55°40′31″E
- Country: Iran
- Province: Golestan
- County: Galikash
- District: Loveh

Population (2016)
  - Total: 1,593
- Time zone: UTC+3:30 (IRST)

Sadeqabad (Persian: صادق آباد) (Note: Also romanized as Şādeqābād; formerly known as Sheghal Tappeh (شغال تپه)) is a city in, and the capital of, Loveh District in Galikash County, Golestan province, Iran.

== Demographics ==
=== Population ===
At the time of the 2006 National Census, Sadeqabad's population was 1,617 in 404 households, when it was a village in Qaravolan Rural District of the former Galikash District in Minudasht County. The following census in 2011 counted 1,592 people in 463 households, by which time the district had been separated from the county in the establishment of Galikash County. The rural district was transferred to the new Loveh District. The 2016 census measured the population of the village as 1,593 people in 488 households.

Sadeqabad was converted to a city in 2018.
