= Hoseynabad-e Qorbani =

Hoseynabad-e Qorbani (Persian: حسين ابادقرباني) may refer to:

- Hoseynabad-e Qorbani, Galikash
- Hoseynabad-e Qorbani, Ramian
