= Khambarabad =

Khambarabad (Persian: خمبر آباد) may refer to:

- Khambarabad, Galikash
- Khambarabad, Kalaleh
- Khambarabad, Torkaman
