= Punu =

Punu may refer to:

- Punu people, a people of Gabon
- Punu language, the language of the Punu people
- Bunu languages or Punu languages, the Hmongic languages of the Yao people of China
- Penu, Golestan or Pūnū, a village in Golestan, Iran
- Punu Chanyu, chanyu of the Xiongnu empire

== See also ==
- Puno, Peru
