= Yanqaq =

City in Golestan province, Iran

Yanqaq Persian: ينقاق
- City
- Location within Iran
- Coordinates: 37°17′48″N 55°22′05″E
- Country: Iran
- Province: Golestan
- County: Galikash
- District: Central

Population (2016)
  - Total: 3,919
- Time zone: UTC+3:30 (IRST)

Yanqaq (Persian: ينقاق) (Note: Also romanized as Yanqāq; also known as Banqāq) is a city in the Central District of Galikash County, Golestan province, Iran.

As a village, Yanqaq was the capital of Yanqaq Rural District until its capital was transferred to the village of Qoli Tappeh.

== Demographics ==
=== Population ===
At the time of the 2006 National Census, Yanqaq's population was 4,600 in 1,013 households, when it was a village in Yanqaq Rural District of the former Galikash District in Minudasht County. The following census in 2011 counted 4,073 people in 1,085 households, by which time the district had been separated from the county in the establishment of Galikash County. The rural district was transferred to the new Central District. The 2016 census measured the population of the village as 3,919 people in 1,143 households. It was the most populous village in its rural district.

The village of Yanqaq was converted to a city in 2023.
