= Nilkuh Rural District =

Rural district in Golestan province, Iran

Nilkuh Rural District Persian: دهستان نيلكوه
- Rural District
- Location within Iran
- Coordinates: 37°15′N 55°36′E
- Country: Iran
- Province: Golestan
- County: Galikash
- District: Central
- Established: 1987
- Capital: Farsian

Population (2016)
  - Total: 3,899
- Time zone: UTC+3:30 (IRST)

Nilkuh Rural District (Persian: دهستان نيلكوه) is in the Central District of Galikash County, Golestan province, Iran. Its capital is the village of Farsian.

== Demographics ==
=== Population ===
At the time of the 2006 National Census, the rural district's population (as a part of the former Galikash District in Minudasht County) was 3,239 in 818 households. There were 3,317 inhabitants in 914 households at the following census of 2011, by which time the district had been separated from the county in the establishment of Galikash County. The rural district was transferred to the new Central District. The 2016 census measured the population of the rural district as 3,899 in 1,158 households. The most populous of its 10 villages was Penu, with 530 people.

=== Other villages in the rural district ===
- Ab Paran
- Farang
- Kiaram
- Liru
- Pay Doldol
- Sijan
- Yurt-e Kazem
- Yurt-e Zeynal
