= Golestan Rural District (Galikash County) =

Rural district in Golestan province, Iran

Golestan Rural District Persian: دهستان گلستان
- Rural District
- Location within Iran
- Coordinates: 37°23′N 55°50′E
- Country: Iran
- Province: Golestan
- County: Galikash
- District: Loveh
- Established: 2010
- Capital: Tangrah

Population (2016)
  - Total: 4,002
- Time zone: UTC+3:30 (IRST)

Golestan Rural District (Persian: دهستان گلستان) is in Loveh District of Galikash County, Golestan province, Iran. Its capital is the village of Tangrah.

== History ==
In 2010, Galikash District was separated from Minudasht County in the establishment of Galikash County, and Golestan Rural District was created in the new Loveh District.

== Demographics ==
=== Population ===
At the time of the 2011 National Census, the rural district's population was 3,930 in 1,045 households. The 2016 census measured the population of the rural district as 4,002 in 1,138 households. The most populous of its eight villages was Tarjanli, with 1,343 people.

=== Other villages in the rural district ===
- Besh Evili
- Gugol-e Bozorg
- Kondeskuh
- Qusheh Cheshmeh
