= Southern Iran =

Region in Iran

The provinces of Southern Iran

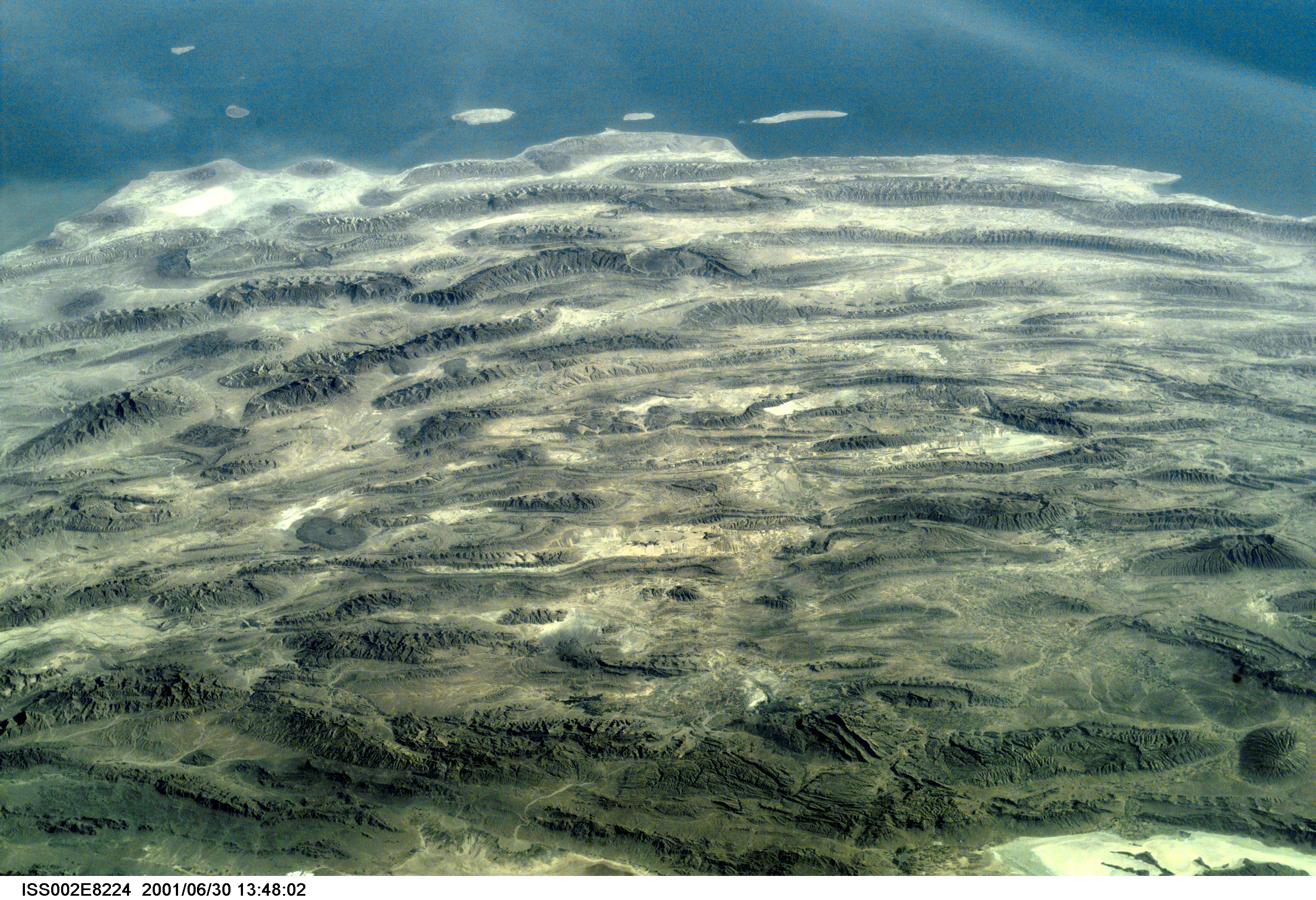
A satellite view of southern Iran

Southern Iran consists of the southern mountain ranges of Zagros and Central Iranian Range, Khuzestan Plain and the northern coasts of Persian Gulf and Strait of Hormuz.

== Definition ==
It includes the provinces of Fars (Persia), Kohgiluyeh and Buyer Ahmad, Hormozgan, and Bushehr. Sometimes Khuzestan and Kerman are also included in this region. The major cities in the region are Shiraz, Bandarabbas, and Kerman.

== Demographics ==
The south of Iran is very diverse in terms of ethnicity, which includes Persians (including Kohmereh, Basseri, Achomi, etc.), Arabs and Iranians of African origin. In addition, other ethnic minorities of Iran migrated to this region for various reasons; these include Azerbaijanis, Mazandaranis, Gilaks, Talysh, Tats, Kurds, and Lurs, who migrated from other regions of Iran.

== Climate ==
- Hot desert climate (BWh) in the plains and the coast of the Persian Gulf.
- Cold semi-arid climate (BSk) in the mountain ranges.

== See also ==
- Northern Iran
- Persis
- Northwestern Iran
- Western Iran
- Eastern Iran
- Central Iran
