= Central Iran =

Region in Iran

The provinces of Central Iran

Central Iran (Persian: ایران مرکزی) consists of the southern slopes of the Alborz Mountains in the north, the Zagros Mountains in south, the Central Iranian Range, and the desert of Dasht-e Kavir.

It includes the provinces of Isfahan, Yazd, Chaharmahal and Bakhtiari, Markazi, Qazvin, Alborz, Tehran, Qom, and Semnan.

Its major cities are Tehran, Isfahan, Arak, Yazd, Karaj, Qazvin, Qom, Kashan, Saveh, and Shahr-e Kord.

== Climate ==
- Hot desert climate in the deserts.
- Cold desert climate in the central mountains.
- Humid continental climate on the few rivers.
- cold semi-arid climate in the high mountains.

== See also ==
- Northern Iran
- Western Iran
- Northwestern Iran
- Eastern Iran
- Southern Iran
