= Yanqaq Rural District =

Rural district in Golestan province, Iran

Yanqaq Rural District Persian: دهستان ينقاق
- Rural District
- Location within Iran
- Coordinates: 37°17′N 55°26′E
- Country: Iran
- Province: Golestan
- County: Galikash
- District: Central
- Established: 1987
- Capital: Qoli Tappeh

Population (2016)
  - Total: 20,164
- Time zone: UTC+3:30 (IRST)

Yanqaq Rural District (Persian: دهستان ينقاق) is in the Central District of Galikash County, Golestan province, Iran. Its capital is the village of Qoli Tappeh. The previous capital of the rural district was the village of Yanqaq, now a city.

== Demographics ==
=== Population ===
At the time of the 2006 National Census, the rural district's population (as a part of the former Galikash District in Minudasht County) was 17,954 in 4,064 households. There were 20,215 inhabitants in 5,386 households at the following census of 2011, by which time the district had been separated from the county in the establishment of Galikash County. The rural district was transferred to the new Central District. The 2016 census measured the population of the rural district as 20,164 in 5,958 households. The most populous of its 31 villages was Yanqaq (now a city), with 3,919 people.

=== Other villages in the rural district ===
- Amlak-e Galikash
- Arab Buran
- Baluchabad
- Eslamabad
- Esmailabad
- Gilan Tappeh
- Hoseynabad
- Hoseynabad-e Qorbani
- Kamalabad
- Karimabad
- Khambarabad
- Mahmudabad
- Mirza Panak
- Mohammadabad
- Pasang-e Pain
- Sar Cheshmeh
- Talustan
- Tarajiq
- Tarang Tappeh
