= Šijan =

Šijan is a Serbian and Croatian surname, Notable people with the name include:

- Ivan Šijan Croatian hockey player
- Dane Šijan (born 1977), Serbian handball player
- Slobodan Šijan (born 1946), Serbian film director
