= Eastern Iran =

Subdivision of Iran

The provinces of Eastern Iran

Eastern Iran includes the provinces North Khorasan, Razavi Khorasan, South Khorasan, and Sistan and Baluchestan some of which share a border with Afghanistan and Pakistan. Some references also count Kerman Province to this region.

Dominated by deserts, this region is characterised by an arid or hyper-arid climate.

The major cities are, in descending order of population, Mashhad, Zahedan, Sabzevar, Neyshabur, Bojnurd, Birjand, Zabol, Chabahar, and Kerman.

== See also ==
- Northern Iran
- Southern Iran
- Central Iran
- Northwestern Iran
