= Penu, Estonia =

Village in Estonia

Coordinates: 58°02′N 24°29′E

Penu
- Village
- Interactive map of Penu
- Country: Estonia
- County: Pärnu County
- Parish: Häädemeeste Parish
- Time zone: UTC+2 (EET)
  - Summer (DST): UTC+3 (EEST)

Penu is a village in Häädemeeste Parish, Pärnu County in southwestern Estonia. It is the sister city to Vagnu, Latvia.
