= Khuzestan Plain =

Flat plain in Khuzestan, Iran

Khuzestan Plains "Dashtenpehei Khozestan"
- Region
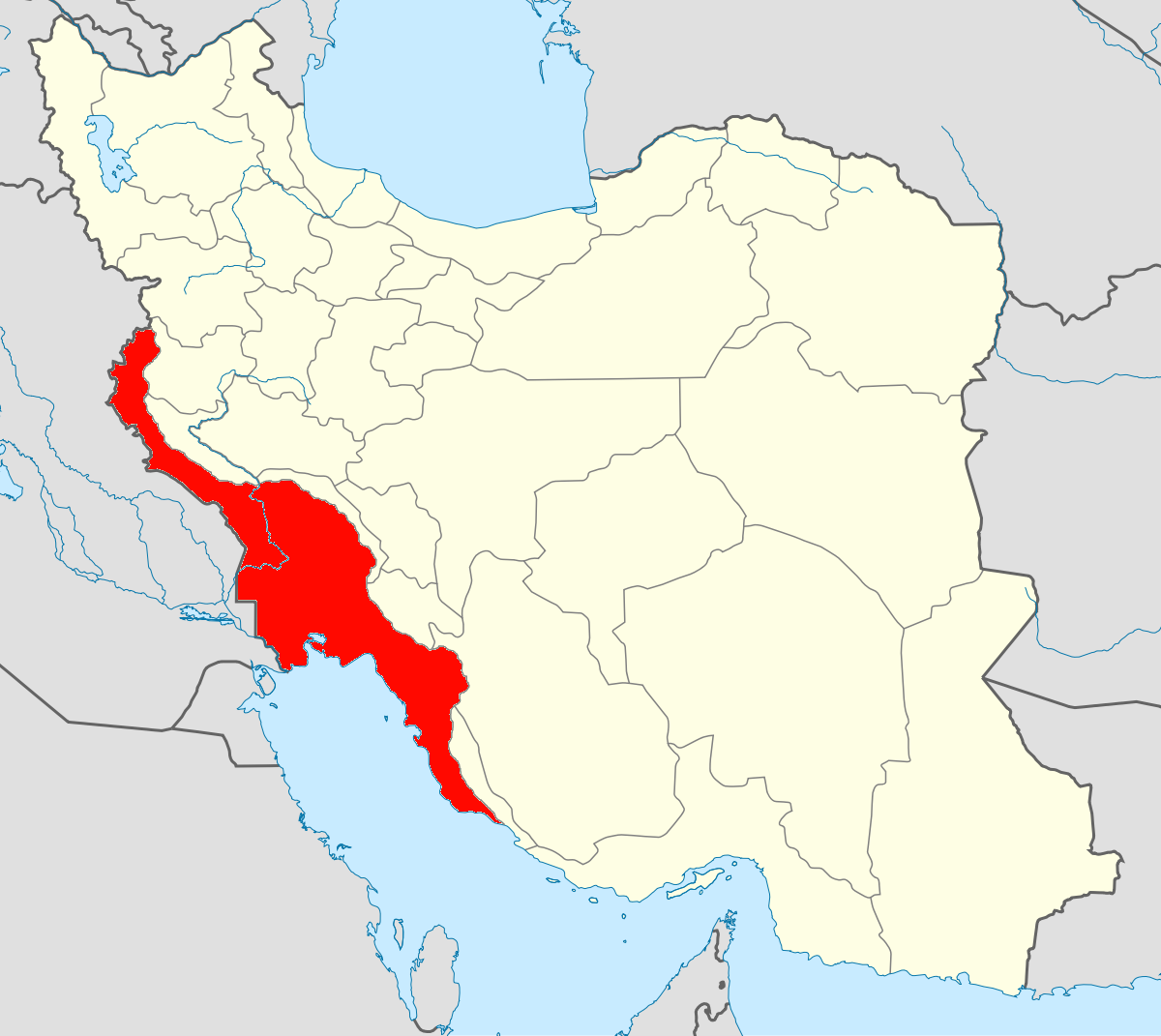

The Khuzestan Plain is the relatively flat region of Iran where the Khuzestan province and the cities of Ahvaz, Susa and Abadan are located. Khuzestan Plain borders Mesopotamia and is separated from it by the Shatt al-Arab (known as Arvand Rud in Iran) river.

== Wildlife ==
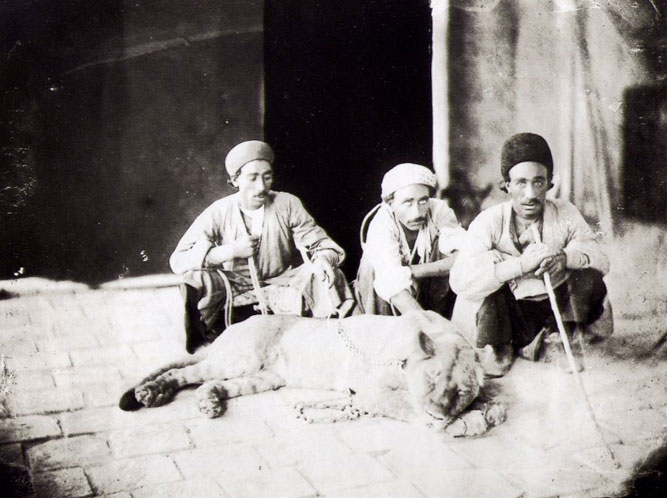
Photograph of a lion in Iran, by Antoin Sevruguin.

In the 19th and early 20th centuries, the Asiatic lion was recorded in Fars province, Ramhormoz County, Shushtar County, Dezful County and along the Karun river.

== See also ==
- Tidal irrigation
