= Galikash =

City in Golestan province, Iran

Galikash Persian: گالیکش
- City
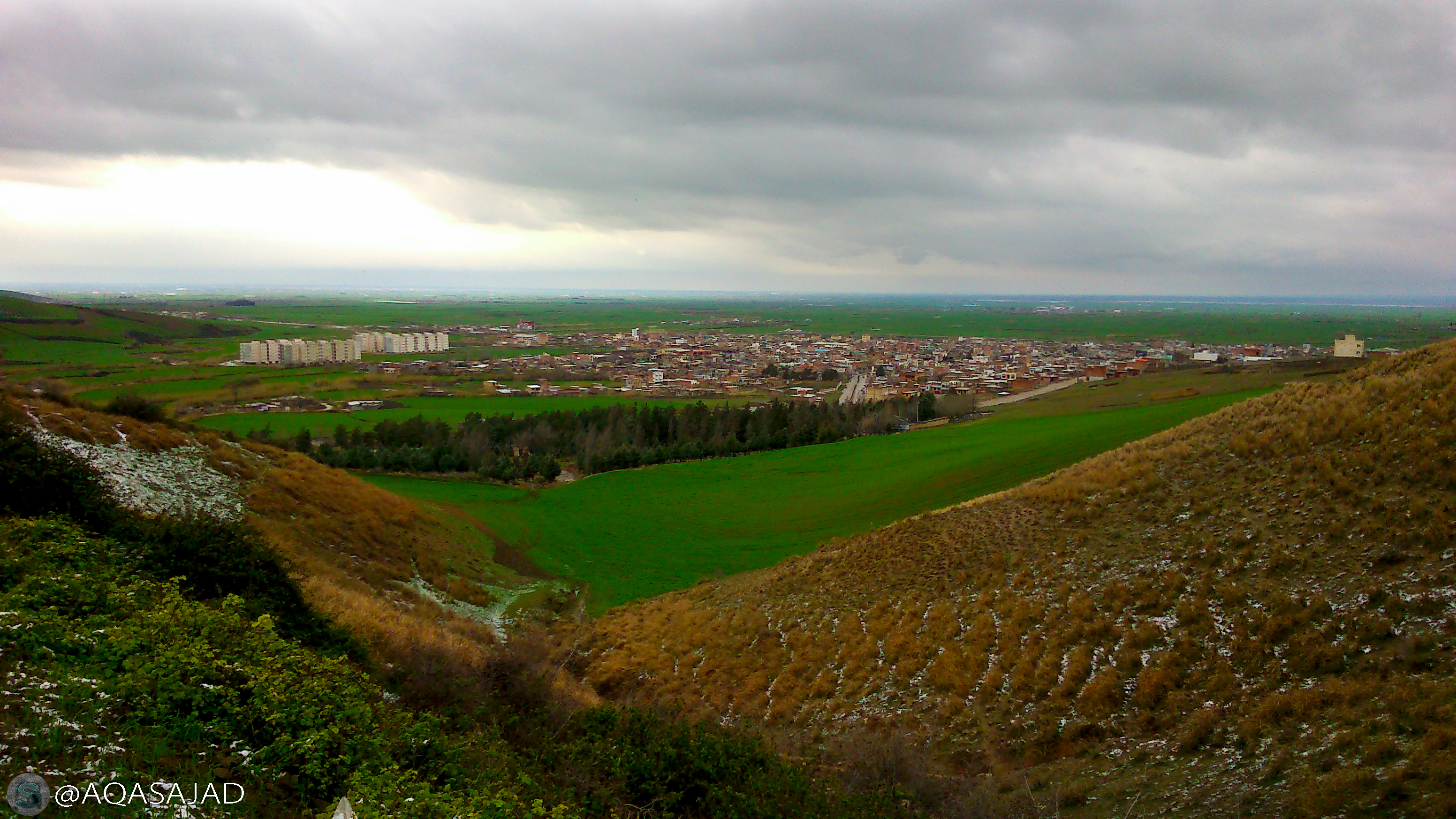
- Galikash view from the hills

- Location within Iran
- Coordinates: 37°16′22″N 55°25′58″E
- Country: Iran
- Province: Golestan
- County: Galikash
- District: Central

Population (2016)
  - Total: 23,394
- Time zone: UTC+3:30 (IRST)

Galikash (Persian: گالیکش) (Note: Also romanized as Galikesh) is a city in the Central District of Galikash County, Golestan province, Iran, serving as capital of both the county and the district.

== Demographics ==
=== Population ===
At the time of the 2006 National Census, the city's population was 20,009 in 4,829 households, when it was capital of the former Galikash District in Minudasht County. The following census in 2011 counted 20,831 people in 5,768 households, by which time the district had been separated from the county in the establishment of Galikash County. Galikash was transferred to the new Central District as the county's capital. The 2016 census measured the population of the city as 23,394 people in 6,996 households.
