= Qaravolan Rural District =

Rural district in Golestan province, Iran

Qaravolan Rural District Persian: دهستان قراولان
- Rural District
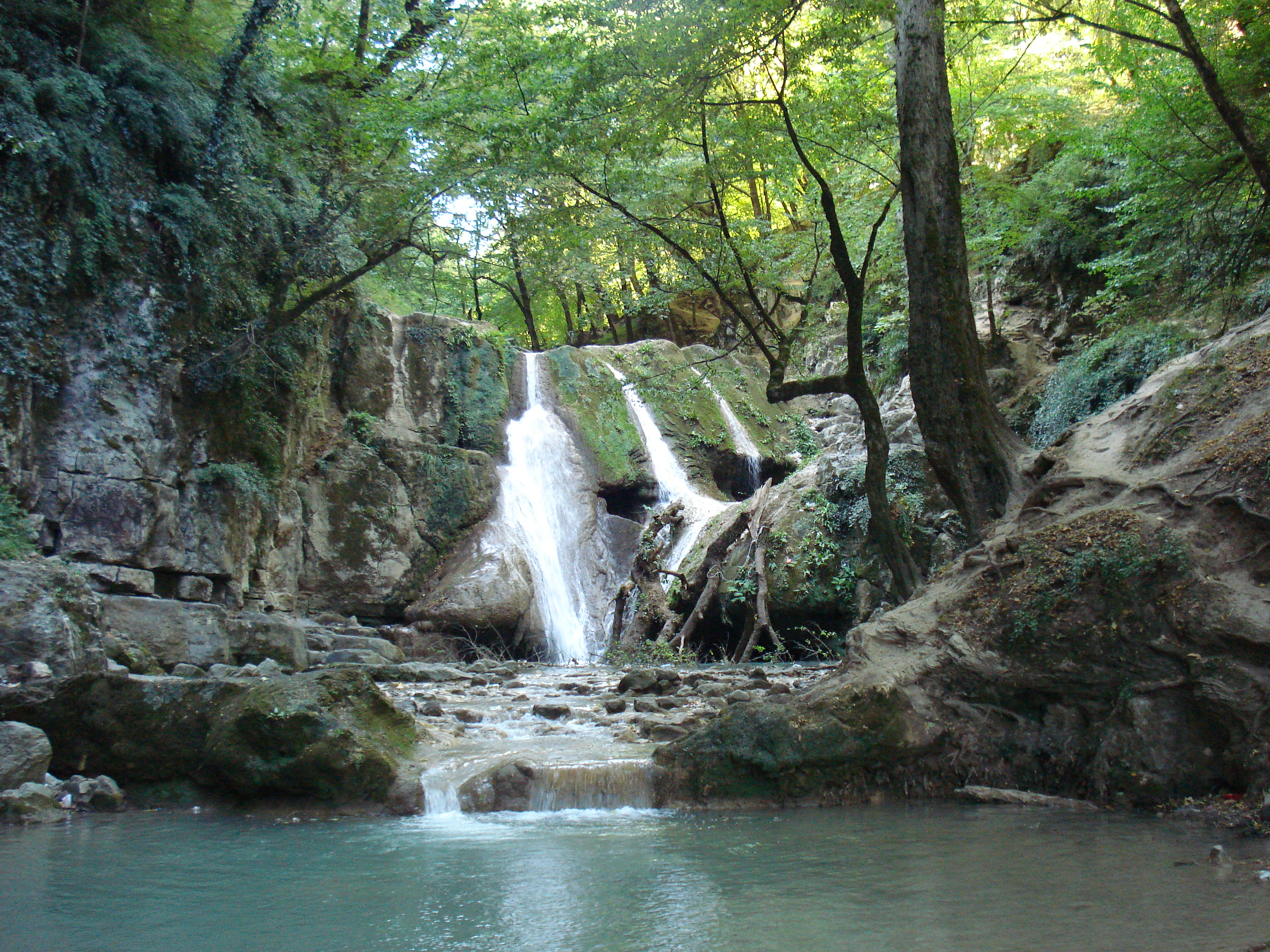
- Loveh Waterfall

- Location within Iran
- Coordinates: 37°20′N 55°37′E
- Country: Iran
- Province: Golestan
- County: Galikash
- District: Loveh
- Established: 1987
- Capital: Aq Qamish

Population (2016)
  - Total: 11,714
- Time zone: UTC+3:30 (IRST)

Qaravolan Rural District (Persian: دهستان قراولان) is in Loveh District of Galikash County, Golestan province, Iran. Its capital is the village of Aq Qamish.

== Demographics ==
=== Population ===
At the time of the 2006 National Census, the rural district's population (as a part of the former Galikash District in Minudasht County) was 16,202 in 3,995 households. There were 11,682 inhabitants in 3,285 households at the following census of 2011, by which time the district had been separated from the county in the establishment of Galikash County. The rural district was transferred to the new Loveh District. The 2016 census measured the population of the rural district as 11,714 in 3,471 households. The most populous of its 15 villages was Pasang-e Bala, with 1,863 people.

=== Other villages in the rural district ===
- Ajan Qarah Khvajeh
- Ajan Shir Melli
- Chaqar Besh Qardash
- Darabad
- Korang Kaftar
- Loveh
- Manjalu
- Potaki
- Qanjeq-e Shahrak
- Qereq-e Aq Qamish
- Sorkhanabad
