= Loveh District =

District in Golestan province, Iran

Loveh District Persian: بخش لوه
- District
- Location within Iran
- Coordinates: 37°22′N 55°45′E
- Country: Iran
- Province: Golestan
- County: Galikash
- Established: 2010
- Capital: Sadeqabad

Population (2016)
  - Total: 15,716
- Time zone: UTC+3:30 (IRST)

Loveh District (Persian: بخش لوه) is in Galikash County, Golestan province, Iran. Its capital is the city of Sadeqabad.

== History ==
In 2010, Galikash District was separated from Minudasht County in the establishment of Galikash County, which was divided into two districts of two rural districts each, with Galikash as its capital and only city at the time.

The village of Sadeqabad was converted to a city in 2018.

== Demographics ==
=== Population ===
At the time of the 2011 census, the district's population was 15,612 people in 4,330 households. The 2016 census measured the population of the district as 15,716 inhabitants in 4,609 households.

=== Administrative divisions ===
Loveh District Population
Administrative Divisions	2011	2016
Golestan RD	3,930	4,002
Qaravolan RD	11,682	11,714
Sadeqabad (city) (Note: Became a city after the 2016 census)		
Total	15,612	15,716
RD = Rural District
