= Central District (Galikash County) =

District in Golestan province, Iran

Central District (Galikash County) Persian: بخش مرکزی شهرستان گالیکش
- District
- Location within Iran
- Coordinates: 37°15′N 55°32′E
- Country: Iran
- Province: Golestan
- County: Galikash
- Capital: Galikash

Population (2016)
  - Total: 47,457
- Time zone: UTC+3:30 (IRST)

The Central District of Galikash County (Persian: بخش مرکزی شهرستان گالیکش) is in Golestan province, Iran. Its capital is the city of Galikash.

== History ==
In 2010, Galikash District was separated from Minudasht County in the establishment of Galikash County, which was divided into two districts of two rural districts each, with Galikash as its capital and only city at the time. In 2023, the village of Yanqaq was converted to a city.

== Demographics ==
=== Population ===
At the time of the 2011 census, the district's population was 44,363 people in 12,068 households. The 2016 census measured the population of the district as 47,457 inhabitants in 14,112 households.

=== Administrative divisions ===
Central District (Galikash County) Population
Administrative Divisions	2011	2016
Nilkuh RD	3,317	3,899
Yanqaq RD	20,215	20,164
Galikash (city)	20,831	23,394
Yanqaq (city) (Note: Became a city after the 2016 census)		
Total	44,363	47,457
RD = Rural District
