= Galikash District =

Former district in Golestan province, Iran

Galikash District Persian: بخش گالیکش
- Former District
- Location within Iran
- Coordinates: 37°22′N 55°41′E
- Country: Iran
- Province: Golestan
- County: Minudasht
- Established: 1990
- Capital: Galikash

Population (2006)
  - Total: 57,404
- Time zone: UTC+3:30 (IRST)

Galikash District (Persian: بخش گالیکش) is a former administrative division of Minudasht County, Golestan province, Iran. Its capital was the city of Galikash.

== History ==
In 2010, the district was separated from the county in the establishment of Galikash County.

== Demographics ==
=== Population ===
At the time of the 2006 National Census, the district's population was 57,404 in 13,706 households.

=== Administrative divisions ===
Galikash District Population
Administrative Divisions	2006
Nilkuh Rural District	3,239
Qaravolan Rural District	16,202
Yanqaq Rural District	17,954
Galikash (city)	20,009
Total	57,404
