= Galikash County =

County in Golestan province, Iran

Galikash County Persian: شهرستان گالیکش
- County
- Location of Galikash County in Golestan province (right, purple)

- Location of Golestan province in Iran
- Coordinates: 37°22′N 55°41′E
- Country: Iran
- Province: Golestan
- Established: 2010
- Capital: Galikash
- Districts: Central, Loveh

Population (2016)
  - Total: 63,173
- Time zone: UTC+3:30 (IRST)

Galikash County (Persian: شهرستان گالیکش) is in Golestan province, Iran. Its capital is the city of Galikash.

== History ==
In 2010, Galikash District was separated from Minudasht County in the establishment of Galikash County, which was divided into two districts of two rural districts each, with Galikash as its capital and only city at the time.

The village of Sadeqabad was converted to a city in 2018 and Yanqaq became a city in 2023.

== Demographics ==
=== Population ===
At the time of the 2011 National Census, the county's population was 59,975 people in 16,384 households. The 2016 census measured the population of the county as 63,173 in 18,721 households.

=== Administrative divisions ===
Galikash County's population history and administrative structure over two consecutive censuses are shown in the following table.

Galikash County Population
| Administrative Divisions | 2011 | 2016 |
|---|---|---|
| Central District | 44,363 | 47,457 |
| Nilkuh RD | 3,317 | 3,899 |
| Yanqaq RD | 20,215 | 20,164 |
| Galikash (city) | 20,831 | 23,394 |
| Yanqaq (city) (Note: Became a city after the 2016 census) | | |
| Loveh District | 15,612 | 15,716 |
| Golestan RD | 3,930 | 4,002 |
| Qaravolan RD | 11,682 | 11,714 |
| Sadeqabad (city) (Note: Became a city after the 2016 census) | | |
| Total | 59,975 | 63,173 |
RD = Rural District

== See also ==
Media related to Galikash County at Wikimedia Commons
