= List of cities, towns and villages in Golestan province =

A list of cities, towns and villages in Golestan Province of north-eastern Iran:

== Alphabetical ==
Cities are in bold text; all others are villages.

=== A ===
Ab Paran | Abadan Tappeh | Abbasabad | Abbasabad | Abbasabad | Abbasabad-e Amelak | Abeh-ye Golha | Abeh-ye Hajji Nabi Gol Cheshmeh | Abeh-ye Hajji Nazar | Abeh-ye Palang | Abeh-ye Sabzvariha | Afratakhteh | Ahangar Mahalleh | Ahangar Mahalleh | Ahmadabad | Ahmadabad | Ajan Qarah Khvajeh | Ajan Sangarli | Ajan Shir Melli | Ajan Yili | Akbarabad | Akbarabad | Alaman | Alang | Alazman | Alestan | Alhadi | Aliabad-e Katul | Aliabad-e Kenar Shahr | Aliabad-e Sistaniha | Allah Nur | Allahabad | Alqajar | Alti Aghaj-e Bozorg | Alti Aghaj-e Kuchak | Altin Tokhmaq | Alu Kalateh | Alustan | Aman Gal Tappeh | Aman Khujeh | Aman Qarahjeh | Aminabad | Amirabad | Amirabad-e Fenderesk | Amirabad-e Sorkh Mahalleh | Amlak-e Galikash | Anah Hajji | Anbar Olum | Anbar Tappeh | Aq Band | Aq Chali-ye Sofla | Aq Chatal | Aq Dagesh-e Olya | Aq Emam | Aq Qabr | Aq Qala Industrial Park | Aq Qaleh | Aq Qamish | Aq Qayeh | Aq Sin Tappeh | Aq Taqeh-ye Jadid | Aq Taqeh-ye Qadim | Aq Tekeh Khan | Aq Toqeh | Aq Yaji | Aq Zabir | Aqabad | Aqcheh Aqashli | Aqcheli-ye Olya | Aqcheli-ye Qerkhlar | Aqlar | Aqqala | Ara Qui | Arab Buran | Arab Laleh Gun | Arab Qarri Hajji | Arab Sorang | Aram Nerow-e Bala | Aram Nerow-e Pain | Araz Ali Sheykh | Araz Gol | Araz Mohammad Akhund | Araz Taqan | Arfanabad | Arjanli | Arkh-e Bozorg | Arkh-e Kuchek | Arkoli | Armiabad | Arteq Qelich Cheshmeh | Ashurabad | Ashurbay | Ata Behlakeh | Ataabad | Ataabad | Atajan Qorbanli | Atalar | Atra Chal | Avaz Hajji | Ay Darvish | Ay Tamer | Azadshahr | Azadtappeh | Azdar Tappeh | Azdaran | Azdari | Azizabad

=== B ===
Baba Shamalek | Badilabad | Badraq-e Aneh Galdi | Badraq-e Molla | Badraq-e Nuri | Bagh-e Golbon | Bagh-e Sheykh Musa | Bagh-e Yolmeh Salian | Bagheh-ye Shur Tappeh Nafas | Bagheli-ye Marama | Baghu Kenareh | Baghu | Bahalkeh-ye Bayram Akhund | Bahalkeh-ye Dashli | Bahalkeh-ye Nafas | Bahalkeh-ye Sheykh Musa | Bahramabad | Bala Jaddeh | Balam Jerk | Baliqayeh | Balkur | Baluch Imer Mohammad | Baluchabad | Baluchabad | Baluchabad | Baluchabad | Baluchabad-e Mashu | Banafsh Tappeh | Bandar Torkaman | Bandar-e Gaz | Baqerabad | Baqerabad | Baqerabad | Baqi | Baraniha | Barayen | Barbar Qaleh | Barfatan | Basirabad | Bastam Darreh | Baylar | Baynal | Baz Gir | Berenjbon | Besh Evili | Bi Bi Shirvan | Biatlar | Bishak Tappeh | Bishak Tappeh | Bolbol Tappeh | Boluk Ajan | Boluk-e Gholam | Bozaqabad | Buin-e Owzin Qajaq | Buqajeh-ye Bala | Buqajeh-ye Pain

=== C ===
Chahar Bagh | Chahar Chenar | Chahar Deh | Chahar Mazu | Chalaki | Chaleh Polarz | Chalejeh | Chaman Saver | Chamani-ye Bala | Chamani-ye Pain | Chamani-ye Vasat | Chapaqli | Chapar Quymeh | Chaqar Besh Qardash | Chaqar Shir Melli | Charqoli | Charvayolqi | Chatal | Chay Qushan-e Bozorg | Chay Qushan-e Kuchek | Chayli | Cheli-ye Olya | Chenar Qeshlaq | Chenaran | Chenarli | Cheqer | Cheshmeh Ali | Cheshmeh-ye Nil | Chin Sebili | Chinu | Chisht Khujehlar | Chokor Ata | Choruk-e Pishkamar | Chuplani

=== D ===
Dadeh Olum | Dadli-ye Qazneyn | Dahaneh | Dahaneh-ye Porsu Qui | Daland | Damagh | Daneshmand | Dangelan Khvajeh | Dar Asiab | Dar Kalateh | Darabad | Daraz-e Now | Darvishabad | Dashli Arqach | Dashli Borun | Dashli-ye Olya | Dashli-ye Sofla | Dasht Halqeh | Dashti Kalateh-ye Gharbi | Dashti Kalateh-ye Sharqi | Dashti | Davaji | Davud Spahi Dadgar | Deh Abdollah | Deh Chenashk | Deklidash | Delijeh | Deruk | Dikcheh | Do Dangeh | Do Gunchi | Do Jowz | Do Rud Mahalleh | Dowlat Owrlan | Dowzeyn | Dumanli | Durjan

=== E ===
Ebrahimabad | Ebrahimabad | Egri Bughaz | Emam Abdollah | Emamabad-e Sistaniha | Emamiyeh | Ertaq Hajji | Esbu Mahalleh | Esfahan Kalateh | Esferanjan | Eskeleh | Eslam Tappeh | Eslamabad | Eslamabad-e Bala | Eslamabad-e Fenderesk | Eslamabad-e Gonbad | Eslamabad-e Jelin | Eslamabad-e Mazraeh Shomareh-ye Do | Eslamabad-e Mazraeh Shomareh-ye Yek | Eslamabad-e Olya | Eslamabad-e Pain | Eslamabad-e Qeshlaq | Eslamabad-e Shadeh | Eslamabad-e Sofla | Esmailabad | Estunabad | Eyvanabad

=== F ===
Fadavi | Fajr | Fajr | Fakhrabad va Golnad Tariki | Farang | Farq Sar-e Pain | Farsian | Farsian | Fath Bagh | Fathabad | Fazelabad | Fazelabad | Feyzabad | Fujerd

=== G ===
Gadmabad | Galand | Galikash | Gamishli Nazar | Gamishli Yelqi | Gamishli-ye Khvajeh Nafas | Ganu | Gardayesh-e Baluchabad | Garkaz | Gav Mishli | Gavandar | Gaz | Gaz-e Gharbi | Gech Su-ye Bala | Gech Su-ye Pain | Genareh | Geri Doveji | Ghaffar Hajji | Gharavilar | Ghaznavi | Gholamabad | Gilan Tappeh | Gink Lik-e Qarah Sahneh | Gol Afra | Gol Cheshmeh Culture and Technology Centre | Gol Cheshmeh | Golestan | Golidagh | Gomishan | Gonbad-e Qabus | Gonbad-e Qabus Industrial Estate | Gorgan | Gorganduz | Gorji Mahalleh | Guggol | Gugol-e Bozorg | Guk Darreh | Guk Tappeh-ye Shomareh-ye Do | Guk Tappeh-ye Shomareh-ye Yek | Gukjeh | Gunili | Guzan-e Fars | Guzoni Tappeh | Guzoni Tappeh-ye Bala

=== H ===
Habib Ishan | Hadiabad | Hajji Balkhan | Hajji Beyk-e Olya | Hajji Beyk-e Sofla | Hajji Hasan | Hajji Kalateh | Hajji Qareh | Hajji Qelich | Hajji Qushan | Hajjiabad | Hajjiabad | Hajjiabad | Hajjiabad-e Kuh Payeh | Hajjilar Qaleh | Hakimabad | Hali Akhund | Hasan Khan | Hasan Tabib | Hasanabad | Hashemabad | Hashemanli | Hejrat | Hemmatabad | Hemmatabad | Hemmatabad-e Sistaniha | Heydarabad | Heydarabad | Heydarabad-e Mohammad Shir | Hivehchi-ye Bala | Hivehchi-ye Markazi | Hoseyn Kord | Hoseynabad | Hoseynabad | Hoseynabad | Hoseynabad-e Malek | Hoseynabad-e Qorbani | Hoseynabad-e Qorbani | Hoseynabad-e Sistaniha | Hoseynabad-e Tappeh Sari | Howtan

=== I ===
Igder-e Olya | Igder-e Sofla | Ilvar-e Panj Dangeh | Ilvar-e Yek Dangeh | Imer Hajji Allahyar | Imer Mohammad | Imer Molla Sari | Imer Tureh Molla | Imer-e Mohammad Qoli Akhund | Incheh Borun | Ishanlar

=== J ===
Jafa Kandeh | Jafarabad | Jafarabad-e Namtalu | Jahadabad | Jahan Bini | Jahan Nama | Jahan Tigh | Jahanabad-e Olya | Jahanabad-e Sofla | Jalain Tappeh | Jalalabad | Jamaran | Jangal Deh-e Bala | Jangal Deh-e Pain | Jelin-e Olya | Jelin-e Sofla | Jowzchal

=== K ===
Kachik | Kafsh Mahalleh | Kafshgiri | Kaka | Kalaleh | Kalleh Post | Kalu Kand | Kalu | Kalu | Kamalabad | Kamalabad | Kamasi | Kamlar | Kantiri | Kar Kondeh | Karim Ishan | Karim Ishan | Karimabad | Karimabad | Karimabad | Kaser-e Pishkamar | Kashidar | Kaskan Qajaq | Kazem Khvajeh | Kerend | Kesan | Keshkak | Khak-e Pir-e Zan | Khambarabad | Khambarabad | Khambarabad | Khan Bebin | Khan Duz-e Sadat | Khatamabad | Kheyr Khujeh-ye Najaf | Kheyr Khujeh-ye Olya | Kheyr Khujeh-ye Sofla | Kheyrat | Khivali | Khorramabad | Khujeh Galdi | Khujeh Tup | Khujeh Yapaqi | Khujehlar | Khujehlar | Khujomli | Khvajeh Nafas | Khvajehlar | Khvosh Yeylaq | Kiaram | Kohneh Kolbad | Kola Sangian | Kolajan-e Qajar | Kolajan-e Sadat | Kolasareh | Kolijeh | Komorli | Kond Ab | Kondeskuh | Kongor | Korang Kaftar | Kord | Kordabad | Kordkuy | Koruk Chutur | Koveyt Mahalleh | Kowli-ye Bayandor | Kowslar | Kuchak-e Nazar Khani | Kuchek Astajiq | Kuchek Bardikor | Kuchek Dig Seyyed | Kuchek Khortum | Kuchek Olum | Kuchek Yurt Sheykhan | Kuh Kamar | Kuh Mian | Kuh Sahra | Kui Sadaf | Kurekli | Kurlar | Kuruk | Kuseh | Kuzeh Ali

=== L ===
Laldevin | Laleh Bagh | Lamlang | Lamsak | Laysah | Liru | Livan-e Gharbi | Livan-e Sharqi | Lohandar | Loveh | Lulom

=== M ===
Mahian | Mahmudabad | Malashi | Malay Sheykh-e Ginklik | Malek Ali Tappeh | Mamai | Mami Aqcheli | Manjalu | Maraveh Tappeh | Mardom Darreh | Markeh Mahalleh | Marun Kalateh | Maryamabad | Marzan Kalateh | Marzbon | Masankup | Mashu | Masumabad | Masumabad | Masumabad-e Fenderesk | Maziaran | Mazraeh | Mazraeh-ye Ahmad Kasarayi Shomareh-ye Do | Mazraeh-ye Ahmad Kasarayi Shomareh-ye Yek | Mazraeh-ye Ahmad Mohammadi | Mazraeh-ye Ali Eslami Shomareh Yek | Mazraeh-ye Garayili | Mazraeh-ye Garayili | Mazraeh-ye Hajji Asharfian Shomareh Yek | Mazraeh-ye Hajji Milani | Mazraeh-ye Hajji Qasemi | Mazraeh-ye Hajji Rezai | Mazraeh-ye Hoseyn Farid | Mazraeh-ye Karim Jarjani | Mazraeh-ye Khodaqoli Najam ol Din | Mazraeh-ye Mansur Jarjani | Mazraeh-ye Mashtork Mohammadi | Mazraeh-ye Mokhtarzadeh | Mazraeh-ye Nemuneh Artash | Mazraeh-ye Nurjan Shir Mohammadi | Mazraeh-ye Pighmabar Qoli Yolmeh | Mazraeh-ye Qorban Sheykh | Mazraeh-ye Qorban Shir Mohammadi | Mazraeh-ye Sadaqoti | Mazraeh-ye Salman Farsi | Mazraeh-ye Seyyed Niazi | Mazraeh-ye Vahdat | Mazraeh-ye Yezdani | Mehdiabad | Mehdiabad | Mehdiabad | Mehtar Kalateh | Meydan-e Jigh-e Kuchak | Mian Rostaq | Mianabad-e Malek | Miandarreh | Midan Morad | Minudasht | Mir Mahalleh | Mirza Ali-ye Yelqi | Mirza Panak | Mobarakabad | Mofidabad | Mohammad Aleq | Mohammad Aliabad | Mohammad Shahir | Mohammad Zaman Khan | Mohammadabad | Mohammadabad | Mohammadabad | Mohammadabad | Mohammadabad | Mohammadabad | Mohammadabad | Mohammadabad | Mohammadabad | Mohammadabad-e Bala | Mohammadabad-e Pain | Mojaver | Molla Ali Tappeh | Molla Taqi | Moradberdi

=== N ===
Na Alaj | Nahar Khvoran | Naman | Naqiabad | Nar Kalateh | Narges Chal | Narli Aji Su | Narli Dagh | Narrab | Narseh | Nasarkan-e Olya | Nasarkan-e Sofla | Nasrabad | Nazar Chaqli | Neginshahr | Nersu | Ney Tappeh | Niazabad | Nili | Nosratabad | Nosratabad | Now Chaman | Now Deh Garrison | Now Deh Khanduz | Now Deh-e Hajjilar | Now Deh-e Katul | Now Deh-e Malek | Now Deh-e Sharif | Now Kandeh | Nowdijeh | Nowmal | Nurabad

=== O ===
Okhli-ye Bala | Okhli-ye Forugah Farahnak | Okhli-ye Paeen | Omidabad | Osmanabad | Owdak Duji | Owja Bon | Owneq Yelqi-ye Olya | Owneq Yelqi-ye Sofla

=== P ===
Pa Qaleh | Palcheqli | Panj Peykar | Parangal | Parcheqli | Parsah Su | Pas Poshteh | Pasang-e Bala | Pasang-e Pain | Pasgah-e Marzi Pol-e Sharqi | Pashai | Pashehlar | Pashmak Panadeh | Pashmak-e Towq Tamish | Pay Doldol | Penu | Pichak Mahalleh | Pikhi Hajji | Pir Aghach | Piravash-e Olya | Piravash-e Sofla | Piruzabad | Pishkamar | Pol-e Aram | Poli Hajji | Poli-ye Olya | Poli-ye Sofla | Post Darreh

=== Q ===
Qaduneh-ye Olya | Qaduneh-ye Sofla | Qalami | Qalandar Ayesh | Qalandar Mahalleh | Qalandarabad-e Bala | Qalandarabad-e Pain | Qaleh Cheh | Qaleh Jiq | Qaleh Jiq-e Bozorg | Qaleh Jiq-e Kuchek | Qaleh Mahmud | Qaleh Qafeh | Qaleh Qafeh-ye Pain | Qaleh-ye Gomesh Dafeh | Qaleh-ye Hajji Galdi Khan | Qaleh-ye Qarah Jalar | Qanat-e Hajji Taji | Qanjeq-e Shahrak | Qanqormeh | Qapan-e Olya | Qapan-e Sofla | Qaplanli | Qarah Aqachli | Qarah Aqashli | Qarah Bolagh | Qarah Cheshmeh | Qarah Daghli | Qarah Dam-e Yek | Qarah Dang | Qarah Gol-e Gharbi | Qarah Gol-e Kalleh | Qarah Gol-e Sharqi | Qarah Gol-e Takhteh-ye Vasat | Qarah Kasalkheh | Qarah Kileh | Qarah Mohammad Tappeh | Qarah Qach | Qarah Qashli | Qarah Qul-e Tappeh | Qarah Shur | Qarah Tappeh | Qarah Tappeh | Qarah Yasar-e Bala | Qarah Yasar-e Pain | Qarangi-ye Jangal | Qaranjik-e Gukcheli | Qaranjik-e Khavjeh Khan | Qaranjik-e Pur Aman | Qaravol Tappeh | Qaravol-e Hajji Taji | Qareh Aghach | Qareh Jeh | Qareh Makher | Qareh Said | Qareh Su | Qareh Tappeh-ye Sheykh | Qarmaseh | Qarnabad | Qarnaveh-ye Olya | Qarnaveh-ye Sofla | Qarqojoq | Qasemabad-e Yolmeh Salian | Qazan Qayeh | Qazaqoli | Qelaq Burteh | Qereq-e Aq Qamish | Qernaq | Qerqiz | Qeshlaq Coal Mine | Qeshlaq | Qezel Dalq | Qezel Otaq | Qezelcheh-ye Pashmak | Qezeljeh-ye Aq Emam | Qezli | Qizlar | Qoli Tappeh | Qoliabad | Qolmas | Qorban Peykar | Qorban Qelich Molla | Qorbanabad | Qoroq | Quch Morad | Quinli | Quj Maz | Qul Hajji | Qulaq Kasan | Qur Chay | Qur Polcheh | Qurchay | Qusheh Cheshmeh | Qusheh Su | Qusheh Tappeh | Qushjanabad | Qushkorpi | Quy Joq

=== R ===
Radkan | Rahimabad | Rahmatabad | Ramian | Razi | Rezaabad | Rig Cheshmeh | Rig Cheshmeh | Rig Cheshmeh-ye Pain | Rostam Kalateh-ye Sadat | Rudbar | Rusatai-ye Abuzer | Rusatai-ye Anqolab | Rusatai-ye Ashura | Rusatai-ye Belal | Rusatai-ye Chamran | Rusatai-ye Khan Baba Ahmadi | Rusatai-ye Saraleh

=== S ===
Sadabad | Sadabad-e Fenderesk | Sadan | Sadd-e Chamran | Sadeqabad | Sadgorgan va Ettehad Seh | Safa Ishan | Safar Hajji | Safiabad | Sahneh-ye Sofla | Sakhiabad | Salaq Yelqi | Salaq-e Aman Kharlar | Salaq-e Ghayeb | Salaq-e Nuri | Salaq-e Qelich Tappeh | Salaq-e Taj Mohammad | Salaq-e Yasi Tappeh | Salehabad-e Chaqorli | Sali Kandeh | Sanchuliabad | Sangdevin | Sangestan | Saqar Tappeh | Saqar Yelqi | Sar Cheshmeh | Sar Kahriza | Sar Kalateh-ye Kafshgiri | Sar Kalateh-ye Kharab Shahr | Sar Mahalleh | Sar Tappeh | Saray Mohammad Hoseyn | Sar-e Pol | Sari Bakhsh | Sari Qamish | Sarjeh Kor | Sarkhon Kalateh | Sarli Makhtum | Sarli-ye Olya | Sarli-ye Sofla | Sartaq | Sasang | Satleq Bay-ye Zeytunli | Savar Kalateh | Savar-e Bala | Savar-e Pain | Savar-e Vasat | Sayer | Sazeman-e Darya | Sazeman-e Enqelab | Sazeman-e Ettehad Shomareh Yek va Do | Sazeman-e Hajj Seyd | Sazeman-e Heydari | Sazeman-e Miankalleh | Sazeman-e Seyd Ahmad Khomeyni | Sazeman-e Shakrian | Sefid Cheshmeh | Seydabad | Seyyed Kalateh | Seyyed Miran | Seyyedabad | Seyyedlar | Shafiabad | Shaftalu Bagh-e Olya | Shaftalu Bagh-e Sofla | Shahid Qorbani | Shahkuh-e Sofla | Shahrak-e Beheshti | Shahrak-e Golestan Emam Khomeyni | Shahrak-e Jamhuri Eslami | Shahrak-e Vahdat-e Eslami | Shamsabad | Shamushak-e Olya | Shamushak-e Sofla | Sharlaq | Sharlaq | Sherkat-e Sahra | Shesh Ab | Sheykh Tappeh | Sheykhabad-e Yolmeh Salian | Sheykhlar-e Sofla | Shir Aliabad | Shirabad | Shirang-e Olya | Shirang-e Sofla | Shirinabad | Shojaabad | Shur Degesh | Shur Hayat | Shuralang | Shurjah-e Bala | Si Joval | Siah Rudbar | Siahtalu | Sib Chal | Sijan | Siminshahr | Sistani Mahalleh | Soleyman Tappeh | Soltanabad | Someh Makhtum | Sorkhanabad | Sorkhu | Su Sara | Sufi Sheykh | Sufi Sheykh Daz | Sufi Sheykh Gharavi | Sufian | Sujeq | Suteh Deh | Suzesh

=== T ===
Tagak-e Emam Abdollah | Takhshi Mahalleh | Takht | Taleqan Tappeh | Talur | Talustan | Tamer-e Qarah Quzi | Tangeli | Tangrah | Tappeh Nurjan | Tappeh-ye Zohurian | Taqanpay-e Patakeh | Taqiabad | Tarajiq | Tarang Tappeh | Tarjanli | Tarseh | Tashdeh | Tatar Bayjeq | Tatar-e Olya | Tatar-e Sofla | Tazehabad | Tekehlar | Ternavoli-ye Pain | Teymurabad | Tigh Zamin | Tilabad | Tilan | Toqor Tappeh | Torshakli | Towhidabad | Tul Aram | Tumachlar | Tumachlar | Tumachlar-e Altin | Tuqalajiq Tappeh | Tuqqeh | Turan-e Fars | Turan-e Tork | Turang Tappeh | Tushan | Tuska Chal | Tuskastan | Tutli Tamak | Tutli-ye Kuchek

=== U ===
Uch Qui | Uch Tappeh | Ucheran | Ukhi Tappeh | Ulang | Uqchi Bozorg | Uqchi Kuchek | Urkat Hajji

=== V ===
Valaghuz | Valeshabad | Valfara | Valikabad | Vamenan | Varcheshmeh | Varsan | Vatan | Vatana | Viru

=== Y ===
Yalu | Yampi | Yamut | Yan Bolagh | Yanqaq | Yarem Tappeh | Yarti Qaya | Yasaqleq | Yaz Galdi | Yazdan-e Mahallah | Yekeh Sur | Yekkeh Chenar | Yekkeh Quz-e Bala | Yekkeh Quz-e Pain | Yekkeh Tappeh | Yekkeh Tut-e Pain | Yel Cheshmeh-ye Jadid | Yel Cheshmeh-ye Olya | Yel Cheshmeh-ye Sofla | Yelkhi Surlan | Yelli Badraq | Yesaqi | Yisi Mahalleh | Yolmeh Khandan | Yolmeh Salian | Yurt-e Kazem | Yurt-e Zeynal

=== Z ===
Zabihabad | Zaboli Mahallah Qarah Shur | Zaboli Mahalleh-ye Mahastan | Zaboli Mahalleh-ye Olya | Zaboli Mahalleh-ye Sofla | Zaboliabad | Zabolimahalleh-ye Quchmorad | Zamin Shahi | Zangalab | Zangian | Zarrin Gol | Zav-e Bala | Zav-e Pain | Zendan Chal | Zera Mahalleh | Zeynababad | Ziaabad | Ziarat
