= Rig Cheshmeh =

Rig Cheshmeh (Persian: ريگ چشمه) may refer to:

- Rig Cheshmeh, Aliabad, Golestan Province
- Rig Cheshmeh, Minudasht, Golestan Province
- Rig Cheshmeh-ye Pain, Golestan Province
- Rig Cheshmeh, Babol, Mazandaran Province
- Rig Cheshmeh, Sari, Mazandaran Province
