= Bishak Tappeh =

Bishak Tappeh (Persian: بيشك تپه) may refer to:

- Bishak Tappeh, Gonbad-e Qabus, Golestan Province
- Bishak Tappeh, Maraveh Tappeh, Golestan Province
- Bishak Tappeh, Kermanshah
