= Kheyr Khujeh =

Kheyr Khujeh (Persian: خيرخواجه) may refer to:

- Kheyr Khujeh-ye Najaf
- Kheyr Khujeh-ye Olya
- Kheyr Khujeh-ye Sofla
