= Deh Abdollah =

Deh Abdollah or Deh-e Abdollah or Dehabdollah (Persian: ده عبداله) may refer to:

- Deh Abdollah, Golestan
- Deh-e Abdollah, Kerman
- Deh-e Abdollah, Markazi
- Deh-e Abdollah, Sistan and Baluchestan
