= Hejrat =

Hejrat (Persian: هجرت) may refer to:

- Hejrat, Fars
- Hejrat, Golestan
- Hejrat, Kohgiluyeh and Boyer-Ahmad
- A song by Iranian singer Googoosh
