= Qizlar =

Qizlar قيزلر
- Village
- Location within Iran
- Coordinates: 37°48′10″N 54°59′23″E
- Country: Iran
- Province: Golestan
- County: Gonbad-e Qabus
- Bakhsh: Dashli Borun
- Rural District: Atrak

Population (2006)
  - Total: 427
- Time zone: UTC+3:30 (IRST)
  - Summer (DST): UTC+4:30 (IRDT)

Qizlar (Persian: قيزلر, also Romanized as Qīzlar and Qezlar) is a village in Atrak Rural District, Dashli Borun District, Gonbad-e Qabus County, Golestan Province, Iran, near the border with Turkmenistan, to the north. At the 2006 census, its population was 427, in 87 families.
