= Pashehlar =

Pashehlar پشه لر
- Village
- Location within Iran
- Coordinates: 37°41′31″N 55°03′12″E
- Country: Iran
- Province: Golestan
- County: Gonbad-e Qabus
- Bakhsh: Dashli Borun
- Rural District: Atrak

Population (2006)
  - Total: 124
- Time zone: UTC+3:30 (IRST)
  - Summer (DST): UTC+4:30 (IRDT)

Pashehlar (Persian: پشه لر) is a village in Atrak Rural District, Dashli Borun District, Gonbad-e Qabus County, Golestan Province, Iran. At the 2006 census, its population was 124, in 30 families.
