= Jangal Deh =

Jangal Deh (Persian: جنگلده) may refer to:

- Jangal Deh-e Bala
- Jangal Deh-e Pain
