= Qarah Kasalkheh =

Village in Golestan province, Iran

Qarah Kasalkheh قره كسلخه
- Village
- Location within Iran
- Coordinates: 37°20′59″N 54°56′05″E
- Country: Iran
- Province: Golestan
- County: Gonbad-e Qabus
- Bakhsh: Dashli Borun
- Rural District: Atrak

Population (2016)
  - Total: 440
- Time zone: UTC+3:30 (IRST)
  - Summer (DST): UTC+4:30 (IRDT)

Qarah Kasalkheh (Persian: قره كسلخه; also known as Qarah Kasalkheh Qūrīq and Qareh Kasalkheh Qūrīq) is a village in Atrak Rural District, Dashli Borun District, Gonbad-e Qabus County, Golestan Province, Iran. At the 2006 census, its population was 136, in 27 families.
