= Shur Degesh =

Shur Degesh شوردگش
- Village
- Location within Iran
- Coordinates: 37°36′00″N 54°50′00″E
- Country: Iran
- Province: Golestan
- County: Gonbad-e Qabus
- Bakhsh: Dashli Borun
- Rural District: Atrak

Population (2006)
  - Total: 395
- Time zone: UTC+3:30 (IRST)
  - Summer (DST): UTC+4:30 (IRDT)

Shur Degesh (Persian: شوردگش, also Romanized as Shūr Degesh) is a village in Atrak Rural District, Dashli Borun District, Gonbad-e Qabus County, Golestan Province, Iran. At the 2006 census, its population was 395, in 95 families.
