= Damagh =

Damagh دماغ
- Village
- Location within Iran
- Coordinates: 37°50′53″N 55°03′10″E
- Country: Iran
- Province: Golestan
- County: Gonbad-e Qabus
- Bakhsh: Dashli Borun
- Rural District: Atrak

Population (2006)
  - Total: 286
- Time zone: UTC+3:30 (IRST)
  - Summer (DST): UTC+4:30 (IRDT)

Damagh (Persian: دماغ, also Romanized as Damāgh) is a village in Atrak Rural District, Dashli Borun District, Gonbad-e Qabus County, Golestan Province, Iran. As of the 2006 census, its population was 286, consisting of 55 families.
