= Qelaq Burteh =

Qelaq Burteh قلاق بورته
- Village
- Location within Iran
- Coordinates: 37°56′24″N 55°10′47″E
- Country: Iran
- Province: Golestan
- County: Gonbad-e Qabus
- Bakhsh: Dashli Borun
- Rural District: Atrak

Population (2006)
  - Total: 342
- Time zone: UTC+3:30 (IRST)
  - Summer (DST): UTC+4:30 (IRDT)

Qelaq Burteh (Persian: قلاق بورته, also Romanized as Qelāq Būrteh; also known as Qalāqbūrtā, Qalāq Qūrtā, and Qolāq Qūrtā) is a village in Atrak Rural District, Dashli Borun District, Gonbad-e Qabus County, Golestan Province, Iran. At the 2006 census, its population was 342, in 70 families.
