= Ahangar Mahalleh =

Ahangar Mahalleh (Persian: اهنگرمحله) may refer to:

- Ahangar Mahalleh, Gilan
- Ahangar Mahalleh, Gorgan, Golestan Province
- Ahangar Mahalleh, Minudasht, Golestan Province
- Ahangar Mahalleh, alternate name of Tigh Zamin, Golestan Province
