= Sasang =

Sasang may also refer to:

- Sasang District, located in Busan, South Korea
- Sasang Station (disambiguation), stations in Busan, South Korea.
  - Sasang station (Korail)
  - Sasang station (Busan Metro)
- Sasang (village), located in Chehel Chay Rural District, Iran

== See also ==
- Sasang typology
