= Ukhi Tappeh =

Ukhi Tappeh اوخي تپه
- Village
- Location within Iran
- Coordinates: 37°24′42″N 54°42′26″E
- Country: Iran
- Province: Golestan
- County: Gonbad-e Qabus
- Bakhsh: Dashli Borun
- Rural District: Atrak

Population (2006)
  - Total: 296
- Time zone: UTC+3:30 (IRST)
  - Summer (DST): UTC+4:30 (IRDT)

Ukhi Tappeh (Persian: اوخي تپه, also Romanized as Ūkhī Tappeh) is a village in Atrak Rural District, Dashli Borun District, Gonbad-e Qabus County, Golestan Province, Iran. At the 2006 census, its population was 296, in 56 families.
