= Torshakli =

Torshakli ترشكلي
- Village
- Location within Iran
- Coordinates: 37°40′48″N 54°49′10″E
- Country: Iran
- Province: Golestan
- County: Gonbad-e Qabus
- Bakhsh: Dashli Borun
- Rural District: Atrak

Population (2006)
  - Total: 301
- Time zone: UTC+3:30 (IRST)
  - Summer (DST): UTC+4:30 (IRDT)

Torshakli (Persian: ترشكلي, also Romanized as Torshaklī; also known as Tūshkanī) is a village in Atrak Rural District, Dashli Borun District, Gonbad-e Qabus County, Golestan Province, Iran. At the 2006 census, its population was 301, in 58 families.
