= Daneshmand =

Daneshmand may refer to:

- Daneshmand, Iran, a village in Golestan Province, Iran
- Daneshmand (magazine), an Iranian general-science monthly
- ST Daneshmand, originally Empire Sally, a UK-built Iranian tugboat

== People with the surname ==
- Bijan Daneshmand (born 1958), Iranian-born British actor
