= Laysah =

Laysah (Persian: ليسه) may refer to:

- Laysah, Golestan
- Laysah, Mazandaran
