= Dadgar (disambiguation) =

Dadgar refers to a village in Iran. It may also refer to:

- Dadgar (name), list of people with the name
- Dadgar (magazine), Persian legal magazine in Canada
