= Masankup =

Masankup ماسان كوپ
- Village
- Location within Iran
- Coordinates: 37°37′33″N 55°17′35″E
- Country: Iran
- Province: Golestan
- County: Gonbad-e Qabus
- Bakhsh: Dashli Borun
- Rural District: Atrak

Population (2006)
  - Total: 352
- Time zone: UTC+3:30 (IRST)
  - Summer (DST): UTC+4:30 (IRDT)

Masankup (Persian: ماسان كوپ, also Romanized as Māsānḵūp) is a village in Atrak Rural District, Dashli Borun District, Gonbad-e Qabus County, Golestan Province, Iran. At the 2006 census, its population was 352, in 65 families.
