= Kolijeh =

Kolijeh or Kollijah or Kelijeh (Persian: كليجه) may refer to:

- Kolijeh, Golestan
- Kollijah, Hamadan
- Kelijeh, West Azerbaijan
- Kolijeh, an Iranian coat
