= Arteq Qelich Cheshmeh =

Arteq Qelich Cheshmeh ارتق قليچ چشمه
- Village
- Location within Iran
- Coordinates: 37°35′08″N 55°17′41″E
- Country: Iran
- Province: Golestan
- County: Gonbad-e Qabus
- Bakhsh: Dashli Borun
- Rural District: Atrak

Population (2006)
  - Total: 90
- Time zone: UTC+3:30 (IRST)
  - Summer (DST): UTC+4:30 (IRDT)

Arteq Qelich Cheshmeh (Persian: ارتق قليچ چشمه, also Romanized as Ārteq Qelīch Cheshmeh; also known as Ārteqqelīch Cheshmeh) is a village in Atrak Rural District, Dashli Borun District, Gonbad-e Qabus County, Golestan Province, Iran. At the 2006 census, its population was 90, in 20 families.
