= Sar-e Pol =

Sar-e Pol, Sar-i-Pul Sari-Pul or Saripul may refer to the following places:

== Afghanistan ==
- Sar-e Pol Province
- Sar-e Pol District in Sar-e Pol Province
- Sar-e Pol, Afghanistan, capital of Sar-e Pol Province

== Iran ==
- Sar-e Pol, Golestan
- Sar-e Pol, Kerman
- Sar-e Pol, Zanjan

== See also ==
- Sarpol-e Zahab, Kermanshah Province, Iran
- Sarpol-e Zahab County, an administrative subdivision of Iran
