= Aram Nerow =

Aram Nerow (Persian: ارام نرو) may refer to:

- Aram Nerow-e Bala
- Aram Nerow-e Pain
