= Dashli Borun =

Village in Golestan province, Iran

Dashli Borun Persian: داشلي برون
- Village
- Location within Iran
- Coordinates: 37°38′02″N 54°48′56″E
- Country: Iran
- Province: Golestan
- County: Gonbad-e Kavus
- District: Dashli Borun
- Rural District: Atrak

Population (2016)
  - Total: 1,451
- Time zone: UTC+3:30 (IRST)

Dashli Borun (Persian: داشلي برون) (Note: Also romanized as Dāshlī Borūn) is a village in, and the capital of, Atrak Rural District in Dashli Borun District of Gonbad-e Kavus County, Golestan province, Iran.

== Demographics ==
=== Population ===
At the time of the 2006 National Census, the village's population was 970 in 203 households. The following census in 2011 counted 1,266 people in 278 households. The 2016 census measured the population of the village as 1,451 people in 362 households.
