= Kolijeh, Golestan =

Kolijeh كليجه
- Village
- Location within Iran
- Coordinates: 37°55′00″N 55°07′00″E
- Country: Iran
- Province: Golestan
- County: Gonbad-e Qabus
- Bakhsh: Dashli Borun
- Rural District: Atrak

Population (2006)
  - Total: 419
- Time zone: UTC+3:30 (IRST)
  - Summer (DST): UTC+4:30 (IRDT)

Kolijeh (Persian: كليجه, also Romanized as Kolījeh; also known as Kolīcheh) is a village in Atrak Rural District, Dashli Borun District, Gonbad-e Qabus County, Golestan Province, Iran. At the 2006 census, its population was 419, in 86 families.

The population of Kolijeh are Turkmen village. The village is located on the Atrek River. Kolijeh means "black ash places".

Most of the people work in agriculture, with important products including barley, wheat, cattle, sheep, and camels. Turkmen crafts such as carpets and camel cream also bring in money.

Popular sports include football, volleyball, wrestling.
