= Tangeli =

Village in Golestan province, Iran

Tangeli Persian: تنگلي
- Village
- Location within Iran
- Coordinates: 37°25′03″N 54°39′07″E
- Country: Iran
- Province: Golestan
- County: Gonbad-e Kavus
- District: Dashli Borun
- Rural District: Atrak

Population (2016)
  - Total: 1,666
- Time zone: UTC+3:30 (IRST)

Tangeli (Persian: تنگلي) (Note: Also romanized as Tangalī, Tangelī, Tanglī, and Tangolī) is a village in Atrak Rural District of Dashli Borun District in Gonbad-e Kavus County, Golestan province, Iran. It is a border town, located near a crossing point to Turkmenistan.

== Demographics ==
=== Population ===
At the time of the 2006 National Census, the village's population was 1,195 in 243 households. The following census in 2011 counted 1,420 people in 316 households. The 2016 census measured the population of the village as 1,666 people in 456 households.
