= Kheyr Khujeh-ye Najaf =

Kheyr Khujeh-ye Najaf خيرخواجه نجف
- Village
- Location within Iran
- Coordinates: 37°45′00″N 54°54′20″E
- Country: Iran
- Province: Golestan
- County: Gonbad-e Qabus
- Bakhsh: Dashli Borun
- Rural District: Atrak

Population (2006)
  - Total: 159
- Time zone: UTC+3:30 (IRST)
  - Summer (DST): UTC+4:30 (IRDT)

Kheyr Khujeh-ye Najaf (Persian: خيرخواجه نجف, also Romanized as Kheyr Khūjeh-ye Najaf) is a village in Atrak Rural District, Dashli Borun District, Gonbad-e Qabus County, Golestan Province, Iran. At the 2006 census, its population was 159, in 35 families.
