= Kuren =

Kuren may refer to:

- Korand, Golestan, also known as Kuren, a village in Korand Rural District, Golestan Province, Iran
- Kuren (singer), Australian singer
- Kurin (курінь, also kuren), a military and administrative unit of the Zaporizhian Cossacks
