= Fadavi =

Village in Golestan province, Iran

Fadavi Persian: فدوي
- Village
- Location within Iran
- Coordinates: 37°33′51″N 54°50′20″E
- Country: Iran
- Province: Golestan
- County: Gonbad-e Kavus
- District: Dashli Borun
- Rural District: Atrak

Population (2016)
  - Total: 2,101
- Time zone: UTC+3:30 (IRST)

Fadavi (Persian: فدوي) (Note: Also romanized as Fadavī) is a village in Atrak Rural District of Dashli Borun District in Gonbad-e Kavus County, Golestan province, Iran.

== Demographics ==
=== Population ===
At the time of the 2006 National Census, the village's population was 1,733 in 396 households. The following census in 2011 counted 1,890 people in 480 households. The 2016 census measured the population of the village as 2,101 people in 563 households. It was the most populous village in its rural district.
