= Kheyr Khujeh-ye Sofla =

Kheyr Khujeh-ye Sofla خيرخواجه سفلي
- Village
- Location within Iran
- Coordinates: 37°39′00″N 54°57′00″E
- Country: Iran
- Province: Golestan
- County: Gonbad-e Qabus
- Bakhsh: Dashli Borun
- Rural District: Atrak

Population (2006)
  - Total: 218
- Time zone: UTC+3:30 (IRST)
  - Summer (DST): UTC+4:30 (IRDT)

Kheyr Khujeh-ye Sofla (Persian: خيرخواجه سفلي, also Romanized as Kheyr Khūjeh-ye Soflá; also known as Kheyr Khūjeh-ye Pā’īn) is a village in Atrak Rural District, Dashli Borun District, Gonbad-e Qabus County, Golestan Province, Iran. At the 2006 census, its population was 218, in 48 families.
