= Uch Qui =

Village in Golestan province, Iran

Uch Qui Persian: اوچقوئي
- Village
- Location within Iran
- Coordinates: 37°44′22″N 55°14′50″E
- Country: Iran
- Province: Golestan
- County: Gonbad-e Kavus
- District: Dashli Borun
- Rural District: Atrak

Population (2016)
  - Total: 700
- Time zone: UTC+3:30 (IRST)

Uch Qui (Persian: اوچقوئي) (Note: Also romanized as Ūch Qū’ī) is a village in Atrak Rural District of Dashli Borun District in Gonbad-e Kavus County, Golestan province, Iran.

== Demographics ==
=== Population ===
At the time of the 2006 National Census, the village's population was 611 in 98 households. The following census in 2011 counted 609 people in 135 households. The 2016 census measured the population of the village as 700 people in 200 households.
