= Howtan =

Village in Golestan province, Iran

Howtan Persian: هوتن
- Village
- Location within Iran
- Coordinates: 37°56′21″N 55°28′42″E
- Country: Iran
- Province: Golestan
- County: Gonbad-e Kavus
- District: Dashli Borun
- Rural District: Kerend

Population (2016)
  - Total: 2,333
- Time zone: UTC+3:30 (IRST)

Howtan (Persian: هوتن) (Note: Also romanized as Hūtan; also known as Hot Tan) is a village in, and the capital of, Kerend Rural District in Dashli Borun District of Gonbad-e Kavus County, Golestan province, Iran. The previous capital of the rural district was the village of Korand, now a city.

== Demographics ==
=== Population ===
At the time of the 2006 National Census, the village's population was 1,892 in 324 households. The following census in 2011 counted 2,147 people in 517 households. The 2016 census measured the population of the village as 2,333 people in 633 households.
