= Aq Band =

Village in Golestan province, Iran

Aq Band Persian: آقبند
- Village
- Location within Iran
- Coordinates: 37°39′58″N 55°11′15″E
- Country: Iran
- Province: Golestan
- County: Gonbad-e Kavus
- District: Dashli Borun
- Rural District: Atrak

Population (2016)
  - Total: 1,415
- Time zone: UTC+3:30 (IRST)

Aq Band (Persian: آقبند) (Note: Also romanized as Āq Band) is a village in Atrak Rural District of Dashli Borun District in Gonbad-e Kavus County, Golestan province, Iran.

== Demographics ==
=== Population ===
At the time of the 2006 National Census, the village's population was 1,294 in 246 households. The following census in 2011 counted 1,414 people in 357 households. The 2016 census measured the population of the village as 1,415 people in 388 households.
