= Dadeh Olum =

Village in Golestan province, Iran

Dadeh Olum Persian: داده الوم
- Village
- Location within Iran
- Coordinates: 37°57′06″N 55°15′13″E
- Country: Iran
- Province: Golestan
- County: Gonbad-e Kavus
- District: Dashli Borun
- Rural District: Kerend

Population (2016)
  - Total: 238
- Time zone: UTC+3:30 (IRST)

Dadeh Olum (Persian: داده الوم) (Note: Also romanized as Dādeh Olūm; also known as Dadeh and Dādeh Deh) is a village in Kerend Rural District of Dashli Borun District in Gonbad-e Kavus County, Golestan province, Iran.

== Demographics ==
=== Population ===
At the time of the 2006 National Census, the village's population was 289 in 50 households. The following census in 2011 counted 223 people in 51 households. The 2016 census measured the population of the village as 238 people in 62 households.
