= Bishak Tappeh, Gonbad-e Qabus =

Bishak Tappeh بيشك تپه
- Village
- Location within Iran
- Coordinates: 37°28′03″N 54°53′40″E
- Country: Iran
- Province: Golestan
- County: Gonbad-e Qabus
- Bakhsh: Dashli Borun
- Rural District: Atrak

Population (2006)
  - Total: 158
- Time zone: UTC+3:30 (IRST)
  - Summer (DST): UTC+4:30 (IRDT)

Bishak Tappeh (Persian: بيشك تپه, also Romanized as Bīshak Tappeh; also known as Pīshak Tappeh) is a village in Atrak Rural District, Dashli Borun District, Gonbad-e Qabus County, Golestan Province, Iran. At the 2006 census, its population was 158, in 26 families.
