= Qorban Qelich Molla =

Village in Golestan province, Iran

Qorban Qelich Molla Persian: قربان قليچ ملا
- Village
- Location within Iran
- Coordinates: 37°56′25″N 55°20′11″E
- Country: Iran
- Province: Golestan
- County: Gonbad-e Kavus
- District: Dashli Borun
- Rural District: Kerend

Population (2016)
  - Total: 92
- Time zone: UTC+3:30 (IRST)

Qorban Qelich Molla (Persian: قربان قليچ ملا) (Note: Also romanized as Qorbān Qelīch Mollā; also known as Qorbānqelīch) is a village in Kerend Rural District of Dashli Borun District in Gonbad-e Kavus County, Golestan province, Iran.

== Demographics ==
=== Population ===
At the time of the 2006 National Census, the village's population was 80 in 14 households. The following census in 2011 counted 79 people in 13 households. The 2016 census measured the population of the village as 92 people in 22 households.
