= Daneshmand, Iran =

Daneshmand دانشمند
- Village
- Location within Iran
- Coordinates: 37°30′19″N 54°47′04″E
- Country: Iran
- Province: Golestan
- County: Gonbad-e Qabus
- Bakhsh: Dashli Borun
- Rural District: Atrak

Population (2006)
  - Total: 230
- Time zone: UTC+3:30 (IRST)
  - Summer (DST): UTC+4:30 (IRDT)

Daneshmand (Persian: دانشمند, also Romanized as Dāneshmand) is a village in Atrak Rural District, Dashli Borun District, Gonbad-e Qabus County, Golestan Province, Iran. At the 2006 census, its population was 230, in 46 families.
