= Kuh Kamar =

Kuh Kamar or Kooh Kamar (Persian: كوه كمر) may refer to:

- Kuh Kamar, East Azerbaijan
- Kuh Kamar, Golestan
- Kuh Kamar, North Khorasan
