= Ay Tamer =

Village in Golestan province, Iran

Ay Tamer Persian: آی تمر
- Village
- Location within Iran
- Coordinates: 37°48′49″N 55°28′18″E
- Country: Iran
- Province: Golestan
- County: Gonbad-e Kavus
- District: Dashli Borun
- Rural District: Kerend

Population (2016)
  - Total: 1,151
- Time zone: UTC+3:30 (IRST)

Ay Tamer is a village in Kerend Rural District of Dashli Borun District in Gonbad-e Kavus County, Golestan province, Iran.

== Demographics ==
=== Population ===
At the time of the 2006 National Census, the village's population was 1,004 in 210 households. The following census in 2011 counted 1,103 people in 245 households. The 2016 census measured the population of the village as 1,151 people in 309 households.
