= Narli Dagh =

Village in Golestan province, Iran

Narli Dagh Persian: نارلي داغ
- Village
- Location within Iran
- Coordinates: 37°44′27″N 55°16′45″E
- Country: Iran
- Province: Golestan
- County: Gonbad-e Kavus
- District: Dashli Borun
- Rural District: Atrak

Population (2016)
  - Total: 862
- Time zone: UTC+3:30 (IRST)

Narli Dagh (Persian: نارلي داغ) (Note: Also romanized as Nārlī Dāgh; also known as Nārlī) is a village in Atrak Rural District of Dashli Borun District in Gonbad-e Kavus County, Golestan province, Iran.

== Demographics ==
=== Population ===
At the time of the 2006 National Census, the village's population was 668 in 106 households. The following census in 2011 counted 797 people in 167 households. The 2016 census measured the population of the village as 862 people in 227 households.
