= Qareh Makher =

Village in Golestan province, Iran

Qareh Makher Persian: قره ماخر
- Village
- Location within Iran
- Coordinates: 37°31′31″N 54°58′21″E
- Country: Iran
- Province: Golestan
- County: Gonbad-e Kavus
- District: Dashli Borun
- Rural District: Atrak

Population (2016)
  - Total: 1,304
- Time zone: UTC+3:30 (IRST)

Qareh Makher (Persian: قره ماخر) (Note: Also romanized as Qareh Mākher; also known as Ghareh Māklher, Qarah Mākhvor, and Qareh Mākhūr) is a village in Atrak Rural District of Dashli Borun District in Gonbad-e Kavus County, Golestan province, Iran.

== Demographics ==
=== Population ===
At the time of the 2006 National Census, the village's population was 1,100 in 236 households. The following census in 2011 counted 1,158 people in 281 households. The 2016 census measured the population of the village as 1,304 people in 351 households.
