= Voshmgir =

Voshmgir (Persian: وَشمگير) may refer to:

- Voshmgir, alternate name of Pichak Mahalleh
- Voshmgir District
