= Ataabad =

Ataabad (Persian: عطااباد) may refer to:

- Ataabad, Fars
- Ataabad, Aqqala, Golestan Province
- Ataabad, Gonbad-e Qabus, Golestan Province
