= Midan Morad =

Midan Morad ميدان مراد
- Village
- Country: Iran
- Province: Golestan
- County: Gonbad-e Qabus
- Bakhsh: Central
- Rural District: Bagheli-ye Marama

Population (2006)
  - Total: 128
- Time zone: UTC+3:30 (IRST)
  - Summer (DST): UTC+4:30 (IRDT)

Midan Morad (Persian: ميدان مراد, also Romanized as Mīdān Morād) is a village in Bagheli-ye Marama Rural District, in the Central District of Gonbad-e Qabus County, Golestan Province, Iran. At the 2006 census, its population was 128, in 27 families.
