= Imer Hajji Allahyar =

Imer Hajji Allahyar ايمرحاجي الهيار
- Village
- Location within Iran
- Coordinates: 37°07′27″N 54°51′03″E
- Country: Iran
- Province: Golestan
- County: Gonbad-e Qabus
- Bakhsh: Central
- Rural District: Bagheli-ye Marama

Population (2006)
  - Total: 366
- Time zone: UTC+3:30 (IRST)
  - Summer (DST): UTC+4:30 (IRDT)

Imer Hajji Allahyar (Persian: ايمرحاجي الهيار, also Romanized as Īmer Ḩājjī Allāhyār; also known as Īmer Khvājeh Allāhyār) is a village in Bagheli-ye Marama Rural District, in the Central District of Gonbad-e Qabus County, Golestan Province, Iran. At the 2006 census, its population was 366, in 79 families.
