= Do Jowz =

Do Jowz دوجوز
- Village
- Location within Iran
- Coordinates: 37°04′54″N 55°30′31″E
- Country: Iran
- Province: Golestan
- County: Minudasht
- Bakhsh: Central
- Rural District: Qaleh Qafeh

Population (2016)
  - Total: 133
- Time zone: UTC+3:30 (IRST)

Do Jowz (Persian: دوجوز) is a village in Qaleh Qafeh Rural District, in the Central District of Minudasht County, Golestan Province, Iran.

At the time of the 2006 National Census, the village's population, was 145 in 37 households. The following census in 2011 counted 145 people in 39 households. The 2016 census measured the population of the village as 133 people in 41 households.
