= Kuchek Bardikor =

Kuchek Bardikor كوچك بردئ كر
- Village
- Location within Iran
- Coordinates: 37°05′23″N 54°55′50″E
- Country: Iran
- Province: Golestan
- County: Gonbad-e Qabus
- Bakhsh: Central
- Rural District: Bagheli-ye Marama

Population (2006)
  - Total: 138
- Time zone: UTC+3:30 (IRST)
  - Summer (DST): UTC+4:30 (IRDT)

Kuchek Bardikor (Persian: كوچك بردئ كر, also Romanized as Kūcheḵ Bardikor; also known as Bardikor) is a village in Bagheli-ye Marama Rural District, in the Central District of Gonbad-e Qabus County, Golestan Province, Iran. At the 2006 census, its population was 138, in 34 families.
