= Yekeh Sur =

Yekeh Sur يكه سور
- Village
- Location within Iran
- Coordinates: 37°10′00″N 55°28′00″E
- Country: Iran
- Province: Golestan
- County: Minudasht
- Bakhsh: Central
- Rural District: Qaleh Qafeh

Population (2016)
  - Total: 113
- Time zone: UTC+3:30 (IRST)

Yekeh Sur (Persian: يكه سور, also Romanized as Yekeh Sūr) is a village in Qaleh Qafeh Rural District, in the Central District of Minudasht County, Golestan Province, Iran.

At the time of the 2006 National Census, the village's population, was 102 in 23 households. The following census in 2011 counted 104 people in 25 households. The 2016 census measured the population of the village as 113 people in 29 households.
