= Qaravol Tappeh =

Qaravol Tappeh قراول‌تپه
- Village
- Location within Iran
- Coordinates: 37°16′20″N 55°06′24″E
- Country: Iran
- Province: Golestan
- County: Gonbad-e Qabus
- Bakhsh: Central
- Rural District: Soltanali

Population (2006)
  - Total: 378
- Time zone: UTC+3:30 (IRST)
  - Summer (DST): UTC+4:30 (IRDT)

Qaravol Tappeh (Persian: قراول‌تپه, also Romanized as Qarāvol Tappeh) is a village in Soltanali Rural District, in the Central District of Gonbad-e Qabus County, Golestan Province, Iran. At the 2006 census, its population was 378, in 87 families.
