= Omidabad, Golestan =

Omidabad اميدآباد
- Village
- Location within Iran
- Coordinates: 37°14′55″N 54°55′36″E
- Country: Iran
- Province: Golestan
- County: Gonbad-e Qabus
- Bakhsh: Central
- Rural District: Soltanali

Population (2006)
  - Total: 740
- Time zone: UTC+3:30 (IRST)
  - Summer (DST): UTC+4:30 (IRDT)

Omidabad (Persian: اميدآباد, also Romanized as Omīdābād; also known as Omīdābād-e Yesirgechan) is a village in Soltanali Rural District, in the Central District of Gonbad-e Qabus County, Golestan Province, Iran. At the 2006 census, its population was 740, in 148 families.
