= Quj Maz =

Neighborhood in Golestan province, Iran

Quj Maz Persian: قوجمز
- Neighborhood
- Location within Iran
- Coordinates: 37°23′46″N 55°30′33″E
- Country: Iran
- Province: Golestan
- County: Kalaleh
- District: Central
- City: Kalaleh

Population (2011)
  - Total: 2,476
- Time zone: UTC+3:30 (IRST)

Quj Maz (Persian: قوجمز) (Note: Also romanized as Qūj Maz; also known as Qūjeh Maz) is a neighborhood in the city of Kalaleh in the Central District of Kalaleh County, Golestan province, Iran.

== Demographics ==
=== Population ===
At the time of the 2006 National Census, Quj Maz's population was 1,807 in 355 households, when it was a village in Aq Su Rural District. The following census in 2011 counted 2,476 people in 633 households. After the census, Quj Maz was annexed by the city of Kalaleh.
