= Zamin Shahi =

Zamin Shahi زمین شاهی
- Village
- Location within Iran
- Coordinates: 37°04′15″N 55°29′40″E
- Country: Iran
- Province: Golestan
- County: Minudasht
- Bakhsh: Central
- Rural District: Qaleh Qafeh

Population (2016)
  - Total: 198
- Time zone: UTC+3:30 (IRST)

Zamin Shahi (Persian: زمین شاهی, also Romanized as Zamīn Shāhī; also known as Zamīn Shāh) is a village in Qaleh Qafeh Rural District, in the Central District of Minudasht County, Golestan Province, Iran.

At the time of the 2006 National Census, the village's population, was 260 in 59 households. The following census in 2011 counted 238 people in 66 households. The 2016 census measured the population of the village as 198 people in 64 households.
