= Dadgar (name) =

Dadgar is a surname of Persian origin. Notable people with the surname include:

- Azadeh Bokaie Dadgar (born 1980), Iranian lawyer and journalist
- Hossein Dadgar (1889–1971), Iranian politician

== See also ==
- Dadgar (disambiguation)
