= Zaboli Mahalleh-ye Quchmorad =

Zabolimahalleh-ye Quchmorad زابلي محله قوچ مراد
- Village
- Location within Iran
- Coordinates: 37°10′58″N 54°52′17″E
- Country: Iran
- Province: Golestan
- County: Gonbad-e Qabus
- Bakhsh: Central
- Rural District: Bagheli-ye Marama

Population (2006)
  - Total: 449
- Time zone: UTC+3:30 (IRST)
  - Summer (DST): UTC+4:30 (IRDT)

Zabolimahalleh-ye Quchmorad (Persian: زابلي محله قوچ مراد, also Romanized as Zābolīmaḥalleh-ye Qūchmorād) is a village in Bagheli-ye Marama Rural District, in the Central District of Gonbad-e Qabus County, Golestan Province, Iran. At the 2006 census, its population was 449, in 102 families.
