= Cheshmeh-ye Nil =

Cheshmeh-ye Nil چشمه نيل
- Village
- Location within Iran
- Coordinates: 37°23′00″N 55°29′00″E
- Country: Iran
- Province: Golestan
- County: Kalaleh
- Bakhsh: Central
- City: Kalaleh

Population (2016)
  - Total: 339
- Time zone: UTC+3:30 (IRST)

Cheshmeh-ye Nil (Persian: چشمه نيل, also Romanized as Cheshmeh-ye Nīl) is a northern suburb of Kalaleh city in the Central District of Kalaleh County, Golestan Province, Iran.

It was formerly a village in Kongor Rural District, annexed by the city in 2017.

At the time of the 2006 National Census, the village's population was 301 in 68 households. The following census in 2011 counted 324 people in 86 households. The 2016 census measured the population of the village as 339 people in 95 households.
