= Abeh-ye Palang =

Abeh-ye Palang ابه پلنگ
- Village
- Location within Iran
- Coordinates: 37°05′15″N 54°54′18″E
- Country: Iran
- Province: Golestan
- County: Gonbad-e Qabus
- Bakhsh: Central
- Rural District: Bagheli-ye Marama

Population (2006)
  - Total: 390
- Time zone: UTC+3:30 (IRST)
  - Summer (DST): UTC+4:30 (IRDT)

Abeh-ye Palang (Persian: ابه پلنگ, also Romanized as Ābeh-ye Palang; also known as Oveh Palang and Oveh Paknak) is a village in Bagheli-ye Marama Rural District, in the Central District of Gonbad-e Qabus County, Golestan Province, Iran. At the 2006 census, its population was 390, in 91 families.
