= Kerend Rural District (Gonbad-e Kavus County) =

Rural district in Golestan province, Iran

Kerend Rural District Persian: دهستان كرند
- Rural District
- Location within Iran
- Coordinates: 37°56′N 55°26′E
- Country: Iran
- Province: Golestan
- County: Gonbad-e Kavus
- District: Dashli Borun
- Established: 1987
- Capital: Howtan

Population (2016)
  - Total: 9,443
- Time zone: UTC+3:30 (IRST)

Kerend Rural District (Persian: دهستان كرند) is in Dashli Borun District of Gonbad-e Kavus County, Golestan province, Iran. Its capital is the village of Howtan. The previous capital of the rural district was the village of Korand, now a city.

== Demographics ==
=== Population ===
At the time of the 2006 National Census, the rural district's population was 7,607 in 1,567 households. There were 8,511 inhabitants in 2,080 households at the following census of 2011. The 2016 census measured the population of the rural district as 9,443 in 2,558 households. The most populous of its eight villages was Korand (now a city), with 5,616 people.

=== Other villages in the rural district ===
- Ay Tamer
- Dadeh Olum
- Qorban Qelich Molla
