= Kafsh Mahalleh =

Kafsh Mahalleh كفش محله
- Village
- Location within Iran
- Coordinates: 37°03′22″N 55°29′37″E
- Country: Iran
- Province: Golestan
- County: Minudasht
- Bakhsh: Central
- Rural District: Qaleh Qafeh

Population (2016)
  - Total: 196
- Time zone: UTC+3:30 (IRST)

Kafsh Mahalleh (Persian: كفش محله, also Romanized as Kafsh Maḩalleh; also known as Kanesh Maḩalleh) is a village in Qaleh Qafeh Rural District, in the Central District of Minudasht County, Golestan Province, Iran.

At the time of the 2006 National Census, the village's population, was 244 in 62 households. The following census in 2011 counted 201 people in 60 households. The 2016 census measured the population of the village as 196 people in 60 households.
