= Mohammadabad, Gonbad-e Qabus =

Mohammadabad محمدآباد
- Village
- Location within Iran
- Coordinates: 37°04′31″N 54°54′46″E
- Country: Iran
- Province: Golestan
- County: Gonbad-e Qabus
- Bakhsh: Central
- Rural District: Bagheli-ye Marama

Population (2006)
  - Total: 148
- Time zone: UTC+3:30 (IRST)
  - Summer (DST): UTC+4:30 (IRDT)

Mohammadabad (Persian: محمدآباد, also Romanized as Moḩammadābād) is a village in Bagheli-ye Marama Rural District, in the Central District of Gonbad-e Qabus County, Golestan Province, Iran. At the 2006 census, its population was 148, in 31 families.
