= Now Deh-e Katul =

Now Deh-e Katul نوده كتول
- Neighborhood
- Location within Iran
- Coordinates: 36°54′58″N 54°50′50″E
- Country: Iran
- Province: Golestan
- County: Aliabad
- Bakhsh: Central
- City: Aliabad-e Katul

Population (2011)
  - Total: 1,004
- Time zone: UTC+3:30 (IRST)

Now Deh-e Katul (Persian: نوده كتول, also Romanized as Now Deh-e Katūl) is a neighborhood in the city of Aliabad-e Katul, Golestan Province, Iran. It is northwest of the city center, with Pichak Mahalleh village to its west.

It was formerly a village in Katul Rural District, in the Central District of Aliabad County. At the 2011 census, its population was 1004, in 493 families.
