= Khujomli =

Khujomli خوجملي
- Village
- Location within Iran
- Coordinates: 37°14′00″N 55°08′00″E
- Country: Iran
- Province: Golestan
- County: Gonbad-e Qabus
- Bakhsh: Central
- Rural District: Soltanali

Population (2006)
  - Total: 353
- Time zone: UTC+3:30 (IRST)
  - Summer (DST): UTC+4:30 (IRDT)

Khujomli (Persian: خوجملي, also Romanized as Khūjomlī and Khoojamli; also known as Khojom Bardī-ye Aqdasī and Kojun) is a village in Soltanali Rural District, in the Central District of Gonbad-e Qabus County, Golestan Province, Iran. At the 2006 census, its population was 353, in 72 families.
