= Kheyr Khujeh-ye Olya =

Village in Golestan province, Iran

Kheyr Khujeh-ye Olya Persian: خيرخواجه عليا
- Village
- Location within Iran
- Coordinates: 37°46′41″N 54°58′00″E
- Country: Iran
- Province: Golestan
- County: Gonbad-e Kavus
- District: Dashli Borun
- Rural District: Atrak

Population (2016)
  - Total: 591
- Time zone: UTC+3:30 (IRST)

Kheyr Khujeh-ye Olya (Persian: خيرخواجه عليا) (Note: Also romanized as Kheyr Khūjeh-ye ‘Olyā; also known as Kheyr Khūjeh-ye Bālā) is a village in Atrak Rural District of Dashli Borun District in Gonbad-e Kavus County, Golestan province, Iran.

== Demographics ==
=== Population ===
At the time of the 2006 National Census, the village's population was 463 in 94 households. The following census in 2011 counted 428 people in 116 households. The 2016 census measured the population of the village as 591 people in 166 households.
