= Ay Darvish =

Neighborhood in Golestan province, Iran

Ay Darvish Persian: آيدرويشا
- Neighborhood
- Location within Iran
- Coordinates: 37°22′38″N 55°30′15″E
- Country: Iran
- Province: Golestan
- County: Kalaleh
- District: Central
- City: Kalaleh

Population (2011)
  - Total: 2,222
- Time zone: UTC+3:30 (IRST)

Ay Darvish (Persian: آيدرويش) (Note: Also romanized as Āy Darvīsh) is a neighborhood in the city of Kalaleh in the Central District of Kalaleh County, Golestan province, Iran.

== Demographics ==
=== Population ===
At the time of the 2006 National Census, Ay Darvish's population was 2,254 in 457 households, when it was a village in Aq Su Rural District. The following census in 2011 counted 2,222 people in 557 households. After the census, Ay Darvish was annexed by the city of Kalaleh.
