= Salaq-e Taj Mohammad =

Salaq-e Taj Mohammad سلاق تاج محمد
- Village
- Location within Iran
- Coordinates: 37°10′33″N 54°57′40″E
- Country: Iran
- Province: Golestan
- County: Gonbad-e Qabus
- Bakhsh: Central
- Rural District: Bagheli-ye Marama

Population (2006)
  - Total: 397
- Time zone: UTC+3:30 (IRST)
  - Summer (DST): UTC+4:30 (IRDT)

Salaq-e Taj Mohammad (Persian: سلاق تاج محمد, also Romanized as Salāq-e Tāj Moḩammad) is a village in Bagheli-ye Marama Rural District, in the Central District of Gonbad-e Qabus County, Golestan Province, Iran. At the 2006 census, its population was 397, in 79 families.
