= Khormarud-e Shomali Rural District =

Rural district in Golestan province, Iran

Khormarud-e Shomali Rural District Persian: دهستان خرمارود شمالي
- Rural District
- Location within Iran
- Coordinates: 37°04′N 55°13′E
- Country: Iran
- Province: Golestan
- County: Azadshahr
- District: Central
- Established: 2001
- Capital: Azdar Tappeh

Population (2016)
  - Total: 14,586
- Time zone: UTC+3:30 (IRST)

Khormarud-e Shomali Rural District (Persian: دهستان خرمارود شمالي) is in the Central District of Azadshahr County, Golestan province, Iran. Its capital is the village of Azdar Tappeh.

== Demographics ==
=== Population ===
At the time of the 2006 National Census, the rural district's population was 11,805 in 2,844 households. There were 13,016 inhabitants in 3,894 households at the following census of 2011. The 2016 census measured the population of the rural district as 14,586 in 4,431 households. The most populous of its 10 villages was Azdar Tappeh, with 4,687 people.

=== Other villages in the rural district ===
- Akbarabad
- Fazelabad
- Khan Duz-e Sadat
- Kuh Mian
- Marzbon
- Nili
- Sar Kahriza
- Seyyedabad
- Tilan
