= Sar Kahriza =

Village in Golestan province, Iran

Sar Kahriza Persian: سركهريزا
- Village
- Location within Iran
- Coordinates: 37°04′37″N 55°12′47″E
- Country: Iran
- Province: Golestan
- County: Azadshahr
- District: Central
- Rural District: Khormarud-e Shomali

Population (2016)
  - Total: 336
- Time zone: UTC+3:30 (IRST)

Sar Kahriza (Persian: سركهريزا) (Note: Also romanised as Sar Kahrīzā; also known as Sar Kahzā) is a village in Khormarud-e Shomali Rural District of the Central District in Azadshahr County, Golestan province, Iran.

== Demographics ==
=== Population ===
At the time of the 2006 National Census, the village's population was 295 in 79 households. The following census in 2011 counted 268 people in 83 households. The 2016 census measured the population of the village as 336 people in 96 households.
