= Zendan Chal =

Village in Golestan province, Iran

Zendan Chal Persian: زندان چال
- Village
- Location within Iran
- Coordinates: 37°05′37″N 55°28′39″E
- Country: Iran
- Province: Golestan
- County: Minudasht
- District: Central
- Rural District: Qaleh Qafeh

Population (2016)
  - Total: 292
- Time zone: UTC+3:30 (IRST)

Zendan Chal (Persian: زندان چال) (Note: Also romanized as Zendān Chāl) is a village in Qaleh Qafeh Rural District of the Central District in Minudasht County, Golestan province, Iran.

== Demographics ==
=== Population ===
At the time of the 2006 National Census, the village's population was 364 in 108 households. The following census in 2011 counted 298 people in 101 households. The 2016 census measured the population of the village as 292 people in 100 households.
