= Marzbon =

Village in Golestan province, Iran

Marzbon Persian: مرزبن
- Village
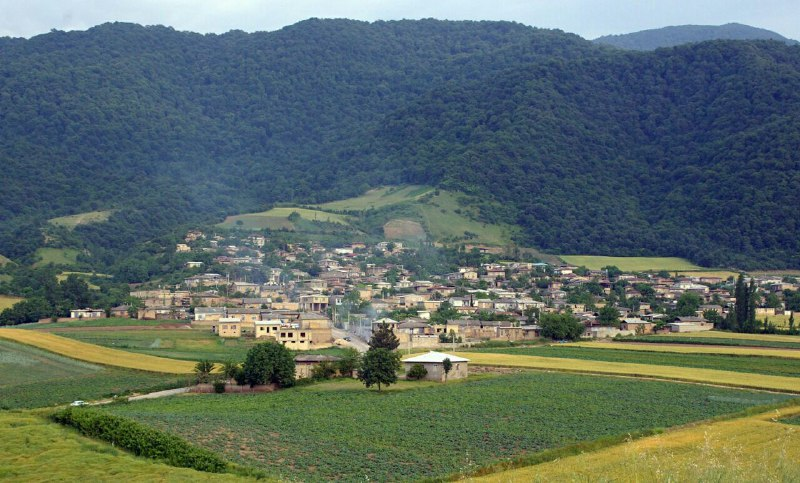
- View of Marzbon

- Location within Iran
- Coordinates: 37°03′42″N 55°13′46″E
- Country: Iran
- Province: Golestan
- County: Azadshahr
- District: Central
- Rural District: Khormarud-e Shomali

Population (2016)
  - Total: 1,480
- Time zone: UTC+3:30 (IRST)

Marzbon (Persian: مرزبن) (Note: Also known as Marzīn) is a village in Khormarud-e Shomali Rural District of the Central District in Azadshahr County, Golestan province, Iran.

== Demographics ==
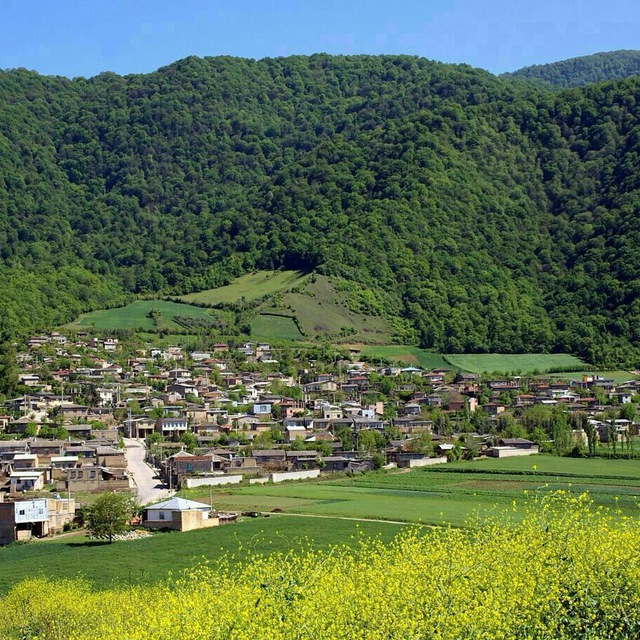

=== Population ===
At the time of the 2006 National Census, the village's population was 1,469 in 391 households. The following census in 2011 counted 1,531 people in 454 households. The 2016 census measured the population of the village as 1,480 people in 487 households.
