= Azdaran =

Azdaran ازداران
- Village
- Location within Iran
- Coordinates: 37°04′29″N 55°23′49″E
- Country: Iran
- Province: Golestan
- County: Minudasht
- Bakhsh: Central
- Rural District: Chehel Chay

Population (2016)
  - Total: 108
- Time zone: UTC+3:30 (IRST)

Azdaran (Persian: ازداران, also Romanized as Azdārān) is a village in Chehel Chay Rural District, in the Central District of Minudasht County, Golestan Province, Iran.

At the time of the 2006 National Census, the village's population was 185 in 54 households. The following census in 2011 counted 109 people in 38 households. The 2016 census measured the population of the village as 108 people in 37 households.
