= Deh-e Abdollah, Markazi =

Deh-e Abdollah ده عبداله
- Village
- Location within Iran
- Coordinates: 33°47′04″N 49°02′01″E
- Country: Iran
- Province: Markazi
- County: Shazand
- Bakhsh: Sarband
- Rural District: Malmir

Population (2006)
  - Total: 50
- Time zone: UTC+3:30 (IRST)
  - Summer (DST): UTC+4:30 (IRDT)

Deh-e Abdollah (Persian: ده عبداله, also Romanized as Deh-e ‘Abdollāh and Deh ‘Abdollāh; also known as Deh ‘Abdullāh and Deh Rezā) is a village in Malmir Rural District, Sarband District, Shazand County, Markazi Province, Iran. At the 2006 census, its population was 50, in 13 families.
