= Balam Jerk =

Village in Golestan province, Iran

Balam Jerk Persian: بلمجرک
- Village
- Location within Iran
- Coordinates: 37°04′37″N 55°27′49″E
- Country: Iran
- Province: Golestan
- County: Minudasht
- District: Central
- Rural District: Qaleh Qafeh

Population (2016)
  - Total: 642
- Time zone: UTC+3:30 (IRST)

Balam Jerk (Persian: بلمجرک) (Note: Also known as Balam Jerīk) is a village in Qaleh Qafeh Rural District of the Central District in Minudasht County, Golestan province, Iran.

== Demographics ==
=== Population ===
At the time of the 2006 National Census, the village's population was 576 in 184 households. The following census in 2011 counted 627 people in 209 households. The 2016 census measured the population of the village as 642 people in 214 households.
