= Incheh Borun =

City in Golestan province, Iran

Incheh Borun Persian: اينچه برون
- City
- Location within Iran
- Coordinates: 37°27′16″N 54°43′04″E
- Country: Iran
- Province: Golestan
- County: Gonbad-e Kavus
- District: Dashli Borun

Population (2016)
  - Total: 2,494
- Time zone: UTC+3:30 (IRST)

Incheh Borun (Persian: اينچه برون) (Note: Also romanized as ‘Īncheh Borūn) is a city in, and the capital of, Dashli Borun District in Gonbad-e Kavus County, Golestan province, Iran.

== Demographics ==
=== Population ===
At the time of the 2006 National Census, the city's population was 1,764 in 334 households. The following census in 2011 counted 2,281 people in 487 households. The 2016 census measured the population of the city as 2,494 people in 593 households.
