= Zangalab =

Zangalab زنگلاب
- Village
- Location within Iran
- Coordinates: 37°11′00″N 55°26′00″E
- Country: Iran
- Province: Golestan
- County: Minudasht
- Bakhsh: Central
- Rural District: Chehel Chay

Population (2006)
  - Total: 298
- Time zone: UTC+3:30 (IRST)
  - Summer (DST): UTC+4:30 (IRDT)

Zangalab (Persian: زنگلاب, also Romanized as Zangalāb) is a village in Chehel Chay Rural District, in the Central District of Minudasht County, Golestan Province, Iran. At the 2006 census, its population was 298, in 76 families.
