= Yekkeh Chenar =

Yekkeh Chenar يكه چنار
- Village
- Location within Iran
- Coordinates: 37°49′57″N 56°05′05″E
- Country: Iran
- Province: Golestan
- County: Maraveh Tappeh
- Bakhsh: Central
- Rural District: Maraveh Tappeh

Population (2006)
  - Total: 330
- Time zone: UTC+3:30 (IRST)
  - Summer (DST): UTC+4:30 (IRDT)

Yekkeh Chenar (Persian: يكه چنار, also Romanized as Yekkeh Chenār) is a village in Maraveh Tappeh Rural District, in the Central District of Maraveh Tappeh County, Golestan Province, Iran. At the 2006 census, its population was 330, in 68 families.
