= Aqcheh Aqashli =

Aqcheh Aqashli آقچه آقاشلي
- Village
- Location within Iran
- Coordinates: 37°36′58″N 55°57′59″E
- Country: Iran
- Province: Golestan
- County: Maraveh Tappeh
- Bakhsh: Golidagh
- Rural District: Golidagh

Population (2006)
  - Total: 418
- Time zone: UTC+3:30 (IRST)
  - Summer (DST): UTC+4:30 (IRDT)

Aqcheh Aqashli (Persian: آقچه آقاشلي, also Romanized as Āqcheh Āqāshlī, Āqcheh Āghāshlī, and Āqcheh Āghāchlī) is a village in Golidagh Rural District, Golidagh District, Maraveh Tappeh County, Golestan Province, Iran. At the 2006 census, its population was 418, in 86 families.
