= Qaleh Cheh, Golestan =

Qaleh Cheh قلعه چه
- Village
- Location within Iran
- Coordinates: 37°09′29″N 55°24′04″E
- Country: Iran
- Province: Golestan
- County: Minudasht
- Bakhsh: Central
- Rural District: Chehel Chay

Population (2006)
  - Total: 78
- Time zone: UTC+3:30 (IRST)
  - Summer (DST): UTC+4:30 (IRDT)

Qaleh Cheh (Persian: قلعه چه, also Romanized as Qal‘eh Cheh) is a village in Chehel Chay Rural District, in the Central District of Minudasht County, Golestan Province, Iran. At the 2006 census, its population was 78, in 23 families.
