= Qarah Aqachli =

Qarah Aqachli قره اقاچلي
- Village
- Location within Iran
- Coordinates: 37°52′38″N 55°48′26″E
- Country: Iran
- Province: Golestan
- County: Maraveh Tappeh
- Bakhsh: Central
- Rural District: Maraveh Tappeh

Population (2006)
  - Total: 202
- Time zone: UTC+3:30 (IRST)
  - Summer (DST): UTC+4:30 (IRDT)

Qarah Aqachli (Persian: قره اقاچلي, also Romanized as Qarah Āqāchlī; also known as Qarah Qāshlī) is a village in Maraveh Tappeh Rural District, in the Central District of Maraveh Tappeh County, Golestan Province, Iran. At the 2006 census, its population was 202, in 44 families.
