= Deruk, Golestan =

Village in Golestan province, Iran

Deruk Persian: دروک
- Village
- Location within Iran
- Coordinates: 37°06′57″N 55°29′53″E
- Country: Iran
- Province: Golestan
- County: Minudasht
- District: Central
- Rural District: Qaleh Qafeh

Population (2016)
  - Total: 204
- Time zone: UTC+3:30 (IRST)

Deruk (Persian: دروک) (Note: Also romanized as Derūk) is a village in Qaleh Qafeh Rural District of the Central District in Minudasht County, Golestan province, Iran.

== Demographics ==
=== Population ===
At the time of the 2006 National Census, the village's population was 269 in 76 households. The following census in 2011 counted 210 people in 61 households. The 2016 census measured the population of the village as 204 people in 57 households.
