= Sanchuliabad =

Sanchuliabad سنچولي اباد
- Village
- Location within Iran
- Coordinates: 37°12′00″N 55°18′00″E
- Country: Iran
- Province: Golestan
- County: Minudasht
- Bakhsh: Central
- Rural District: Chehel Chay

Population (2006)
  - Total: 372
- Time zone: UTC+3:30 (IRST)
  - Summer (DST): UTC+4:30 (IRDT)

Sanchuliabad (Persian: سنچولي اباد, also Romanized as Sanchūlīābād; also known as Sanchūlīābād-e Qalamī) is a village in Chehel Chay Rural District, in the Central District of Minudasht County, Golestan Province, Iran. At the 2006 census, its population was 372, in 75 families.

This place is situated in Mazandaran, Iran, and its original name (with diacritics) is Sanchūlīābād-e Qalamī.
