= Kuh Mian =

Village in Golestan province, Iran

Kuh Mian Persian: كوه ميان
- Village
- Location within Iran
- Coordinates: 37°01′57″N 55°12′07″E
- Country: Iran
- Province: Golestan
- County: Azadshahr
- District: Central
- Rural District: Khormarud-e Shomali

Population (2016)
  - Total: 405
- Time zone: UTC+3:30 (IRST)

Kuh Mian (Persian: كوه ميان) (Note: Also romanized as Kūh Meyān and Kūh Mīān) is a village in Khormarud-e Shomali Rural District of the Central District in Azadshahr County, Golestan province, Iran.

== Demographics ==
=== Population ===
At the time of the 2006 National Census, the village's population was 387 in 98 households. The following census in 2011 counted 413 people in 125 households. The 2016 census measured the population of the village as 405 people in 131 households.
