= Dadgar (magazine) =

Persian law magazine in Canada

Dadgar (Persian: دادگر, lit. 'righteous, just') is a monthly law magazine published in Toronto, Ontario, Canada. It was launched in 2013. Contributors of the magazine are mostly journalists and legal advisors who publish articles on the changes in the Canadian legal system and on the social and legal issues related to Iranian-Canadians. It offers both Persian and English language articles.
