= Tul Aram =

Tul Aram طول ارام
- Village
- Location within Iran
- Coordinates: 37°10′54″N 55°27′44″E
- Country: Iran
- Province: Golestan
- County: Minudasht
- Bakhsh: Central
- Rural District: Chehel Chay

Population (2006)
  - Total: 203
- Time zone: UTC+3:30 (IRST)
  - Summer (DST): UTC+4:30 (IRDT)

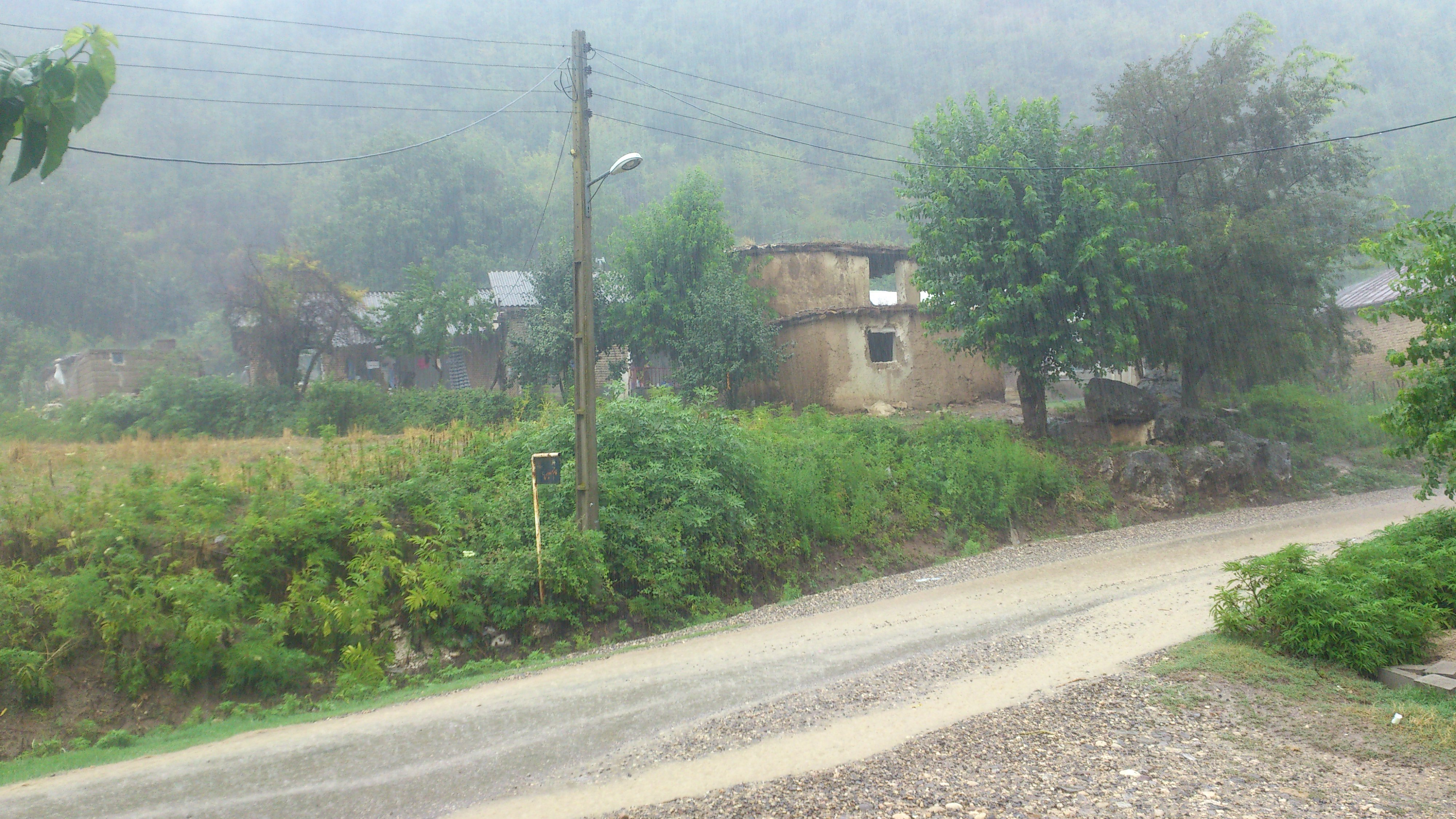
Ţūl Ārām (2017)

Tul Aram (Persian: طول ارام, also Romanized as Ţūl Ārām; also known as Lūleh Rām) is a village in Chehel Chay Rural District, in the Central District of Minudasht County, Golestan Province, Iran. At the 2006 census, its population was 203, in 47 families.
