= Qarah Qul-e Tappeh =

Qarah Qul-e Tappeh قره قول تپه
- Village
- Country: Iran
- Province: Golestan
- County: Maraveh Tappeh
- Bakhsh: Central
- Rural District: Maraveh Tappeh

Population (2006)
  - Total: 262
- Time zone: UTC+3:30 (IRST)
  - Summer (DST): UTC+4:30 (IRDT)

Qarah Qul-e Tappeh (Persian: قره قول تپه, also Romanized as Qarah Qūl-e Tappeh) is a village in Maraveh Tappeh Rural District, in the Central District of Maraveh Tappeh County, Golestan Province, Iran. At the 2006 census, its population was 262, in 52 families.
