= Daneshmand (magazine) =

Persian-language science magazine

- Editor: Alireaza Hatami
- Categories: Science
- Frequency: Monthly
- Founded: 1963; 63 years ago
- Country: Iran
- Based in: Tehran
- Language: Persian
- Website: daneshmandonline.ir
- ISSN: 1011-3495
- OCLC: 10216790

Daneshmand (Persian: دانشمند, lit. 'Scientist') is a Persian-language monthly general science magazine covering recent developments in science and technology for a general Iranian audience. The magazine is published in Tehran, Iran.

== History and profile ==
Founded in 1963, Daneshmand was published by Daneshmand R&D institute, a subsidiary of Reed Elsevier. Following the Islamic revolution in Iran in 1979 the magazine was closed. In 1984 it was restarted under the ownership of the Mostazafen Foundation of Islamic Revolution.

Daneshmand is published on a monthly basis. It has its headquarters in Tehran. As well as covering current events and news from the scientific community, the magazine often features speculative articles, ranging from the technical to the philosophical. It is not a peer-reviewed scientific journal, but it is read by both scientists and non-scientists, as a way of keeping track of developments outside their own fields of study or areas of interest.

Since the beginning of the year 2015, this publication has been edited by Seyed Hamed Asgari, director of the Ministry of Education and Research, Mohammad Javad Torabi, who has served as editor in this publication for less than a year. Currently, Alireza Hatami is the editor in Chief of this magazine, Naser Foroozesh is the Junior Editor of this monthly magazine. There is also a Daneshmand who has set up his own website.
