= Gabrestan =

Gabrestan گبرستان
- Village
- Location within Iran
- Coordinates: 30°37′52″N 50°44′10″E
- Country: Iran
- Province: Kohgiluyeh and Boyer-Ahmad
- County: Gachsaran
- Bakhsh: Central
- Rural District: Boyer Ahmad-e Garmsiri

Population (2006)
  - Total: 147
- Time zone: UTC+3:30 (IRST)
  - Summer (DST): UTC+4:30 (IRDT)

Gabrestan (Persian: گبرستان, also Romanized as Gabrestān; also known as Hejrat) is a village in Boyer Ahmad-e Garmsiri Rural District, in the Central District of Gachsaran County, Kohgiluyeh and Boyer-Ahmad Province, Iran. At the 2006 census, its population was 147, in 25 families.
