= Qarah Dam-e Yek =

Qarah Dam-e Yek قره دام يك
- Village
- Location within Iran
- Coordinates: 37°53′44″N 55°55′48″E
- Country: Iran
- Province: Golestan
- County: Maraveh Tappeh
- Bakhsh: Central
- Rural District: Maraveh Tappeh

Population (2006)
  - Total: 170
- Time zone: UTC+3:30 (IRST)
  - Summer (DST): UTC+4:30 (IRDT)

Qarah Dam-e Yek (Persian: قره دام يك, also Romanized as Qarah Dām-e Yeḵ; also known as Qarah Dām) is a village in Maraveh Tappeh Rural District, in the Central District of Maraveh Tappeh County, Golestan Province, Iran. At the 2006 census, its population was 170, in 36 families.
