= Balkur =

Balkur بالكور
- Village
- Location within Iran
- Coordinates: 37°48′31″N 56°01′38″E
- Country: Iran
- Province: Golestan
- County: Maraveh Tappeh
- Bakhsh: Central
- Rural District: Maraveh Tappeh

Population (2006)
  - Total: 105
- Time zone: UTC+3:30 (IRST)
  - Summer (DST): UTC+4:30 (IRDT)

Balkur (Persian: بالكور, also Romanized as Bālkūr) is a village in Maraveh Tappeh Rural District, in the Central District of Maraveh Tappeh County, Golestan Province, Iran. At the 2006 census, its population was 105, in 24 families.

Balkur is also a place of Udupi District of India and also a place of Uthara Kannada District of India. Balkur is a large village located in Kundapura of Udupi district, Karnataka with total 584 families residing. The Balkur village has population of 2998 of which 1416 are males while 1582 are females as per Population Census 2011.
