= Hejrat, Fars =

Hejrat هجرت
- Village
- Location within Iran
- Coordinates: 29°58′53″N 51°49′38″E
- Country: Iran
- Province: Fars
- County: Mamasani
- Bakhsh: Doshman Ziari
- Rural District: Mashayekh

Population (2006)
  - Total: 814
- Time zone: UTC+3:30 (IRST)
  - Summer (DST): UTC+4:30 (IRDT)

Hejrat (Persian: هجرت) is a village in Mashayekh Rural District, Doshman Ziari District, Mamasani County, Fars province, Iran. At the 2006 census, its population was 814, in 184 families.
