= Shurjah-e Bala =

Shurjah-e Bala شورجه بالا
- Village
- Location within Iran
- Coordinates: 37°52′12″N 55°49′53″E
- Country: Iran
- Province: Golestan
- County: Maraveh Tappeh
- Bakhsh: Central
- Rural District: Maraveh Tappeh

Population (2006)
  - Total: 131
- Time zone: UTC+3:30 (IRST)
  - Summer (DST): UTC+4:30 (IRDT)

Shurjah-e Bala (Persian: شورجه بالا, also Romanized as Shūrjah-e Bālā) is a village in Maraveh Tappeh Rural District, in the Central District of Maraveh Tappeh County, Golestan Province, Iran. At the 2006 census, its population was 131, in 30 families.
