= Sar-e Pol, Kerman =

Sar-e Pol سرپل
- Village
- Location within Iran
- Coordinates: 29°52′22″N 56°11′46″E
- Country: Iran
- Province: Kerman
- County: Bardsir
- Bakhsh: Central
- Rural District: Kuh Panj

Population (2006)
  - Total: 19
- Time zone: UTC+3:30 (IRST)
  - Summer (DST): UTC+4:30 (IRDT)

Sar-e Pol (Persian: سرپل; also known as Sar-e Po) is a village in Kuh Panj Rural District, in the Central District of Bardsir County, Kerman Province, Iran. At the 2006 census, its population was 19, in 5 families.
