= Ataabad, Gonbad-e Qabus =

Ataabad عطاآباد
- Village
- Location within Iran
- Coordinates: 37°00′45″N 54°34′31″E
- Country: Iran
- Province: Golestan
- County: Gonbad-e Qabus
- Bakhsh: Central
- Rural District: Soltanali

Population (2006)
  - Total: 152
- Time zone: UTC+3:30 (IRST)
  - Summer (DST): UTC+4:30 (IRDT)

Ataabad (Persian: عطاآباد, also Romanized as ’Atāābād and ’Atā Ābād) is a village in Soltanali Rural District, in the Central District of Gonbad-e Qabus County, Golestan Province, Iran. At the 2006 census, its population was 152, in 26 families.
