= Rig Cheshmeh-ye Pain =

Rig Cheshmeh-ye Pain ريگ چشمه پايين
- Village
- Location within Iran
- Coordinates: 37°07′34″N 55°28′18″E
- Country: Iran
- Province: Golestan
- County: Minudasht
- Bakhsh: Central
- Rural District: Qaleh Qafeh

Population (2016)
  - Total: 113
- Time zone: UTC+3:30 (IRST)

Rig Cheshmeh-ye Pain (Persian: ريگ چشمه پايين, also Romanized as Rīg Cheshmeh-ye Pā’īn; also known as Rīgcheshmeh-ye Paeen) is a village in Qaleh Qafeh Rural District, in the Central District of Minudasht County, Golestan Province, Iran.

At the time of the 2006 National Census, the village's population, was 111 in 30 households. The following census in 2011 counted 86 people in 29 households. The 2016 census measured the population of the village as 113 people in 40 households.
