= Kantiri =

Kantiri كنت يري
- Village
- Location within Iran
- Coordinates: 37°38′00″N 55°55′00″E
- Country: Iran
- Province: Golestan
- County: Maraveh Tappeh
- Bakhsh: Golidagh
- Rural District: Golidagh

Population (2006)
  - Total: 463
- Time zone: UTC+3:30 (IRST)
  - Summer (DST): UTC+4:30 (IRDT)

Kantiri (Persian: كنت يري, also Romanized as Kantīrī and Kandīrī) is a village in Golidagh Rural District, Golidagh District, Maraveh Tappeh County, Golestan Province, Iran. At the 2006 census, its population was 463, in 83 families.
