= Davud Spahi Dadgar =

Davud Spahi Dadgar داودئ سپاهي دادگر
- Village
- Country: Iran
- Province: Golestan
- County: Gonbad-e Qabus
- Bakhsh: Central
- Rural District: Bagheli-ye Marama

Population (2006)
  - Total: 300
- Time zone: UTC+3:30 (IRST)
  - Summer (DST): UTC+4:30 (IRDT)

Davud Spahi Dadgar (Persian: داودئ سپاهي دادگر, also Romanized as Dāvūd Spāhī Dādgar) is a village in Bagheli-ye Marama Rural District, in the Central District of Gonbad-e Qabus County, Golestan Province, Iran. At the 2006 census, its population was 300, in 70 families.
