= Deh-e Abdollah, Kerman =

Deh-e Abdollah ده عبدالله
- Village
- Location within Iran
- Coordinates: 30°27′23″N 56°37′27″E
- Country: Iran
- Province: Kerman
- County: Kerman
- Bakhsh: Chatrud
- Rural District: Kavirat

Population (2006)
  - Total: 28
- Time zone: UTC+3:30 (IRST)
  - Summer (DST): UTC+4:30 (IRDT)

Deh-e Abdollah (Persian: ده عبدالله, also Romanized as Deh-e ʿAbdollah and Dehabdollah) is a village in Kavirat Rural District, Chatrud District, Kerman County, Kerman Province, Iran. At the 2006 census, its population was 28, in 9 families.
