= Baba Shamalek =

Baba Shamalek باباشملك
- Village
- Location within Iran
- Coordinates: 37°48′17″N 55°53′21″E
- Country: Iran
- Province: Golestan
- County: Maraveh Tappeh
- Bakhsh: Central
- Rural District: Maraveh Tappeh

Population (2006)
  - Total: 325
- Time zone: UTC+3:30 (IRST)
  - Summer (DST): UTC+4:30 (IRDT)

Baba Shamalek (Persian: باباشملك, also Romanized as Bābā Shamalek) is a village in Maraveh Tappeh Rural District, in the Central District of Maraveh Tappeh County, Golestan Province, Iran. At the 2006 census, its population was 325, in 59 families.
