= Varcheshmeh =

Village in Golestan province, Iran

Varcheshmeh Persian: ورچشمه
- Village
- Location within Iran
- Coordinates: 37°03′43″N 55°30′18″E
- Country: Iran
- Province: Golestan
- County: Minudasht
- District: Central
- Rural District: Qaleh Qafeh

Population (2016)
  - Total: 227
- Time zone: UTC+3:30 (IRST)

Varcheshmeh (Persian: ورچشمه) is a village in Qaleh Qafeh Rural District of the Central District in Minudasht County, Golestan province, Iran.

== Demographics ==
=== Population ===
At the time of the 2006 National Census, the village's population was 216 in 50 households. The following census in 2011 counted 218 people in 57 households. The 2016 census measured the population of the village as 227 people in 64 households.
