= Dashli Arqach =

Dashli Arqach داشلي ارقاچ
- Village
- Location within Iran
- Coordinates: 37°36′52″N 55°56′58″E
- Country: Iran
- Province: Golestan
- County: Maraveh Tappeh
- Bakhsh: Golidagh
- Rural District: Golidagh

Population (2006)
  - Total: 248
- Time zone: UTC+3:30 (IRST)
  - Summer (DST): UTC+4:30 (IRDT)

Dashli Arqach (Persian: داشلي ارقاچ, also Romanized as Dāshlī Arqāch and Dāshlī Ārqāch) is a village in Golidagh Rural District, Golidagh District, Maraveh Tappeh County, Golestan Province, Iran. At the 2006 census, its population was 248, in 43 families.
