= Komorli =

Komorli كمرلي
- Village
- Location within Iran
- Coordinates: 37°39′35″N 55°55′53″E
- Country: Iran
- Province: Golestan
- County: Maraveh Tappeh
- Bakhsh: Golidagh
- Rural District: Golidagh

Population (2006)
  - Total: 323
- Time zone: UTC+3:30 (IRST)
  - Summer (DST): UTC+4:30 (IRDT)

Komorli (Persian: كمرلي, also Romanized as Komorlī) is a village in Golidagh Rural District, Golidagh District, Maraveh Tappeh County, Golestan Province, Iran. At the 2006 census, its population was 323, in 69 families.
