= Kuh Kamar, Golestan =

Kuh Kamar كوه كمر
- Village
- Location within Iran
- Coordinates: 37°05′08″N 55°28′16″E
- Country: Iran
- Province: Golestan
- County: Minudasht
- Bakhsh: Central
- Rural District: Qaleh Qafeh

Population (2016)
  - Total: 68
- Time zone: UTC+3:30 (IRST)

Kuh Kamar (Persian: كوه كمر, also Romanized as Kūh Kamar) is a village in Qaleh Qafeh Rural District, in the Central District of Minudasht County, Golestan Province, Iran.

At the time of the 2006 National Census, the village's population, was 100 in 30 households. The following census in 2011 counted 76 people in 27 households. The 2016 census measured the population of the village as 68 people in 22 households.
