= Na Alaj =

Na Alaj ناعلاج
- Village
- Location within Iran
- Coordinates: 37°11′00″N 55°25′00″E
- Country: Iran
- Province: Golestan
- County: Minudasht
- Bakhsh: Central
- Rural District: Chehel Chay

Population (2006)
  - Total: 20
- Time zone: UTC+3:30 (IRST)
  - Summer (DST): UTC+4:30 (IRDT)

Na Alaj (Persian: ناعلاج, also Romanized as Nā ‘Alāj) is a village in Chehel Chay Rural District, in the Central District of Minudasht County, Golestan Province, Iran. At the 2006 census, its population was 20, in 8 families.
