= Deklidash =

Deklidash دكلي داش
- Village
- Location within Iran
- Coordinates: 37°49′13″N 55°52′43″E
- Country: Iran
- Province: Golestan
- County: Maraveh Tappeh
- Bakhsh: Central
- Rural District: Maraveh Tappeh

Population (2006)
  - Total: 211
- Time zone: UTC+3:30 (IRST)
  - Summer (DST): UTC+4:30 (IRDT)

Deklidash (Persian: دكلي داش, also Romanized as Deklīdāsh; also known as Dīklī Dāsh) is a village in Maraveh Tappeh Rural District, in the Central District of Maraveh Tappeh County, Golestan Province, Iran. At the 2006 census, its population was 211, in 43 families.
