= Qaleh Qafeh-ye Pain =

Village in Golestan province, Iran

Qaleh Qafeh-ye Pain Persian: قلعه قافه پايين
- Village
- Location within Iran
- Coordinates: 37°02′34″N 55°29′10″E
- Country: Iran
- Province: Golestan
- County: Minudasht
- District: Central
- Rural District: Qaleh Qafeh

Population (2016)
  - Total: 669
- Time zone: UTC+3:30 (IRST)

Qaleh Qafeh-ye Pain (Persian: قلعه قافه پايين) (Note: Also romanized as Qal‘eh Qāfeh-ye Pā’īn) is a village in Qaleh Qafeh Rural District of the Central District in Minudasht County, Golestan province, Iran.

== Demographics ==
=== Population ===
At the time of the 2006 National Census, the village's population was 930 in 233 households. The following census in 2011 counted 775 people in 217 households. The 2016 census measured the population of the village as 669 people in 209 households.
