= Markeh Mahalleh =

Markeh Mahalleh معركه محله
- Village
- Location within Iran
- Coordinates: 37°08′01″N 55°21′43″E
- Country: Iran
- Province: Golestan
- County: Minudasht
- Bakhsh: Central
- Rural District: Chehel Chay

Population (2006)
  - Total: 372
- Time zone: UTC+3:30 (IRST)
  - Summer (DST): UTC+4:30 (IRDT)

Markeh Mahalleh (Persian: معركه محله, also Romanized as Markeh Maḩalleh; also known as Markī Maḩalleh) is a village in Chehel Chay Rural District, in the Central District of Minudasht County, Golestan Province, Iran. At the 2006 census, its population was 372, in 92 families.
