= Hejrat, Golestan =

Hejrat هجرت
- Village
- Location within Iran
- Coordinates: 37°17′00″N 54°58′10″E
- Country: Iran
- Province: Golestan
- County: Gonbad-e Qabus
- Bakhsh: Central
- Rural District: Soltanali

Population (2006)
  - Total: 93
- Time zone: UTC+3:30 (IRST)
  - Summer (DST): UTC+4:30 (IRDT)

Hejrat (Persian: هجرت; also known as Mazra‘eh-ye Rūḥānī) is a village in Soltanali Rural District, in the Central District of Gonbad-e Qabus County, Golestan Province, Iran. At the 2006 census, its population was 93, in 19 families.
