= Qezel Otaq =

Qezel Otaq قزل اطاق
- Village
- Location within Iran
- Coordinates: 37°37′49″N 55°46′56″E
- Country: Iran
- Province: Golestan
- County: Maraveh Tappeh
- Bakhsh: Golidagh
- Rural District: Golidagh

Population (2006)
  - Total: 275
- Time zone: UTC+3:30 (IRST)
  - Summer (DST): UTC+4:30 (IRDT)

Qezel Otaq (Persian: قزل اطاق, also Romanized as Qezel Oţāq; also known as Qezel Atav’ārab) is a village in Golidagh Rural District, Golidagh District, Maraveh Tappeh County, Golestan Province, Iran. At the 2006 census, its population was 275, in 53 families.
