= Qaleh Qafeh-ye Bala =

Village in Golestan province, Iran

Qaleh Qafeh-ye Bala Persian: قلعه قافه بالا
- Village
- Location within Iran
- Coordinates: 37°02′35″N 55°29′35″E
- Country: Iran
- Province: Golestan
- County: Minudasht
- District: Central
- Rural District: Qaleh Qafeh

Population (2016)
  - Total: 1,409
- Time zone: UTC+3:30 (IRST)

Qaleh Qafeh-ye Bala (Persian: قلعه قافه بالا) (Note: Also romanized as Qal’eh Qafeh-ye Bālā; formerly known as Qaleh Qafeh (قلعه قافه), also romanized as Qal’eh Qafeh) is a village in, and the capital of, Qaleh Qafeh Rural District in the Central District of Minudasht County, Golestan province, Iran.

== Demographics ==
=== Population ===
At the time of the 2006 National Census, the village's population, as Qaleh Qafeh, was 1,326 in 317 households. The following census in 2011 counted 1,596 people in 386 households, by which time the village was listed as Qaleh Qafeh-ye Bala. The 2016 census measured the population of the village as 1,409 people in 388 households. It was the most populous village in its rural district.
