= Kollijah, Hamadan =

Kollijah كليجه
- Village
- Location within Iran
- Coordinates: 35°12′00″N 49°03′00″E
- Country: Iran
- Province: Hamadan
- County: Razan
- Bakhsh: Central
- Rural District: Razan

Population (2006)
  - Total: 171
- Time zone: UTC+3:30 (IRST)
  - Summer (DST): UTC+4:30 (IRDT)

Kollijah (Persian: كليجه, also Romanized as Kollījah) is a village in Razan Rural District, in the Central District of Razan County, Hamadan Province, Iran. At the 2006 census, its population was 171, in 42 families.
