= Qezel Dalq =

Qezel Dalq قزل دالق
- Village
- Location within Iran
- Coordinates: 37°54′39″N 55°59′45″E
- Country: Iran
- Province: Golestan
- County: Maraveh Tappeh
- Bakhsh: Central
- Rural District: Maraveh Tappeh

Population (2006)
  - Total: 100
- Time zone: UTC+3:30 (IRST)
  - Summer (DST): UTC+4:30 (IRDT)

Qezel Dalq (Persian: قزل دالق, also Romanized as Qezel Dālq) is a village in Maraveh Tappeh Rural District, in the Central District of Maraveh Tappeh County, Golestan Province, Iran. At the 2006 census, its population was 100, in 23 families.
