= Ahangar Mahalleh, Minudasht =

Ahangar Mahalleh آهنگرمحله
- Village
- Location within Iran
- Coordinates: 37°04′40″N 55°30′00″E
- Country: Iran
- Province: Golestan
- County: Minudasht
- Bakhsh: Central
- Rural District: Qaleh Qafeh

Population (2016)
  - Total: 49
- Time zone: UTC+3:30 (IRST)

Ahangar Mahalleh (Persian: آهنگرمحله, also Romanized as Āhangar Maḩalleh) is a village in Qaleh Qafeh Rural District, in the Central District of Minudasht County, Golestan Province, Iran.

At the time of the 2006 National Census, the village's population, was 72 in 13 households. The following census in 2011 counted 52 people in 15 households. The 2016 census measured the population of the village as 49 people in 13 households.
