= Qarah Aqashli =

Qarah Aqashli قره آقاشلي
- Village
- Location within Iran
- Coordinates: 37°36′40″N 55°55′24″E
- Country: Iran
- Province: Golestan
- County: Maraveh Tappeh
- Bakhsh: Golidagh
- Rural District: Golidagh

Population (2006)
  - Total: 95
- Time zone: UTC+3:30 (IRST)
  - Summer (DST): UTC+4:30 (IRDT)

Qarah Aqashli (Persian: قره آقاشلي, also romanized as Qarah Āqāshlī and Qareh Āqāshlī) is a village in Golidagh Rural District, Golidagh District, Maraveh Tappeh County, Golestan Province, Iran. At the 2006 census its population was 95, in 18 families.
