= Sasang station =

Sasang station (Korean: 사상역; Hanja: 沙上驛) is the name of several railroad stations in Busan, South Korea.

- Sasang station (Korail)
- Sasang station (Busan Metro)
