= Qaplanli =

Coordinates: 37.6650°N 55.8929°E

Qaplanli قاپلانلي
- Village
- Interactive map of Qaplanli
- Country: Iran
- Province: Golestan
- County: Maraveh Tappeh
- Bakhsh: Golidagh
- Rural District: Golidagh

Population (2006)
  - Total: 145
- Time zone: UTC+3:30 (IRST)
  - Summer (DST): UTC+4:30 (IRDT)

Qaplanli (Persian: قاپلانلي, also Romanized as Qāplānlī) is a village in Golidagh Rural District, Golidagh District, Maraveh Tappeh County, Golestan Province, Iran. At the 2006 census, its population was 145, in 28 families.
