= Qanat-e Hajji Taji =

Qanat-e Hajji Taji قنات حاجی تاجی
- Village
- Location within Iran
- Coordinates: 37°19′34″N 55°29′41″E
- Country: Iran
- Province: Golestan
- County: Galikash
- Bakhsh: Central
- Rural District: Yanqaq

Population (2016)
  - Total: 248
- Time zone: UTC+3:30 (IRST)

Qanat-e Hajji Taji (Persian: قنات حاجی تاجی, also Romanized as Qanāt-e Ḩājjī Tājī; also known as Qanāt-e Ḩājitājī) is a village and commercial hub in Yanqaq Rural District (formerly in Qaravolan Rural District) of Galikash County, Golestan Province, Iran. At the 2016 census, its population was 248, in 74 families.
