= Yaz Galdi =

Yaz Galdi يازگلدي
- Village
- Location within Iran
- Coordinates: 37°54′21″N 56°01′10″E
- Country: Iran
- Province: Golestan
- County: Maraveh Tappeh
- Bakhsh: Central
- Rural District: Maraveh Tappeh

Population (2006)
  - Total: 259
- Time zone: UTC+3:30 (IRST)
  - Summer (DST): UTC+4:30 (IRDT)

Yaz Galdi (Persian: يازگلدي, also Romanized as Yāz Galdī) is a village in Maraveh Tappeh Rural District, in the Central District of Maraveh Tappeh County, Golestan Province, Iran. At the 2006 census, its population was 259, in 52 families.
