= Tilan =

Village in Golestan province, Iran

Tilan Persian: تيلان
- Village
- Location within Iran
- Coordinates: 37°04′21″N 55°09′29″E
- Country: Iran
- Province: Golestan
- County: Azadshahr
- District: Central
- Rural District: Khormarud-e Shomali

Population (2016)
  - Total: 798
- Time zone: UTC+3:30 (IRST)

Tilan (Persian: تيلان) (Note: Also romanized as Tīlān) is a village in Khormarud-e Shomali Rural District of the Central District in Azadshahr County, Golestan province, Iran.

== Demographics ==
=== Population ===
At the time of the 2006 National Census, the village's population was 649 in 149 households. The following census in 2011 counted 779 people in 218 households. The 2016 census measured the population of the village as 798 people in 223 households.
