= Bijak Tappeh =

Bijak Tappeh بيجك تپه
- Village
- Location within Iran
- Coordinates: 33°52′49″N 47°11′22″E
- Country: Iran
- Province: Kermanshah
- County: Kermanshah
- Bakhsh: Firuzabad
- Rural District: Osmanvand

Population (2006)
  - Total: 17
- Time zone: UTC+3:30 (IRST)
  - Summer (DST): UTC+4:30 (IRDT)

Bijak Tappeh (Persian: بيجك تپه, also Romanized as Bījak Tappeh; also known as Bīshak Tappeh) is a village in Osmanvand Rural District, Firuzabad District, Kermanshah County, Kermanshah Province, Iran. At the 2006 census, its population was 17, in 4 families.
