= Seyyedabad, Golestan =

Village in Golestan province, Iran

Seyyedabad Persian: سيداباد
- Village
- Location within Iran
- Coordinates: 37°06′57″N 55°15′01″E
- Country: Iran
- Province: Golestan
- County: Azadshahr
- District: Central
- Rural District: Khormarud-e Shomali

Population (2016)
  - Total: 1,484
- Time zone: UTC+3:30 (IRST)

Seyyedabad (Persian: سيداباد) (Note: Also romanized as Seyyedābād) is a village in Khormarud-e Shomali Rural District of the Central District in Azadshahr County, Golestan province, Iran.

== Demographics ==
=== Population ===
At the time of the 2006 National Census, the village's population was 1,501 in 356 households. The following census in 2011 counted 1,496 people in 441 households. The 2016 census measured the population of the village as 1,484 people in 481 households.
