= Khan Duz-e Sadat =

Village in Golestan province, Iran

Khan Duz-e Sadat Persian: خاندوزسادات
- Village
- Location within Iran
- Coordinates: 37°03′57″N 55°11′51″E
- Country: Iran
- Province: Golestan
- County: Azadshahr
- District: Central
- Rural District: Khormarud-e Shomali

Population (2016)
  - Total: 1,130
- Time zone: UTC+3:30 (IRST)

Khan Duz-e Sadat (Persian: خاندوزسادات) (Note: Also romanized as Khān Dūz-e Sādāt and Khāndūz Sādāt; also known as Khān Dūz) is a village in Khormarud-e Shomali Rural District of the Central District in Azadshahr County, Golestan province, Iran.

== Demographics ==
=== Population ===
At the time of the 2006 National Census, the village's population was 1,147 in 266 households. The following census in 2011 counted 1,238 people in 348 households. The 2016 census measured the population of the village as 1,130 people in 335 households.
