= Poli-ye Olya =

Poli-ye Olya پلي عليا
- Village
- Location within Iran
- Coordinates: 37°39′29″N 55°59′32″E
- Country: Iran
- Province: Golestan
- County: Maraveh Tappeh
- Bakhsh: Golidagh
- Rural District: Golidagh

Population (2006)
  - Total: 286
- Time zone: UTC+3:30 (IRST)
  - Summer (DST): UTC+4:30 (IRDT)

Poli-ye Olya (Persian: پلي عليا, also Romanized as Polī-ye ‘Olyā; also known as Pūlī-ye Bālā) is a village in Golidagh Rural District, Golidagh District, Maraveh Tappeh County, Golestan Province, Iran. At the 2006 census, its population was 286, in 50 families.
