= Azdar Tappeh =

Village in Golestan province, Iran

Azdar Tappeh Persian: ازدار تپه
- Village
- Location within Iran
- Coordinates: 37°05′29″N 55°11′26″E
- Country: Iran
- Province: Golestan
- County: Azadshahr
- District: Central
- Rural District: Khormarud-e Shomali

Population (2016)
  - Total: 4,687
- Time zone: UTC+3:30 (IRST)

Azdar Tappeh (Persian: ازدارتپه) (Note: Also romanized as Azdār Tappeh) is a village in, and the capital of, Khormarud-e Shomali Rural District in the Central District of Azadshahr County, Golestan province, Iran.

== Demographics ==
=== Population ===
At the time of the 2006 National Census, the village's population was 2,920 in 735 households. The following census in 2011 counted 3,296 people in 938 households. The 2016 census measured the population of the village as 4,687 people in 1,456 households. It was the most populous village in its rural district.
