= Rig Cheshmeh, Minudasht =

Rig Cheshmeh ريگ چشمه
- Village
- Location within Iran
- Coordinates: 37°07′00″N 55°28′00″E
- Country: Iran
- Province: Golestan
- County: Minudasht
- Bakhsh: Central
- Rural District: Qaleh Qafeh

Population (2016)
  - Total: 98
- Time zone: UTC+3:30 (IRST)

Rig Cheshmeh (Persian: ريگ چشمه, also Romanized as Rīg Cheshmeh) is a village in Qaleh Qafeh Rural District, in the Central District of Minudasht County, Golestan Province, Iran.

At the time of the 2006 National Census, the village's population, was 110 in 32 households. The following census in 2011 counted 89 people in 30 households. The 2016 census measured the population of the village as 98 people in 36 households.
