= Akbarabad, Azadshahr =

Village in Golestan province, Iran

Akbarabad Persian: اكبراباد
- Village
- Location within Iran
- Coordinates: 37°04′32″N 55°09′23″E
- Country: Iran
- Province: Golestan
- County: Azadshahr
- District: Central
- Rural District: Khormarud-e Shomali

Population (2016)
  - Total: 1,305
- Time zone: UTC+3:30 (IRST)

Akbarabad (Persian: اكبراباد) (Note: Also romanized as Akbarābād) is a village in Khormarud-e Shomali Rural District of the Central District in Azadshahr County, Golestan province, Iran.

== Demographics ==
=== Population ===
At the time of the 2006 National Census, the village's population was 1,039 in 240 households. The following census in 2011 counted 1,181 people in 340 households. The 2016 census measured the population of the village as 1,305 people in 368 households.
