= Fazelabad, Azadshahr =

Village in Golestan province, Iran

Fazelabad Persian: فاضل اباد
- Village
- Location within Iran
- Coordinates: 37°03′32″N 55°12′21″E
- Country: Iran
- Province: Golestan
- County: Azadshahr
- District: Central
- Rural District: Khormarud-e Shomali

Population (2016)
  - Total: 1,726
- Time zone: UTC+3:30 (IRST)

Fazelabad (Persian: فاضل اباد) (Note: Also romanized as Fāẕelābād) is a village in Khormarud-e Shomali Rural District of the Central District in Azadshahr County, Golestan province, Iran.

== Demographics ==
=== Population ===
At the time of the 2006 National Census, the village's population was 1,350 in 304 households. The following census in 2011 counted 1,647 people in 459 households. The 2016 census measured the population of the village as 1,726 people in 498 households.
