= Hoseyn Kord =

Hoseyn Kord حسين كرد
- Village
- Location within Iran
- Coordinates: 37°13′35″N 55°24′03″E
- Country: Iran
- Province: Golestan
- County: Minudasht
- Bakhsh: Central
- Rural District: Chehel Chay

Population (2016)
  - Total: 169
- Time zone: UTC+3:30 (IRST)

Hoseyn Kord (Persian: حسين كرد, also Romanized as Ḩoseyn Kord) is a village in Chehel Chay Rural District, in the Central District of Minudasht County, Golestan Province, Iran.

At the time of the 2006 National Census, the village's population was 157 in 46 households. The following census in 2011 counted 162 people in 47 households. The 2016 census measured the population of the village as 169 people in 56 households.
