= Rig Cheshmeh, Babol =

Rig Cheshmeh ريگ چشمه
- Village
- Interactive map of Rig Cheshmeh
- Coordinates: 36.309°N 52.702°E
- Country: Iran
- Province: Mazandaran
- County: Babol
- Bakhsh: Babol Kenar
- Rural District: Deraz Kola

Population (2016)
  - Total: 74
- Time zone: UTC+3:30 (IRST)

Rig Cheshmeh (Persian: ريگ چشمه, also Romanized as Rīg Cheshmeh) is a village in Deraz Kola Rural District, Babol Kenar District, Babol County, Mazandaran Province, Iran.

At the time of the 2006 National Census, the village's population was 93 in 29 households. The following census in 2011 counted 108 people in 34 households. The 2016 census measured the population of the village as 74 people in 29 households.
