= Yelkhi Surlan =

Yelkhi Surlan يلقي سورلن
- Village
- Location within Iran
- Coordinates: 37°38′15″N 55°54′30″E
- Country: Iran
- Province: Golestan
- County: Maraveh Tappeh
- Bakhsh: Golidagh
- Rural District: Golidagh

Population (2006)
  - Total: 207
- Time zone: UTC+3:30 (IRST)
  - Summer (DST): UTC+4:30 (IRDT)

Yelkhi Surlan (Persian: يلقي سورلن, also Romanized as Yelkhī Sūrlan; also known as Īlkhī Sūrkan) is a village in Golidagh Rural District, Golidagh District, Maraveh Tappeh County, Golestan Province, Iran. At the 2006 census, its population was 207, in 34 families.
