= Nili, Iran =

Village in Golestan province, Iran

Nili Persian: نيلي
- Village
- Location within Iran
- Coordinates: 37°07′08″N 55°15′37″E
- Country: Iran
- Province: Golestan
- County: Azadshahr
- District: Central
- Rural District: Khormarud-e Shomali

Population (2016)
  - Total: 1,235
- Time zone: UTC+3:30 (IRST)

Nili (Persian: نيلي) (Note: Also romanized as Nīlī) is a village in Khormarud-e Shomali Rural District of the Central District in Azadshahr County, Golestan province, Iran.

== Demographics ==
=== Population ===
At the time of the 2006 National Census, the village's population was 1,048 in 226 households. The following census in 2011 counted 1,167 people in 288 households. The 2016 census measured the population of the village as 1,235 people in 356 households.
