= Sorkhu =

Sorkhu سرخو
- Village
- Location within Iran
- Coordinates: 37°09′05″N 55°24′42″E
- Country: Iran
- Province: Golestan
- County: Minudasht
- Bakhsh: Central
- Rural District: Chehel Chay

Population (2006)
  - Total: 62
- Time zone: UTC+3:30 (IRST)
  - Summer (DST): UTC+4:30 (IRDT)

Sorkhu (Persian: سرخو, also Romanized as Sorkhū; also known as Sorkh Āb) is a village in Chehel Chay Rural District, in the Central District of Minudasht County, Golestan Province, Iran. At the 2006 census, its population was 62, in 21 families.
