= Sar-e Pol, Golestan =

Sar-e Pol سرپل
- Village
- Location within Iran
- Coordinates: 37°08′39″N 55°01′42″E
- Country: Iran
- Province: Golestan
- County: Gonbad-e Qabus
- Bakhsh: Central
- Rural District: Bagheli-ye Marama

Population (2006)
  - Total: 835
- Time zone: UTC+3:30 (IRST)
  - Summer (DST): UTC+4:30 (IRDT)

Sar-e Pol (Persian: سرپل) is a village in Bagheli-ye Marama Rural District, in the Central District of Gonbad-e Qabus County, Golestan Province, Iran. At the 2006 census, its population was 835, in 192 families.
