= Tigh Zamin =

Village in Golestan province, Iran

Tigh Zamin Persian: تيغ زمين
- Village
- Location within Iran
- Coordinates: 37°04′40″N 55°30′00″E
- Country: Iran
- Province: Golestan
- County: Minudasht
- District: Central
- Rural District: Qaleh Qafeh

Population (2016)
  - Total: 306
- Time zone: UTC+3:30 (IRST)

Tigh Zamin (Persian: تيغ زمين) (Note: Also romanized as Tīgh Zamīn; also known as Āhangar Maḩalleh and Angar Maḩalleh) is a village in Qaleh Qafeh Rural District of the Central District in Minudasht County, Golestan province, Iran.

== Demographics ==
=== Population ===
At the time of the 2006 National Census, the village's population was 347 in 84 households. The following census in 2011 counted 313 people in 83 households. The 2016 census measured the population of the village as 306 people in 89 households.
