= Korand, Golestan =

City in Golestan province, Iran

Korand Persian: كرند
- City
- Location within Iran
- Coordinates: 37°57′43″N 55°30′58″E
- Country: Iran
- Province: Golestan
- County: Gonbad-e Kavus
- District: Dashli Borun
- Established as a city: 2021

Population (2016)
  - Total: 5,616
- Time zone: UTC+3:30 (IRST)

Korand (Persian: كرند) (Note: Also romanized as Korand; also known as Kuren) is a city in Dashli Borun District of Gonbad-e Kavus County, Golestan province, Iran. As a village, it was the capital of Kerend Rural District until its capital was transferred to the village of Howtan.

== Demographics ==
=== Population ===
At the time of the 2006 National Census, Korand's population was 4,342 in 969 households, when it was village in Kerend Rural District. The following census in 2011 counted 4,922 people in 1,249 households. The 2016 census measured the population of the village as 5,616 people in 1,530 households. It was the most populous village in its rural district.

The village of Korand was converted to a city in 2021.
