= Aram Nerow-e Pain =

Aram Nerow-e Pain ارام نرو پائين
- Village
- Location within Iran
- Coordinates: 37°11′49″N 55°23′31″E
- Country: Iran
- Province: Golestan
- County: Minudasht
- Bakhsh: Central
- Rural District: Chehel Chay

Population (2016)
  - Total: 305
- Time zone: UTC+3:30 (IRST)

Aram Nerow-e Pain (Persian: ارام نرو پائين, also Romanized as Ārām Nerow-e Pā’īn; also known as Ārām Nerow) is a village in Chehel Chay Rural District, in the Central District of Minudasht County, Golestan Province, Iran.

At the time of the 2006 National Census, the village's population was 237 in 62 households. The following census in 2011 counted 282 people in 85 households. The 2016 census measured the population of the village as 305 people in 100 households.
