= Jangal Deh-e Bala =

Jangal Deh-e Bala جنگلده بالا
- Village
- Location within Iran
- Coordinates: 37°10′39″N 55°23′01″E
- Country: Iran
- Province: Golestan
- County: Minudasht
- Bakhsh: Central
- Rural District: Chehel Chay

Population (2006)
  - Total: 398
- Time zone: UTC+3:30 (IRST)
  - Summer (DST): UTC+4:30 (IRDT)

Jangal Deh-e Bala (Persian: جنگلده بالا, also Romanized as Jangal Deh-e Bālā; also known as Jangal Deh) is a village in Chehel Chay Rural District, in the Central District of Minudasht County, Golestan Province, Iran. At the 2006 census, its population was 398, in 116 families.
