= Deh Abdollah, Golestan =

Deh Abdollah ده عبداله
- Village
- Location within Iran
- Coordinates: 37°15′00″N 55°20′00″E
- Country: Iran
- Province: Golestan
- County: Minudasht
- Bakhsh: Central
- Rural District: Chehel Chay

Population (2016)
  - Total: 396
- Time zone: UTC+3:30 (IRST)

Deh Abdollah (Persian: ده عبداله, also Romanized as Deh ‘Abdollāh) is a village in Chehel Chay Rural District, in the Central District of Minudasht County, Golestan Province, Iran.

At the time of the 2006 National Census, the village's population was 340 in 84 households. The following census in 2011 counted 397 people in 111 households. The 2016 census measured the population of the village as 396 people in 117 households.
