= Aram Nerow-e Bala =

Aram Nerow-e Bala ارام نرو بالا
- Village
- Location within Iran
- Coordinates: 37°11′37″N 55°23′51″E
- Country: Iran
- Province: Golestan
- County: Minudasht
- Bakhsh: Central
- Rural District: Chehel Chay

Population (2016)
  - Total: 112
- Time zone: UTC+3:30 (IRST)

Aram Nerow-e Bala (Persian: ارام نرو بالا, also Romanized as Ārām Nerow-e Bālā; also known as Ārām Nerow) is a village in Chehel Chay Rural District, in the Central District of Minudasht County, Golestan Province, Iran.

At the time of the 2006 National Census, the village's population was 96 in 27 households. The following census in 2011 counted 88 people in 30 households. The 2016 census measured the population of the village as 112 people in 31 households.
