= Bishak Tappeh, Maraveh Tappeh =

Bishak Tappeh بيشك تپه
- Village
- Location within Iran
- Coordinates: 37°38′36″N 55°53′47″E
- Country: Iran
- Province: Golestan
- County: Maraveh Tappeh
- Bakhsh: Golidagh
- Rural District: Golidagh

Population (2006)
  - Total: 250
- Time zone: UTC+3:30 (IRST)
  - Summer (DST): UTC+4:30 (IRDT)

Bishak Tappeh (Persian: بيشك تپه, also Romanized as Bīshak Tappeh; also known as Beshīk Tapeh and Pashk Tappeh) is a village in Golidagh Rural District, Golidagh District, Maraveh Tappeh County, Golestan Province, Iran. At the 2006 census, its population was 250, in 38 families.
