= Rig Cheshmeh, Aliabad =

Rig Cheshmeh ريگ چشمه
- Village
- Location within Iran
- Coordinates: 36°48′24″N 54°50′15″E
- Country: Iran
- Province: Golestan
- County: Aliabad
- Bakhsh: Kamalan
- Rural District: Estarabad

Population (2016)
  - Total: 42
- Time zone: UTC+3:30 (IRST)

Rig Cheshmeh (Persian: ريگ چشمه, also Romanized as Rīg Cheshmeh) is a village in Estarabad Rural District, Kamalan District, Aliabad County, Golestan Province, Iran.

The 2016 census measured the population of the village as 42 people in 13 households. Increased from 17 people in 2006.
