= Pichak Mahalleh =

Village in Golestan province, Iran

Pichak Mahalleh Persian: پيچك محله
- Village
- Location within Iran
- Coordinates: 36°54′55″N 54°50′09″E
- Country: Iran
- Province: Golestan
- County: Aliabad-e Katul
- District: Central
- Rural District: Katul

Population (2016)
  - Total: 2,503
- Time zone: UTC+3:30 (IRST)

Pichak Mahalleh (Persian: پيچك محله) (Note: Also romanized as Pīchak Maḩalleh; also known as Vashmgīr and Voshmgīr) is a village in Katul Rural District of the Central District in Aliabad-e Katul County, (Note: Formerly Aliabad County) Golestan province, Iran.

== Demographics ==
=== Population ===
At the time of the 2006 National Census, the village's population was 2,304 in 554 households. The following census in 2011 counted 2,510 people in 753 households. The 2016 census measured the population of the village as 2,503 people in 804 households.
