= Kalaleh, Golestan =

City in Golestan Province, Iran

Kalaleh Persian: کلاله
- City
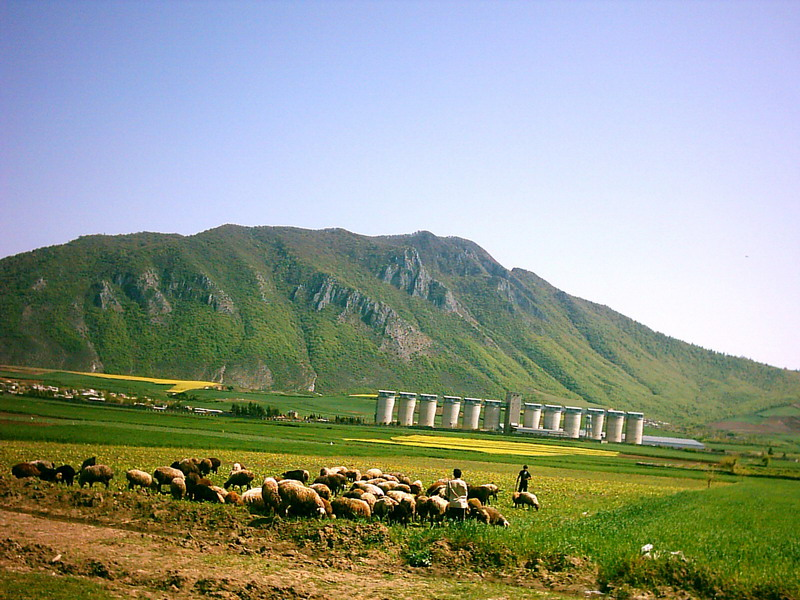

- Location within Iran
- Coordinates: 37°22′44″N 55°29′20″E
- Country: Iran
- Province: Golestan
- County: Kalaleh
- District: Central

Population (2016)
  - Total: 36,176
- Time zone: UTC+3:30 (IRST)

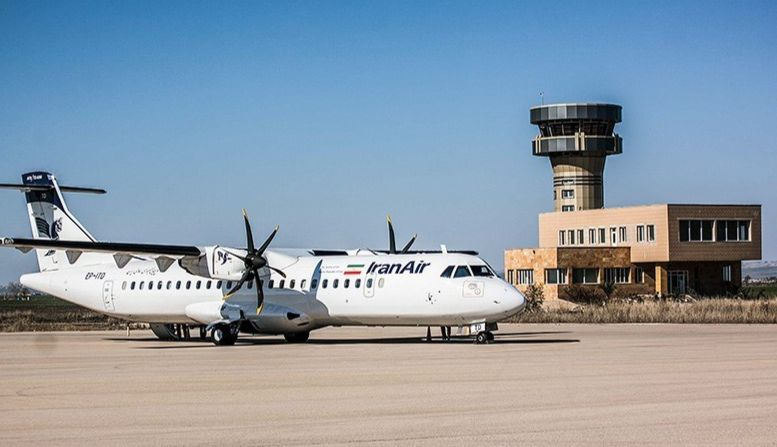
Kalaleh Airport - 2019

Kalaleh (Persian: کلاله) (Note: Also romanized as Kalālah and Kalāleh) is a city in the Central District of Kalaleh County, Golestan province, Iran, serving as capital of both the county and the district.

== Demographics ==
=== Population ===
At the time of the 2006 National Census, the city's population was 27,661 in 6,446 households. The following census in 2011 counted 27,951 people in 7,306 households. The 2016 census measured the population of the city as 36,176 people in 10,346 households.
