= Qaleh Qafeh Rural District =

Rural district in Golestan province, Iran

Qaleh Qafeh Rural District Persian: دهستان قلعه قافه
- Rural District
- Location within Iran
- Coordinates: 37°05′N 55°29′E
- Country: Iran
- Province: Golestan
- County: Minudasht
- District: Central
- Established: 1987
- Capital: Qaleh Qafeh

Population (2016)
  - Total: 4,717
- Time zone: UTC+3:30 (IRST)

Qaleh Qafeh Rural District (Persian: دهستان قلعه قافه) is in the Central District of Minudasht County, Golestan province, Iran. Its capital is the village of Qaleh Qafeh.

== Demographics ==
=== Population ===
At the time of the 2006 National Census, the rural district's population was 5,172 in 1,338 households. There were 5,028 inhabitants in 1,405 households at the following census of 2011. The 2016 census measured the population of the rural district as 4,717 in 1,426 households. The most populous of its 15 villages was Qaleh Qafeh, with 1,409 people.

=== Other villages in the rural district ===
- Balam Jerk
- Deruk
- Qaleh Qafeh-ye Pain
- Tigh Zamin
- Varcheshmeh
- Zendan Chal
