= Atrak Rural District (Gonbad-e Kavus County) =

Rural district in Golestan province, Iran

Atrak Rural District Persian: دهستان اترك
- Rural District
- Location within Iran
- Coordinates: 37°36′N 54°56′E
- Country: Iran
- Province: Golestan
- County: Gonbad-e Kavus
- District: Dashli Borun
- Established: 1987
- Capital: Dashli Borun

Population (2016)
  - Total: 15,244
- Time zone: UTC+3:30 (IRST)

Atrak Rural District (Persian: دهستان اترك) is in Dashli Borun District of Gonbad-e Kavus County, Golestan province, Iran. Its capital is the village of Dashli Borun.

== Demographics ==
=== Population ===
At the time of the 2006 National Census, the rural district's population was 12,468 in 2,527 households. There were 13,405 inhabitants in 3,189 households at the following census of 2011. The 2016 census measured the population of the rural district as 15,244 in 4,074 households. The most populous of its 30 villages was Fadavi, with 2,101 people.

=== Other villages in the rural district ===
- Aq Band
- Kheyr Khujeh-ye Olya
- Narli Dagh
- Qareh Makher
- Tangeli
- Uch Qui
