= Dashli Borun District =

District in Golestan province, Iran

Dashli Borun District Persian: بخش داشلی ‌برون
- District
- Location within Iran
- Coordinates: 37°41′N 55°07′E
- Country: Iran
- Province: Golestan
- County: Gonbad-e Kavus
- Capital: Incheh Borun

Population (2016)
  - Total: 27,181
- Time zone: UTC+3:30 (IRST)

Dashli Borun District (Persian: بخش داشلی ‌برون) is a district in Gonbad-e Kavus County, Golestan province, Iran. Its capital city is Incheh Borun.

== History ==
he village of Korand was converted to a city in 2021.

== Demographics ==
=== Population ===
As of the 2006 census, the district's population was 21,839 in 4,428 households. The following census in 2011 counted 24,197 people in 5,756 households. The 2016 census measured 27,181 inhabitants in 7,225 households.

=== Administrative divisions ===
Dashli Borun District Population
| Administrative Divisions | 2006 | 2011 | 2016 |
|---|---|---|---|
| Atrak RD | 12,468 | 13,405 | 15,244 |
| Kerend RD | 7,607 | 8,511 | 9,443 |
| Incheh Borun (city) | 1,764 | 2,281 | 2,494 |
| Korand (city) (Note: Became a city after the 2016 census) | | | |
| Total | 21,839 | 24,197 | 27,181 |
RD = Rural District
