= Gonbad-e Kavus County =

County in Golestan Province, Iran

Gonbad-e Kavus County Persian: شهرستان گنبد کاووس
- County
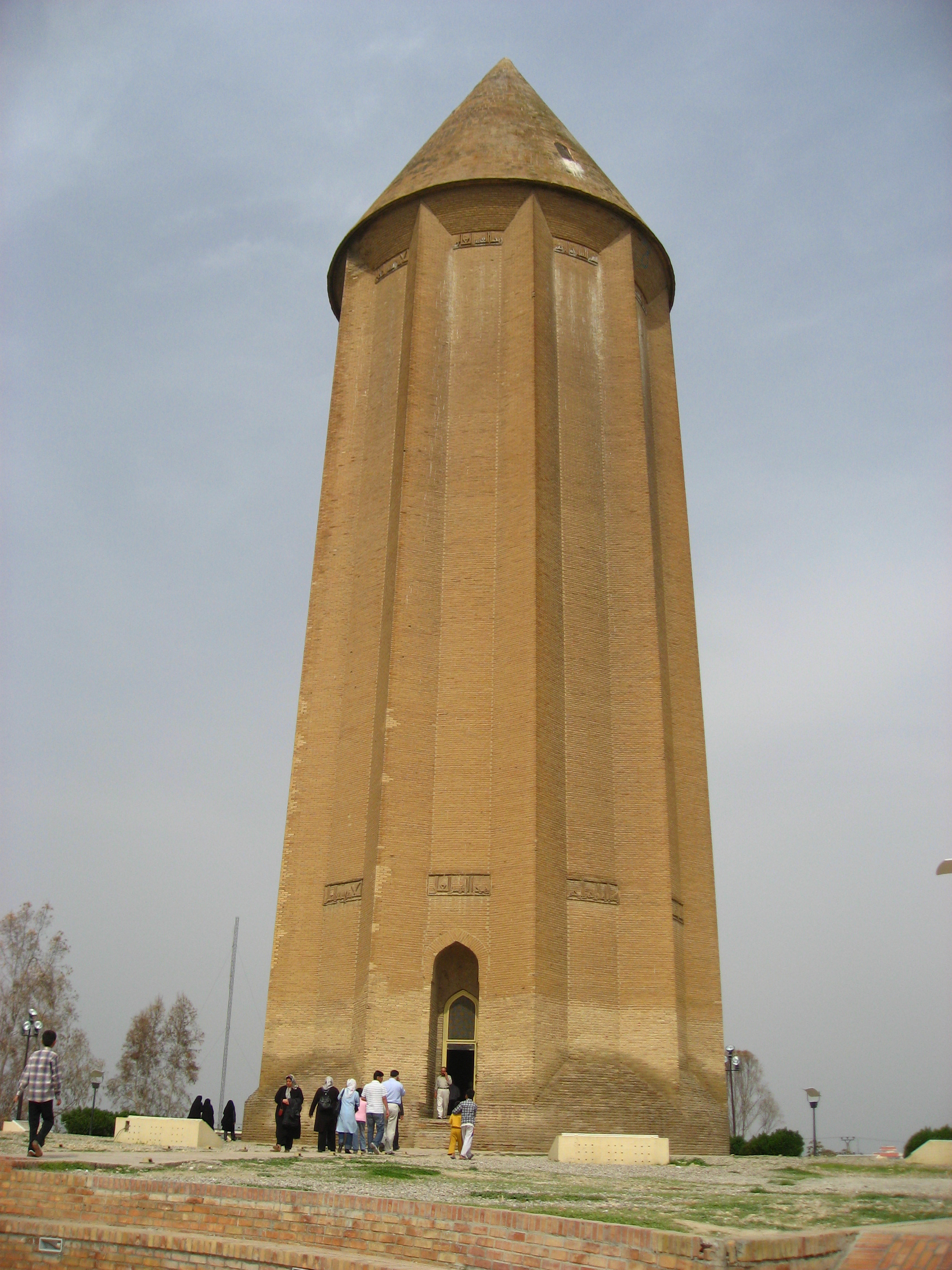
- The tower, in the capital, Gonbad-e Kavus, is a remnant of Ziyarid architecture

- Location of Gonbad-e Kavus County in Golestan province (top, yellow)

- Location of Golestan province in Iran
- Coordinates: 37°35′N 55°04′E
- Country: Iran
- Province: Golestan
- Capital: Gonbad-e Kavus
- Districts: Central, Dashli Borun

Population (2016)
  - Total: 348,744
- Time zone: UTC+3:30 (IRST)

Gonbad-e Kavus County (Persian: شهرستان گنبد کاووس) is in Golestan province, Iran. Its capital is the city of Gonbad-e Kavus.

== History ==
Formerly called Gorgan or Jorjan, because of the ruins of the historical city called Gorgan, the capital of the Ziyarid dynasty, in its southwest corner. It was called Hyrcania in ancient times. Its capital city was founded by German engineers and architects with high urban engineering standards, by the order of Reza Pahlavi.

The village of Korand was converted to a city in 2021.

== Demographics ==
=== Population ===
At the time of the 2006 census, the county's population was 283,331 in 63,482 households. The following census in 2011 counted 325,789 people in 83,369 households. The 2016 census measured the population of the county as 348,744 in 97,147 households.

=== Administrative divisions ===
Gonbad-e Kavus County's population history and administrative structure over three consecutive censuses are shown in the following table.

Gonbad-e Kavus County Population
Administrative Divisions	2006	2011	2016
Central District	261,492	300,846	320,894
Aqabad RD	29,707	32,907	36,886
Bagheli-ye Marama RD	33,148	34,077	35,771
Fajr RD	40,672	50,678	52,923
Soltanali RD	30,798	38,638	43,404
Gonbad-e Kavus (city)	127,167	144,546	151,910
Dashli Borun District	21,839	24,197	27,181
Atrak RD	12,468	13,405	15,244
Kerend RD	7,607	8,511	9,443
Incheh Borun (city)	1,764	2,281	2,494
Korand (city) (Note: Became a city after the 2016 census)			
Total	283,331	325,789	348,744
RD = Rural District

== See also ==
Media related to Gonbad-e Kavus County at Wikimedia Commons
