= Shirang =

Shirang may refer to:

- Shirang, Burma
- Shirang-e Olya, Golestan Province, Iran
- Shirang-e Sofla, Golestan Province, Iran
- Shirang Rural District, in Golestan Province, Iran
- Shirang, Kohgiluyeh and Boyer-Ahmad, Iran
