= Golestan, Golestan =

Golestan گلستان
- Neighborhood
- Location within Iran
- Coordinates: 36°54′41″N 54°44′30″E
- Country: Iran
- Province: Golestan
- County: Aliabad
- Bakhsh: Kamalan
- City: Fazelabad

Population (2006)
  - Total: 2,153
- Time zone: UTC+3:30 (IRST)

Golestan (Persian: گلستان, also Romanized as Golestān) is a neighborhood in the city of Fazelabad in Golestan Province, Iran.

Formerly it was a village in Estarabad Rural District, Kamalan District of Aliabad County. At the 2006 census, its population was 2,153, in 517 families. In 2011, its population was 2,118 people in 1,046 households.

After the census, Golestan village was annexed to Fazelabad city.
