= Cheli-ye Sofla =

Cheli-ye Sofla چلی سفلی(پایین چلی)
- Village
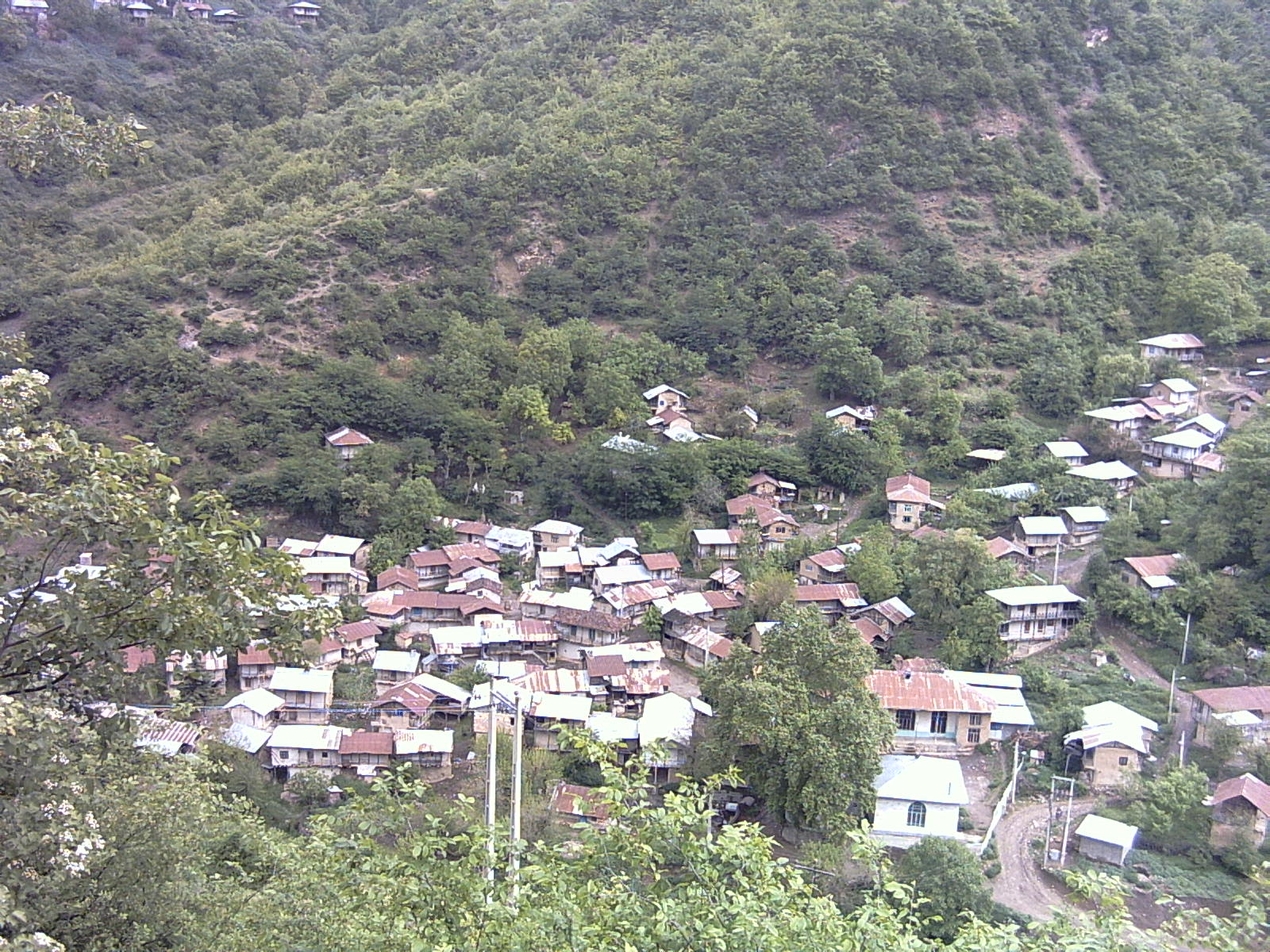
- Pain Cheli

- Location within Iran
- Coordinates: 36°47′22″N 54°50′43″E
- Country: Iran
- Province: Golestan
- County: Aliabad
- Bakhsh: Kamalan
- Rural District: Estarabad

Population (2016)
  - Total: 33
- Time zone: UTC+3:30 (IRST)

Cheli-ye Sofla (Persian: چلی سفلی, also Romanized as Çelī-ye 'Soflā; also known as Chelī-ye Pāīn and Pāīn Chelī) is a village in Estarabad Rural District, Kamalan District, Aliabad County, Golestan province, Iran.

It is a mountainous village with a cold climate, 18 km (11 mi) south of Aliabad-e Katul. At the 2016 census, its population was 33, in 9 families. People of the village are Shia Muslim, and they are active in cereal cultivation and livestock keeping.
