= Amirabad-e Fenderesk =

Amirabad-e Fenderesk اميرآباد فندرسک
- Village
- Location within Iran
- Coordinates: 37°00′00″N 54°54′45″E
- Country: Iran
- Province: Golestan
- County: Aliabad
- Bakhsh: Central
- Rural District: Katul

Population (2016)
  - Total: 233
- Time zone: UTC+3:30 (IRST)

Amirabad-e Fenderesk (Persian: اميرآباد فندرسک, also Romanized as Amīrābād-e Fenderesk) is a village in Katul Rural District, in the Central District of Aliabad County, Golestan Province, Iran. At the 2006 census, its population was 314, in 93 families. In 2016, its population was 233, in 78 households.
