= Savar Kalateh =

Savar Kalateh ساوركلاته
- Village
- Location within Iran
- Coordinates: 36°56′18″N 54°51′50″E
- Country: Iran
- Province: Golestan
- County: Aliabad
- Bakhsh: Central
- Rural District: Katul

Population (2016)
  - Total: 402
- Time zone: UTC+3:30 (IRST)

Savar Kalateh (Persian: ساوركلاته, also Romanized as Sāvar Kalāteh) is a village in Katul Rural District, in the Central District of Aliabad County, Golestan Province, Iran. At the 2016 census, its population was 402, in 125 families. Down from 450 in 2006.
