= Zabihabad, Golestan =

Village in Golestan province, Iran

Zabihabad Persian: ذبيح اباد
- Village
- Location within Iran
- Coordinates: 36°58′05″N 54°47′28″E
- Country: Iran
- Province: Golestan
- County: Aliabad-e Katul
- District: Kamalan
- Rural District: Shirang

Population (2016)
  - Total: 54
- Time zone: UTC+3:30 (IRST)

Zabihabad (Persian: ذبيح اباد) (Note: Also romanized as Z̄abīḩābād) is a village in Shirang Rural District of Kamalan District in Aliabad-e Katul County, (Note: Formerly Aliabad County) Golestan province, Iran.

== Demographics ==
=== Population ===
At the time of the 2006 National Census, the village's population was 163 in 39 households. The following census in 2011 counted 128 people in 29 households. The 2016 census measured the population of the village as 54 people in 16 households.
