= Cheli-ye Olya =

Cheli-ye Olya چلی عليا (بالا چلی)
- Village
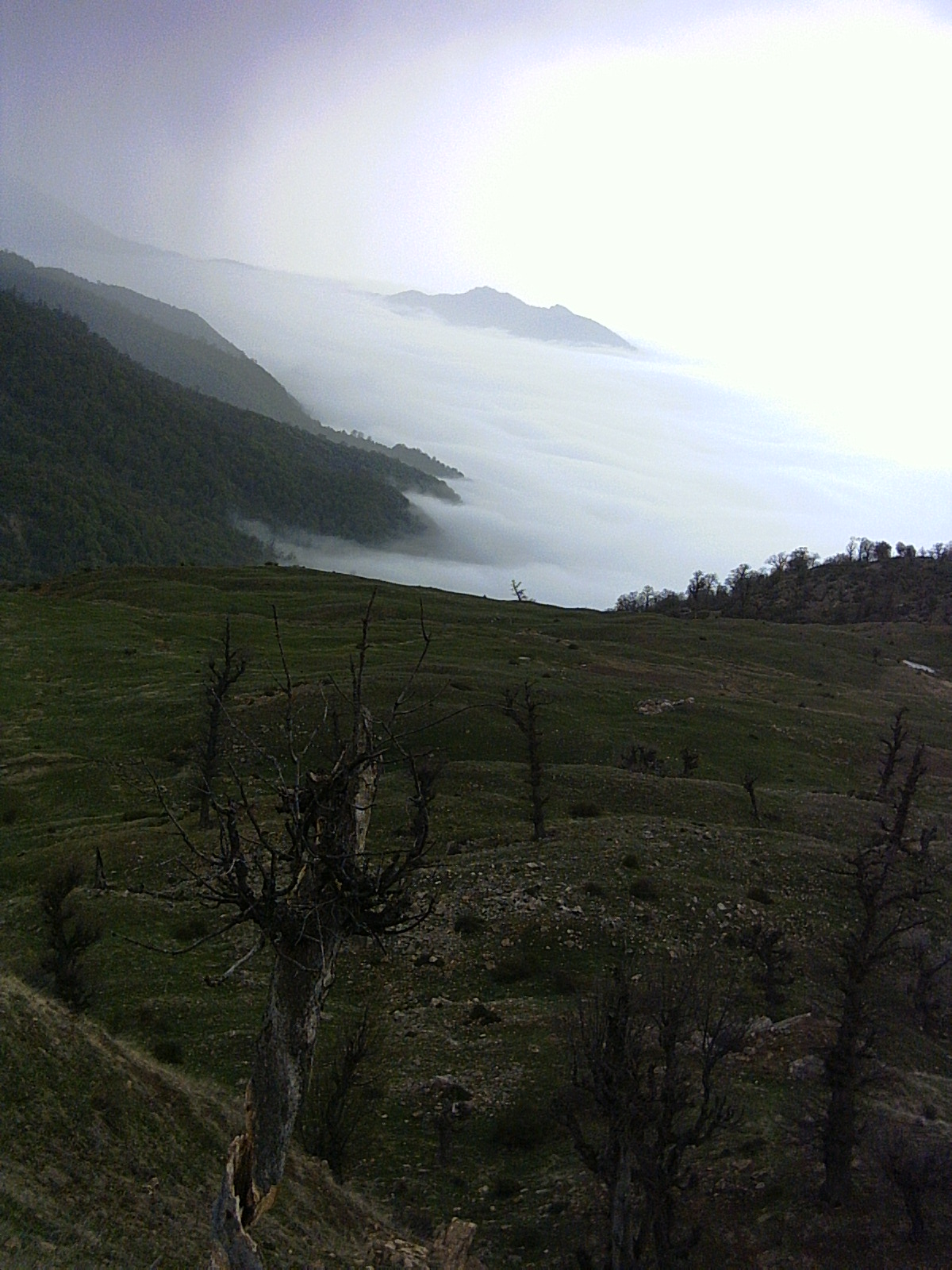
- Nature near Bala Cheli

- Location within Iran
- Coordinates: 36°47′06″N 54°51′35″E
- Country: Iran
- Province: Golestan
- County: Aliabad
- Bakhsh: Kamalan
- Rural District: Estarabad

Population (2016)
  - Total: 60
- Time zone: UTC+3:30 (IRST)

Cheli-ye Olya (Persian: چلی عليا, also Romanized as Chelī-ye 'Olyā; also known as Chelī-ye Bālā) is a village in Estarabad Rural District, Kamalan District, Aliabad County, Golestan province, Iran. At the 2016 census, its population was 60, in 21 families. Increased from 29 people in 2006.
