= Ahmadabad, Aliabad-e Katul =

Village in Golestan province, Iran

Ahmadabad Persian: احمدآباد
- Village
- Location within Iran
- Coordinates: 37°03′42″N 54°53′43″E
- Country: Iran
- Province: Golestan
- County: Aliabad-e Katul
- District: Kamalan
- Rural District: Shirang

Population (2016)
  - Total: 796
- Time zone: UTC+3:30 (IRST)

Ahmadabad (Persian: احمدآباد) (Note: Also romanized as Aḩmadābād; also known as Balūchābād (بلوچ آباد) and Sāzemān-e Balūchābād) is a village in Shirang Rural District of Kamalan District in Aliabad-e Katul County, (Note: Formerly Aliabad County) Golestan province, Iran.

== Demographics ==
=== Population ===
At the time of the 2006 National Census, the village's population was 614 in 125 households. The following census in 2011 counted 336 people in 153 households. The 2016 census measured the population of the village as 796 people in 200 households.
