= Bahalkeh-ye Nafas =

Bahalkeh-ye Nafas بهلكه نفس
- Village
- Location within Iran
- Coordinates: 37°01′06″N 54°49′11″E
- Country: Iran
- Province: Golestan
- County: Aliabad
- Bakhsh: Central
- Rural District: Katul

Population (2016)
  - Total: 698
- Time zone: UTC+3:30 (IRST)

Bahalkeh-ye Nafas (Persian: بهلكه نفس, also known as Mahlakeh Nafas) is a village in Katul Rural District, in the Central District of Aliabad County, Golestan Province, Iran. In 2016 census, its population was 698, in 196 households. Increased from 301 people in 2006.
