= Khak-e Pir-e Zan =

Village in Golestan province, Iran

Khak-e Pir-e Zan Persian: خاكپيرزن
- Village
- Location within Iran
- Coordinates: 36°51′37″N 55°01′38″E
- Country: Iran
- Province: Golestan
- County: Aliabad-e Katul
- District: Central
- Rural District: Zarrin Gol

Population (2016)
  - Total: 180
- Time zone: UTC+3:30 (IRST)

Khak-e Pir-e Zan (Persian: خاكپيرزن) (Note: Also romanized as Khāk-e Pīr-e Zan) is a village in Zarrin Gol Rural District of the Central District in Aliabad-e Katul County, (Note: Formerly Aliabad County) Golestan province, Iran.

== Demographics ==
=== Population ===
At the time of the 2006 National Census, the village's population was 176 in 41 households. The following census in 2011 counted 208 people in 56 households. The 2016 census measured the population of the village as 180 people in 55 households.
