= Emamabad-e Sistaniha =

Emamabad-e Sistaniha امام آباد سيستانيها
- Village
- Location within Iran
- Coordinates: 36°58′59″N 54°48′40″E
- Country: Iran
- Province: Golestan
- County: Aliabad
- Bakhsh: Central
- Rural District: Katul

Population (2016)
  - Total: 303
- Time zone: UTC+3:30 (IRST)

Emamabad-e Sistaniha (Persian: امام آباد سيستانيها, also Romanized as Emāmābād-e Sīstānīhā; also known as Emāmābād and Āvānsīyeh) is a village in Katul Rural District, in the Central District of Aliabad County, Golestan Province, Iran. At the 2006 census, its population was 276, in 64 families. In 2016, its population was 303, in 91 households.
