= Shirinabad, Golestan =

Village in Golestan province, Iran

Shirinabad Persian: شیرین آباد
- Village
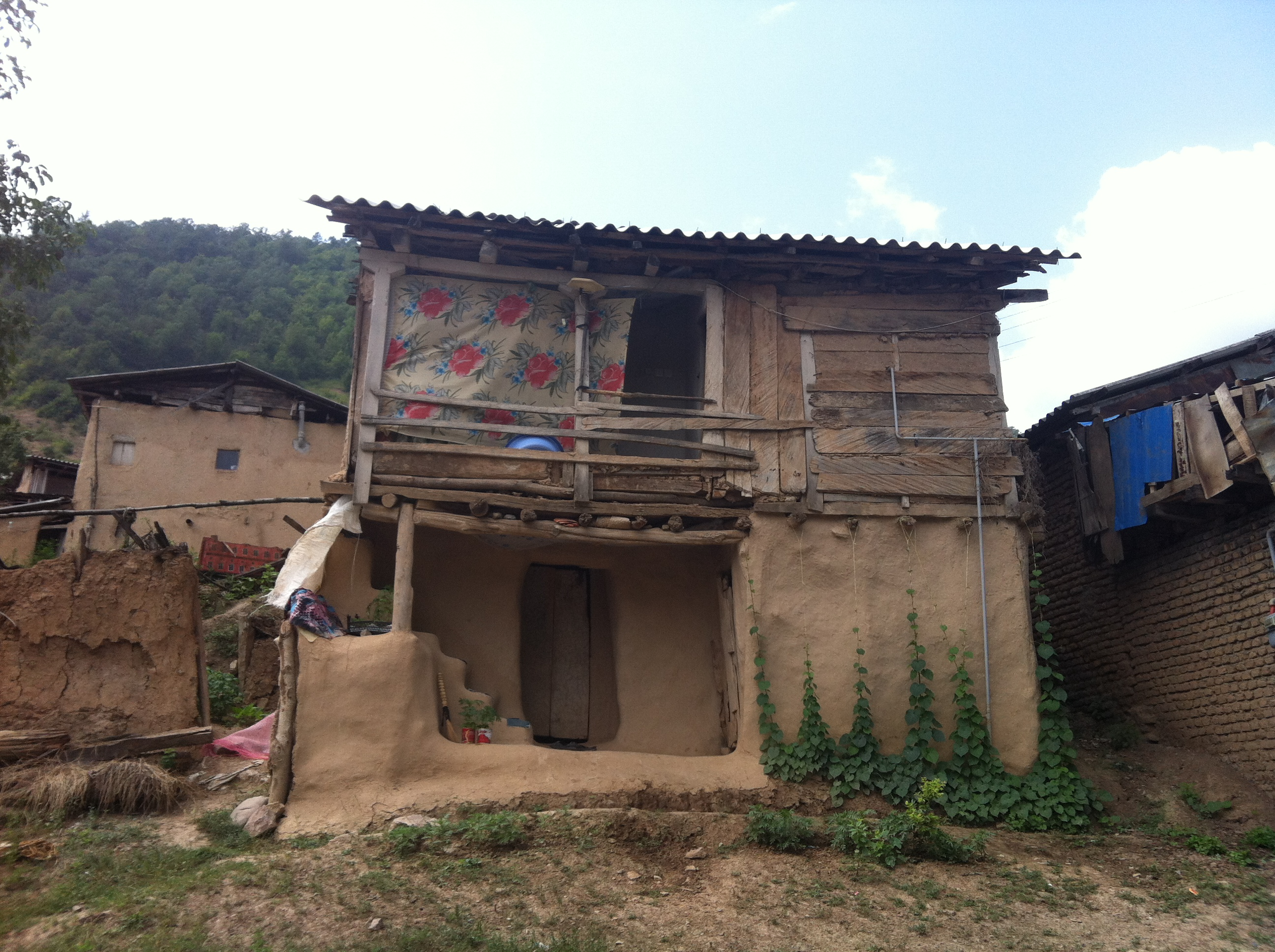
- House in the village of Shirinabad

- Location within Iran
- Coordinates: 36°47′33″N 55°00′56″E
- Country: Iran
- Province: Golestan
- County: Aliabad-e Katul
- District: Central
- Rural District: Zarrin Gol

Population (2016)
  - Total: 443
- Time zone: UTC+3:30 (IRST)

Shirinabad (Persian: شیرین آباد) (Note: Also romanized as Shīrīnābād) is a village in Zarrin Gol Rural District of the Central District in Aliabad-e Katul County, (Note: Formerly Aliabad County) Golestan province, Iran.

== Demographics ==
=== Population ===
At the time of the 2006 National Census, the village's population was 453 in 134 households. The following census in 2011 counted 453 people in 147 households. The 2016 census measured the population of the village as 443 people in 162 households.
