= Hakimabad, Golestan =

Village in Golestan province, Iran

Hakimabad Persian: حكيم اباد
- Village
- Location within Iran
- Coordinates: 36°57′56″N 54°54′56″E
- Country: Iran
- Province: Golestan
- County: Aliabad-e Katul
- District: Central
- Rural District: Katul

Population (2016)
  - Total: 1,901
- Time zone: UTC+3:30 (IRST)

Hakimabad (Persian: حكيم اباد) (Note: Also romanized as Ḩakīmābād) is a village in Katul Rural District of the Central District in Aliabad-e Katul County, (Note: Formerly Aliabad County) Golestan province, Iran.

== Demographics ==
=== Population ===
At the time of the 2006 National Census, the village's population was 2,018 in 470 households. The following census in 2011 counted 2,074 people in 616 households. The 2016 census measured the population of the village as 1,901 people in 571 households.
