= Zaboli Mahalleh-ye Mahastan =

Zaboli Mahalleh-ye Mahastan زابلی محله ماهستان
- Village
- Interactive map of Zaboli Mahalleh-ye Mahastan
- Coordinates: 36°59′45.2″N 54°55′57.9″E
- Country: Iran
- Province: Golestan
- County: Aliabad
- Bakhsh: Central
- Rural District: Katul

Population (2016)
  - Total: 559
- Time zone: UTC+3:30 (IRST)

Zaboli Mahalleh-ye Mahastan (Persian: زابلی محله ماهستان, also Romanized as Zābolī Maḩalleh-ye Māhastān) is a village in Katul Rural District, in the Central District of Aliabad County, Golestan Province, Iran. At the 2016 census, its population was 559, in 154 families. Up from 522 in 2006.
