= Hajji Kalateh =

Village in Golestan province, Iran

Hajji Kalateh Persian: حاجي كلاته
- Village
- Location within Iran
- Coordinates: 37°00′00″N 54°53′31″E
- Country: Iran
- Province: Golestan
- County: Aliabad-e Katul
- District: Central
- Rural District: Katul

Population (2016)
  - Total: 1,473
- Time zone: UTC+3:30 (IRST)

Hajji Kalateh (Persian: حاجي كلاته) (Note: Also romanized as Ḩājjī Kalāteh) is a village in Katul Rural District of the Central District in Aliabad-e Katul County, (Note: Formerly Aliabad County) Golestan province, Iran.

== Demographics ==
=== Population ===
At the time of the 2006 National Census, the village's population was 1,759 in 429 households. The following census in 2011 counted 1,648 people in 477 households. The 2016 census measured the population of the village as 1,473 people in 471 households.
