= Afratakhteh =

Village in Golestan province, Iran

Afratakhteh Persian: افراتخته
- Village
- Location within Iran
- Coordinates: 36°47′30″N 54°58′08″E
- Country: Iran
- Province: Golestan
- County: Aliabad-e Katul
- District: Central
- Rural District: Zarrin Gol

Population (2016)
  - Total: 224
- Time zone: UTC+3:30 (IRST)

Afratakhteh (Persian: افراتخته) (Note: Also romanized as Afrātakhteh) is a village in Zarrin Gol Rural District of the Central District in Aliabad-e Katul County, (Note: Formerly Aliabad County) Golestan province, Iran.

== Demographics ==
=== Population ===
At the time of the 2006 National Census, the village's population was 251 in 66 households. The following census in 2011 counted 188 people in 66 households. The 2016 census measured the population of the village as 224 people in 67 households.
