= Baluchabad, Aliabad =

Baluchabad بلوچ اباد
- Village
- Location within Iran
- Coordinates: 36°58′13″N 54°42′55″E
- Country: Iran
- Province: Golestan
- County: Aliabad
- Bakhsh: Central
- Rural District: Katul

Population (2016)
  - Total: 670
- Time zone: UTC+3:30 (IRST)

Baluchabad (Persian: بلوچ اباد, also Romanized as Balūchābād) is a village in Katul Rural District, in the Central District of Aliabad County, Golestan Province, Iran. In 2016 census, its population was 670, in 193 households.Up from 585 people in 2006.
