= Boluk-e Gholam =

Boluk-e Gholam بلوك غلام
- village
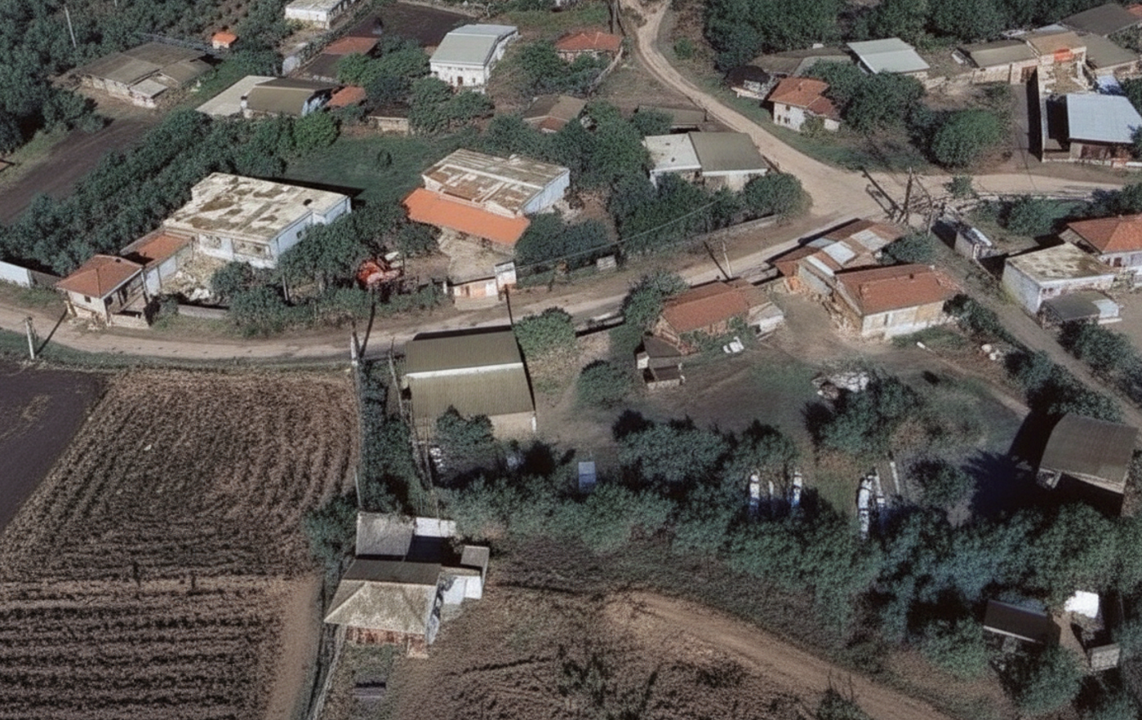

- Location within Iran
- Coordinates: 36°57′16″N 54°49′03″E
- Country: Iran
- Province: Golestan
- County: Aliabad
- Bakhsh: Central
- Rural District: Katul

Population (2016)
  - Total: 242
- Time zone: UTC+3:30 (IRST)

Boluk-e Gholam (Persian: بلوك غلام, also Romanized as Bolūk-e Gholām) is a village in Katul Rural District, in the Central District of Aliabad County, Golestan Province, Iran. At the 2006 census, its population was 249, in 63 families. In 2016, its population was 242, in 75 households.
