= Arfanabad =

Village in Golestan province, Iran

Arfanabad Persian: عرفان اباد
- Village
- Location within Iran
- Coordinates: 37°02′12″N 54°50′19″E
- Country: Iran
- Province: Golestan
- County: Aliabad-e Katul
- District: Central
- Rural District: Katul

Population (2016)
  - Total: 1,163
- Time zone: UTC+3:30 (IRST)

Arfanabad (Persian: عرفان اباد) (Note: Also romanized as ʿArfānābād) is a village in Katul Rural District of the Central District in Aliabad-e Katul County, (Note: Formerly Aliabad County) Golestan province, Iran.

== Demographics ==
=== Population ===
At the time of the 2006 National Census, the village's population was 904 in 185 households. The following census in 2011 counted 1,154 people in 292 households. The 2016 census measured the population of the village as 1,163 people in 323 households.
