= Bagheh-ye Shur Tappeh Nafas =

Bagheh-ye Shur Tappeh Nafas باغه شورتپه نفس
- Village
- Location within Iran
- Coordinates: 37°00′48″N 54°48′40″E
- Country: Iran
- Province: Golestan
- County: Aliabad
- Bakhsh: Central
- Rural District: Katul

Population (2016)
  - Total: 409
- Time zone: UTC+3:30 (IRST)

Bagheh-ye Shur Tappeh Nafas (Persian: باغه شورتپه نفس, also Romanized as Bāgh-e Shūr Tappeh Nafas; also known as Bāgh-e Shūr Tappeh) is a village in Katul Rural District, in the Central District of Aliabad County, Golestan Province, Iran. At the 2016 census, its population was 409, in 117 families. Down from 597 people in 2006.
