= Baqerabad, Aliabad-e Katul =

Village in Golestan province, Iran

Baqerabad Persian: باقراباد
- Village
- Location within Iran
- Coordinates: 36°57′45″N 54°45′21″E
- Country: Iran
- Province: Golestan
- County: Aliabad-e Katul
- District: Kamalan
- Rural District: Shirang

Population (2016)
  - Total: 823
- Time zone: UTC+3:30 (IRST)

Baqerabad (Persian: باقراباد) (Note: Also romanized as Bāqerābād) is a village in Shirang Rural District of Kamalan District in Aliabad-e Katul County, (Note: Formerly Aliabad County) Golestan province, Iran.

== Demographics ==
=== Population ===
At the time of the 2006 National Census, the village's population was 808 in 187 households. The following census in 2011 counted 814 people in 228 households. The 2016 census measured the population of the village as 823 people in 239 households.
