= Mohammadabad, Aliabad-e Katul =

Village in Golestan province, Iran

Mohammadabad Persian: محمّدآباد
- Village
- Location within Iran
- Coordinates: 36°52′09″N 54°46′36″E
- Country: Iran
- Province: Golestan
- County: Aliabad-e Katul
- District: Kamalan
- Rural District: Estarabad

Population (2016)
  - Total: 1,683
- Time zone: UTC+3:30 (IRST)

Mohammadabad (Persian: محمّدآباد) (Note: Also romanized as Moḩammadābād; also known as Mohammadabad-e Katul (محمّد آباد کتول), also romanized as Moḩammadābād-e Katūl, and Muhammadābād) is a village in Estarabad Rural District of Kamalan District in Aliabad-e Katul County, (Note: Formerly Aliabad County) Golestan province, Iran.

== Demographics ==
=== Population ===
At the time of the 2006 National Census, the village's population was 1,841 in 453 households. The following census in 2011 counted 1,826 people in 522 households. The 2016 census measured the population of the village as 1,683 people in 544 households.
