= Hoseynabad, Aliabad =

Hoseynabad حسين آباد
- Village
- Location within Iran
- Coordinates: 36°55′51″N 54°51′41″E
- Country: Iran
- Province: Golestan
- County: Aliabad
- Bakhsh: Central
- Rural District: Katul

Population (2016)
  - Total: 307
- Time zone: UTC+3:30 (IRST)

Hoseynabad (Persian: حسين آباد, also Romanized as Ḩoseynābād; also known as Ḩoseynābād-e Kalāteh) is a village in Katul Rural District, in the Central District of Aliabad County, Golestan Province, Iran. At the 2016 census, its population was 307, in 85 families. Down from 400 people in 2006.
