= Nersu =

Nersu نرسو
- Village
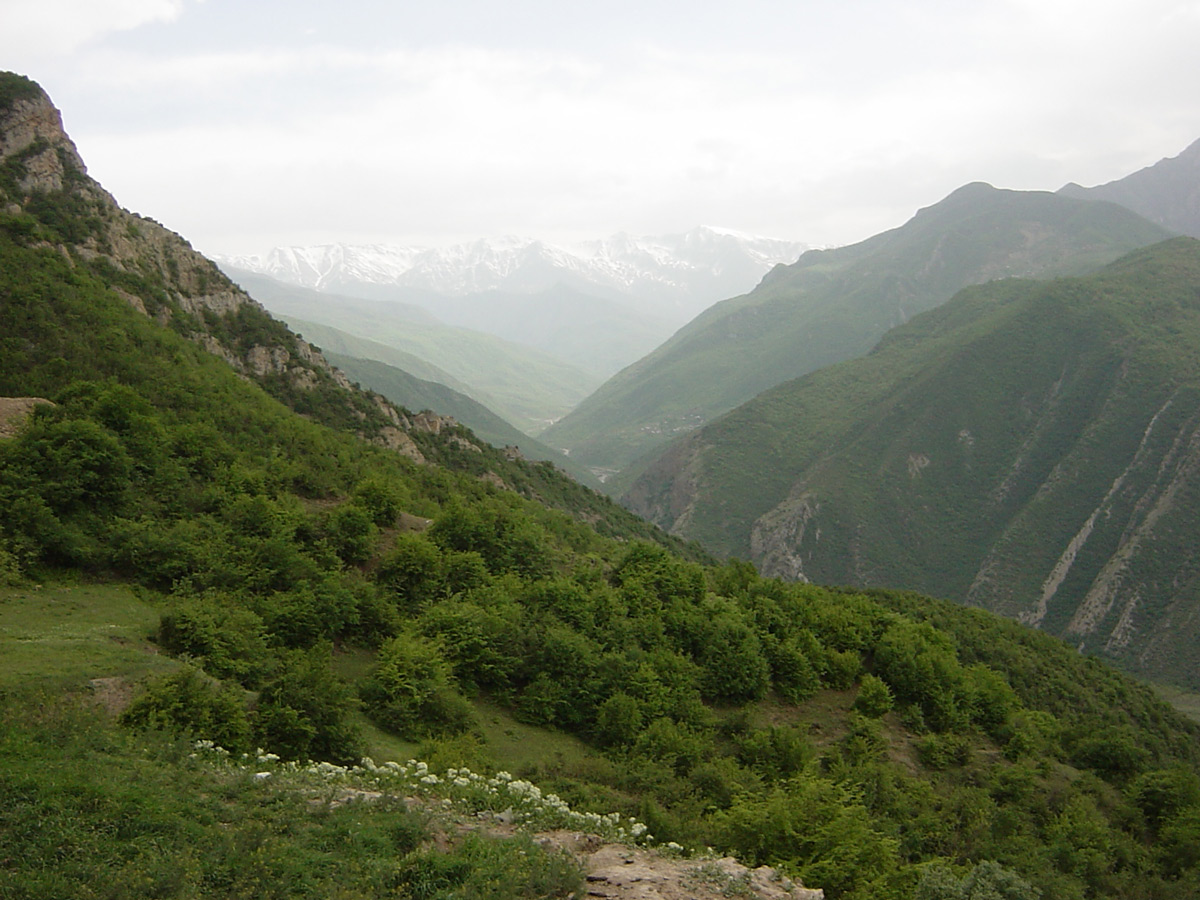
- Shahvar peak from Nersu

- Location within Iran
- Coordinates: 36°45′52″N 54°49′36″E
- Country: Iran
- Province: Golestan
- County: Aliabad
- Bakhsh: Kamalan
- Rural District: Estarabad

Population (2016)
  - Total: 41
- Time zone: UTC+3:30 (IRST)

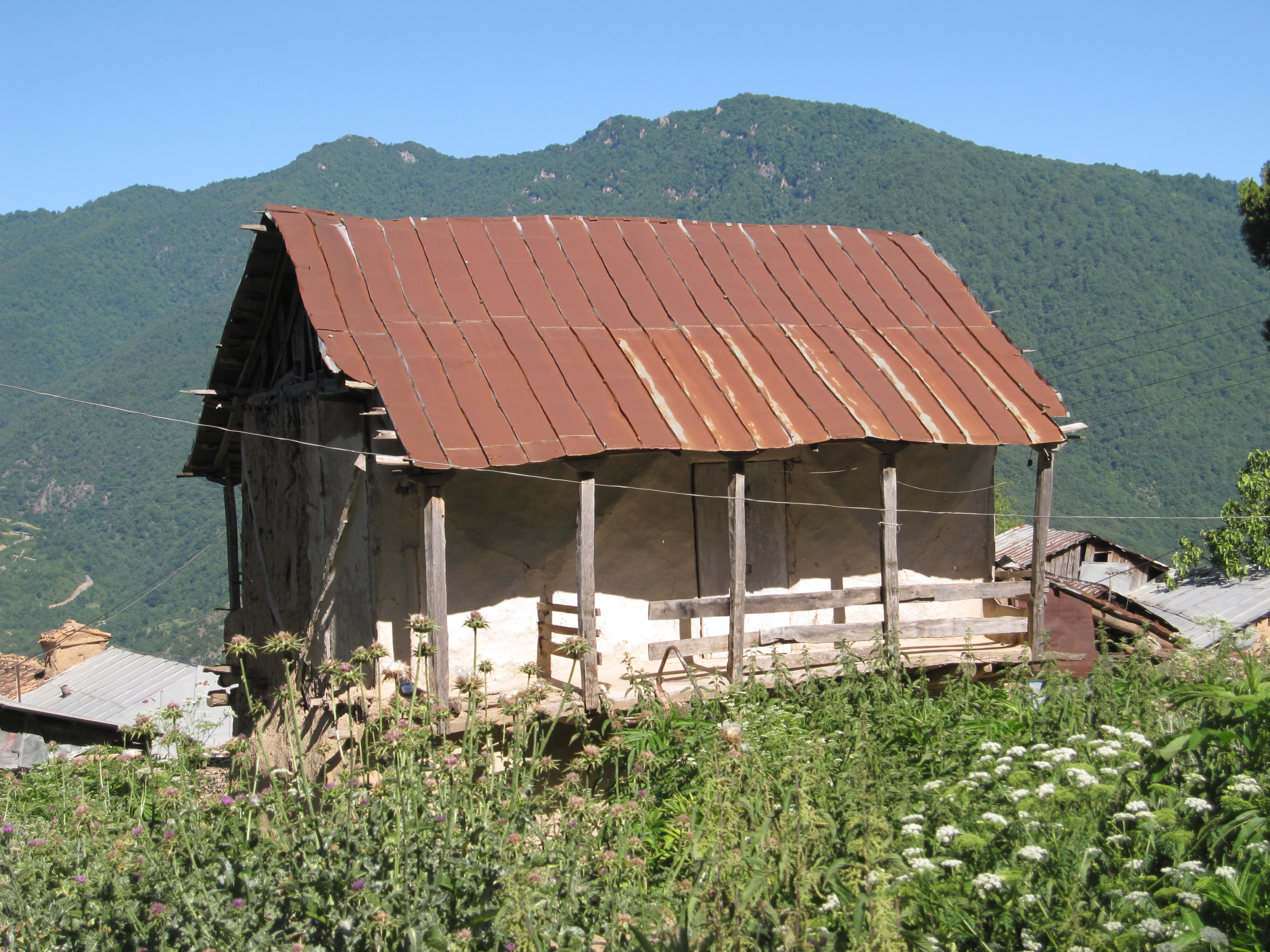
Old house in Nersu

Nersu (Persian: نرسو, also Romanized as Nersū) is a village in Estarabad Rural District, Kamalan District, Aliabad County, Golestan Province, Iran. At the 2016 census, its population was 41, in 13 families, up from 24 people in 2006.
