= Mian Rostaq =

Village in Golestan province, Iran

Mian Rostaq Persian: ميان رستاق
- Village
- Location within Iran
- Coordinates: 36°49′50″N 55°02′13″E
- Country: Iran
- Province: Golestan
- County: Aliabad-e Katul
- District: Central
- Rural District: Zarrin Gol

Population (2016)
  - Total: 144
- Time zone: UTC+3:30 (IRST)

Mian Rostaq (Persian: ميان رستاق) (Note: Also romanized as Meyān Restāq, Mīān Rostāq, and Mīyān Rostāq) is a village in Zarrin Gol Rural District of the Central District in Aliabad-e Katul County, (Note: Formerly Aliabad County) Golestan province, Iran.

== Demographics ==
=== Population ===
At the time of the 2006 National Census, the village's population was 162 in 39 households. The following census in 2011 counted 206 people in 65 households. The 2016 census measured the population of the village as 144 people in 48 households.
