= Masumabad-e Fenderesk =

Masumabad-e Fenderesk معصوم آباد فندرسک
- Village
- Location within Iran
- Coordinates: 36°59′10″N 54°55′04″E
- Country: Iran
- Province: Golestan
- County: Aliabad
- Bakhsh: Central
- Rural District: Katul

Population (2016)
  - Total: 748
- Time zone: UTC+3:30 (IRST)

Masumabad-e Fenderesk (Persian: معصوم آباد فندرسک, also Romanized as Ma‘şūmābād-e Fenderesk; also known as Ma‘şūmābād) is a village in Katul Rural District, in the Central District of Aliabad County, Golestan Province, Iran. At the 2006 census, its population was 850, in 203 families. In 2016 its population was 748, in 236 households.
