= Amirabad-e Sorkh Mahalleh =

Village in Golestan province, Iran

Amirabad-e Sorkh Mahalleh Persian: اميرابادسرخ محله
- Village
- Location within Iran
- Coordinates: 36°56′22″N 54°54′08″E
- Country: Iran
- Province: Golestan
- County: Aliabad-e Katul
- District: Central
- Rural District: Zarrin Gol

Population (2016)
  - Total: 2,843
- Time zone: UTC+3:30 (IRST)

Amirabad-e Sorkh Mahalleh (Persian: اميرابادسرخ محله) (Note: Also romanized as Amīrābād-e Sorkh Maḩalleh; also known as Sorkh Maḩalleh) is a village in Zarrin Gol Rural District of the Central District in Aliabad-e Katul County, (Note: Formerly Aliabad County) Golestan province, Iran.

== Demographics ==
=== Population ===
At the time of the 2006 National Census, the village's population was 2,340 in 482 households. The following census in 2011 counted 2,111 people in 539 households. The 2016 census measured the population of the village as 2,843 people in 693 households.
