= Abbasabad, Aliabad-e Katul =

Village in Golestan province, Iran

Abbasabad Persian: عباس آباد
- Village
- Location within Iran
- Coordinates: 36°53′05″N 54°47′23″E
- Country: Iran
- Province: Golestan
- County: Aliabad-e Katul
- District: Kamalan
- Rural District: Estarabad

Population (2016)
  - Total: 620
- Time zone: UTC+3:30 (IRST)

Abbasabad (Persian: عباس آباد) (Note: Also romanized as ‘Abbāsābād; also known as ‘Abbāsābād-e Katūl) is a village in Estarabad Rural District of Kamalan District in Aliabad-e Katul County, (Note: Formerly Aliabad County) Golestan province, Iran.

== Demographics ==
=== Population ===
At the time of the 2006 National Census, the village's population was 703 in 171 households. The following census in 2011 counted 705 people in 210 households. The 2016 census measured the population of the village as 620 people in 199 households.
