= Kuzeh Li =

Village in Golestan province, Iran

Kuzeh Li Persian: كوزه لي
- Village
- Location within Iran
- Coordinates: 36°59′45″N 54°42′44″E
- Country: Iran
- Province: Golestan
- County: Aliabad-e Katul
- District: Kamalan
- Rural District: Shirang

Population (2016)
  - Total: 451
- Time zone: UTC+3:30 (IRST)

Kuzeh Li (Persian: كوزه لي) (Note: Also romanized as Kūzeh Lī; also known as Kūzalī, Kuzeh Ali, and Kūzeh ‘Alī) is a village in Shirang Rural District of Kamalan District in Aliabad-e Katul County, (Note: Formerly Aliabad County) Golestan province, Iran.

== Demographics ==
=== Population ===
At the time of the 2006 National Census, the village's population was 386 in 80 households. The following census in 2011 counted 417 people in 108 households. The 2016 census measured the population of the village as 451 people in 121 households.
