= Shojaabad, Golestan =

Village in Golestan province, Iran

Shojaabad Persian: شجاع اباد
- Village
- Location within Iran
- Coordinates: 36°56′56″N 54°43′55″E
- Country: Iran
- Province: Golestan
- County: Aliabad-e Katul
- District: Kamalan
- Rural District: Shirang

Population (2016)
  - Total: 426
- Time zone: UTC+3:30 (IRST)

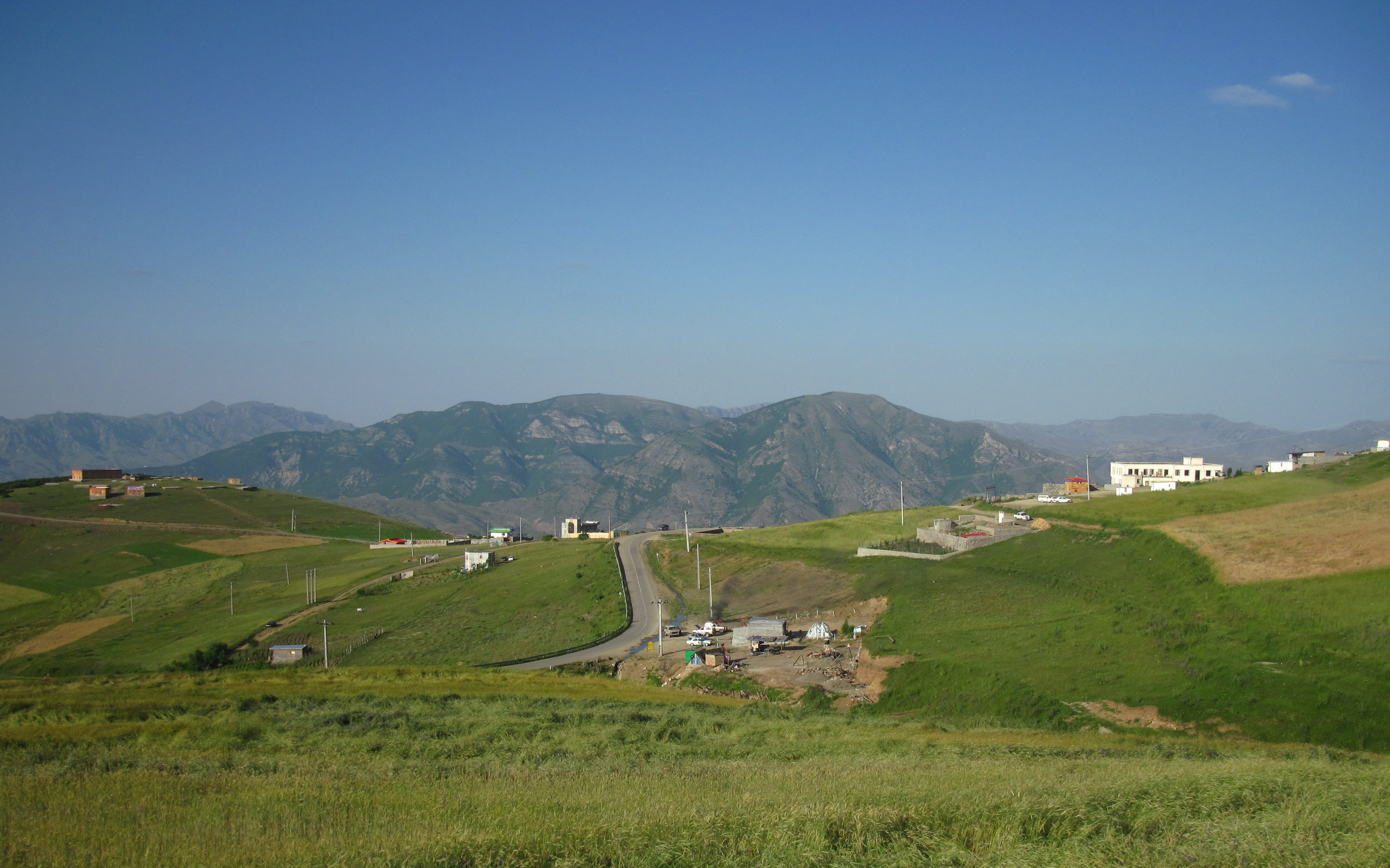
Shojaabad, 2013

Shojaabad (Persian: شجاع اباد) (Note: Also romanized as Shojā‘ābād) is a village in Shirang Rural District of Kamalan District in Aliabad-e Katul County, (Note: Formerly Aliabad County) Golestan province, Iran.

== Demographics ==
=== Population ===
At the time of the 2006 National Census, the village's population was 374 in 80 households. The following census in 2011 counted 361 people in 86 households. The 2016 census measured the population of the village as 426 people in 124 households.
