= Qushkorpi =

Qushkorpi قوش كرپی
- Village
- Location within Iran
- Coordinates: 36°58′50″N 54°50′25″E
- Country: Iran
- Province: Golestan
- County: Aliabad
- Bakhsh: Central
- Rural District: Katul

Population (2016)
  - Total: 582
- Time zone: UTC+3:30 (IRST)

Qushkorpi (Persian: قوش كرپی, also Romanized as Qūshkorpī; also known as Qūshkū’ī) is a village in Katul Rural District, in the Central District of Aliabad County, Golestan Province, Iran. At the 2016 census, its population was 582, in 175 families.
