= Hasan Tabib =

Village in Golestan province, Iran

Hasan Tabib Persian: حسن طبيب
- Village
- Location within Iran
- Coordinates: 37°00′59″N 54°47′13″E
- Country: Iran
- Province: Golestan
- County: Aliabad-e Katul
- District: Central
- Rural District: Katul

Population (2016)
  - Total: 1,510
- Time zone: UTC+3:30 (IRST)

Hasan Tabib (Persian: حسن طبيب) (Note: Also romanized as Ḩasan Ţabīb; also known as Ḩasan Ţeyyeb) is a village in Katul Rural District of the Central District in Aliabad-e Katul County, (Note: Formerly Aliabad County) Golestan province, Iran.

== Demographics ==
=== Population ===
At the time of the 2006 National Census, the village's population was 1,182 in 222 households. The following census in 2011 counted 1,235 people in 320 households. The 2016 census measured the population of the village as 1,510 people in 419 households.
