= Khatamabad =

Khatamabad (Persian: خاتم اباد) may refer to:

- Khatamabad, Golestan
- Khatamabad, Kermanshah
- Khatamabad, Markazi
