= Rahmatabad, Golestan =

Village in Golestan province, Iran

Rahmatabad Persian: رحمت اباد
- Village
- Location within Iran
- Coordinates: 36°53′17″N 54°45′51″E
- Country: Iran
- Province: Golestan
- County: Aliabad-e Katul
- District: Kamalan
- Rural District: Estarabad

Population (2016)
  - Total: 4,324
- Time zone: UTC+3:30 (IRST)

Rahmatabad (Persian: رحمت اباد) (Note: Also romanized as Raḩmatābād; also known as Raḩmatābād-e Katūl) is a village in Estarabad Rural District of Kamalan District in Aliabad-e Katul County, (Note: Formerly Aliabad County) Golestan province, Iran.

== Demographics ==
=== Population ===
At the time of the 2006 National Census, the village's population was 2,493 in 667 households. The following census in 2011 counted 3,035 people in 921 households. The 2016 census measured the population of the village as 4,324 people in 1,295 households. It was the most populous village in its rural district.
