= Alazman =

Village in Golestan province, Iran

Alazman Persian: الازمن
- Village
- Location within Iran
- Coordinates: 36°52′46″N 54°49′40″E
- Country: Iran
- Province: Golestan
- County: Aliabad-e Katul
- District: Central
- Rural District: Zarrin Gol

Population (2016)
  - Total: 704
- Time zone: UTC+3:30 (IRST)

Alazman (Persian: الازمن) (Note: Also romanized as Alāzman) is a village in Zarrin Gol Rural District of the Central District in Aliabad-e Katul County, (Note: Formerly Aliabad County) Golestan province, Iran.

== Demographics ==
=== Population ===
At the time of the 2006 National Census, the village's population was 728 in 180 households. The following census in 2011 counted 932 people in 285 households. The 2016 census measured the population of the village as 704 people in 217 households.
