= Azadtappeh =

Village in Golestan province, Iran

Azadtappeh Persian: ازادتپه
- Village
- Location within Iran
- Coordinates: 36°59′41″N 54°42′15″E
- Country: Iran
- Province: Golestan
- County: Aliabad-e Katul
- District: Kamalan
- Rural District: Shirang

Population (2016)
  - Total: 2,048
- Time zone: UTC+3:30 (IRST)

Azadtappeh (Persian: ازادتپه) (Note: Also romanized as Āzādtappeh) is a village in Shirang Rural District of Kamalan District in Aliabad-e Katul County, (Note: Formerly Aliabad County) Golestan province, Iran.

== Demographics ==
=== Population ===
At the time of the 2006 National Census, the village's population was 1,717 in 378 households. The following census in 2011 counted 1,804 people in 525 households. The 2016 census measured the population of the village as 2,048 people in 538 households.
