= Eslamabad-e Fenderesk =

Eslamabad-e Fenderesk اسلام آباد فندرسک
- Village
- Interactive map of Eslamabad-e Fenderesk
- Coordinates: 37°1′24.4″N 54°54′43.2″E
- Country: Iran
- Province: Golestan
- County: Aliabad
- Bakhsh: Central
- Rural District: Katul

Population (2016)
  - Total: 206
- Time zone: UTC+3:30 (IRST)

Eslamabad-e Fenderesk (Persian: اسلام آباد فندرسک, also Romanized as Eslāmābād-e Fenderesk) is a village in Katul Rural District, in the Central District of Aliabad County, Golestan Province, Iran. At the 2016 census, its population was 206, in 70 families. Down from 275 in 2006.
