= Marun Kalateh =

Village in Golestan province, Iran

Marun Kalateh Persian: مارون كلاته
- Village
- Location within Iran
- Coordinates: 36°58′10″N 54°46′33″E
- Country: Iran
- Province: Golestan
- County: Aliabad-e Katul
- District: Kamalan
- Rural District: Shirang

Population (2016)
  - Total: 911
- Time zone: UTC+3:30 (IRST)

Marun Kalateh (Persian: مارون كلاته) (Note: Also romanized as Mārūn Kalāteh; also known as Mārān Kalāteh) is a village in Shirang Rural District of Kamalan District in Aliabad-e Katul County, (Note: Formerly Aliabad County) Golestan province, Iran.

== Demographics ==
=== Population ===
At the time of the 2006 National Census, the village's population was 967 in 211 households. The following census in 2011 counted 986 people in 241 households. The 2016 census measured the population of the village as 911 people in 279 households.
