= Kuchek Astajiq =

Village in Golestan province, Iran

Kuchek Astajiq Persian: كوچک استاجيق
- Village
- Location within Iran
- Coordinates: 37°04′05″N 54°52′45″E
- Country: Iran
- Province: Golestan
- County: Aliabad-e Katul
- District: Central
- Rural District: Katul

Population (2016)
  - Total: 2,320
- Time zone: UTC+3:30 (IRST)

Kuchek Astajiq (Persian: كوچک استاجيق) (Note: Also romanized as Kūchek Astājīq) is a village in Katul Rural District of the Central District in Aliabad-e Katul County, (Note: Formerly Aliabad County) Golestan province, Iran.

== Demographics ==
=== Population ===
At the time of the 2006 National Census, the village's population was 2,086 in 441 households. The following census in 2011 counted 2,338 people in 582 households. The 2016 census measured the population of the village as 2,320 people in 676 households.
