= Kuchak-e Nazar Khani =

Village in Golestan province, Iran

Kuchak-e Nazar Khani Persian: كوچک نظرخانی
- Village
- Location within Iran
- Coordinates: 37°02′26″N 54°53′22″E
- Country: Iran
- Province: Golestan
- County: Aliabad-e Katul
- District: Central
- Rural District: Katul

Population (2016)
  - Total: 1,881
- Time zone: UTC+3:30 (IRST)

Kuchak-e Nazar Khani (Persian: كوچک نظرخانی) (Note: Also romanized as Kūchak-e Naz̧ar Khānī; also known as Kūchak-e Naz̧ar Khākī) is a village in Katul Rural District of the Central District in Aliabad-e Katul County, (Note: Formerly Aliabad County) Golestan province, Iran.

== Demographics ==
=== Population ===
At the time of the 2006 National Census, the village's population was 1,601 in 314 households. The following census in 2011 counted 1,945 people in 503 households. The 2016 census measured the population of the village as 1,881 people in 516 households.
