= Ziaabad, Golestan =

Village in Golestan province, Iran

Shojaabad Persian: ضيا اباد
- Village
- Location within Iran
- Coordinates: 36°57′50″N 54°46′10″E
- Country: Iran
- Province: Golestan
- County: Aliabad-e Katul
- District: Kamalan
- Rural District: Shirang

Population (2016)
  - Total: 326
- Time zone: UTC+3:30 (IRST)

Ziaabad (Persian: ضيا اباد) (Note: Also romanized as Ẕīā’ābād) is a village in Shirang Rural District of Kamalan District in Aliabad-e Katul County, (Note: Formerly Aliabad County) Golestan province, Iran.

== Demographics ==
=== Population ===
At the time of the 2006 National Census, the village's population was 272 in 60 households. The following census in 2011 counted 275 people in 73 households. The 2016 census measured the population of the village as 326 people in 100 households.
