= Mahian =

Village in Golestan province, Iran

Mahian Persian: ماهيان
- Village
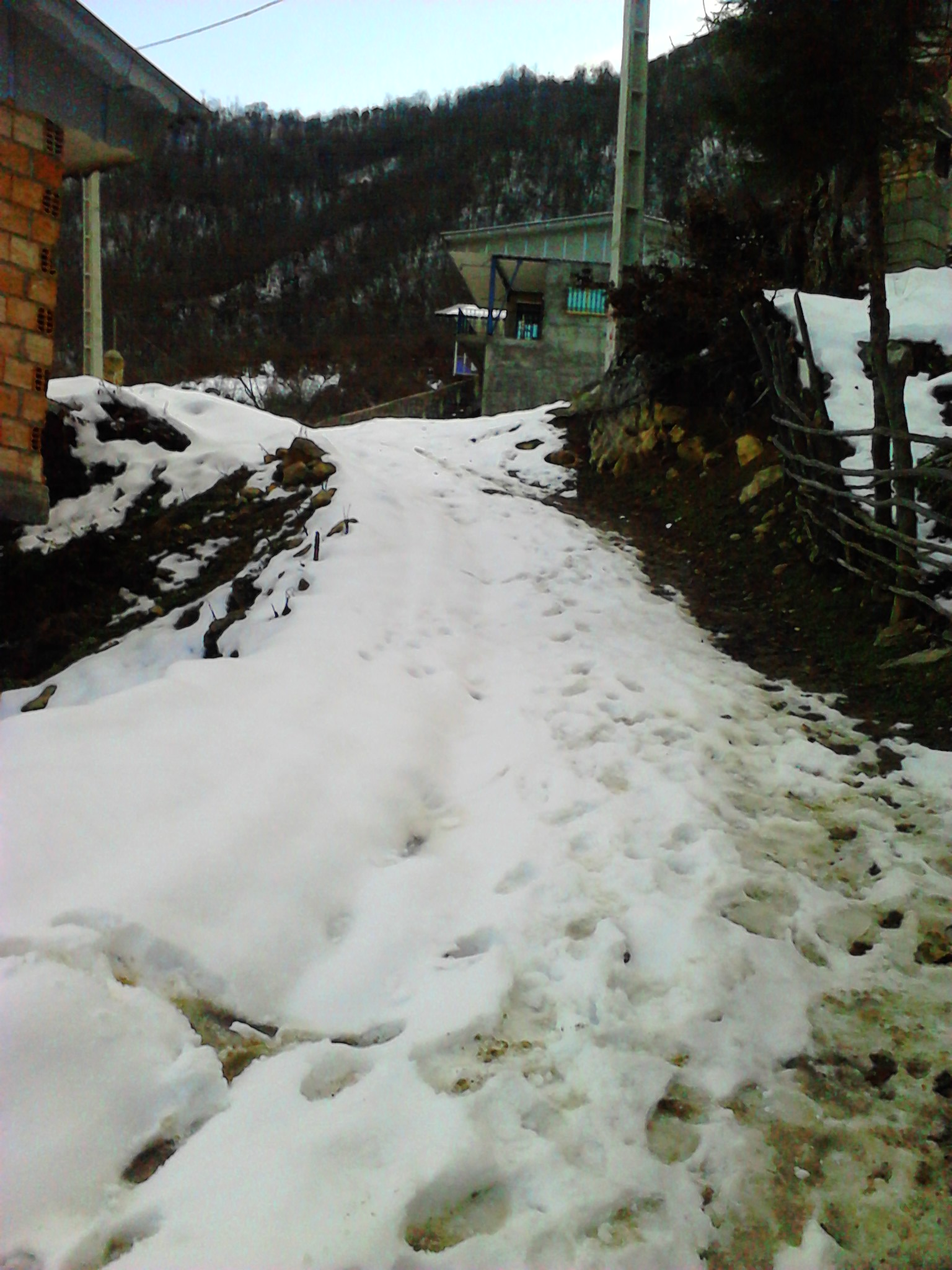
- A snow-covered street in the village of Mahian

- Location within Iran
- Coordinates: 36°45′53″N 54°46′54″E
- Country: Iran
- Province: Golestan
- County: Aliabad-e Katul
- District: Kamalan
- Rural District: Estarabad

Population (2016)
  - Total: 98
- Time zone: UTC+3:30 (IRST)

Mahian (Persian: ماهيان) (Note: Also romanized as Māhīān) is a village in Estarabad Rural District of Kamalan District in Aliabad-e Katul County, (Note: Formerly Aliabad County) Golestan province, Iran.

== Demographics ==
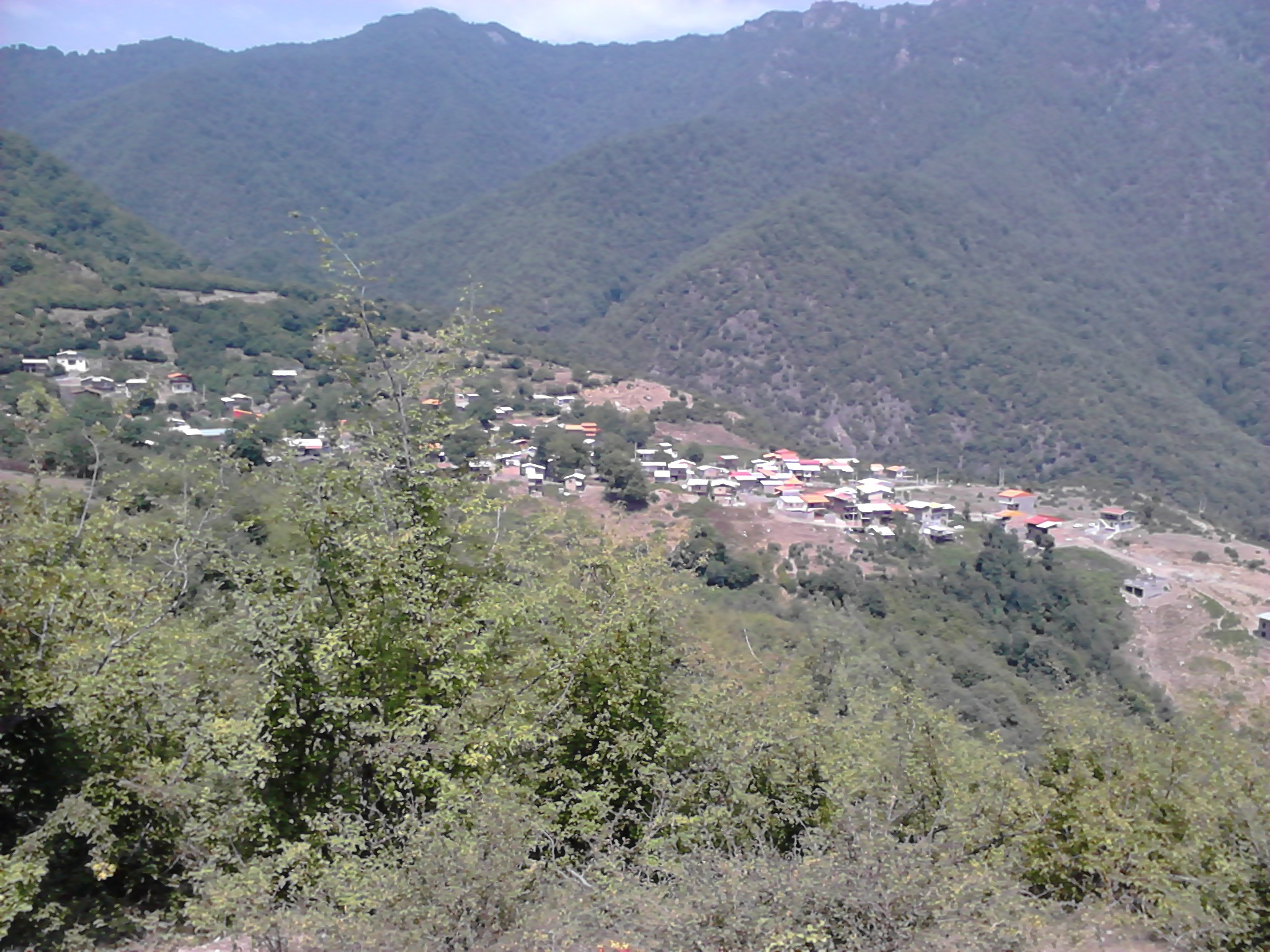
Mahian village

=== Population ===
At the time of the 2006 National Census, the village's population was 25 in seven households. The village did not appear in the following census of 2011. The 2016 census measured the population of the village as 98 people in 31 households.
