= Siah Rudbar, Golestan =

Village in Golestan province, Iran

Siah Rudbar Persian: سياه رودبار
- Village
- Location within Iran
- Coordinates: 36°49′01″N 55°02′46″E
- Country: Iran
- Province: Golestan
- County: Aliabad-e Katul
- District: Central
- Rural District: Zarrin Gol

Population (2016)
  - Total: 295
- Time zone: UTC+3:30 (IRST)

Siah Rudbar (Persian: سياه رودبار) (Note: Also romanized as Sīāh Rūdbār) is a village in Zarrin Gol Rural District of the Central District in Aliabad-e Katul County, (Note: Formerly Aliabad County) Golestan province, Iran.

== Demographics ==
=== Population ===
At the time of the 2006 National Census, the village's population was 266 in 77 households. The following census in 2011 counted 300 people in 94 households. The 2016 census measured the population of the village as 295 people in 98 households.
