= Ashurbay =

Village in Golestan province, Iran

Ashurbay Persian: اشورباي
- Village
- Location within Iran
- Coordinates: 37°00′22″N 54°41′34″E
- Country: Iran
- Province: Golestan
- County: Aliabad-e Katul
- District: Kamalan
- Rural District: Shirang

Population (2016)
  - Total: 1,262
- Time zone: UTC+3:30 (IRST)

Ashurbay (Persian: اشورباي) (Note: Also romanized as Āshūrbāy) is a village in Shirang Rural District of Kamalan District in Aliabad-e Katul County, (Note: Formerly Aliabad County) Golestan province, Iran.

== Demographics ==
=== Population ===
At the time of the 2006 National Census, the village's population was 958 in 221 households. The following census in 2011 counted 1,190 people in 316 households. The 2016 census measured the population of the village as 1,262 people in 353 households.
