= Kordabad, Golestan =

Village in Golestan province, Iran

Kordabad Persian: كرداباد
- Village
- Location within Iran
- Coordinates: 36°53′52″N 54°54′32″E
- Country: Iran
- Province: Golestan
- County: Aliabad-e Katul
- District: Central
- Rural District: Zarrin Gol

Population (2016)
  - Total: 1,745
- Time zone: UTC+3:30 (IRST)

Kordabad (Persian: كرداباد) (Note: Also romanized as Kordābād)) is a village in, and the capital of, Zarrin Gol Rural District in the Central District of Aliabad-e Katul County, (Note: Formerly Aliabad County) Golestan province, Iran.

== Demographics ==
=== Population ===
At the time of the 2006 National Census, the village's population was 1,458 in 380 households. The following census in 2011 counted 1,684 people in 493 households. The 2016 census measured the population of the village as 1,745 people in 558 households.
