= Owdak Duji =

Village in Golestan province, Iran

Owdak Duji Persian: اودك دوجي
- Village
- Location within Iran
- Coordinates: 37°00′46″N 54°46′32″E
- Country: Iran
- Province: Golestan
- County: Aliabad-e Katul
- District: Central
- Rural District: Katul

Population (2016)
  - Total: 2,691
- Time zone: UTC+3:30 (IRST)

Owdak Duji (Persian: اودك دوجي) (Note: Also romanized as Owdak Dūjī; also known as Dūjī Owdak) is a village in Katul Rural District of the Central District in Aliabad-e Katul County, (Note: Formerly Aliabad County) Golestan province, Iran.

== Demographics ==
=== Population ===
At the time of the 2006 National Census, the village's population was 2,221 in 444 households. The following census in 2011 counted 2,527 people in 668 households. The 2016 census measured the population of the village as 2,691 people in 746 households. It was the most populous village in its rural district.
