= Hajjiabad, Aliabad =

Hajjiabad حاجی آباد
- village
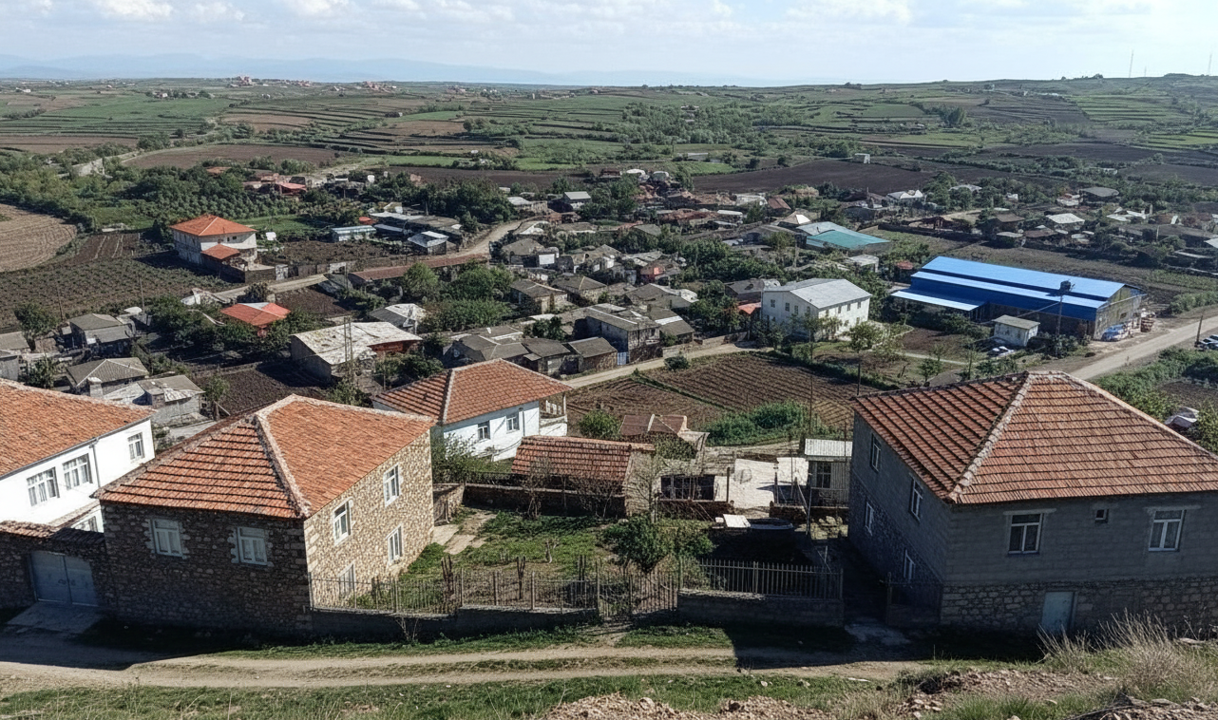

- Location within Iran
- Coordinates: 36°57′29″N 54°50′13″E
- Country: Iran
- Province: Golestan
- County: Aliabad
- Bakhsh: Central
- Rural District: Katul

Population (2016)
  - Total: 317
- Time zone: UTC+3:30 (IRST)

Hajjiabad (Persian: حاجی آباد, also Romanized as Ḩājjīābād) is a village in Katul Rural District, in the Central District of Aliabad County, Golestan Province, Iran. At the 2016 census, its population was 317, in 103 families. Down from 364 people in 2006.
