= Badraq =

Badraq (Persian: بدراق) may refer to:

- Badraq-e Aneh Galdi
- Badraq-e Molla
- Badraq-e Nuri
