= Alustan =

Alustan آلوستان
- Village
- Location within Iran
- Coordinates: 36°57′42″N 54°50′14″E
- Country: Iran
- Province: Golestan
- County: Aliabad
- Bakhsh: Central
- Rural District: Katul

Population (2016)
  - Total: 367
- Time zone: UTC+3:30 (IRST)

Alustan (Persian: آلوستان, also Romanized as Ālūstān and Alūstān) is a village in Katul Rural District, in the Central District of Aliabad County, Golestan Province, Iran. At the 2006 census, its population was 430, in 112 families. In 2016, its population was 367, in 123 households.
