= Zarrin Gol =

Zarrin Gol or Zarin Gol or Zaringul or Zarringul (Persian: زرين گل) may refer to:

- Zarrin Gol, Golestan
- Zarrin Gol, Zanjan
- Zarrin Gol Rural District, in Golestan Province
