= Jahan Bini =

Village in Golestan province, Iran

Jahan Bini Persian: جهان بيني
- Village
- Location within Iran
- Coordinates: 36°57′33″N 54°43′51″E
- Country: Iran
- Province: Golestan
- County: Aliabad-e Katul
- District: Kamalan
- Rural District: Shirang

Population (2016)
  - Total: 500
- Time zone: UTC+3:30 (IRST)

Jahan Bini (Persian: جهان بيني) (Note: Also romanized as Jahān Bīnī; also known as Jahān Bīn) is a village in Shirang Rural District of Kamalan District in Aliabad-e Katul County, (Note: Formerly Aliabad County) Golestan province, Iran.

== Demographics ==
=== Population ===
At the time of the 2006 National Census, the village's population was 483 in 116 households. The following census in 2011 counted 482 people in 138 households. The 2016 census measured the population of the village as 500 people in 159 households.
