= Barfatan =

Village in Golestan province, Iran

Barfatan Persian: برفتان
- Village
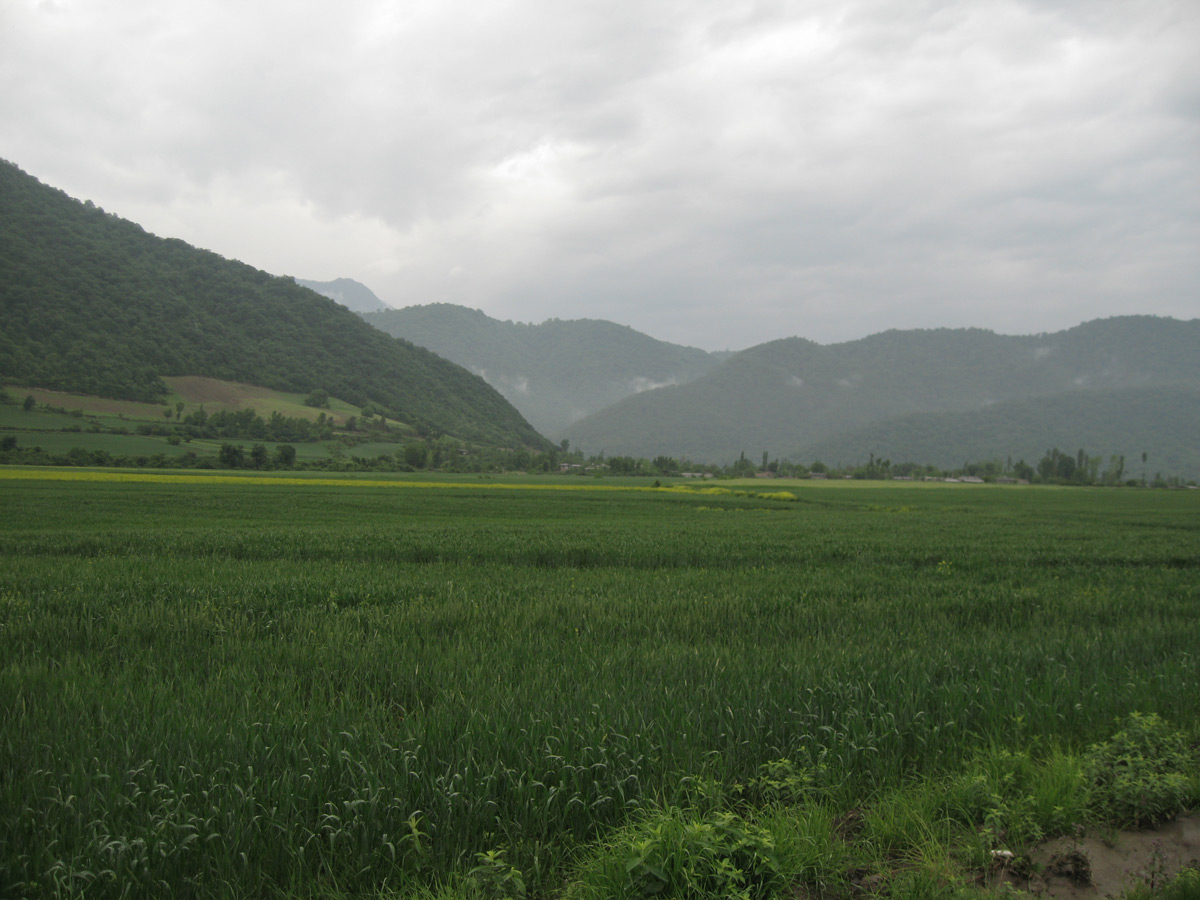

- Location within Iran
- Coordinates: 36°53′05″N 54°47′54″E
- Country: Iran
- Province: Golestan
- County: Aliabad-e Katul
- District: Kamalan
- Rural District: Estarabad

Population (2016)
  - Total: 1,659
- Time zone: UTC+3:30 (IRST)

Barfatan (Persian: برفتان) (Note: Also romanized as Baraftān and Barfatān) is a village in Estarabad Rural District of Kamalan District in Aliabad-e Katul County, (Note: Formerly Aliabad County) Golestan province, Iran.

== Demographics ==
=== Population ===
At the time of the 2006 National Census, the village's population was 1,837 in 479 households. The following census in 2011 counted 1,894 people in 580 households. The 2016 census measured the population of the village as 1,659 people in 554 households.
