= Nosratabad, Aliabad =

Nosratabad نصرت آباد
- Village
- Location within Iran
- Coordinates: 36°56′13″N 54°49′39″E
- Country: Iran
- Province: Golestan
- County: Aliabad
- Bakhsh: Central
- Rural District: Katul

Population (2016)
  - Total: 546
- Time zone: UTC+3:30 (IRST)

Nosratabad (Persian: نصرت آباد, also Romanized as Noşratābād) is a village in Katul Rural District, in the Central District of Aliabad County, Golestan Province, Iran. At the 2016 census, its population was 546, in 170 families. Down from 563 in 2006.
