= Aliabad-e Katul =

City in Golestan province, Iran

Aliabad-e Katul علی‌آباد کتول
- City
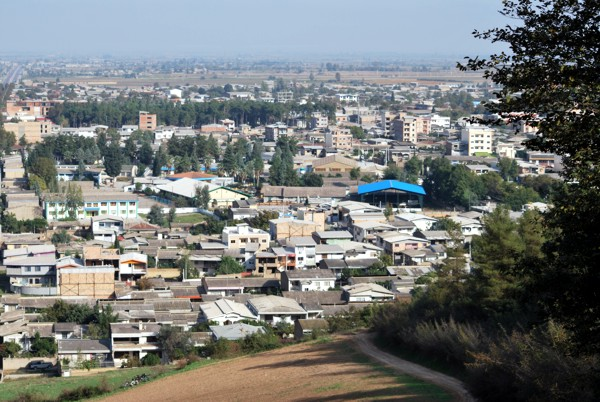
- Aliabad-e Katul

- Location within Iran
- Coordinates: 36°54′27″N 54°52′00″E
- Country: Iran
- Province: Golestan
- County: Aliabad-e Katul
- District: Central

Population (2016)
  - Total: 52,838
- Time zone: UTC+3:30 (IRST)

Aliabad-e Katul (Persian: علی‌آباد كتول) (Note: Also romanized as Aliabad-e Katool, Aliâbâd Katool, and ‘Alīābād-e Katūl; also known as Aliabad (علی‌آباد), also romanized as ‘Alīābād) is a city in the Central District of Aliabad-e Katul County, (Note: Formerly Aliabad County) Golestan province, Iran, serving as capital of both the county and the district. The city is on a hillside of the Alborz Mountains between Gorgan and Azad Shahr. The Kaboud-val waterfall is near the city. Nearby are the villages of Kholin Darreh, Chinu, Alestan, and Mayan.

== Demographics ==
=== Language ===
The people of Aliabad-e Katul speak a dialect of Mazandarani language called Katuli.

=== Population ===
At the time of the 2006 National Census, the city's population was 46,183 in 11,676 households. The following census in 2011 counted 49,804 people in 14,377 households. The 2016 census measured the population of the city as 52,838 people in 16,655 households.

== Gallery ==
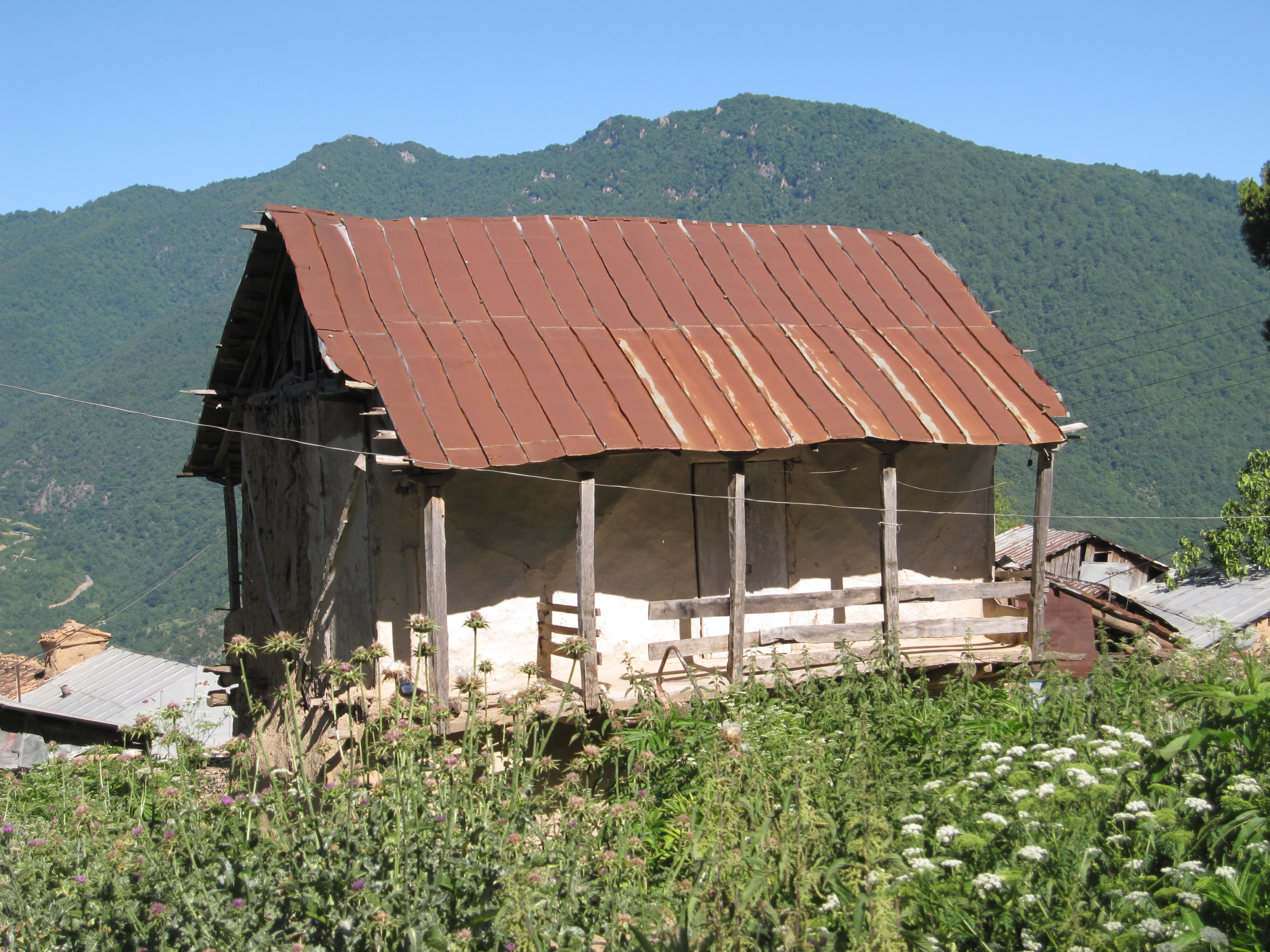
A traditional house near Aliabad-e Katul, Iran

== Climate ==
Climate data for Aliabad-e Katul (station coordinates:36.91°N 54.91°E, 2007-2016 normals)
Month	Jan	Feb	Mar	Apr	May	Jun	Jul	Aug	Sep	Oct	Nov	Dec	Year
Average precipitation mm (inches)	64.53 (2.54)	98.68 (3.89)	89.72 (3.53)	54.59 (2.15)	30.77 (1.21)	32.92 (1.30)	26.33 (1.04)	37.47 (1.48)	77.80 (3.06)	67.79 (2.67)	68.70 (2.70)	58.49 (2.30)	707.79 (27.87)

- Media related to Aliabad-e Katul at Wikimedia Commons
