= Ganu =

Ganu or Genow or Ganoo (Persian: گنو) may refer to:

- Ganu, Golestan
- Genow, Hormozgan
- Terengganu, a Malaysian state
