= Chinu =

Chinu may refer to:

- Chinú, a town in Colombia
- Chinu, Aliabad, a village in Iran
- Chinu Xxx, a British wrestler
