= Badraq-e Aneh Galdi =

Badraq-e Aneh Galdi بدراق انه گلدی
- Village
- Location within Iran
- Coordinates: 37°02′41″N 54°51′53″E
- Country: Iran
- Province: Golestan
- County: Aliabad
- Bakhsh: Central
- Rural District: Katul

Population (2016)
  - Total: 446
- Time zone: UTC+3:30 (IRST)

Badraq-e Aneh Galdi (Persian: بدراق انه گلدی, also Romanized as Badrāq-e Āneh Galdī; also known as Badrāq-e Ānāgolī and Badrāq-e Ānāgaldī) is a village in Katul Rural District, in the Central District of Aliabad County, Golestan Province, Iran. At the 2006 census, its population was 423, in 82 families. In 2016, its population was 446, in 119 households.
