= Shirang-e Sofla =

Village in Golestan province, Iran

Shirang-e Sofla Persian: شيرنگ سفلي
- Village
- Location within Iran
- Coordinates: 36°57′16″N 54°43′08″E
- Country: Iran
- Province: Golestan
- County: Aliabad-e Katul
- District: Kamalan
- Rural District: Shirang

Population (2016)
  - Total: 470
- Time zone: UTC+3:30 (IRST)

Shirang-e Sofla (Persian: شيرنگ سفلي) (Note: Also romanized as Shīrang-e Soflá; also known as Shīrang-e Pā’īn) is a village in Shirang Rural District of Kamalan District in Aliabad-e Katul County, (Note: Formerly Aliabad County) Golestan province, Iran.

== Demographics ==
=== Population ===
At the time of the 2006 National Census, the village's population was 393 in 103 households. The following census in 2011 counted 358 people in 100 households. The 2016 census measured the population of the village as 470 people in 147 households.
