= Sangdevin =

City in Golestan province, Iran

Sangdevin Persian: سنگدوين
- City
- Location within Iran
- Coordinates: 36°59′51″N 54°51′23″E
- Country: Iran
- Province: Golestan
- County: Aliabad-e Katul
- District: Central
- Established as a city: 2013

Population (2016)
  - Total: 4,203
- Time zone: UTC+3:30 (IRST)

Sangdevin (Persian: سنگدوين) (Note: Also romanized as Sangdevīn) is a city in the Central District of Aliabad-e Katul County, (Note: Formerly Aliabad County) Golestan province, Iran.

== Demographics ==
=== Population ===
At the time of the 2006 National Census, Sangdevin's population was 3,671 in 862 households, when it was a village in Katul Rural District. The following census in 2011 counted 4,119 people in 1,180 households. The 2016 census measured the population as 4,203 people in 1,255 households, by which time the village had been converted to a city.
