= Alaman =

Alaman or Alamán may refer to:

- Alaman, Gilan, a village in Gilan Province, Iran
- Alaman, Golestan, a village in Golestan Province, Iran
- Alemanni or Alamans, a Germanic tribe
- Lucas Alamán (1792–1853), Mexican statesman and scientist
- Rafael Pacchiano Alamán (born 1975), Mexican politician
