= Alaman, Golestan =

Village in Golestan province, Iran

Alaman Persian: الامن
- Village
- Location within Iran
- Coordinates: 36°51′57″N 54°46′04″E
- Country: Iran
- Province: Golestan
- County: Aliabad-e Katul
- District: Kamalan
- Rural District: Estarabad

Population (2016)
  - Total: 153
- Time zone: UTC+3:30 (IRST)

Alaman (Persian: الامن) (Note: Also romanized as Alāman; also known as Elāyen and Ţalāben) is a village in Estarabad Rural District of Kamalan District in Aliabad-e Katul County, (Note: Formerly Aliabad County) Golestan province, Iran.

== Demographics ==
=== Population ===
At the time of the 2006 National Census, the village's population was 135 in 39 households. The following census in 2011 counted 149 people in 49 households. The 2016 census measured the population of the village as 153 people in 55 households.
