= Genu =

Genu, a Latin word for "knee," may refer to:

- Genu of internal capsule
- Genu of the corpus callosum
- Genu recurvatum
- Genu valgum
- Genu varum
- Genu, Iran (disambiguation), places in Iran
