= Badraq-e Nuri =

Village in Golestan province, Iran

Badraq-e Nuri Persian: بدراق نوري
- Village
- Location within Iran
- Coordinates: 37°03′15″N 54°49′48″E
- Country: Iran
- Province: Golestan
- County: Aliabad-e Katul
- District: Central
- Rural District: Katul

Population (2016)
  - Total: 2,283
- Time zone: UTC+3:30 (IRST)

Badraq-e Nuri (Persian: بدراق نوري) (Note: Also romanized as Badrāq-e Nūrī) is a village in Katul Rural District of the Central District in Aliabad-e Katul County, (Note: Formerly Aliabad County) Golestan province, Iran.

== Demographics ==
=== Population ===
At the time of the 2006 National Census, the village's population was 2,039 in 397 households. The following census in 2011 counted 2,156 people in 574 households. The 2016 census measured the population of the village as 2,283 people in 623 households.
