= Khatamabad, Golestan =

Khatamabad خاتم آباد
- Village
- Interactive map of Khatamabad
- Coordinates: 37°0′18.2″N 54°48′10″E
- Country: Iran
- Province: Golestan
- County: Aliabad
- Bakhsh: Central
- Rural District: Katul

Population (2016)
  - Total: 255
- Time zone: UTC+3:30 (IRST)

Khatamabad (Persian: خاتم آباد, also Romanized as Khātamābād) is a village in Katul Rural District, in the Central District of Aliabad County, Golestan Province, Iran. At the 2006 census, its population was 255, in 73 families.
