= Zarrin Gol, Golestan =

Village in Golestan province, Iran

Zarrin Gol Persian: زرين گل
- Village
- Location within Iran
- Coordinates: 36°52′56″N 54°57′36″E
- Country: Iran
- Province: Golestan
- County: Aliabad-e Katul
- District: Central
- Rural District: Zarrin Gol

Population (2016)
  - Total: 612
- Time zone: UTC+3:30 (IRST)

Zarrin Gol (Persian: زرين گل) (Note: Also romanized as Zarrīn Gol; also known as Zarīngul) is a village in Zarrin Gol Rural District of the Central District in Aliabad-e Katul County, (Note: Formerly Aliabad County) Golestan province, Iran.

== Demographics ==
=== Population ===
At the time of the 2006 National Census, the village's population was 625 in 156 households. The following census in 2011 counted 604 people in 172 households. The 2016 census measured the population of the village as 612 people in 194 households.
