= Nasarkan-e Olya =

Village in Golestan province, Iran

Nasarkan-e Olya Persian: نصركان عليا
- Village
- Location within Iran
- Coordinates: 36°57′55″N 54°41′43″E
- Country: Iran
- Province: Golestan
- County: Aliabad-e Katul
- District: Kamalan
- Rural District: Shirang

Population (2016)
  - Total: 539
- Time zone: UTC+3:30 (IRST)

Nasarkan-e Olya (Persian: نصركان عليا) (Note: Also romanized as Naşarkān-e ‘Olyā; also known as Naşarkān) is a village in Shirang Rural District of Kamalan District in Aliabad-e Katul County, (Note: Formerly Aliabad County) Golestan province, Iran.

== Demographics ==
=== Population ===
At the time of the 2006 National Census, the village's population was 542 in 123 households. The following census in 2011 counted 592 people in 161 households. The 2016 census measured the population of the village as 539 people in 151 households.
