= Ganu, Golestan =

Village in Golestan province, Iran

Ganu Persian: گنو
- Village
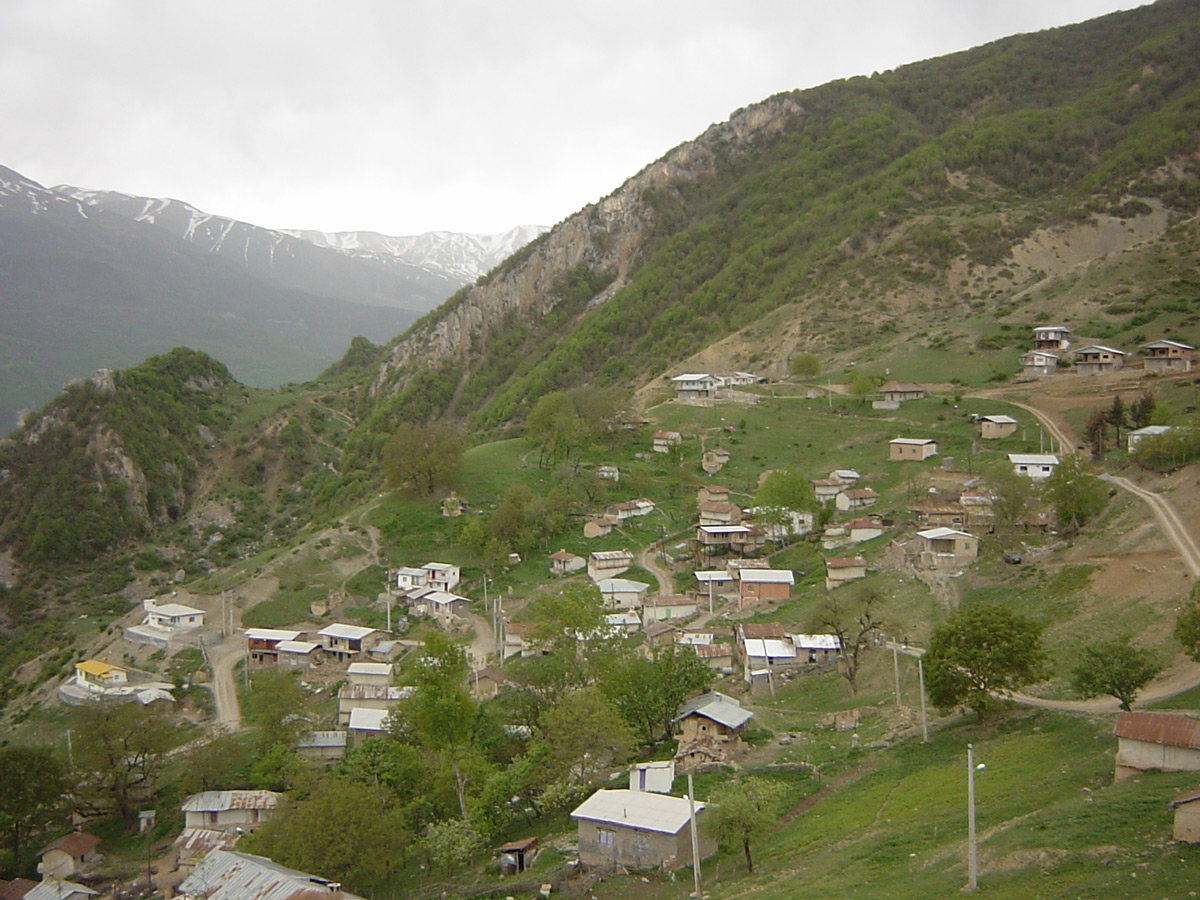
- The village of Ganu

- Location within Iran
- Coordinates: 36°43′35″N 54°47′07″E
- Country: Iran
- Province: Golestan
- County: Aliabad-e Katul
- District: Kamalan
- Rural District: Estarabad

Population (2016)
  - Total: 85
- Time zone: UTC+3:30 (IRST)

Ganu (Persian: گنو) (Note: Also romanized as Ganū) is a mountainous village in Estarabad Rural District of Kamalan District in Aliabad-e Katul County, (Note: Formerly Aliabad County) Golestan province, Iran.

== Demographics ==
=== Population ===
At the time of the 2006 National Census, the village's population was 10 in four households. The following census in 2011 counted 21 people in seven households. The 2016 census measured the population of the village as 85 people in 27 households.

== See also ==
Media related to Ganu, Golestan at Wikimedia Commons
