= Alestan =

Village in Golestan province, Iran

Alestan Persian: الستان
- Village
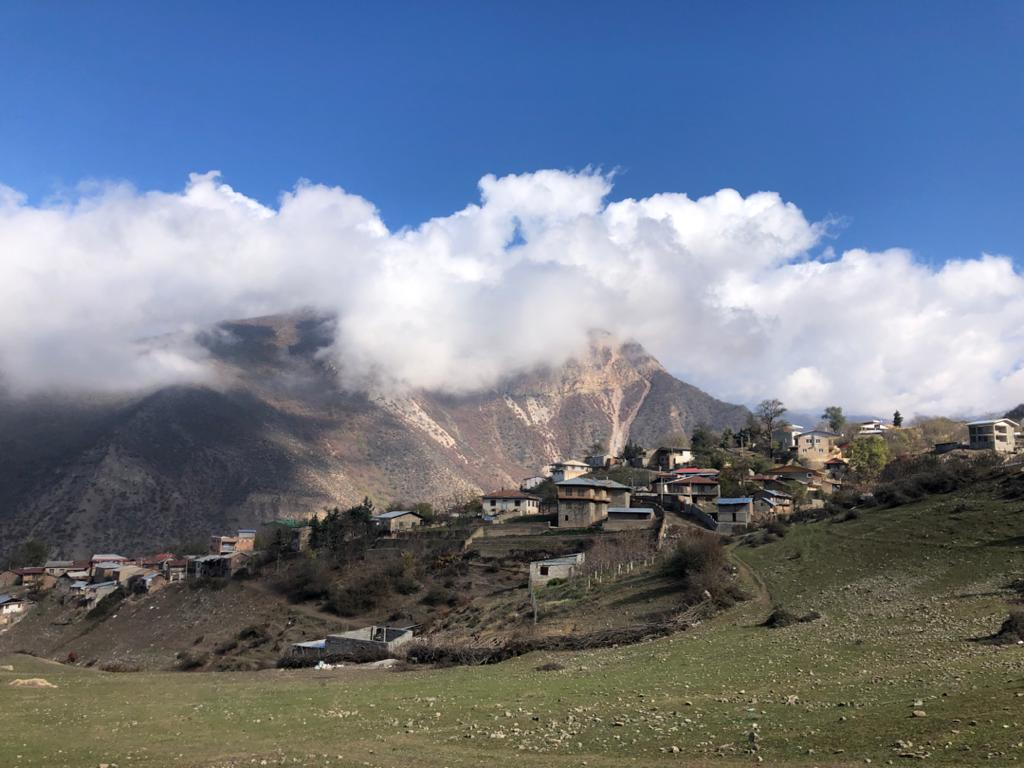

- Location within Iran
- Coordinates: 36°43′19″N 54°50′37″E
- Country: Iran
- Province: Golestan
- County: Aliabad-e Katul
- District: Kamalan
- Rural District: Estarabad

Population (2016)
  - Total: 116
- Time zone: UTC+3:30 (IRST)

Alestan (Persian: الستان) (Note: Also romanized as Alestān) is a village in Estarabad Rural District of Kamalan District in Aliabad-e Katul County, (Note: Formerly Aliabad County) Golestan province, Iran.

== Demographics ==
=== Population ===
At the time of the 2006 National Census, the village's population was 25 in 11 households. The following census in 2011 counted 32 people in 10 households. The 2016 census measured the population of the village as 116 people in 40 households.
