= Nasarkan =

Nasarkan (Persian: نصركان) may refer to:

- Nasarkan-e Olya
- Nasarkan-e Sofla
