= Shirang-e Olya =

Village in Golestan province, Iran

Shirang-e Olya Persian: شيرنگ عليا
- Village
- Location within Iran
- Coordinates: 36°56′57″N 54°42′57″E
- Country: Iran
- Province: Golestan
- County: Aliabad-e Katul
- District: Kamalan
- Rural District: Shirang

Population (2016)
  - Total: 2,206
- Time zone: UTC+3:30 (IRST)

Shirang-e Olya (Persian: شيرنگ عليا) (Note: Also romanized as Shīrang-e ‘Olyā; also known as Shīrang-e Bālā) is a village in, and the capital of, Shirang Rural District in Kamalan District of Aliabad-e Katul County, (Note: Formerly Aliabad County) Golestan province, Iran.

== Demographics ==
=== Population ===
At the time of the 2006 National Census, the village's population was 2,206 in 521 households. The following census in 2011 counted 2,204 people in 611 households. The 2016 census measured the population of the village as 2,206 people in 676 households.
