= Chinu, Iran =

Village in Golestan province, Iran

Chinu Persian: چينو
- Village
- Location within Iran
- Coordinates: 36°50′31″N 54°56′19″E
- Country: Iran
- Province: Golestan
- County: Aliabad-e Katul
- District: Central
- Rural District: Zarrin Gol

Population (2016)
  - Total: 98
- Time zone: UTC+3:30 (IRST)

Chinu (Persian: چينو) (Note: Also romanized as Chīnū) is a village in Zarrin Gol Rural District of the Central District in Aliabad-e Katul County, (Note: Formerly Aliabad County) Golestan province, Iran.

== Demographics ==
=== Population ===
At the time of the 2006 National Census, the village's population was 85 in 21 households. The following census in 2011 counted 138 people in 38 households. The 2016 census measured the population of the village as 98 people in 33 households.
