= Zarrin Gol Rural District =

Rural district in Golestan province, Iran

Zarrin Gol Rural District Persian: دهستان زرين گل
- Rural District
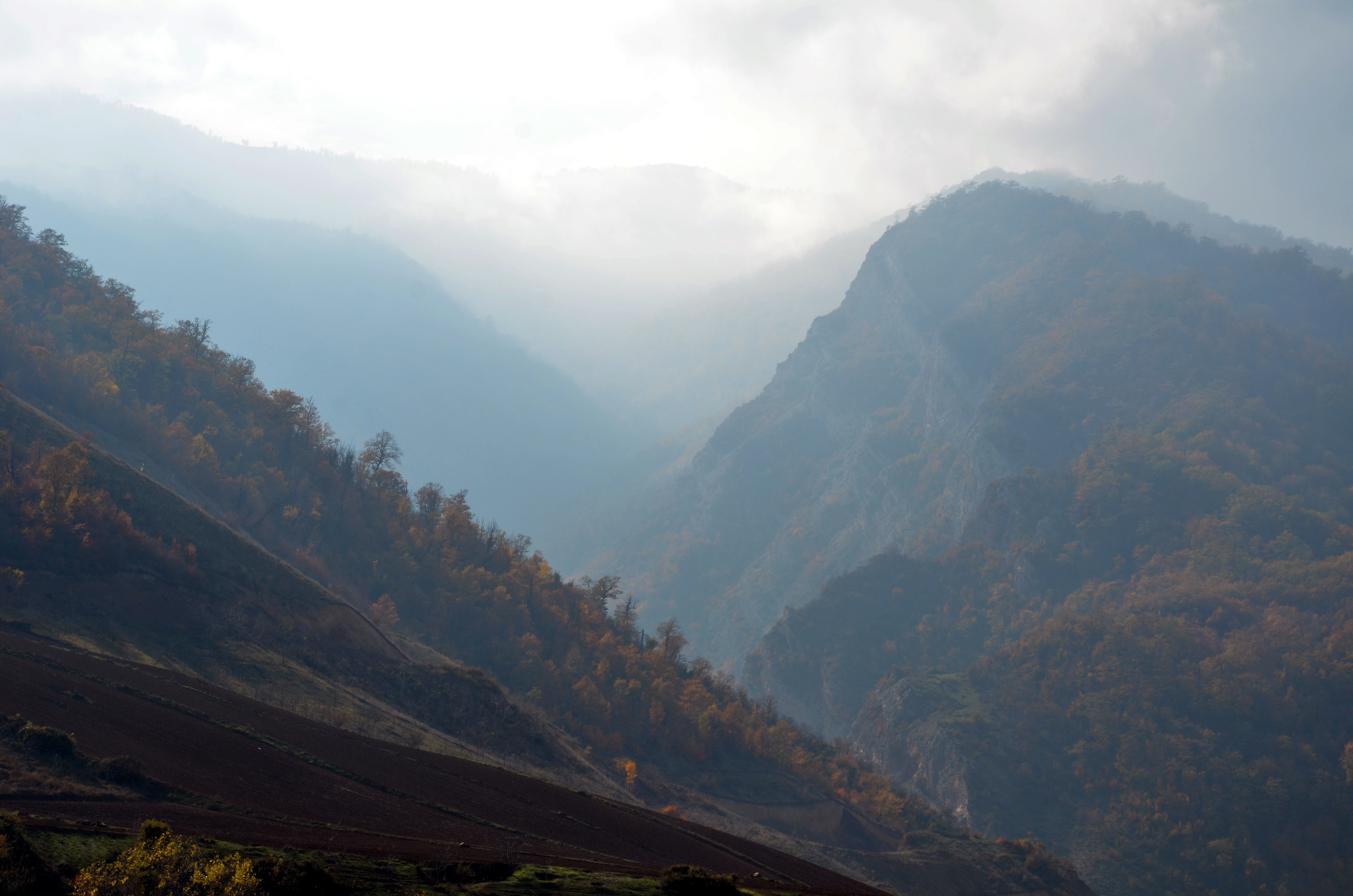
- Abr Forest in autumn

- Location within Iran
- Coordinates: 36°50′N 54°59′E
- Country: Iran
- Province: Golestan
- County: Aliabad-e Katul
- District: Central
- Established: 2000
- Capital: Kordabad

Population (2016)
  - Total: 10,175
- Time zone: UTC+3:30 (IRST)

Zarrin Gol Rural District (Persian: دهستان زرين گل) is in the Central District of Aliabad-e Katul County, (Note: Formerly Aliabad County) Golestan province, Iran. Its capital is the village of Kordabad.

== Demographics ==
=== Population ===
At the time of the 2006 National Census, the rural district's population was 9,292 in 2,194 households. There were 9,785 inhabitants in 2,745 households at the following census of 2011. The 2016 census measured the population of the rural district as 10,175 in 2,997 households. The most populous of its 14 villages was Mehdiabad, with 2,848 people.

=== Other villages in the rural district ===
- Afratakhteh
- Alazman
- Amirabad-e Sorkh Mahalleh
- Chinu
- Khak-e Pir-e Zan
- Mian Rostaq
- Shirinabad
- Siah Rudbar
- Zarrin Gol
