= Genow, Hormozgan =

Genow گنو
- Village
- Location within Iran
- Coordinates: 27°26′44″N 56°18′18″E
- Country: Iran
- Province: Hormozgan
- County: Bandar Abbas
- Bakhsh: Central
- Rural District: Isin

Population (2006)
  - Total: 296
- Time zone: UTC+3:30 (IRST)
  - Summer (DST): UTC+4:30 (IRDT)

Genow (Persian: گنو, also Romanized as Ganoo; also known as Āb Garm-e Genow and Āb Garm-e Genū) is a village in Isin Rural District, in the Central District of Bandar Abbas County, Hormozgan Province, Iran. At the 2006 census, its population was 296, in 72 families.
