= Shirang Rural District =

Rural district in Golestan province, Iran

Shirang Rural District Persian: دهستان شيرنگ
- Rural District
- Location within Iran
- Coordinates: 36°58′N 54°46′E
- Country: Iran
- Province: Golestan
- County: Aliabad-e Katul
- District: Kamalan
- Established: 2000
- Capital: Shirang-e Olya

Population (2016)
  - Total: 14,120
- Time zone: UTC+3:30 (IRST)

Shirang Rural District (Persian: دهستان شيرنگ) is in Kamalan District of Aliabad-e Katul County, (Note: Formerly Aliabad County) Golestan province, Iran. Its capital is the village of Shirang-e Olya.

== Demographics ==
=== Population ===
At the time of the 2006 National Census, the rural district's population was 12,339 in 2,767 households. There were 12,927 inhabitants in 3,542 households at the following census of 2011. The 2016 census measured the population of the rural district as 14,120 in 3,899 households. The most populous of its 14 villages was Qarah Bolagh, with 3,308 people.

=== Other villages in the rural district ===
- Ahmadabad
- Ashurbay
- Azadtappeh
- Baqerabad
- Jahan Bini
- Kuzeh Li
- Marun Kalateh
- Nasarkan-e Olya
- Shirang-e Sofla
- Shojaabad
- Zabihabad
- Ziaabad
