= Katul Rural District =

Rural district in Golestan province, Iran

Katul Rural District Persian: دهستان كتول
- Rural District
- Location within Iran
- Coordinates: 37°00′N 54°50′E
- Country: Iran
- Province: Golestan
- County: Aliabad-e Katul
- District: Central
- Established: 1987
- Capital: Mazraeh

Population (2016)
  - Total: 26,732
- Time zone: UTC+3:30 (IRST)

Katul Rural District (Persian: دهستان كتول) is in the Central District of Aliabad-e Katul County, (Note: Formerly Aliabad County) Golestan province, Iran. It is administered from the city of Mazraeh.

== Demographics ==
=== Population ===
At the time of the 2006 National Census, the rural district's population was 33,729 in 7,762 households. There were 35,873 inhabitants in 10,089 households at the following census of 2011. The 2016 census measured the population of the rural district as 26,732 in 7,801 households. The most populous of its 28 villages was Owdak Duji, with 2,691 people.

=== Other villages in the rural district ===
- Alustan
- Amirabad-e Fenderesk
- Arfanabad
- Badraq-e Aneh Galdi
- Badraq-e Nuri
- Bagheh-ye Shur Tappeh Nafas
- Bahalkeh-ye Nafas
- Baluchabad
- Boluk-e Gholam
- Emamabad-e Sistaniha
- Eslamabad-e Fenderesk
- Hajji Kalateh
- Hajjiabad
- Hakimabad
- Hasan Tabib
- Hoseynabad
- Khatamabad
- Kuchak-e Nazar Khani
- Kuchek Astajiq
- Masumabad-e Fenderesk
- Nosratabad
- Owdak Duji
- Pichak Mahalleh
- Qushkorpi
- Savar Kalateh
- Zaboli Mahalleh-ye Mahastan
