= Fazelabad, Golestan =

City in Golestan province, Iran

Fazelabad Persian: فاضل آباد
- City
- Location within Iran
- Coordinates: 36°53′54″N 54°45′03″E
- Country: Iran
- Province: Golestan
- County: Aliabad-e Katul
- District: Kamalan
- Established as a city: 2001

Population (2016)
  - Total: 19,461
- Time zone: UTC+3:30 (IRST)

Fazelabad (Persian: فاضل آباد) (Note: Also romanized as Fāẕelābād; formerly Feyzabad (فِيز آباد), also romanized as Feyzābād) is a city in, and the capital of, Kamalan District in Aliabad-e Katul County, (Note: Formerly Aliabad County) Golestan province, Iran. It also serves as the administrative center for Estarabad Rural District. The village of Fazelabad was converted to a city in 2001.

== Demographics ==
=== Language ===
The people of Fazelabad speak a dialect of Mazandarani language called Katuli.

=== Population ===
At the time of the 2006 National Census, the city's population was 13,060 in 3,154 households. The following census in 2011 counted 14,548 people in 4,084 households. The 2016 census measured the population of the city as 19,461 people in 5,869 households.
