= Estarabad Rural District =

Rural district in Golestan province, Iran

Estarabad Rural District Persian: دهستان استرآباد
- Rural District
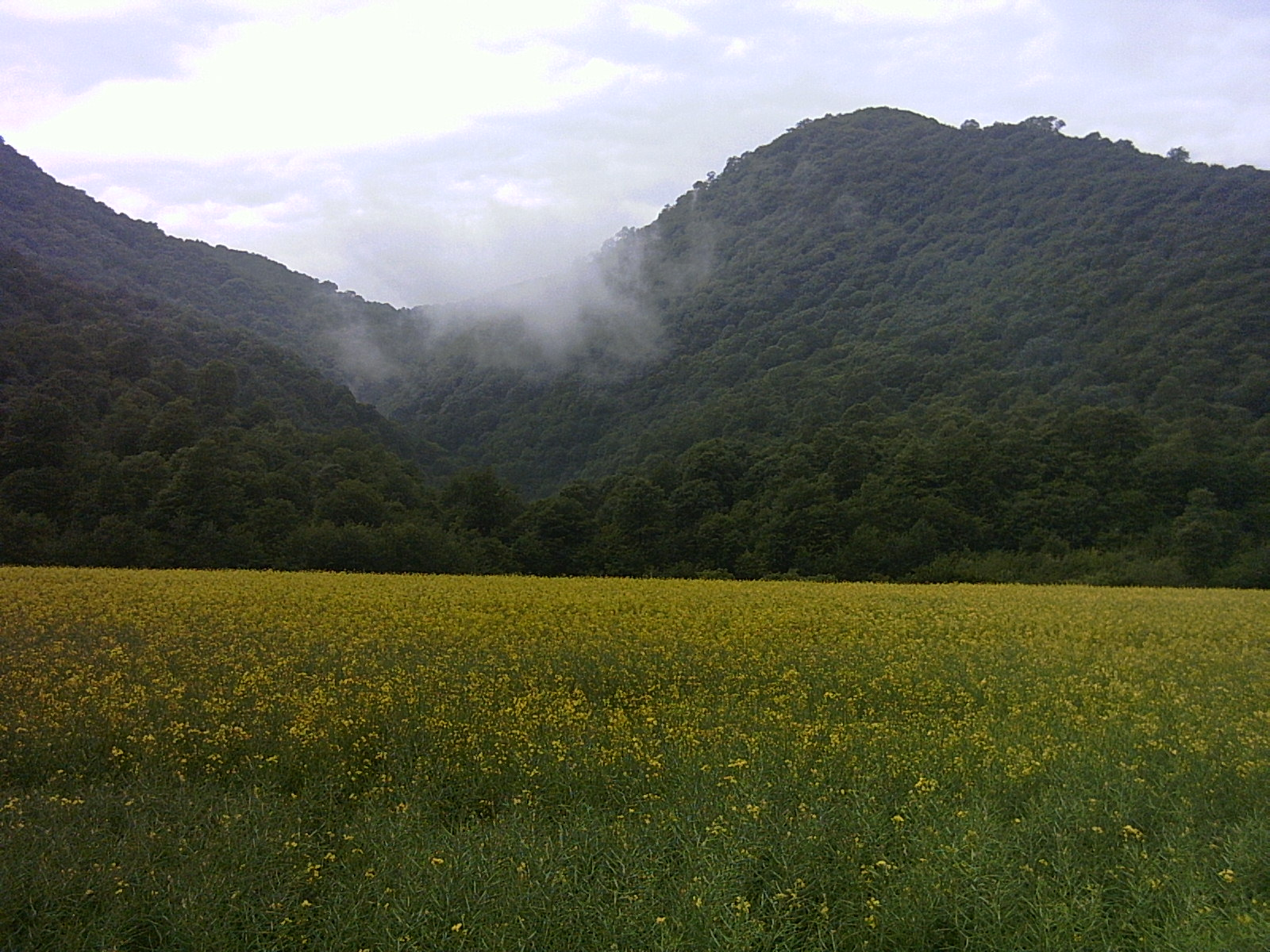
- Road from Fazelabad to the highlands of the rural district

- Location within Iran
- Coordinates: 36°46′N 54°49′E
- Country: Iran
- Province: Golestan
- County: Aliabad-e Katul
- District: Kamalan
- Established: 1987
- Capital: Fazelabad

Population (2016)
  - Total: 9,170
- Time zone: UTC+3:30 (IRST)

Estarabad Rural District (Persian: دهستان استرآباد) is in Kamalan District of Aliabad-e Katul County, (Note: Formerly Aliabad County) Golestan province, Iran. It is administered from the city of Fazelabad.

== Demographics ==
=== Population ===
At the time of the 2006 National Census, the rural district's population was 9,320 in 2,391 households. There were 9,820 inhabitants in 3,022 households at the following census of 2011. The 2016 census measured the population of the rural district as 9,170 in 2,896 households. The most populous of its 20 villages was Rahmatabad, with 4,324 people.

=== Other villages in the rural district ===
- Abbasabad
- Alaman
- Alestan
- Barfatan
- Cheli-ye Olya
- Cheli-ye Sofla
- Ganu
- Mahian
- Mohammadabad
- Nersu
- Rig Cheshmeh

== Gallery ==
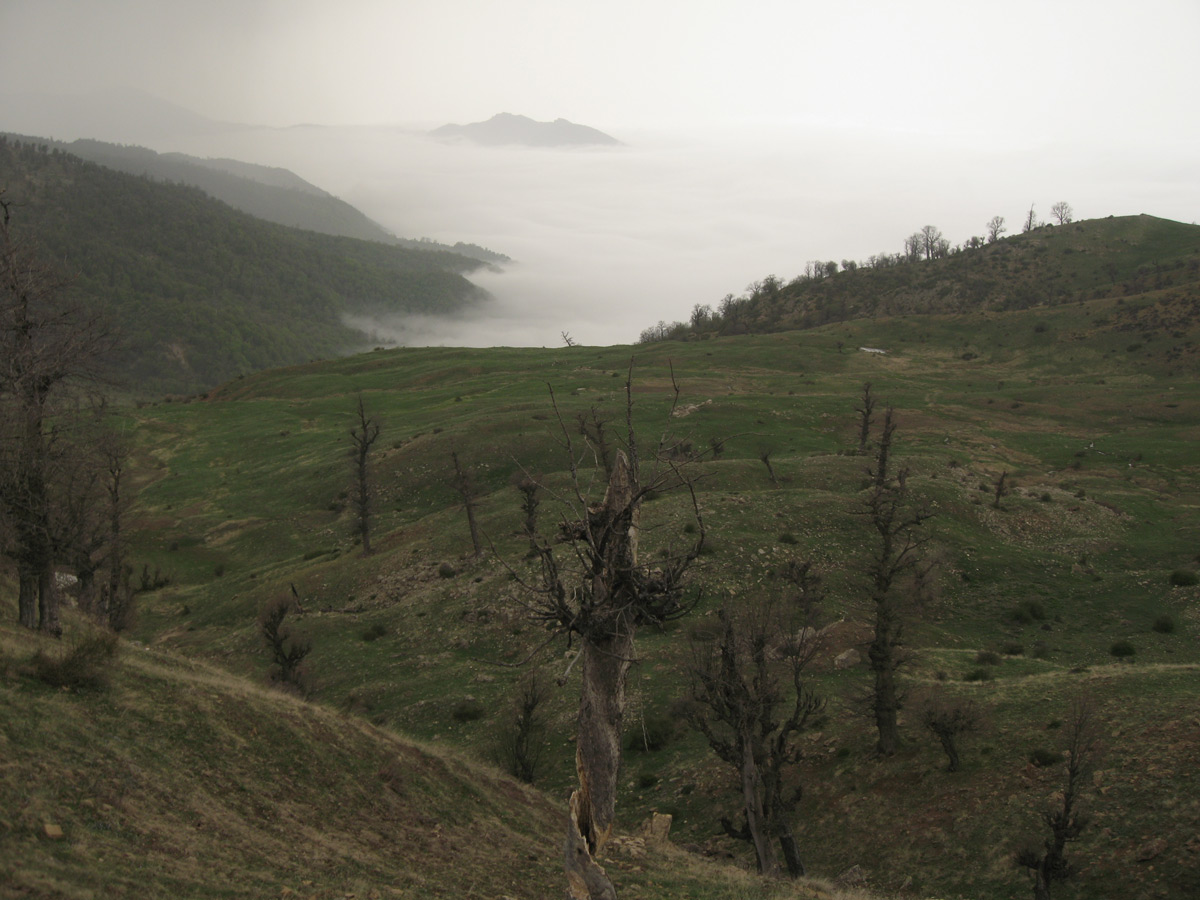

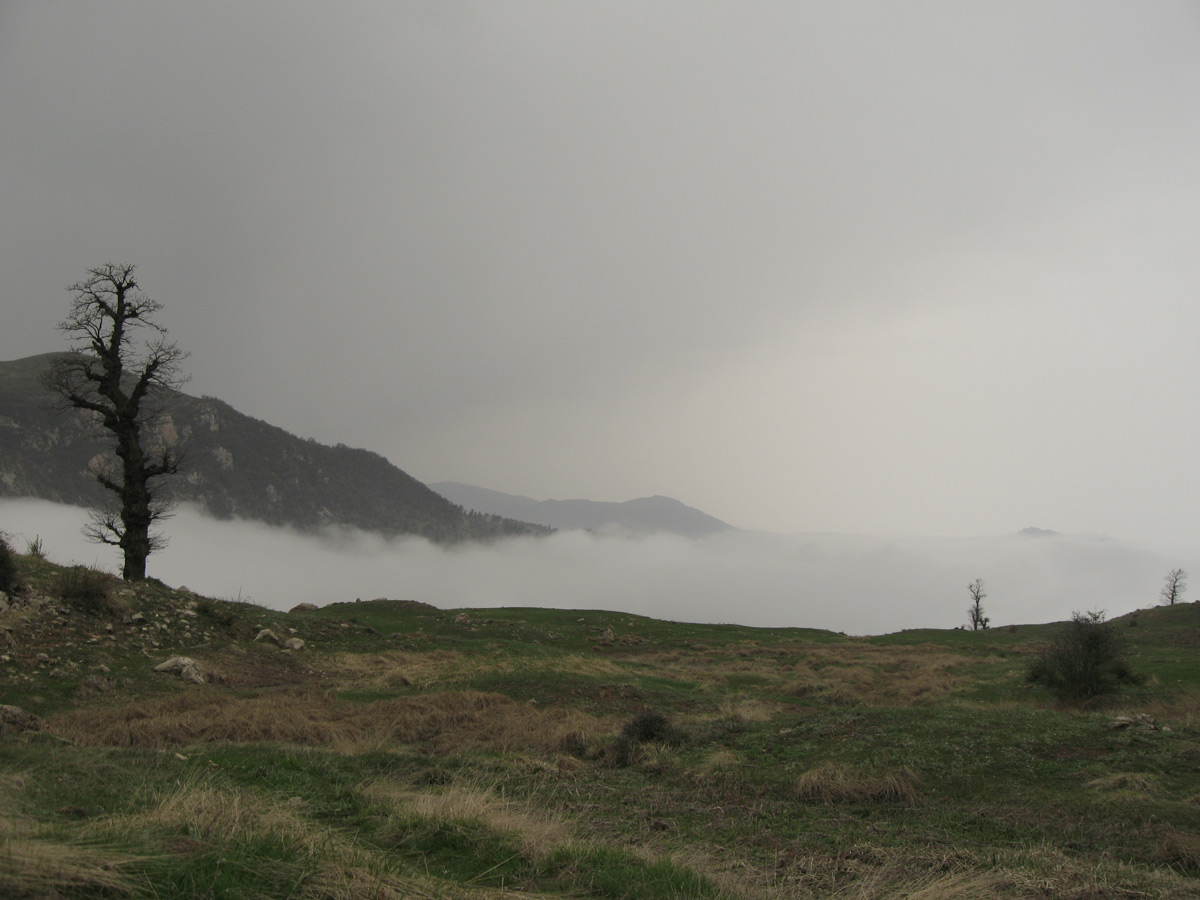

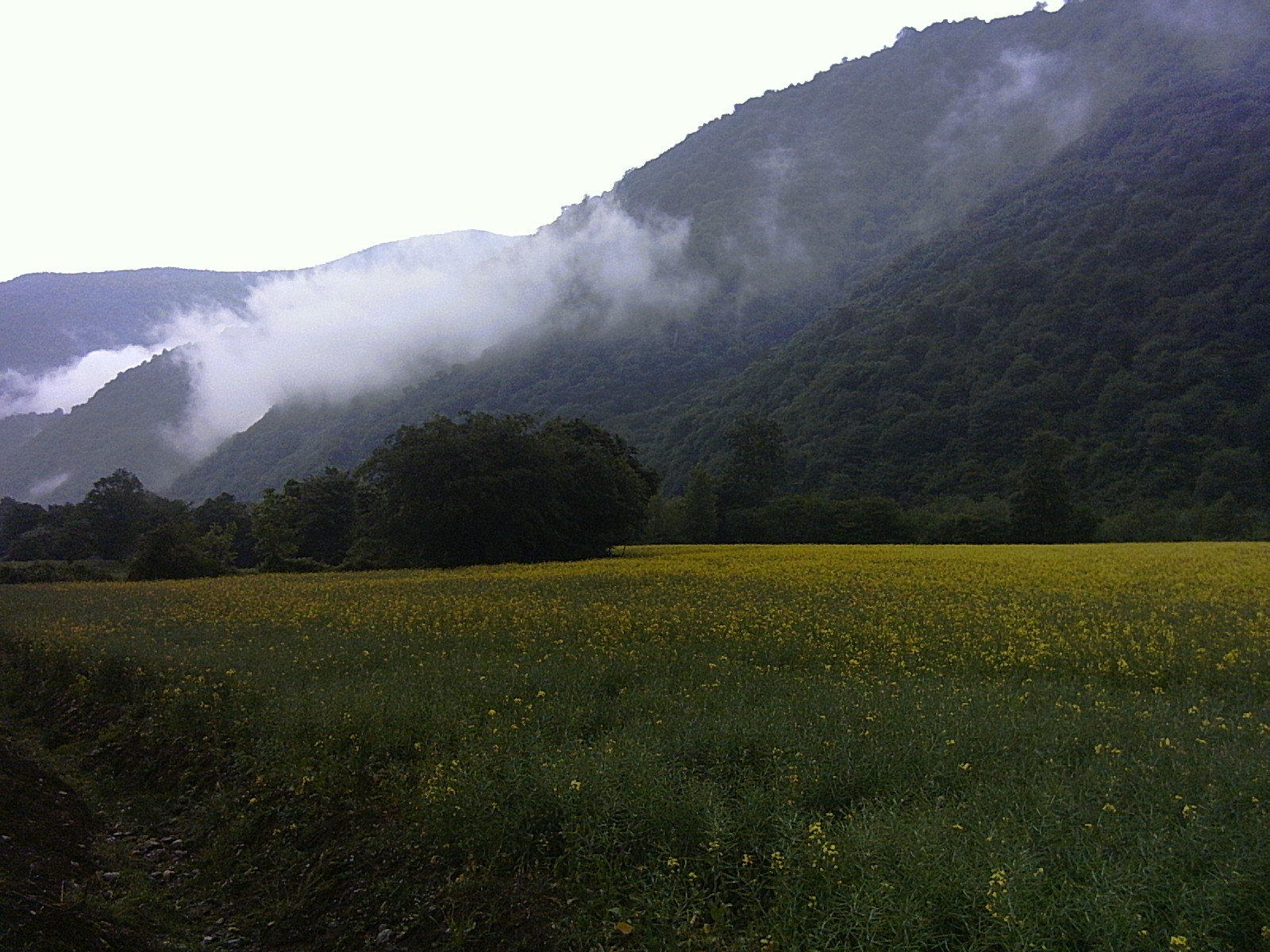
