= Khatamabad, Kermanshah =

Khatamabad خاتم اباد
- Village
- Location within Iran
- Coordinates: 34°54′00″N 47°45′00″E
- Country: Iran
- Province: Kermanshah
- County: Sonqor
- Bakhsh: Central
- Rural District: Bavaleh

Population (2006)
  - Total: 214
- Time zone: UTC+3:30 (IRST)
  - Summer (DST): UTC+4:30 (IRDT)

Khatamabad (Persian: خاتم اباد, also Romanized as Khātamābād) is a village in Bavaleh Rural District, in the Central District of Sonqor County, Kermanshah Province, Iran. According to the 2006 census, its population was 214, in 47 families.
