= Kamalan District =

District in Golestan province, Iran

Kamalan District Persian: بخش کمالان
- District
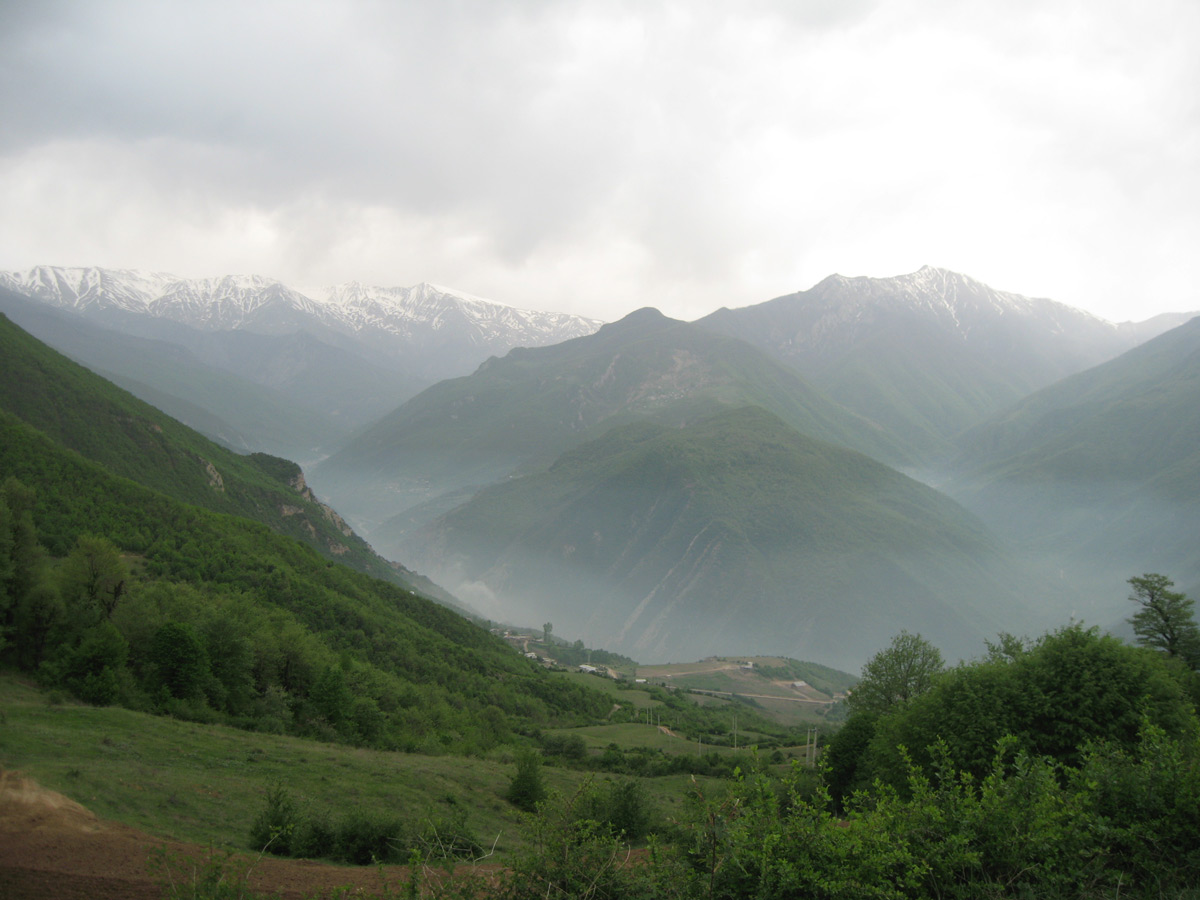
- Shahvar and Chelcheli Mountains in Estarabad Rural District

- Location within Iran
- Coordinates: 36°51′N 54°48′E
- Country: Iran
- Province: Golestan
- County: Aliabad-e Katul
- Established: 2000
- Capital: Fazelabad

Population (2016)
  - Total: 42,751
- Time zone: UTC+3:30 (IRST)

Kamalan District (Persian: بخش کمالان) is in Aliabad-e Katul County, (Note: Formerly Aliabad County) Golestan province, Iran. Its capital is the city of Fazelabad.

== Demographics ==
=== Population ===
At the time of the 2006 National Census, the district's population was 34,719 in 8,312 households. The following census in 2011 counted 37,295 people in 10,648 households. The 2016 census measured the population of the district as 42,751 inhabitants in 12,664 households.

=== Administrative divisions ===
Kamalan District Population
Administrative Divisions	2006	2011	2016
Estarabad RD	9,320	9,820	9,170
Shirang RD	12,339	12,927	14,120
Fazelabad (city)	13,060	14,548	19,461
Total	34,719	37,295	42,751
RD = Rural District
