= Central District (Aliabad-e Katul County) =

District in Golestan province, Iran

Central District (Aliabad-e Katul County) Persian: بخش مرکزی شهرستان علی‌آباد کتول
- District
- Location within Iran
- Coordinates: 36°54′N 54°56′E
- Country: Iran
- Province: Golestan
- County: Aliabad-e Katul
- Capital: Aliabad-e Katul

Population (2016)
  - Total: 97,957
- Time zone: UTC+3:30 (IRST)

The Central District of Aliabad-e Katul County (Note: Formerly Aliabad County) (Persian: بخش مرکزی شهرستان علی‌آباد کتول) is in Golestan province, Iran. Its capital is the city of Aliabad-e Katul.

== History ==
In 2013, the villages of Mazraeh and Sangdevin were converted to cities.

== Demographics ==
=== Population ===
At the time of the 2006 census, the district's population was 89,204 in 21,632 households. The following census in 2011 counted 95,462 people in 27,211 households. The 2016 census measured the population of the district as 97,957 inhabitants in 30,060 households.

=== Administrative divisions ===
Central District (Aliabad-e Katul County) Population
Administrative Divisions	2006	2011	2016
Katul RD	33,729	35,873	26,732
Zarrin Gol RD	9,292	9,785	10,175
Aliabad-e Katul (city)	46,183	49,804	52,838
Mazraeh (city) (Note: Became a city after the 2016 census)			4,009
Sangdevin (city) (Note: Became a city after the 2016 census)			4,203
Total	89,204	95,462	97,957
RD = Rural District
