= Aliabad-e Katul County =

County in Golestan province, Iran

Aliabad-e Katul County Persian: شهرستان علی‌آباد کتول
- County
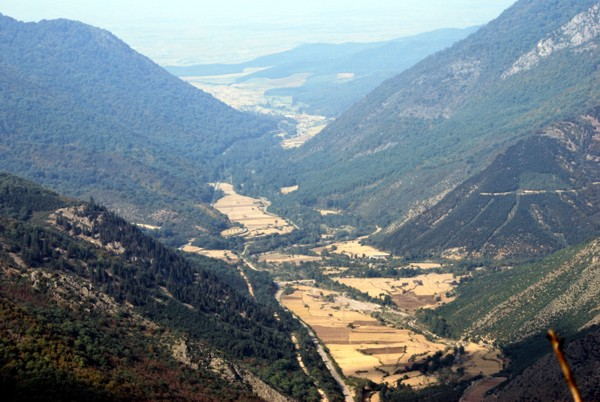
- Aliabad-e Katul, capital of Aliabad-e Katul County

- Location of Aliabad-e Katul County in Golestan province (center, pink)

- Location of Golestan province in Iran
- Coordinates: 36°51′N 54°54′E
- Country: Iran
- Province: Golestan
- Capital: Aliabad-e Katul
- Districts: Central, Kamalan

Population (2016)
  - Total: 140,709
- Time zone: UTC+3:30 (IRST)

Aliabad-e Katul County (Persian: شهرستان علی‌آباد کتول) (Note: Formerly Aliabad County (شهرستان علی‌آباد)) is in Golestan province, Iran. Its capital is the city of Aliabad-e Katul.

== History ==
In 2013, the villages of Mazraeh and Sangdevin were converted to cities. The name of the county changed from Aliabad to Aliabad-e Katul in 2020.

== Demographics ==
=== Population ===
At the time of the 2006 census, the county's population was 123,923 in 29,944 households. The following census in 2011 counted 132,757 people in 37,827 households. The 2016 census measured the population of the county as 140,709 in 42,725 households.

=== Administrative divisions ===
Aliabad-e Katul County's population history and administrative structure over three consecutive censuses are shown in the following table.

Aliabad-e Katul County Population
Administrative Divisions	2006	2011	2016
Central District	89,204	95,462	97,957
Katul RD	33,729	35,873	26,732
Zarrin Gol RD	9,292	9,785	10,175
Aliabad-e Katul (city)	46,183	49,804	52,838
Mazraeh (city) (Note: Became a city after the 2016 census)			4,009
Sangdevin (city) (Note: Became a city after the 2016 census)			4,203
Kamalan District	34,719	37,295	42,751
Estarabad RD	9,320	9,820	9,170
Shirang RD	12,339	12,927	14,120
Fazelabad (city)	13,060	14,548	19,461
Total	123,923	132,757	140,709
RD = Rural District

== See also ==
Media related to Aliabad County at Wikimedia Commons
