= Road 73 (Iran) =

Road in Iran

Road 73
- جاده 73

Route information
- Part of AH70
- Length: 75 km (47 mi)

Major junctions
- From: Incheh Borun, Golestan; Turkmenistan
- Road 18
- To: Gorgan, Golestan; Road 22

Location
- Country: Iran
- Provinces: Golestan
- Major cities: Aq Qala, Golestan

Highway system
- Highways in Iran; Freeways

Road 73 is a road in Golestan Province of northern Iran. It connects the Turkmenistan border crossing to Aq Qala and Gorgan in Golestan Province.

This road is part of Asian Highway, signed AH70.

== Route ==
From North to South
Incheh Borun Customs
	Ashk Tappeh; Towards Incheh Borun railway station
	Alma Gol Lake
	Tangeli; Towards Road 83 - Incheh Borun - Gonbad Kavoos - Maraveh Tappeh
	Golestan Petrochemical Company; Petrochemical Railway Station
	Gomishan
	Alman Road; Towards Anbar Olum - Gonbad Kavoos
	Saqar Tappeh
Aq Qala
	Imam Khomeini Street; Towards Aq Qala - City Center
	Aq Qabr
	Beheshti Street; Towards Aq Qala - City Center
Life Square	Maraveh Tappeh-Mahmudabad Expressway; East to Namaz Boulevard - Gonbad Kavoos - Maraveh Tappeh; West to Bandar Torkaman - Bandar Gaz - Amirabad Port
Aq Qala
	Police Boulevard; Towards Aq Qala - City Center
	Aq Qala Industrial Park
	Hajji Qareh
	Qorbanabad
	Gorgan International Airport
	Golestan International Exhibition
	Mohammadabad
	Amirabad
	Gorgan Northern Bypass Expressway; East to Sarkhon Kalateh - Azadshahr - Bojnourd - Mashhad; West to Kordkuy - Sari - Tehran
Gorgan; Municipal District 2
Astarabad Boulevard
	Karimabad; Towards Gorgan Martyrs Stadium Sky Moon Hypermarket
	Golestan Town Gorgan Passenger Terminal
Astarabad Boulevard
Qandehari Square	Sarakhs-Khalkhal Expressway; East to Solimani Expressway - Bojnourd - Mashhad; West to Kalantari Expressway - Sari - Tehran - Rasht - Gorgan Railway Station
Continues as: Imamzadeh Abdullah Street
From South to North

== See also ==
- Transportation in Golestan Province
- Asian Highway Network routes
- Iran–Turkmenistan border
