= Kalleh Post =

Village in Golestan province, Iran

Kalleh Post Persian: كله پست
- Village
- Location within Iran
- Coordinates: 37°08′30″N 54°13′16″E
- Country: Iran
- Province: Golestan
- County: Gomishan
- District: Central
- Rural District: Neftelijeh

Population (2016)
  - Total: 710
- Time zone: UTC+3:30 (IRST)

Kalleh Post (Persian: كله پست) (Note: Also known as Kalleh Posht) is a village in Neftelijeh Rural District of the Central District in Gomishan County, Golestan province, Iran.

== Demographics ==
=== Population ===
At the time of the 2006 National Census, the village's population was 479 in 105 households, when it was in Jafarbay-ye Sharqi Rural District of the former Gomishan District in Torkaman County. The following census in 2011 counted 664 people in 159 households, by which time the district had been separated from the county in the establishment of Gomishan County. The rural district was transferred to the new Goldasht District, and Kalleh Post was transferred to Neftelijeh Rural District created in the new Central District. The 2016 census measured the population of the village as 710 people in 196 households.
