= Qaleh Jiq-e Kuchek =

Village in Golestan province, Iran

Qaleh Jiq-e Kuchek Persian: قلعه جيق كوچك
- Village
- Location within Iran
- Coordinates: 37°07′14″N 54°10′38″E
- Country: Iran
- Province: Golestan
- County: Gomishan
- District: Central
- Rural District: Neftelijeh

Population (2016)
  - Total: 86
- Time zone: UTC+3:30 (IRST)

Qaleh Jiq-e Kuchek (Persian: قلعه جيق كوچك) (Note: Also romanized as Qal‘eh Jīq-e Kūchek and Qal‘eh-ye Jīq Kūchek; also known as Qal‘eh Chīq Kūḩek and Qal‘eh Jīn-e Kūchek) is a village in Neftelijeh Rural District of the Central District in Gomishan County, Golestan province, Iran.

== Demographics ==
=== Population ===
At the time of the 2006 National Census, the village's population was 87 in 15 households, when it was in Jafarbay-ye Sharqi Rural District of the former Gomishan District in Torkaman County. The following census in 2011 counted 102 people in 25 households, by which time the district had been separated from the county in the establishment of Gomishan County. The rural district was transferred to the new Goldasht District, and Qaleh Jiq-e Kuchek was transferred to Neftelijeh Rural District created in the new Central District. The 2016 census measured the population of the village as 86 people in 21 households.
