= Qolmas =

Village in Golestan province, Iran

Qolmas Persian: قلمس
- Village
- Location within Iran
- Coordinates: 37°07′34″N 54°14′50″E
- Country: Iran
- Province: Golestan
- County: Gomishan
- District: Central
- Rural District: Neftelijeh

Population (2016)
  - Total: 383
- Time zone: UTC+3:30 (IRST)

Qolmas (Persian: قلمس) is a village in Neftelijeh Rural District of the Central District in Gomishan County, Golestan province, Iran.

== Demographics ==
=== Population ===
At the time of the 2006 National Census, the village's population was 268 in 50 households, when it was in Jafarbay-ye Sharqi Rural District of the former Gomishan District in Torkaman County. The following census in 2011 counted 340 people in 75 households, by which time the district had been separated from the county in the establishment of Gomishan County. The rural district was transferred to the new Goldasht District, and Qolmas was transferred to Neftelijeh Rural District created in the new Central District. The 2016 census measured the population of the village as 383 people in 99 households.
