= Kamlar, Golestan =

Village in Golestan province, Iran

Kamlar Persian: كملر
- Village
- Location within Iran
- Coordinates: 37°00′03″N 54°08′45″E
- Country: Iran
- Province: Golestan
- County: Gomishan
- District: Goldasht
- Rural District: Jafarbay-ye Sharqi

Population (2016)
  - Total: 975
- Time zone: UTC+3:30 (IRST)

Kamlar (Persian: كملر) (Note: Also known as Kaşlar) is a village in Jafarbay-ye Sharqi Rural District of Goldasht District in Gomishan County, Golestan province, Iran.

== Demographics ==
=== Population ===
At the time of the 2006 National Census, the village's population was 787 in 152 households, when it was in Jafarbay-ye Gharbi Rural District of the former Gomishan District in Torkaman County. The following census in 2011 counted 907 people in 193 households, by which time the district had been separated from the county in the establishment of Gomishan County. The rural district was transferred to the new Central District, and Kamlar was transferred to Jafarbay-ye Sharqi Rural District in the new Goldasht District. The 2016 census measured the population of the village as 975 people in 248 households.
