= Qaleh Jiq-e Bozorg =

Village in Golestan province, Iran

Qaleh Jiq-e Bozorg Persian: قلعه جيق بزرگ
- Village
- Location within Iran
- Coordinates: 37°08′39″N 54°11′27″E
- Country: Iran
- Province: Golestan
- County: Gomishan
- District: Central
- Rural District: Neftelijeh

Population (2016)
  - Total: 1,374
- Time zone: UTC+3:30 (IRST)

Qaleh Jiq-e Bozorg (Persian: قلعه جيق بزرگ) (Note: Also romanized as Qal‘eh Jīq-e Bozorg and Qal‘eh-ye Jīq Bozorg; also known as Qal‘eh Chīq Bozorg, Qal‘eh Jīn-e Bozorg, and Qal’eh Jīq-e-Bālā) is a village in, and the capital of, Neftelijeh Rural District in the Central District of Gomishan County, Golestan province, Iran.

== Demographics ==
=== Population ===
At the time of the 2006 National Census, the village's population was 1,111 in 233 households, when it was in Jafarbay-ye Sharqi Rural District of the former Gomishan District in Torkaman County. The following census in 2011 counted 1,274 people in 297 households, by which time the district had been separated from the county in the establishment of Gomishan County. The rural district was transferred to the new Goldasht District, and Qaleh Jiq-e Bozorg was transferred to Neftelijeh Rural District created in the new Central District. The 2016 census measured the population of the village as 1,374 people in 370 households. It was the most populous village in its rural district.
