= Qaleh-ye Gomesh Dafeh =

Village in Golestan province, Iran

Qaleh-ye Gomesh Dafeh Persian: قلعه گمش دفه
- Village
- Location within Iran
- Coordinates: 36°59′02″N 54°17′46″E
- Country: Iran
- Province: Golestan
- County: Gomishan
- District: Goldasht
- Rural District: Qezel Alan

Population (2016)
  - Total: 535
- Time zone: UTC+3:30 (IRST)

Qaleh-ye Gomesh Dafeh (Persian: قلعه گمش دفه) (Note: Also romanized as Qal‘eh-ye Gomesh Dafeh; also known as Gīsh Dafeh) is a village in Qezel Alan Rural District of Goldasht District in Gomishan County, Golestan province, Iran.

== Demographics ==
=== Population ===
At the time of the 2006 National Census, the village's population was 404 in 74 households, when it was in Jafarbay-ye Sharqi Rural District of the former Gomishan District in Torkaman County. The following census in 2011 counted 456 people in 110 households, by which time the district had been separated from the county in the establishment of Gomishan County. The rural district was transferred to the new Goldasht District, and Qaleh-ye Gomesh Dafeh was transferred to Qezel Alan Rural District created in the same district. The 2016 census measured the population of the village as 535 people in 153 households.
