= Safa Ishan =

Village in Golestan province, Iran

Safa Ishan Persian: صفاايشان
- Village
- Location within Iran
- Coordinates: 37°05′35″N 54°04′10″E
- Country: Iran
- Province: Golestan
- County: Gomishan
- District: Central
- Rural District: Neftelijeh

Population (2016)
  - Total: 449
- Time zone: UTC+3:30 (IRST)

Safa Ishan (Persian: صفاايشان) (Note: Also romanized as Şafā Īshān) is a village in Neftelijeh Rural District of the Central District in Gomishan County, Golestan province, Iran.

== Demographics ==
=== Population ===
At the time of the 2006 National Census, the village's population was 389 in 77 households, when it was in Jafarbay-ye Gharbi Rural District of the former Gomishan District in Torkaman County. The following census in 2011 counted 462 people in 108 households, by which time the district had been separated from the county in the establishment of Gomishan County. The rural district was transferred to the new Central District, and Safa Ishan was transferred to Neftelijeh Rural District created in the same district. The 2016 census measured the population of the village as 449 people in 118 households.
