= Altin Tokhmaq =

Village in Golestan province, Iran

Altin Tokhmaq Persian: التين تخماق
- Village
- Location within Iran
- Coordinates: 37°07′44″N 54°16′17″E
- Country: Iran
- Province: Golestan
- County: Gomishan
- District: Central
- Rural District: Neftelijeh

Population (2016)
  - Total: 697
- Time zone: UTC+3:30 (IRST)

Altin Tokhmaq (Persian: التين تخماق) (Note: Also romanized as Āltīn Tokhmāq; also known as Ālbatan Tokhmāq) is a village in Neftelijeh Rural District of the Central District in Gomishan County, Golestan province, Iran.

== Demographics ==
=== Population ===
At the time of the 2006 National Census, the village's population was 553 in 113 households, when it was in Jafarbay-ye Sharqi Rural District of the former Gomishan District in Torkaman County. The following census in 2011 counted 647 people in 152 households, by which time the district had been separated from the county in the establishment of Gomishan County. The rural district was transferred to the new Goldasht District, and Altin Tokhmaq was transferred to Neftelijeh Rural District created in the new Central District. The 2016 census measured the population of the village as 697 people in 200 households.
