= Basirabad, Golestan =

Village in Golestan province, Iran

Basirabad Persian: بصيراباد
- Village
- Location within Iran
- Coordinates: 37°00′43″N 54°09′44″E
- Country: Iran
- Province: Golestan
- County: Gomishan
- District: Goldasht
- Rural District: Jafarbay-ye Sharqi

Population (2016)
  - Total: 3,259
- Time zone: UTC+3:30 (IRST)

Basirabad (Persian: بصيراباد) (Note: Also romanized as Başīrābād and Basīrabād; also known as Başrābād) is a village in, and the capital of, Jafarbay-ye Sharqi Rural District in Goldasht District of Gomishan County, Golestan province, Iran. The previous capital of the rural district was the village of Bonavar until it merged with two other villages to form the city of Siminshahr, which became the administrative center for the rural district.

== Demographics ==
=== Population ===
At the time of the 2006 National Census, the village's population was 2,638 in 522 households, when it was in Jafarbay-ye Gharbi Rural District of the former Gomishan District in Torkaman County. The following census in 2011 counted 2,963 people in 650 households, by which time the district had been separated from the county in the establishment of Gomishan County. The rural district was transferred to the new Central District, and Basirabad was transferred to Jafarbay-ye Sharqi Rural District in the new Goldasht District. The 2016 census measured the population of the village as 3,259 people in 828 households. It was the most populous village in its rural district.
