= Nardaneli =

Village in Golestan province, Iran

Nardaneli Persian: ناردانلی
- Village
- Location within Iran
- Coordinates: 37°03′38″N 54°08′18″E
- Country: Iran
- Province: Golestan
- County: Gomishan
- District: Central
- Rural District: Neftelijeh

Population (2016)
  - Total: 29
- Time zone: UTC+3:30 (IRST)

Nardaneli (Persian: ناردانلی) is a village in Neftelijeh Rural District of the Central District in Gomishan County, Golestan province, Iran.

== Demographics ==
=== Population ===
At the time of the 2006 National Census, the village's population was below the reporting threshold, when it was in Jafarbay-ye Gharbi Rural District of the former Gomishan District in Torkaman County. The following census in 2011 counted five people in five households, by which time the district had been separated from the county in the establishment of Gomishan County. The rural district was transferred to the new Central District, and Nardaneli was transferred to Neftelijeh Rural District created in the same district. The 2016 census measured the population of the village as 29 people in seven households.
