= Qaleh-ye Hajji Galdi Khan =

Village in Golestan province, Iran

Qaleh-ye Hajji Galdi Khan Persian: قلعه حاجي گلدي خان
- Village
- Location within Iran
- Coordinates: 36°58′52″N 54°17′36″E
- Country: Iran
- Province: Golestan
- County: Gomishan
- District: Goldasht
- Rural District: Qezel Alan

Population (2016)
  - Total: 461
- Time zone: UTC+3:30 (IRST)

Qaleh-ye Hajji Galdi Khan (Persian: قلعه حاجي گلدي خان) (Note: Also romanized as Qal‘eh-ye Ḩājjī Galdī Khān) is a village in Qezel Alan Rural District of Goldasht District in Gomishan County, Golestan province, Iran.

== Demographics ==
=== Population ===
At the time of the 2006 National Census, the village's population was 411 in 86 households, when it was in Jafarbay-ye Sharqi Rural District of the former Gomishan District in Torkaman County. The following census in 2011 counted 439 people in 99 households, by which time the district had been separated from the county in the establishment of Gomishan County. The rural district was transferred to the new Goldasht District, and Qaleh-ye Hajji Galdi Khan was transferred to Qezel Alan Rural District created in the same district. The 2016 census measured the population of the village as 461 people in 132 households.
