= Qaranjik-e Gukcheli =

Village in Golestan province, Iran

Qaranjik-e Gukcheli Persian: قرنجيك گوكچلي
- Village
- Location within Iran
- Coordinates: 36°58′45″N 54°20′12″E
- Country: Iran
- Province: Golestan
- County: Gomishan
- District: Goldasht
- Rural District: Qezel Alan

Population (2016)
  - Total: 637
- Time zone: UTC+3:30 (IRST)

Qaranjik-e Gukcheli (Persian: قرنجيك گوكچلي) (Note: Also romanized as Qaranjīk-e Gūgchelī; also known as Qaranjīk-e Gūgjelī) is a village in Qezel Alan Rural District of Goldasht District in Gomishan County, Golestan province, Iran.

== Demographics ==
=== Population ===
At the time of the 2006 National Census, the village's population was 510 in 108 households, when it was in Jafarbay-ye Sharqi Rural District of the former Gomishan District in Torkaman County. The following census in 2011 counted 593 people in 137 households, by which time the district had been separated from the county in the establishment of Gomishan County. The rural district was transferred to the new Goldasht District, and Qaranjik-e Gukcheli was transferred to Qezel Alan Rural District created in the same district. The 2016 census measured the population of the village as 637 people in 180 households.
