= Kowslar =

Village in Golestan province, Iran

Kowslar Persian: كوسلر
- Village
- Location within Iran
- Coordinates: 37°00′16″N 54°14′36″E
- Country: Iran
- Province: Golestan
- County: Gomishan
- District: Goldasht
- Rural District: Jafarbay-ye Sharqi

Population (2016)
  - Total: 266
- Time zone: UTC+3:30 (IRST)

Kowslar (Persian: كوسلر) (Note: Also romanized as Kows̄lar and Kūs̄lar) is a village in Jafarbay-ye Sharqi Rural District of Goldasht District in Gomishan County, Golestan province, Iran.

== Demographics ==
=== Population ===
At the time of the 2006 National Census, the village's population was 228 in 45 households, when it was in the former Gomishan District of Torkaman County. The following census in 2011 counted 235 people in 56 households, by which time the district had been separated from the county in the establishment of Gomishan County. The rural district was transferred to the new Goldasht District. The 2016 census measured the population of the village as 266 people in 64 households.
