= Bahalkeh =

Bahalkeh or Behelkeh (Persian: بهلكه) may refer to:

- Bahalkeh-ye Bahram Akhund
- Bahalkeh-ye Dashli
- Bahalkeh-ye Nafas
- Bahalkeh-ye Sheykh Musa
