= Qaleh-ye Qarah Jalar =

Village in Golestan province, Iran

Qaleh-ye Qarah Jalar Persian: قلعه قره جلر
- Village
- Location within Iran
- Coordinates: 36°58′50″N 54°18′03″E
- Country: Iran
- Province: Golestan
- County: Gomishan
- District: Goldasht
- Rural District: Qezel Alan

Population (2016)
  - Total: 314
- Time zone: UTC+3:30 (IRST)

Qaleh-ye Qarah Jalar (Persian: قلعه قره جلر) (Note: Also romanized as Qal‘eh-ye Qarah Jalar; also known as Qarah Jelow and Qareh Jalar) is a village in Qezel Alan Rural District of Goldasht District in Gomishan County, Golestan province, Iran.

== Demographics ==
=== Population ===
At the time of the 2006 National Census, the village's population was 237 in 59 households, when it was in Jafarbay-ye Sharqi Rural District of the former Gomishan District in Torkaman County. The following census in 2011 counted 277 people in 71 households, by which time the district had been separated from the county in the establishment of Gomishan County. The rural district was transferred to the new Goldasht District, and Qaleh-ye Qarah Jalar was transferred to Qezel Alan Rural District created in the same district. The 2016 census measured the population of the village as 314 people in 86 households.
