= Jafarbay =

Jafarbay (Persian: جعفربائ) may refer to:

- Jafarbay, Golestan
- Jafarbay-ye Gharbi Rural District
- Jafarbay-ye Jonubi Rural District
- Jafarbay-ye Sharqi Rural District
