= Dahaneh, Golestan =

Village in Golestan province, Iran

Dahaneh Persian: دهنه
- Village
- Location within Iran
- Coordinates: 36°59′22″N 54°03′49″E
- Country: Iran
- Province: Golestan
- County: Gomishan
- District: Central
- Rural District: Jafarbay-ye Gharbi

Population (2016)
  - Total: 1,401
- Time zone: UTC+3:30 (IRST)

Dahaneh (Persian: دهنه) (Note: Also known as Dahaneh-ye Yek) is a village in Jafarbay-ye Gharbi Rural District of the Central District in Gomishan County, Golestan province, Iran.

== Demographics ==
=== Population ===
At the time of the 2006 National Census, the village's population was 1,197 in 221 households, when it was in the former Gomishan District of Torkaman County. The following census in 2011 counted 1,418 people in 296 households, by which time the district had been separated from the county in the establishment of Gomishan County. The rural district was transferred to the new Central District. The 2016 census measured the population of the village as 1,401 people in 384 households.
