= Moradberdi =

Village in Golestan province, Iran

Moradberdi Persian: مرادبردي
- Village
- Location within Iran
- Coordinates: 36°59′44″N 54°15′34″E
- Country: Iran
- Province: Golestan
- County: Gomishan
- District: Goldasht
- Rural District: Jafarbay-ye Sharqi

Population (2016)
  - Total: 223
- Time zone: UTC+3:30 (IRST)

Moradberdi (Persian: مرادبردي) (Note: Also romanized as Morādberdī) is a village in Jafarbay-ye Sharqi Rural District of Goldasht District in Gomishan County, Golestan province, Iran.

== Demographics ==
=== Population ===
At the time of the 2006 National Census, the village's population was 203 in 42 households, when it was in the former Gomishan District of Torkaman County. The following census in 2011 counted 227 people in 53 households, by which time the district had been separated from the county in the establishment of Gomishan County. The rural district was transferred to the new Goldasht District. The 2016 census measured the population of the village as 223 people in 62 households.
