= Tumachlar =

Tumachlar (Persian: توماچلار or توماچلر) may refer to:

- Tumachlar, Jafarbay-ye Gharbi
- Tumachlar, Jafarbay-ye Sharqi
- Tumachlar-e Altin
