= Qaranjik =

Qaranjik (Persian: قرنجيك) may refer to:

- Qaranjik-e Gukcheli
- Qaranjik-e Khavjeh Khan
- Qaranjik-e Pur Aman
