= Arkh-e Bozorg =

Village in Golestan province, Iran

Arkh-e Bozorg Persian: ارخ بزرگ
- Village
- Location within Iran
- Coordinates: 36°58′51″N 54°16′38″E
- Country: Iran
- Province: Golestan
- County: Gomishan
- District: Goldasht
- Rural District: Qezel Alan

Population (2016)
  - Total: 3,128
- Time zone: UTC+3:30 (IRST)

Arkh-e Bozorg (Persian: ارخ بزرگ) is a village in, and the capital of, Qezel Alan Rural District in Goldasht District of Gomishan County, Golestan province, Iran.

== Demographics ==
=== Population ===
At the time of the 2006 National Census, the village's population was 2,494 in 474 households, when it was in Jafarbay-ye Sharqi Rural District of the former Gomishan District in Torkaman County. The following census in 2011 counted 2,840 people in 665 households, by which time the district had been separated from the county in the establishment of Gomishan County. The rural district was transferred to the new Goldasht District, and Arkh-e Bozorg was transferred to Qezel Alan Rural District created in the same district. The 2016 census measured the population of the village as 3,128 people in 833 households.
