= Qaranjik-e Khvajeh Khan =

Village in Golestan province, Iran

Qaranjik-e Khvajeh Khan Persian: قرنجيك خواجه خان
- Village
- Location within Iran
- Coordinates: 36°58′37″N 54°19′27″E
- Country: Iran
- Province: Golestan
- County: Gomishan
- District: Goldasht
- Rural District: Qezel Alan

Population (2016)
  - Total: 3,414
- Time zone: UTC+3:30 (IRST)

Qaranjik-e Khvajeh Khan (Persian: قرنجيك خواجه خان) (Note: Also romanized as Qaranjīk-e Khvājeh Khān; also known as Qaranjīk) is a village in Qezel Alan Rural District of Goldasht District in Gomishan County, Golestan province, Iran.

== Demographics ==
=== Population ===
At the time of the 2006 National Census, the village's population was 2,574 in 542 households, when it was in Jafarbay-ye Sharqi Rural District of the former Gomishan District in Torkaman County. The following census in 2011 counted 3,193 people in 715 households, by which time the district had been separated from the county in the establishment of Gomishan County. The rural district was transferred to the new Goldasht District, and Qaranjik-e Khvajeh Khan was transferred to Qezel Alan Rural District created in the same district. The 2016 census measured the population of the village as 3,414 people in 965 households. It was the most populous village in its rural district.
