= Mohammad Aleq =

Village in Golestan province, Iran

Mohammad Aleq Persian: محمدآلق
- Village
- Location within Iran
- Coordinates: 37°00′44″N 54°28′38″E
- Country: Iran
- Province: Golestan
- County: Aqqala
- District: Central
- Rural District: Gorganbuy

Population (2016)
  - Total: 478
- Time zone: UTC+3:30 (IRST)

Mohammad Aleq (Persian: محمدآلق) (Note: Also romanized as Moḩammad Āleq; also known as Garkaz Maḩalleh) is a village in Gorganbuy Rural District of the Central District in Aqqala County, Golestan province, Iran. It is an eastern suburb of Aqqala city.

== Demographics ==
=== Population ===
At the time of the 2006 National Census, the village's population was 388 in 74 households. The following census in 2011 counted 430 people in 104 households. The 2016 census measured the population of the village as 478 people in 119 households.
