= Khaje Nafas =

Village in Golestan province, Iran

Khaje Nafas Persian: خواجه نفس
- Village
- Location within Iran
- Coordinates: 36°59′36″N 54°05′47″E
- Country: Iran
- Province: Golestan
- County: Gomishan
- District: Central
- Rural District: Jafarbay-ye Gharbi

Population (2016)
  - Total: 5,129
- Time zone: UTC+3:30 (IRST)

Khaje Nafas (Persian: خواجه نفس) (Note: Also romanized as Khāje Nafas, Khājeh Nafas, Khvajeh Nafas, and Khvājeh Nafas) is a village in, and the capital of, Jafarbay-ye Gharbi Rural District in the Central District of Gomishan County, Golestan province, Iran.

== Demographics ==
=== Population ===
At the time of the 2006 National Census, the village's population was 4,390 in 892 households, when it was in the former Gomishan District of Torkaman County. The following census in 2011 counted 5,120 people in 1,208 households, by which time the district had been separated from the county in the establishment of Gomishan County. The rural district was transferred to the new Central District. The 2016 census measured the population of the village as 5,129 people in 1,429 households. It was the most populous village in its rural district.
