= Karim Ishan, Gomishan =

Village in Golestan province, Iran

Karim Ishan Persian: كريم ايشان
- Village
- Location within Iran
- Coordinates: 36°59′05″N 54°18′17″E
- Country: Iran
- Province: Golestan
- County: Gomishan
- District: Goldasht
- Rural District: Qezel Alan

Population (2016)
  - Total: 985
- Time zone: UTC+3:30 (IRST)

Karim Ishan (Persian: كريم ايشان) (Note: Also romanized as Karīm Īshān) is a village in Qezel Alan Rural District of Goldasht District in Gomishan County, Golestan province, Iran.

== Demographics ==
=== Population ===
At the time of the 2006 National Census, the village's population was 759 in 155 households, when it was in Jafarbay-ye Sharqi Rural District of the former Gomishan District in Torkaman County. The following census in 2011 counted 875 people in 183 households, by which time the district had been separated from the county in the establishment of Gomishan County. The rural district was transferred to the new Goldasht District, and Karim Ishan was transferred to Qezel Alan Rural District created in the same district. The 2016 census measured the population of the village as 985 people in 289 households.
