= Qarah Kileh =

Village in Golestan province, Iran

Qarah Kileh Persian: قره كيله
- Village
- Location within Iran
- Coordinates: 37°00′22″N 54°06′00″E
- Country: Iran
- Province: Golestan
- County: Gomishan
- District: Central
- Rural District: Jafarbay-ye Gharbi

Population (2016)
  - Total: 1,024
- Time zone: UTC+3:30 (IRST)

Qarah Kileh (Persian: قره كيله) (Note: Also romanized as Qarah Kīleh and Qareh Kīleh) is a village in Jafarbay-ye Gharbi Rural District of the Central District in Gomishan County, Golestan province, Iran.

== Demographics ==
=== Population ===
At the time of the 2006 National Census, the village's population was 851 in 147 households, when it was in the former Gomishan District of Torkaman County. The following census in 2011 counted 983 people in 228 households, by which time the district had been separated from the county in the establishment of Gomishan County. The rural district was transferred to the new Central District. The 2016 census measured the population of the village as 1,024 people in 289 households.
