= Qarmaseh =

Village in Golestan province, Iran

Qarmaseh Persian: قرمسه
- Village
- Location within Iran
- Coordinates: 36°59′43″N 54°04′08″E
- Country: Iran
- Province: Golestan
- County: Gomishan
- District: Central
- Rural District: Jafarbay-ye Gharbi

Population (2016)
  - Total: 325
- Time zone: UTC+3:30 (IRST)

Qarmaseh (Persian: قرمسه) is a village in Jafarbay-ye Gharbi Rural District of the Central District in Gomishan County, Golestan province, Iran.

== Demographics ==
=== Population ===
At the time of the 2006 National Census, the village's population was 239 in 48 households, when it was in the former Gomishan District of Torkaman County. The following census in 2011 counted 283 people in 66 households, by which time the district had been separated from the county in the establishment of Gomishan County. The rural district was transferred to the new Central District. The 2016 census measured the population of the village as 325 people in 89 households.
