= Tumachlar, Qezel Alan =

Village in Golestan province, Iran

Tumachlar Persian: توماچلر
- Village
- Location within Iran
- Coordinates: 36°58′45″N 54°17′13″E
- Country: Iran
- Province: Golestan
- County: Gomishan
- District: Goldasht
- Rural District: Qezel Alan

Population (2016)
  - Total: 737
- Time zone: UTC+3:30 (IRST)

Tumachlar (Persian: توماچلر) (Note: Also romanized as Tūmāchlar; also known as Tūmāchār) is a village in Qezel Alan Rural District of Goldasht District in Gomishan County, Golestan province, Iran.

== Demographics ==
=== Population ===
At the time of the 2006 National Census, the village's population was 601 in 123 households, when it was in Jafarbay-ye Sharqi Rural District of the former Gomishan District in Torkaman County. The following census in 2011 counted 675 people in 164 households, by which time the district had been separated from the county in the establishment of Gomishan County. The rural district was transferred to the new Goldasht District, and Tumachlar was transferred to Qezel Alan Rural District created in the same district. The 2016 census measured the population of the village as 737 people in 199 households.
