= Qasemabad-e Yolmeh Salian =

Village in Golestan province, Iran

Qasemabad-e Yolmeh Salian Persian: قاسم آباد يلمه ساليان
- Village
- Location within Iran
- Coordinates: 37.182°N 54.724°E
- Country: Iran
- Province: Golestan
- County: Aqqala
- District: Voshmgir
- Rural District: Mazraeh-ye Shomali

Population (2016)
  - Total: 422
- Time zone: UTC+3:30 (IRST)

Qasemabad-e Yolmeh Salian (Persian: قاسم آباد يلمه ساليان) (Note: Also romanized as Qāsemābād-e Yolmeh Sālīān) is a village in Mazraeh-ye Shomali Rural District (Note: Formerly Mazraeh Rural District) of Voshmgir District in Aqqala County, Golestan province, Iran. It is just west of Yolmeh Salian village.

== Demographics ==
=== Population ===
At the time of the 2006 National Census, the village's population was 425 in 94 households. The following census in 2011 counted 419 people in 115 households. The 2016 census measured the population of the village as 422 people in 118 households.
