= Khivali =

Village in Golestan province, Iran

Khivali Persian: خيولی
- Village
- Location within Iran
- Coordinates: 37°04′19″N 54°42′21″E
- Country: Iran
- Province: Golestan
- County: Aqqala
- District: Central
- Rural District: Sheykh Musa

Population (2016)
  - Total: 1,234
- Time zone: UTC+3:30 (IRST)

Khivali (Persian: خيولی) (Note: Also romanized as Khīvalī; also known as Ḩīvalī and Khīvahlī) is a village in Sheykh Musa Rural District of the Central District in Aqqala County, Golestan province, Iran.

== Demographics ==
=== Population ===
At the time of the 2006 National Census, the village's population was 959 in 197 households. The following census in 2011 counted 1,113 people in 290 households. The 2016 census measured the population of the village as 1,234 people in 321 households.
