= Nasarkan-e Sofla =

Village in Golestan province, Iran

Nasarkan-e Sofla Persian: نصركان سفلی
- Village
- Location within Iran
- Coordinates: 36°59′25″N 54°40′33″E
- Country: Iran
- Province: Golestan
- County: Aqqala
- District: Central
- Rural District: Aq Altin

Population (2016)
  - Total: 67
- Time zone: UTC+3:30 (IRST)

Nasarkan-e Sofla (Persian: نصركان سفلی) (Note: Also romanized as Naşarkān-e Soflá) is a village in Aq Altin Rural District of the Central District in Aqqala County, Golestan province, Iran.

== Demographics ==
=== Population ===
At the time of the 2006 National Census, the village's population was 92 in 18 households. The following census in 2011 counted 97 people in 27 households. The 2016 census measured the population of the village as 67 people in 18 households.
