= Do Gunchi =

Village in Golestan province, Iran

Do Gunchi Persian: دوگونچی
- Village
- Location within Iran
- Coordinates: 37°00′04″N 54°25′04″E
- Country: Iran
- Province: Golestan
- County: Aqqala
- District: Central
- Rural District: Gorganbuy

Population (2016)
  - Total: 2,704
- Time zone: UTC+3:30 (IRST)

Do Gunchi (Persian: دوگونچی) (Note: Also romanized as Do Gūnchī; also known as Do Gonjī) is a village in Gorganbuy Rural District of the Central District in Aqqala County, Golestan province, Iran.

== Demographics ==
=== Population ===
At the time of the 2006 National Census, the village's population was 2,112 in 453 households. The following census in 2011 counted 2,513 people in 634 households. The 2016 census measured the population of the village as 2,704 people in 692 households.
