= Sazeman-e Heydari =

Village in Golestan province, Iran

Sazeman-e Heydari Persian: سازمان حيدرئ
- Village
- Location within Iran
- Coordinates: 37°05′18″N 54°41′43″E
- Country: Iran
- Province: Golestan
- County: Aqqala
- District: Central
- Rural District: Sheykh Musa

Population (2016)
  - Total: 161
- Time zone: UTC+3:30 (IRST)

Sazeman-e Heydari (Persian: سازمان حيدرئ) (Note: Also romanized as Sāzemān-e Ḩeydari) is a village in Sheykh Musa Rural District of the Central District in Aqqala County, Golestan province, Iran.

== Demographics ==
=== Population ===
At the time of the 2006 National Census, the village's population was 117 in 27 households. The following census in 2011 counted 159 people in 41 households. The 2016 census measured the population of the village as 161 people in 38 households.
