= Qareh Jelu =

Qareh Jelu or Qarah Jelu or Qarah Jelow (Persian: قره جلو) may refer to:

- Qarah Jelu, East Azerbaijan Province
- Qarah Jelow, Golestan
- Qareh Jelu, Kurdistan
