= Yampi =

Village in Golestan province, Iran

Yampi Persian: یامپی
- Village
- Location within Iran
- Coordinates: 36°56′14″N 54°23′04″E
- Country: Iran
- Province: Golestan
- County: Aqqala
- District: Central
- Rural District: Gorganbuy

Population (2016)
  - Total: 2,822
- Time zone: UTC+3:30 (IRST)

Yampi (Persian: یامپی) (Note: Also romanized as Yāmpī; also known as Yāmchī) is a village in Gorganbuy Rural District of the Central District in Aqqala County, Golestan province, Iran.

== Demographics ==
=== Population ===
At the time of the 2006 National Census, the village's population was 2,291 in 519 households. The following census in 2011 counted 2,516 people in 687 households. The 2016 census measured the population of the village as 2,822 people in 767 households.
