= Chin Suli =

Village in Golestan province, Iran

Chin Suli Persian: چين سولی
- Village
- Location within Iran
- Coordinates: 37°05′28″N 54°36′54″E
- Country: Iran
- Province: Golestan
- County: Aqqala
- District: Voshmgir
- Rural District: Mazraeh-ye Jonubi

Population (2016)
  - Total: 4,254
- Time zone: UTC+3:30 (IRST)

Chin Suli (Persian: چين سولی) (Note: Also romanized as Chīn Sūlī; formerly known as Chin Sebili (چين سبيلي), also romanized as Chīn Sabīlī and Chīn Sebīlī; also known as Chen Sebblī, Chīn Sebablī, and Chīn Sīblī) is a village in, and the capital of, Mazraeh-ye Jonubi Rural District in Voshmgir District of Aqqala County, Golestan province, Iran.

== Demographics ==
=== Population ===
At the time of the 2006 National Census, the village's population, as Chin Sebili, was 3,336 in 767 households. The following census in 2011 counted 3,863 people in 1,039 households, by which time the village was listed as Chin Suli. The 2016 census measured the population of the village as 4,254 people in 1,219 households. It was the most populous village in its rural district.
