= Salaq Yelqi =

Village in Golestan province, Iran

Salaq Yelqi Persian: سلاق يلقی
- Village
- Location within Iran
- Coordinates: 37°01′36″N 54°31′52″E
- Country: Iran
- Province: Golestan
- County: Aqqala
- District: Central
- Rural District: Gorganbuy

Population (2016)
  - Total: 1,442
- Time zone: UTC+3:30 (IRST)

Salaq Yelqi (Persian: سلاق يلقی) (Note: Also romanized as Salāq Yelqī and Salāq Yolqī; also known as Yelqī) is a village in Gorganbuy Rural District of the Central District in Aqqala County, Golestan province, Iran.

== Demographics ==
=== Population ===
At the time of the 2006 National Census, the village's population was 1,218 in 253 households. The following census in 2011 counted 1,395 people in 338 households. The 2016 census measured the population of the village as 1,442 people in 379 households.
