= Geri Doveji =

Village in Golestan province, Iran

Geri Doveji Persian: گری دوجی
- Village
- Location within Iran
- Coordinates: 37°04′45″N 54°43′37″E
- Country: Iran
- Province: Golestan
- County: Aqqala
- District: Central
- Rural District: Sheykh Musa

Population (2016)
  - Total: 2,826
- Time zone: UTC+3:30 (IRST)

Geri Doveji (Persian: گری دوجی) (Note: Also romanized as Gerī Dovejī; also known as Gerī) is a village in, and the capital of, Sheykh Musa Rural District in the Central District of Aqqala County, Golestan province, Iran.

== Demographics ==
=== Population ===
At the time of the 2006 National Census, the village's population was 2,331 in 451 households. The following census in 2011 counted 2,739 people in 636 households. The 2016 census measured the population of the village as 2,826 people in 753 households. It was the most populous village in its rural district.
