= Badraq-e Molla =

Village in Golestan province, Iran

Badraq-e Molla Persian: بدراق ملا
- Village
- Location within Iran
- Coordinates: 37°04′53″N 54°49′25″E
- Country: Iran
- Province: Golestan
- County: Aqqala
- District: Central
- Rural District: Sheykh Musa

Population (2016)
  - Total: 1,337
- Time zone: UTC+3:30 (IRST)

Badraq-e Molla (Persian: بدراق ملا) (Note: Also romanized as Badrāq-e Mollā) is a village in Sheykh Musa Rural District of the Central District in Aqqala County, Golestan province, Iran.

== Demographics ==
=== Population ===
At the time of the 2006 National Census, the village's population was 1,020 in 199 households. The following census in 2011 counted 1,190 people in 301 households. The 2016 census measured the population of the village as 1,337 people in 352 households.
