= Nosratabad, Aqqala =

Village in Golestan province, Iran

Nosratabad Persian: نصرت آباد
- Village
- Location within Iran
- Coordinates: 37°06′56″N 54°47′45″E
- Country: Iran
- Province: Golestan
- County: Aqqala
- District: Central
- Rural District: Sheykh Musa

Population (2016)
  - Total: 866
- Time zone: UTC+3:30 (IRST)

Nosratabad (Persian: نصرت آباد) (Note: Also romanized as Noşratābād) is a village in Sheykh Musa Rural District of the Central District in Aqqala County, Golestan province, Iran.

== Demographics ==
=== Population ===
At the time of the 2006 National Census, the village's population was 794 in 168 households. The following census in 2011 counted 814 people in 256 households. The 2016 census measured the population of the village as 866 people in 266 households.
