= Aq Zabir =

Village in Golestan province, Iran

Aq Zabir Persian: آق زبير
- Village
- Location within Iran
- Coordinates: 37°04′22″N 54°33′59″E
- Country: Iran
- Province: Golestan
- County: Aqqala
- District: Central
- Rural District: Gorganbuy

Population (2016)
  - Total: 1,061
- Time zone: UTC+3:30 (IRST)

Aq Zabir (Persian: آقزبير) (Note: Also romanized as Āq Zabīr and Eqzebīr; also known as Āq Zīr) is a village in Gorganbuy Rural District of the Central District in Aqqala County, Golestan province, Iran.

== Demographics ==
=== Population ===
At the time of the 2006 National Census, the village's population was 789 in 173 households. The following census in 2011 counted 988 people in 290 households. The 2016 census measured the population of the village as 1,061 people in 319 households.
