= Abbasabad, Aqqala =

Village in Golestan province, Iran

Abbasabad Persian: عباس آباد
- Village
- Location within Iran
- Coordinates: 37°12′12″N 54°44′41″E
- Country: Iran
- Province: Golestan
- County: Aqqala
- District: Voshmgir
- Rural District: Mazraeh-ye Shomali

Population (2016)
  - Total: 468
- Time zone: UTC+3:30 (IRST)

Abbasabad (Persian: عباس اباد) (Note: Also romanized as ‘Abbāsābād) is a village in Mazraeh-ye Shomali Rural District (Note: Formerly Mazraeh Rural District) of Voshmgir District in Aqqala County, Golestan province, Iran.

== Demographics ==
=== Population ===
At the time of the 2006 National Census, the village's population was 434 in 92 households. The following census in 2011 counted 425 people in 112 households. The 2016 census measured the population of the village as 468 people in 141 households.
