= Sheykhabad-e Yolmeh Salian =

Village in Golestan province, Iran

Sheykhabad-e Yolmeh Salian Persian: شيخ آباديلمه ساليان
- Village
- Location within Iran
- Coordinates: 37°11′52″N 54°44′30″E
- Country: Iran
- Province: Golestan
- County: Aqqala
- District: Voshmgir
- Rural District: Mazraeh-ye Shomali

Population (2016)
  - Total: 177
- Time zone: UTC+3:30 (IRST)

Sheykhabad-e Yolmeh Salian (Persian: شيخ اباديلمه ساليان) (Note: Also romanized as Sheykhābād-e Yolmeh Sālīān; also known as Sheykhābād) is a village in Mazraeh-ye Shomali Rural District (Note: Formerly Mazraeh Rural District) of Voshmgir District in Aqqala County, Golestan province, Iran.

== Demographics ==
=== Population ===
At the time of the 2006 National Census, the village's population was 203 in 44 households. The following census in 2011 counted 201 people in 60 households. The 2016 census measured the population of the village as 177 people in 49 households.
