= Sahneh-ye Sofla =

Village in Golestan province, Iran

Sahneh-ye Sofla Persian: صحنه سفلی
- Village
- Location within Iran
- Coordinates: 36°59′24″N 54°23′05″E
- Country: Iran
- Province: Golestan
- County: Aqqala
- District: Central
- Rural District: Gorganbuy

Population (2016)
  - Total: 3,676
- Time zone: UTC+3:30 (IRST)

Sahneh-ye Sofla (Persian: صحنه سفلی) (Note: Also romanized as Şaḩneh-ye Soflá; also known as Şaḩneh-ye Pā’īn) is a village in Gorganbuy Rural District of the Central District in Aqqala County, Golestan province, Iran.

== Demographics ==
=== Population ===
At the time of the 2006 National Census, the village's population was 2,958 in 610 households. The following census in 2011 counted 3,460 people in 877 households. The 2016 census measured the population of the village as 3,676 people in 1,030 households. It was the most populous village in its rural district.
