= Qushjanabad =

Village in Golestan province, Iran

Qushjanabad Persian: قوشجان آباد
- Village
- Location within Iran
- Coordinates: 36°58′11″N 54°32′57″E
- Country: Iran
- Province: Golestan
- County: Aqqala
- District: Central
- Rural District: Gorganbuy

Population (2016)
  - Total: 1,013
- Time zone: UTC+3:30 (IRST)

Qushjanabad (Persian: قوشجان آباد) (Note: Also romanized as Qūshjānābād; also known as Qūshchālābād) is a village in Gorganbuy Rural District of the Central District in Aqqala County, Golestan province, Iran.

== Demographics ==
=== Population ===
At the time of the 2006 National Census, the village's population was 1,019 in 218 households. The following census in 2011 counted 1,078 people in 267 households. The 2016 census measured the population of the village as 1,013 people in 300 households.
