= Ataabad, Aqqala =

Village in Golestan province, Iran

Ataabad Persian: عطاآباد
- Village
- Location within Iran
- Coordinates: 36°58′50″N 54°37′10″E
- Country: Iran
- Province: Golestan
- County: Aqqala
- District: Central
- Rural District: Aq Altin

Population (2016)
  - Total: 5,333
- Time zone: UTC+3:30 (IRST)

Ataabad (Persian: عطاآباد) (Note: Also romanized as ‘Aţāābād; also known as Gāvzan-e Torkaman) is a village in, and the capital of, Aq Altin Rural District in the Central District of Aqqala County, Golestan province, Iran.

== Demographics ==
=== Population ===
At the time of the 2006 National Census, the village's population was 4,526 in 943 households. The following census in 2011 counted 5,081 people in 1,333 households. The 2016 census measured the population of the village as 5,333 people in 1,451 households. It was the most populous village in its rural district.
