= Piravash =

Piravash and Piravosh (Persian: پيرواش) may refer to:

- Piravash-e Olya
- Piravash-e Sofla
