= Qaleh Jiq, Golestan =

Village in Golestan province, Iran

Qaleh Jiq Persian: قلعه جيق
- Village
- Location within Iran
- Coordinates: 36°57′52″N 54°30′43″E
- Country: Iran
- Province: Golestan
- County: Aqqala
- District: Central
- Rural District: Gorganbuy

Population (2016)
  - Total: 1,566
- Time zone: UTC+3:30 (IRST)

Qaleh Jiq (Persian: قلعه جيق) (Note: Also romanized as Qal‘eh Jīq; also known as Qal‘eh Jīq-e Moḩammad Āleq) is a village in Gorganbuy Rural District of the Central District in Aqqala County, Golestan province, Iran.

== Demographics ==
=== Population ===
At the time of the 2006 National Census, the village's population was 1,249 in 253 households. The following census in 2011 counted 1,465 people in 366 households. The 2016 census measured the population of the village as 1,566 people in 398 households.
