= Aminabad, Golestan =

Village in Golestan province, Iran

Aminabad Persian: امين آباد
- Village
- Location within Iran
- Coordinates: 37°13′49″N 54°45′25″E
- Country: Iran
- Province: Golestan
- County: Aqqala
- District: Voshmgir
- Rural District: Mazraeh-ye Shomali

Population (2016)
  - Total: 1,255
- Time zone: UTC+3:30 (IRST)

Aminabad (Persian: امين آباد) (Note: Also romanized as Amīnābād) is a village in Mazraeh-ye Shomali Rural District (Note: Formerly Mazraeh Rural District) of Voshmgir District in Aqqala County, Golestan province, Iran.

== Demographics ==
=== Population ===
At the time of the 2006 National Census, the village's population was 1,329 in 284 households. The following census in 2011 counted 1,396 people in 359 households. The 2016 census measured the population of the village as 1,255 people in 338 households.
