= Saqar Yelqi =

Village in Golestan province, Iran

Saqar Yelqi Persian: سقريلقی
- Village
- Location within Iran
- Coordinates: 37°00′45″N 54°31′14″E
- Country: Iran
- Province: Golestan
- County: Aqqala
- District: Central
- Rural District: Gorganbuy

Population (2016)
  - Total: 1,132
- Time zone: UTC+3:30 (IRST)

Saqar Yelqi (Persian: سقريلقی) (Note: Also romanized as Saqar Yelqī) is a village in Gorganbuy Rural District of the Central District in Aqqala County, Golestan province, Iran.

== Demographics ==
=== Population ===
At the time of the 2006 National Census, the village's population was 989 in 184 households. The following census in 2011 counted 1,032 people in 249 households. The 2016 census measured the population of the village as 1,132 people in 296 households.
