= Mohammadabad-e Bala =

Village in Golestan province, Iran

Mohammadabad-e Bala Persian: محمدآباد بالا
- Village
- Location within Iran
- Coordinates: 37°13′27″N 54°40′29″E
- Country: Iran
- Province: Golestan
- County: Aqqala
- District: Voshmgir
- Rural District: Mazraeh-ye Shomali

Population (2016)
  - Total: 1,108
- Time zone: UTC+3:30 (IRST)

Mohammadabad-e Bala (Persian: محمدآباد بالا) (Note: Also romanized as Moḩammadābād-e Bālā) is a village in Mazraeh-ye Shomali Rural District (Note: Formerly Mazraeh Rural District) of Voshmgir District in Aqqala County, Golestan province, Iran.

== Demographics ==
=== Population ===
At the time of the 2006 National Census, the village's population was 1,219 in 208 households. The following census in 2011 counted 1,275 people in 284 households. The 2016 census measured the population of the village as 1,108 people in 276 households.
