= Tappeh-ye Zohurian =

Village in Golestan province, Iran

Tappeh-ye Zohurian Persian: تپه ظهوريان
- Village
- Location within Iran
- Coordinates: 37°05′49″N 54°49′56″E
- Country: Iran
- Province: Golestan
- County: Aqqala
- District: Central
- Rural District: Sheykh Musa

Population (2016)
  - Total: 235
- Time zone: UTC+3:30 (IRST)

Tappeh-ye Zohurian (Persian: تپه ظهوريان) (Note: Also romanized as Tappeh-ye Zohūrīān; also known as Tappeh-ye Zhohūrīyān) is a village in Sheykh Musa Rural District of the Central District in Aqqala County, Golestan province, Iran.

== Demographics ==
=== Population ===
At the time of the 2006 National Census, the village's population was 205 in 45 households. The following census in 2011 counted 186 people in 48 households. The 2016 census measured the population of the village as 235 people in 63 households.
