= Qarah Daghli =

Village in Golestan province, Iran

Qarah Daghli Persian: قره داغلی
- Village
- Location within Iran
- Coordinates: 37°03′27″N 54°46′42″E
- Country: Iran
- Province: Golestan
- County: Aqqala
- District: Central
- Rural District: Sheykh Musa

Population (2016)
  - Total: 1,153
- Time zone: UTC+3:30 (IRST)

Qarah Daghli (Persian: قره داغلی) (Note: Also romanized as Qarah Dāghlī and Qareh Dāghlī) is a village in Sheykh Musa Rural District of the Central District in Aqqala County, Golestan province, Iran.

== Demographics ==
=== Population ===
At the time of the 2006 National Census, the village's population was 1,007 in 221 households. The following census in 2011 counted 1,062 people in 277 households. The 2016 census measured the population of the village as 1,153 people in 301 households.
