= Aq Tekeh Khan =

Village in Golestan province, Iran

Aq Tekeh Khan Persian: آق تكه خان
- Village
- Location within Iran
- Coordinates: 37°00′15″N 54°26′19″E
- Country: Iran
- Province: Golestan
- County: Aqqala
- District: Central
- Rural District: Gorganbuy

Population (2006)
  - Total: 886
- Time zone: UTC+3:30 (IRST)

Aq Tekeh Khan (Persian: آق تكه خان) (Note: Also romanized as Āq Tekeh Khān) is a village in Gorganbuy Rural District of the Central District in Aqqala County, Golestan province, Iran.

== Demographics ==
=== Population ===
At the time of the 2006 National Census, the village's population was 886 in 176 households. The village did not appear in the following censuses of 2011 and 2016.
