= Sheykh Tappeh =

Village in Golestan province, Iran

Sheykh Tappeh Persian: شيخ تپه
- Village
- Location within Iran
- Coordinates: 36°58′52″N 54°35′36″E
- Country: Iran
- Province: Golestan
- County: Aqqala
- District: Central
- Rural District: Aq Altin

Population (2016)
  - Total: 458
- Time zone: UTC+3:30 (IRST)

Sheykh Tappeh (Persian: شيخ تپه) is a village in Aq Altin Rural District of the Central District in Aqqala County, Golestan province, Iran.

== Demographics ==
=== Population ===
At the time of the 2006 National Census, the village's population was 393 in 80 households. The following census in 2011 counted 437 people in 109 households. The 2016 census measured the population of the village as 458 people in 128 households.
