= Uch Tappeh, Golestan =

Village in Golestan province, Iran

Uch Tappeh Persian: اوچ تپه
- Village
- Location within Iran
- Coordinates: 37°02′52″N 54°40′28″E
- Country: Iran
- Province: Golestan
- County: Aqqala
- District: Central
- Rural District: Sheykh Musa

Population (2016)
  - Total: 1,885
- Time zone: UTC+3:30 (IRST)

Uch Tappeh (Persian: اوچ تپه) (Note: Also romanized as Ūch Tappeh) is a village in Sheykh Musa Rural District of the Central District in Aqqala County, Golestan province, Iran.

== Demographics ==
=== Population ===
At the time of the 2006 National Census, the village's population was 1,510 in 326 households. The following census in 2011 counted 1,751 people in 454 households. The 2016 census measured the population of the village as 1,885 people in 485 households.
