= Tumachlar-e Altin =

Village in Golestan province, Iran

Tumachlar-e Altin Persian: توماچلرالتين
- Village
- Location within Iran
- Coordinates: 37°05′34″N 54°18′34″E
- Country: Iran
- Province: Golestan
- County: Gomishan
- District: Goldasht
- Rural District: Jafarbay-ye Sharqi

Population (2016)
  - Total: 306
- Time zone: UTC+3:30 (IRST)

Tumachlar-e Altin (Persian: توماچلرالتين) (Note: Also romanized as Tūmāchlar-e Āltīn) is a village in Jafarbay-ye Sharqi Rural District of Goldasht District in Gomishan County, Golestan province, Iran.

== Demographics ==
=== Population ===
At the time of the 2006 National Census, the village's population was 212 in 41 households, when it was in the former Gomishan District of Torkaman County. The following census in 2011 counted 247 people in 57 households, by which time the district had been separated from the county in the establishment of Gomishan County. The rural district was transferred to the new Goldasht District. The 2016 census measured the population of the village as 306 people in 79 households.
