= Gug Tappeh-ye Do =

Village in Golestan province, Iran

Gug Tappeh-ye Do Persian: گُوگْ تَپّهِ دُو
- Village
- Location within Iran
- Coordinates: 37°11′28″N 54°43′58″E
- Country: Iran
- Province: Golestan
- County: Aqqala
- District: Voshmgir
- Rural District: Mazraeh-ye Shomali

Population (2016)
  - Total: 347
- Time zone: UTC+3:30 (IRST)

Gug Tappeh-ye Do (Persian: گُوگْ تَپّهِ دُو) (Note: Also romanized as Gūg Tappeh-ye Do) is a village in Mazraeh-ye Shomali Rural District (Note: Formerly Mazraeh Rural District) of Voshmgir District in Aqqala County, Golestan province, Iran.

== Demographics ==
=== Population ===
At the time of the 2006 National Census, the village's population was 392 in 81 households. The following census in 2011 counted 329 people in 91 households. The 2016 census measured the population of the village as 347 people in 110 households.
