= Tazehabad, Golestan =

Village in Golestan province, Iran

Tazehabad Persian: تازه آباد
- Village
- Location within Iran
- Coordinates: 37°5′34″N 54°35′37″E
- Country: Iran
- Province: Golestan
- County: Aqqala
- District: Voshmgir
- Rural District: Mazraeh-ye Jonubi

Population (2016)
  - Total: 375
- Time zone: UTC+3:30 (IRST)

Tazehabad (Persian: تازه اباد) (Note: Also romanized as Tāzehābād) is a village in Mazraeh-ye Jonubi Rural District of Voshmgir District in Aqqala County, Golestan province, Iran.

== Demographics ==
=== Population ===
At the time of the 2006 National Census, the village's population was 309 in 75 households. The following census in 2011 counted 387 people in 110 households. The 2016 census measured the population of the village as 375 people in 107 households.
