= Seyyedlar, Golestan =

Village in Golestan province, Iran

Seyyedlar Persian: سيدلر
- Village
- Location within Iran
- Coordinates: 37°03′24″N 54°33′00″E
- Country: Iran
- Province: Golestan
- County: Aqqala
- District: Central
- Rural District: Gorganbuy

Population (2016)
  - Total: 462
- Time zone: UTC+3:30 (IRST)

Seyyedlar (Persian: سيدلر) is a village in Gorganbuy Rural District of the Central District in Aqqala County, Golestan province, Iran.

== Demographics ==
=== Population ===
At the time of the 2006 National Census, the village's population was 385 in 77 households. The following census in 2011 counted 435 people in 94 households. The 2016 census measured the population of the village as 462 people in 126 households.
