= Jamaran, Golestan =

Village in Golestan province, Iran

Jamaran Persian: جماران
- Village
- Location within Iran
- Coordinates: 37°06′51″N 54°49′20″E
- Country: Iran
- Province: Golestan
- County: Aqqala
- District: Central
- Rural District: Sheykh Musa

Population (2016)
  - Total: 743
- Time zone: UTC+3:30 (IRST)

Jamaran (Persian: جماران) (Note: Also romanized as Jamārān) is a village in Sheykh Musa Rural District of the Central District in Aqqala County, Golestan province, Iran.

== Demographics ==
=== Population ===
At the time of the 2006 National Census, the village's population was 695 in 141 households. The following census in 2011 counted 746 people in 205 households. The 2016 census measured the population of the village as 743 people in 202 households.
