= Anbar Tappeh, Golestan =

Village in Golestan province, Iran

Anbar Tappeh Persian: انبارتپه
- Village
- Location within Iran
- Coordinates: 36°58′11″N 54°37′24″E
- Country: Iran
- Province: Golestan
- County: Aqqala
- District: Central
- Rural District: Aq Altin

Population (2016)
  - Total: 754
- Time zone: UTC+3:30 (IRST)

Anbar Tappeh (Persian: انبارتپه) (Note: Also romanized as Anbār Tappeh) is a village in Aq Altin Rural District of the Central District in Aqqala County, Golestan province, Iran.

== Demographics ==
=== Population ===
At the time of the 2006 National Census, the village's population was 733 in 160 households. The following census in 2011 counted 762 people in 218 households. The 2016 census measured the population of the village as 754 people in 219 households.
