= Mohammadabad, Aqqala =

Village in Golestan province, Iran

Mohammadabad Persian: محمدآباد
- Village
- Location within Iran
- Coordinates: 36°57′52″N 54°34′13″E
- Country: Iran
- Province: Golestan
- County: Aqqala
- District: Central
- Rural District: Gorganbuy

Population (2016)
  - Total: 256
- Time zone: UTC+3:30 (IRST)

Mohammadabad (Persian: محمدآباد) (Note: Also romanized as Moḩammadābād) is a village in Gorganbuy Rural District of the Central District in Aqqala County, Golestan province, Iran.

== Demographics ==
=== Population ===
At the time of the 2006 National Census, the village's population was 261 in 72 households. The following census in 2011 counted 264 people in 82 households. The 2016 census measured the population of the village as 256 people in 79 households.
