= Habib Ishan =

Village in Golestan province, Iran

Habib Ishan Persian: حبيب ايشان
- Village
- Location within Iran
- Coordinates: 37°08′48″N 54°39′45″E
- Country: Iran
- Province: Golestan
- County: Aqqala
- District: Voshmgir
- Rural District: Mazraeh-ye Shomali

Population (2016)
  - Total: 979
- Time zone: UTC+3:30 (IRST)

Habib Ishan (Persian: حبيب ايشان) (Note: Also romanized as Ḩabīb Īshān) is a village in Mazraeh-ye Shomali Rural District (Note: Formerly Mazraeh Rural District) of Voshmgir District in Aqqala County, Golestan province, Iran.

== Demographics ==
=== Population ===
At the time of the 2006 National Census, the village's population was 847 in 203 households. The following census in 2011 counted 925 people in 217 households. The 2016 census measured the population of the village as 979 people in 245 households.
