= Mohammadabad-e Pain, Golestan =

Village in Golestan province, Iran

Mohammadabad-e Pain Persian: محمدآباد پائين
- Village
- Location within Iran
- Coordinates: 37°14′25″N 54°38′17″E
- Country: Iran
- Province: Golestan
- County: Aqqala
- District: Voshmgir
- Rural District: Mazraeh-ye Shomali

Population (2016)
  - Total: 513
- Time zone: UTC+3:30 (IRST)

Mohammadabad-e Pain (Persian: محمدآباد پائين) (Note: Also romanized as Moḩammadābād-e Pā’īn; also known as Moḩammadābād) is a village in Mazraeh-ye Shomali Rural District (Note: Formerly Mazraeh Rural District) of Voshmgir District in Aqqala County, Golestan province, Iran.

== Demographics ==
=== Population ===
At the time of the 2006 National Census, the village's population was 483 in 87 households. The following census in 2011 counted 492 people in 120 households. The 2016 census measured the population of the village as 513 people in 133 households.
