= Gamishli-ye Khvajeh Nafas =

Village in Golestan province, Iran

Gamishli-ye Khvajeh Nafas Persian: گاميشلي خواجه نفس
- Village
- Location within Iran
- Coordinates: 36°59′23″N 54°05′08″E
- Country: Iran
- Province: Golestan
- County: Gomishan
- District: Central
- Rural District: Jafarbay-ye Gharbi

Population (2016)
  - Total: 546
- Time zone: UTC+3:30 (IRST)

Gamishli-ye Khvajeh Nafas (Persian: گاميشلي خواجه نفس) (Note: Also romanized as Gāmīshlī-ye Khvājeh Nafas; also known as Dahaneh Khvājeh Nafas) is a village in Jafarbay-ye Gharbi Rural District of the Central District in Gomishan County, Golestan province, Iran.

== Demographics ==
=== Population ===
At the time of the 2006 National Census, the village's population was 444 in 87 households, when it was in the former Gomishan District of Torkaman County. The following census in 2011 counted 486 people in 127 households, by which time the district had been separated from the county in the establishment of Gomishan County. The rural district was transferred to the new Central District. The 2016 census measured the population of the village as 546 people in 161 households.
