= Delijeh =

Village in Golestan province, Iran

Delijeh Persian: دليجه
- Village
- Location within Iran
- Coordinates: 36°57′35″N 54°28′16″E
- Country: Iran
- Province: Golestan
- County: Aqqala
- District: Central
- Rural District: Gorganbuy

Population (2016)
  - Total: 1,123
- Time zone: UTC+3:30 (IRST)

Delijeh (Persian: دليجه) (Note: Also romanized as Delījeh) is a village in Gorganbuy Rural District of the Central District in Aqqala County, Golestan province, Iran.

== Demographics ==
=== Population ===
At the time of the 2006 National Census, the village's population was 919 in 170 households. The following census in 2011 counted 1,045 people in 257 households. The 2016 census measured the population of the village as 1,123 people in 283 households.
