= Qanqormeh =

Village in Golestan province, Iran

Qanqormeh Persian: قانقرمه
- Village
- Location within Iran
- Coordinates: 37°00′47″N 54°30′20″E
- Country: Iran
- Province: Golestan
- County: Aqqala
- District: Central
- Rural District: Gorganbuy

Population (2016)
  - Total: 2,197
- Time zone: UTC+3:30 (IRST)

Qanqormeh (Persian: قانقرمه) (Note: Also romanized as Qānqormeh) is a village in, and the capital of, Gorganbuy Rural District in the Central District of Aqqala County, Golestan province, Iran.

== Demographics ==
=== Population ===
At the time of the 2006 National Census, the village's population was 1,662 in 343 households. The following census in 2011 counted 2,021 people in 487 households. The 2016 census measured the population of the village as 2,197 people in 602 households.
