= Eslamabad-e Pain, Aqqala =

Village in Golestan province, Iran

Eslamabad-e Pain Persian: اسلام آباد پايين
- Village
- Location within Iran
- Coordinates: 37°14′56″N 54°41′51″E
- Country: Iran
- Province: Golestan
- County: Aqqala
- District: Voshmgir
- Rural District: Mazraeh-ye Shomali

Population (2016)
  - Total: 152
- Time zone: UTC+3:30 (IRST)

Eslamabad-e Pain (Persian: اسلام آباد پايين) (Note: Also romanized as Eslāmābād-e Paeen and Eslāmābād-e Pā’īn) is a village in Mazraeh-ye Shomali Rural District (Note: Formerly Mazraeh Rural District) of Voshmgir District in Aqqala County, Golestan province, Iran.

== Demographics ==
=== Population ===
At the time of the 2006 National Census, the village's population was 327 in 60 households. The following census in 2011 counted 190 people in 46 households. The 2016 census measured the population of the village as 152 people in 43 households.
