= Owneq Yelqi =

Owneq Yelqi or Uneq Yelqi (Persian: اونق يلقي) may refer to:

- Owneq Yelqi-ye Olya
- Owneq Yelqi-ye Sofla
