= Gamishli =

Gamishli (Persian: گاميشلي) may refer to:

- Gamishli Nazar
- Gamishli-ye Khvajeh Nafas
- Gamishli Yelqi
