= Aq Dagesh-e Olya =

Village in Golestan province, Iran

Aq Dagesh-e Olya Persian: آقدگش عليا
- Village
- Location within Iran
- Coordinates: 37°05′01″N 54°33′32″E
- Country: Iran
- Province: Golestan
- County: Aqqala
- District: Voshmgir
- Rural District: Mazraeh-ye Jonubi

Population (2016)
  - Total: 1,280
- Time zone: UTC+3:30 (IRST)

Aq Dagesh-e Olya (Persian: آقدگش عليا) (Note: Also romanized as Āq Dagesh-e ‘Olyā; also known as Āq Dagesh, Āq Dagesh-e Bālā, and Āq Gash-e Bālā) is a village in Mazraeh-ye Jonubi Rural District of Voshmgir District in Aqqala County, Golestan province, Iran.

== Demographics ==
=== Population ===
At the time of the 2006 National Census, the village's population was 1,010 in 204 households. The following census in 2011 counted 1,152 people in 270 households. The 2016 census measured the population of the village as 1,280 people in 315 households.
