= Tumachlar-e Charqoli =

Village in Golestan province, Iran

Tumachlar-e Charqoli Persian: توماچلر چارقلي
- Village
- Location within Iran
- Coordinates: 36°59′12″N 54°03′10″E
- Country: Iran
- Province: Golestan
- County: Gomishan
- District: Central
- Rural District: Jafarbay-ye Gharbi

Population (2016)
  - Total: 664
- Time zone: UTC+3:30 (IRST)

Tumachlar-e Charqoli (Persian: توماچلر چارقلي) (Note: Also romanized as Tūmāchlar-e Chārqolī; formerly known as Tumachlar (توماچلار), also romanized as Tūmāchlar; also known as Tūmīāchlar Khvājeh Nafas) is a village in Jafarbay-ye Gharbi Rural District of the Central District in Gomishan County, Golestan province, Iran.

== Demographics ==
=== Population ===
At the time of the 2006 National Census, the village's population, as Tumachlar, was 457 in 89 households, when it was in the former Gomishan District of Torkaman County. The following census in 2011 counted 616 people in 138 households, by which time the district had been separated from the county in the establishment of Gomishan County. The village was listed as Tumachlar-e Charqoli and the rural district was transferred to the new Central District. The 2016 census measured the population of the village as 664 people in 175 households.
