= Basirabad =

Basirabad (Persian: بصيراباد) may refer to:

- Basirabad, East Azerbaijan
- Basirabad, Golestan
