= Bagh-e Sheykh Musa =

Village in Golestan province, Iran

Bagh-e Sheykh Musa Persian: باغه شيخ موسی
- Village
- Location within Iran
- Coordinates: 37°04′59″N 54°45′01″E
- Country: Iran
- Province: Golestan
- County: Aqqala
- District: Central
- Rural District: Sheykh Musa

Population (2016)
  - Total: 370
- Time zone: UTC+3:30 (IRST)

Bagh-e Sheykh Musa (Persian: باغه شيخ موسی) (Note: Also romanized as Bāgh-e Sheykh Mūsá) is a village in Sheykh Musa Rural District of the Central District in Aqqala County, Golestan province, Iran.

== Demographics ==
=== Population ===
At the time of the 2006 National Census, the village's population was 346 in 77 households. The following census in 2011 counted 320 people in 76 households. The 2016 census measured the population of the village as 370 people in 96 households.
