= Qarah Tappeh, Aqqala =

Village in Golestan province, Iran

Qarah Tappeh Persian: قره تپه
- Village
- Location within Iran
- Coordinates: 37°02′19″N 54°35′51″E
- Country: Iran
- Province: Golestan
- County: Aqqala
- District: Central
- Rural District: Aq Altin

Population (2016)
  - Total: 435
- Time zone: UTC+3:30 (IRST)

Qarah Tappeh (Persian: قره‌تپه) (Note: Also romanized as Qareh Tappeh) is a village in Aq Altin Rural District of the Central District in Aqqala County, Golestan province, Iran.

== Demographics ==
=== Population ===
At the time of the 2006 National Census, the village's population was 334 in 68 households. The following census in 2011 counted 386 people in 90 households. The 2016 census measured the population of the village as 435 people in 129 households.
