= Bagh-e Yolmeh Salian =

Village in Golestan province, Iran

Bagh-e Yolmeh Salian Persian: باغه يلمه ساليان
- Village
- Location within Iran
- Coordinates: 37°07′59″N 54°43′38″E
- Country: Iran
- Province: Golestan
- County: Aqqala
- District: Central
- Rural District: Sheykh Musa

Population (2016)
  - Total: 232
- Time zone: UTC+3:30 (IRST)

Bagh-e Yolmeh Salian (Persian: باغه يلمه ساليان) (Note: Also romanized as Bāgh-e Yolmeh Sālīān) is a village in Sheykh Musa Rural District of the Central District in Aqqala County, Golestan province, Iran.

== Demographics ==
=== Population ===
At the time of the 2006 National Census, the village's population was 196 in 32 households. The following census in 2011 counted 212 people in 46 households. The 2016 census measured the population of the village as 232 people in 61 households.
