= Shur Hayat =

Village in Golestan province, Iran

Shur Hayat Persian: شورحيات
- Village
- Location within Iran
- Coordinates: 36°57′34″N 54°27′44″E
- Country: Iran
- Province: Golestan
- County: Aqqala
- District: Central
- Rural District: Gorganbuy

Population (2016)
  - Total: 1,076
- Time zone: UTC+3:30 (IRST)

Shur Hayat (Persian: شورحيات) (Note: Also romanized as Shūr Ḩayāt) is a village in Gorganbuy Rural District of the Central District in Aqqala County, Golestan province, Iran.

== Demographics ==
=== Population ===
At the time of the 2006 National Census, the village's population was 795 in 167 households. The following census in 2011 counted 937 people in 215 households. The 2016 census measured the population of the village as 1,076 people in 292 households.
