= Saqar Tappeh =

Village in Golestan province, Iran

Saqar Tappeh Persian: سقرتپه
- Village
- Location within Iran
- Coordinates: 37°05′26″N 54°21′45″E
- Country: Iran
- Province: Golestan
- County: Gomishan
- District: Goldasht
- Rural District: Jafarbay-ye Sharqi

Population (2016)
  - Total: 1,447
- Time zone: UTC+3:30 (IRST)

Saqar Tappeh (Persian: سقرتپه) is a village in Jafarbay-ye Sharqi Rural District of Goldasht District in Gomishan County, Golestan province, Iran.

== Demographics ==
=== Population ===
At the time of the 2006 National Census, the village's population was 1,101 in 195 households, when it was in the former Gomishan District of Torkaman County. The following census in 2011 counted 1,322 people in 305 households, by which time the district had been separated from the county in the establishment of Gomishan County. The rural district was transferred to the new Goldasht District. The 2016 census measured the population of the village as 1,447 people in 379 households.
