= Heydarabad, Aqqala =

Village in Golestan province, Iran

Heydarabad Persian: حیدرآباد
- Village
- Location within Iran
- Coordinates: 36°56′42″N 54°32′33″E
- Country: Iran
- Province: Golestan
- County: Aqqala
- District: Central
- Rural District: Gorganbuy

Population (2016)
  - Total: 158
- Time zone: UTC+3:30 (IRST)

Heydarabad (Persian: حیدرآباد) (Note: Also romanized as Ḩeydarābād) is a village in Gorganbuy Rural District of the Central District in Aqqala County, Golestan province, Iran.

== Demographics ==
=== Population ===
At the time of the 2006 National Census, the village's population was 122 in 22 households. The following census in 2011 counted 148 people in 38 households. The 2016 census measured the population of the village as 158 people in 42 households.
