= Sazeman-e Shakrian =

Village in Golestan province, Iran

Sazeman-e Shakrian Persian: سازمان شاكريان
- Village
- Location within Iran
- Coordinates: 37°05′38″N 54°50′42″E
- Country: Iran
- Province: Golestan
- County: Aqqala
- District: Central
- Rural District: Sheykh Musa

Population (2016)
  - Total: 132
- Time zone: UTC+3:30 (IRST)

Sazeman-e Shakrian (Persian: سازمان شاكريان) (Note: Also romanized as Sāzemān-e Shāḵrīān) is a village in Sheykh Musa Rural District of the Central District in Aqqala County, Golestan province, Iran.

== Demographics ==
=== Population ===
At the time of the 2006 National Census, the village's population was 137 in 29 households. The following census in 2011 counted 124 people in 30 households. The 2016 census measured the population of the village as 132 people in 37 households.
