= Shaftalu Bagh =

Shaftalu Bagh (Persian: شفتالوباغ) may refer to:

- Shaftalu Bagh-e Olya
- Shaftalu Bagh-e Sofla
