= Gug Tappeh-ye Yek =

Village in Golestan province, Iran

Gug Tappeh-ye Yek Persian: گُوگْ تَپِّه يِكْ
- Village
- Location within Iran
- Coordinates: 37°10′56″N 54°39′25″E
- Country: Iran
- Province: Golestan
- County: Aqqala
- District: Voshmgir
- Rural District: Mazraeh-ye Shomali

Population (2016)
  - Total: 968
- Time zone: UTC+3:30 (IRST)

Gug Tappeh-ye Yek (Persian: گُوگْ تَپِّه يِكْ) (Note: Also romanized as Gūg Tappeh-ye Yek) is a village in Mazraeh-ye Shomali Rural District (Note: Formerly Mazraeh Rural District) of Voshmgir District in Aqqala County, Golestan province, Iran.

== Demographics ==
=== Population ===
At the time of the 2006 National Census, the village's population was 741 in 180 households. The following census in 2011 counted 934 people in 255 households. The 2016 census measured the population of the village as 968 people in 276 households.
