= Osmanabad, Golestan =

Village in Golestan province, Iran

Osmanabad Persian: عثمان آباد
- Village
- Location within Iran
- Coordinates: 36°57′30″N 54°34′12″E
- Country: Iran
- Province: Golestan
- County: Aqqala
- District: Central
- Rural District: Gorganbuy

Population (2016)
  - Total: 343
- Time zone: UTC+3:30 (IRST)

Osmanabad (Persian: عثمان آباد) (Note: Also romanized as ‘Os̄mānābād) is a village in Gorganbuy Rural District of the Central District in Aqqala County, Golestan province, Iran.

== Demographics ==
=== Population ===
At the time of the 2006 National Census, the village's population was 315 in 62 households. The following census in 2011 counted 340 people in 94 households. The 2016 census measured the population of the village as 343 people in 87 households.
