= Shahrak-e Vahdat-e Eslami =

Village in Golestan province, Iran

Shahrak-e Vahdat-e Eslami Persian: شهرک وحدت اسلامی
- town
- Location within Iran
- Coordinates: 37.23°N 54.758°E
- Country: Iran
- Province: Golestan
- County: Aqqala
- District: Voshmgir
- Rural District: Mazraeh-ye Shomali

Population (2016)
  - Total: 1,622
- Time zone: UTC+3:30 (IRST)

Shahrak-e Vahdat-e Eslami (Persian: شهرک وحدت اسلامی) (Note: Also romanized as Shahrak-e Vaḥdat-e Eslāmī; also known as Vaḥdat-e Eslāmī) is a town in Mazraeh-ye Shomali Rural District (Note: Formerly Mazraeh Rural District) of Voshmgir District in Aqqala County, Golestan province, Iran.

== Demographics ==
=== Population ===
At the time of the 2006 National Census, the town's population was 1,441 in 308 households, when it was in Bagheli-ye Marama Rural District of the Central District in Gonbad-e Kavus County. The following census in 2011 counted 1,533 people in 364 households, by which time it had been transferred to Mazraeh-ye Shomali Rural District of Voshmgir District in Aqqala County. The 2016 census measured the population of the town as 1,622 people in 455 households.
