= Sad-e Gorgan =

Village in Golestan province, Iran

Sad-e Gorgan Persian: سد گرگان
- Village
- Location within Iran
- Coordinates: 37°12′20″N 54°44′13″E
- Country: Iran
- Province: Golestan
- County: Aqqala
- District: Voshmgir
- Rural District: Mazraeh-ye Shomali

Population (2016)
  - Total: 109
- Time zone: UTC+3:30 (IRST)

Sad-e Gorgan (Persian: سد گرگان) (Note: Also romanized as Sad-e Gorgān; formerly known as Sadgorgan va Ettehad Seh (سدگرگان و اتحاد 3), also romanized as Sadgorgān va Etteḩād Seh) is a dam and a settlement in Mazraeh-ye Shomali Rural District (Note: Formerly Mazraeh Rural District) of Voshmgir District in Aqqala County, Golestan province, Iran.

== Demographics ==
=== Population ===
At the time of the 2006 National Census, the village's population, as Sadgorgan va Ettehad Seh, was 118 in 23 households. The following census in 2011 counted 74 people in 19 households, by which time the village was listed as Sad-e Gorgan. The 2016 census measured the population of the village as 109 people in 33 households.
