= Yolmeh Khandan =

Village in Golestan province, Iran

Yolmeh Khandan Persian: يلمه خندان
- Village
- Location within Iran
- Coordinates: 37°01′15″N 54°29′54″E
- Country: Iran
- Province: Golestan
- County: Aqqala
- District: Central
- Rural District: Gorganbuy

Population (2016)
  - Total: 1,313
- Time zone: UTC+3:30 (IRST)

Yolmeh Khandan (Persian: يلمه خندان) (Note: Also romanized as Yolmeh Khandān; also known as Yolmeh Khandān-e Pā’īn and Yūlmeh Khandān) is a village in Gorganbuy Rural District of the Central District in Aqqala County, Golestan province, Iran.

== Demographics ==
=== Population ===
At the time of the 2006 National Census, the village's population was 1,007 in 193 households. The following census in 2011 counted 1,229 people in 315 households. The 2016 census measured the population of the village as 1,313 people in 329 households.
