= Akbarabad, Aqqala =

Village in Golestan province, Iran

Akbarabad Persian: اكبرآباد
- Village
- Location within Iran
- Coordinates: 36°58′10″N 54°38′36″E
- Country: Iran
- Province: Golestan
- County: Aqqala
- District: Central
- Rural District: Aq Altin

Population (2016)
  - Total: 120
- Time zone: UTC+3:30 (IRST)

Akbarabad (Persian: اكبرآباد) (Note: Also romanized as Akbarābād) is a village in Aq Altin Rural District of the Central District in Aqqala County, Golestan province, Iran.

== Demographics ==
=== Population ===
At the time of the 2006 National Census, the village's population was 162 in 38 households. The following census in 2011 counted 108 people in 39 households. The 2016 census measured the population of the village as 120 people in 38 households.
