= Khujeh Tup =

Village in Golestan province, Iran

Khujeh Tup Persian: خوجه توپ
- Village
- Location within Iran
- Coordinates: 36°56′29″N 54°31′08″E
- Country: Iran
- Province: Golestan
- County: Aqqala
- District: Central
- Rural District: Gorganbuy

Population (2016)
  - Total: 200
- Time zone: UTC+3:30 (IRST)

Khujeh Tup (Persian: خوجه توپ) (Note: Also romanized as Khūjeh Tūp) is a village in Gorganbuy Rural District of the Central District in Aqqala County, Golestan province, Iran.

== Demographics ==
=== Population ===
At the time of the 2006 National Census, the village's population was 169 in 33 households. The following census in 2011 counted 181 people in 43 households. The 2016 census measured the population of the village as 200 people in 61 households.
