= Qezli, Golestan =

Village in Golestan province, Iran

Qezli Persian: قزلی
- Village
- Location within Iran
- Coordinates: 37°01′13″N 54°36′42″E
- Country: Iran
- Province: Golestan
- County: Aqqala
- District: Central
- Rural District: Aq Altin

Population (2016)
  - Total: 1,194
- Time zone: UTC+3:30 (IRST)

Qezli (Persian: قزلی) (Note: Also romanized as Qezlī; also known as Qezellī) is a village in Aq Altin Rural District of the Central District in Aqqala County, Golestan province, Iran.

== Demographics ==
=== Population ===
At the time of the 2006 National Census, the village's population was 937 in 197 households. The following census in 2011 counted 1,248 people in 330 households. The 2016 census measured the population of the village as 1,194 people in 308 households.
