= Eslamabad-e Bala =

Village in Golestan province, Iran

Eslamabad-e Bala Persian: اسلام آباد بالا
- Village
- Location within Iran
- Coordinates: 37°13′55″N 54°43′25″E
- Country: Iran
- Province: Golestan
- County: Aqqala
- District: Voshmgir
- Rural District: Mazraeh-ye Shomali

Population (2016)
  - Total: 1,561
- Time zone: UTC+3:30 (IRST)

Eslamabad-e Bala (Persian: اسلام آباد بالا) (Note: Also romanized as Eslāmābād-e Bālā; also known as Eslāmābād) is a village in Mazraeh-ye Shomali Rural District (Note: Formerly Mazraeh Rural District) of Voshmgir District in Aqqala County, Golestan province, Iran.

== Demographics ==
=== Population ===
At the time of the 2006 National Census, the village's population was 1,251 in 240 households. The following census in 2011 counted 1,406 people in 348 households. The 2016 census measured the population of the village as 1,561 people in 413 households.
