= Kord, Iran =

Village in Golestan province, Iran

Kord Persian: كرد
- Village
- Location within Iran
- Coordinates: 37°01′07″N 54°38′48″E
- Country: Iran
- Province: Golestan
- County: Aqqala
- District: Central
- Rural District: Aq Altin

Population (2016)
  - Total: 2,234
- Time zone: UTC+3:30 (IRST)

Kord (Persian: كرد) (Note: Also known as Kordābād) is a village in Aq Altin Rural District of the Central District in Aqqala County, Golestan province, Iran.

== Demographics ==
=== Population ===
At the time of the 2006 National Census, the village's population was 1,822 in 376 households. The following census in 2011 counted 2,195 people in 583 households. The 2016 census measured the population of the village as 2,234 people in 639 households.
