= Mirza Ali-ye Yelqi =

Village in Golestan province, Iran

Mirza Ali-ye Yelqi Persian: ميرزاعلی يلقی
- Village
- Location within Iran
- Coordinates: 37°02′00″N 54°32′18″E
- Country: Iran
- Province: Golestan
- County: Aqqala
- District: Central
- Rural District: Gorganbuy

Population (2016)
  - Total: 1,234
- Time zone: UTC+3:30 (IRST)

Mirza Ali-ye Yelqi (Persian: ميرزاعلی يلقی) (Note: Also romanized as Mīrzā ‘Alī-ye Yelqī and Mīrzā ‘Alī-ye Yolqī; also known as Mīrzā ‘Alī-ye Yolfī) is a village in Gorganbuy Rural District of the Central District in Aqqala County, Golestan province, Iran.

== Demographics ==
=== Population ===
At the time of the 2006 National Census, the village's population was 1,064 in 212 households. The following census in 2011 counted 1,124 people in 267 households. The 2016 census measured the population of the village as 1,234 people in 344 households.
