= Karim Ishan =

Karim Ishan or Karimishan (Persian: كريم ايشان) may refer to:

- Karim Ishan, Maraveh Tappeh
- Karim Ishan, Torkaman
