= Arkh =

Arkh (Persian: ارخ) may refer to:

- Arkh-e Bozorg
- Arkh-e Kuchek
