= Sazeman-e Enqelab =

Village in Golestan province, Iran

Sazeman-e Enqelab Persian: سازمان انقلاب
- Village
- Location within Iran
- Coordinates: 37°13′5″N 54°41′33″E
- Country: Iran
- Province: Golestan
- County: Aqqala
- District: Voshmgir
- Rural District: Mazraeh-ye Shomali

Population (2016)
  - Total: 1,405
- Time zone: UTC+3:30 (IRST)

Sazeman-e Enqelab (Persian: سازمان انقلاب) (Note: Also romanized as Sāzemān-e Enqelāb and Sāzmān-e Enqelāb; also known as Ja‘farbāy) is a village in Mazraeh-ye Shomali Rural District (Note: Formerly Mazraeh Rural District) of Voshmgir District in Aqqala County, Golestan province, Iran.

== Demographics ==
=== Population ===
At the time of the 2006 National Census, the village's population was 1,306 in 238 households. The following census in 2011 counted 1,367 people in 320 households. The 2016 census measured the population of the village as 1,405 people in 342 households.
