= Sakhiabad =

Sakhiabad (Persian: سخي آباد) may refer to:

- Sakhiabad, Golestan
- Sakhiabad, Isfahan
- Sakhiabad, Sistan and Baluchestan
