= Bahalkeh-ye Bayram Akhund =

Village in Golestan province, Iran

Bahalkeh-ye Bayram Akhund Persian: بهلكه بايرام اخوند
- Village
- Location within Iran
- Coordinates: 37°04′08″N 54°47′16″E
- Country: Iran
- Province: Golestan
- County: Aqqala
- District: Central
- Rural District: Sheykh Musa

Population (2016)
  - Total: 692
- Time zone: UTC+3:30 (IRST)

Bahalkeh-ye Bayram Akhund (Persian: بهلكه بايرام اخوند) (Note: Also romanized as Bahalkeh-ye Bāyrām Ākhūnd; also known as Bahalkeh-ye Bahrām Ākhūnd) is a village in Sheykh Musa Rural District of the Central District in Aqqala County, Golestan province, Iran.

== Demographics ==
=== Population ===
At the time of the 2006 National Census, the village's population was 582 in 127 households. The following census in 2011 counted 626 people in 160 households. The 2016 census measured the population of the village as 692 people in 183 households.
