= Piravash-e Sofla =

Village in Golestan province, Iran

Piravash-e Sofla Persian: پيرواش سفلي
- Village
- Location within Iran
- Coordinates: 36°58′08″N 54°39′50″E
- Country: Iran
- Province: Golestan
- County: Aqqala
- District: Central
- Rural District: Aq Altin

Population (2016)
  - Total: 4,667
- Time zone: UTC+3:30 (IRST)

Piravash-e Sofla (Persian: پيرواش سفلي) (Note: Also romanized as Pīrāvash-e Soflá; also known as Pīrāvash, Pīrāvash-e Jorjānīyeh, Pīrāvash-e Pā’īn, and Pīrāvosh) is a village in Aq Altin Rural District of the Central District in Aqqala County, Golestan province, Iran.

== Demographics ==
=== Population ===
At the time of the 2006 National Census, the village's population was 4,692 in 1,016 households. The following census in 2011 counted 4,822 people in 1,340 households. The 2016 census measured the population of the village as 4,667 people in 1,298 households.
