= Neftelijeh Rural District =

Rural district in Golestan province, Iran

Neftelijeh Rural District Persian: دهستان نفتلیجه
- Rural District
- Location within Iran
- Coordinates: 37°11′N 54°06′E
- Country: Iran
- Province: Golestan
- County: Gomishan
- District: Central
- Established: 2009
- Capital: Qaleh Jiq-e Bozorg

Population (2016)
  - Total: 3,741
- Time zone: UTC+3:30 (IRST)

Neftelijeh Rural District (Persian: دهستان نفتلیجه) is in the Central District of Gomishan County, Golestan province, Iran. Its capital is the village of Qaleh Jiq-e Bozorg.

== History ==
In 2009, Gomishan District was separated from Torkaman County in the establishment of Gomishan County, and Neftelijeh Rural District was created in the new Central District.

== Demographics ==
=== Population ===
At the time of the 2011 census, the rural district's population was 3,517 in 823 households. The 2016 census measured the population of the rural district as 3,741 in 1,013 households. The most populous of its 10 villages was Qaleh Jiq-e Bozorg, with 1,374 people.

=== Other villages in the rural district ===
- Altin Tokhmaq
- Kalleh Post
- Nardaneli
- Qaleh Jiq-e Kuchek
- Qolmas
- Safa Ishan
