= Bahalkeh-ye Sheykh Musa =

Village in Golestan province, Iran

Bahalkeh-ye Sheykh Musa Persian: بهلكه شيخ موسی
- Village
- Location within Iran
- Coordinates: 37°06′13″N 54°46′35″E
- Country: Iran
- Province: Golestan
- County: Aqqala
- District: Central
- Rural District: Sheykh Musa

Population (2016)
  - Total: 2,251
- Time zone: UTC+3:30 (IRST)

Bahalkeh-ye Sheykh Musa (Persian: بهلكه شيخ موسی) (Note: Also romanized as Bahalkeh-ye Sheykh Mūsá) is a village in Sheykh Musa Rural District of the Central District in Aqqala County, Golestan province, Iran.

== Demographics ==
=== Population ===
At the time of the 2006 National Census, the village's population was 1,834 in 356 households. The following census in 2011 counted 2,027 people in 545 households. The 2016 census measured the population of the village as 2,251 people in 616 households.
