= Qezel Alan Rural District =

Rural district in Golestan province, Iran

Qezel Alan Rural District Persian: دهستان قزل‌آلان
- Rural District
- Location within Iran
- Coordinates: 36°59′N 54°18′E
- Country: Iran
- Province: Golestan
- County: Gomishan
- District: Goldasht
- Established: 2009
- Capital: Arkh-e Bozorg

Population (2016)
  - Total: 10,211
- Time zone: UTC+3:30 (IRST)

Qezel Alan Rural District (Persian: دهستان قزل‌آلان) is in Goldasht District of Gomishan County, Golestan province, Iran. Its capital is the village of Arkh-e Bozorg.

== History ==
In 2009, Gomishan District was separated from Torkaman County in the establishment of Gomishan County, and Qezel Alan Rural District was created in the new Goldasht District.

== Demographics ==
=== Population ===
At the time of the 2011 census, the rural district's population was 9,348 in 2,144 households. The 2016 census measured the population of the rural district as 10,211 in 2,837 households. The most populous of its eight villages was Qaranjik-e Khvajeh Khan, with 3,414 people.

=== Other villages in the rural district ===
- Karim Ishan
- Qaleh-ye Gomesh Dafeh
- Qaleh-ye Hajji Galdi Khan
- Qaleh-ye Qarah Jalar
- Qaranjik-e Gukcheli
- Tumachlar
