= Qaranjik-e Pur Aman =

Village in Golestan province, Iran

Qaranjik-e Pur Aman Persian: قرنجيك پورامان
- Village
- Location within Iran
- Coordinates: 37°03′58″N 54°32′30″E
- Country: Iran
- Province: Golestan
- County: Aqqala
- District: Voshmgir
- Rural District: Mazraeh-ye Jonubi

Population (2016)
  - Total: 1,319
- Time zone: UTC+3:30 (IRST)

Qaranjik-e Pur Aman (Persian: قرنجيك پورامان) (Note: Also romanized as Qaranjīk-e Pūr Amān; also known as Qaranjīk-e Lūrāmān) is a village in Mazraeh-ye Jonubi Rural District of Voshmgir District in Aqqala County, Golestan province, Iran.

== Demographics ==
=== Population ===
At the time of the 2006 National Census, the village's population was 1,065 in 197 households. The following census in 2011 counted 1,242 people in 314 households. The 2016 census measured the population of the village as 1,319 people in 352 households.
