= Tokhmaq =

Tokhmaq may refer to:

- Altin Tokhmaq, village in Iran
- Mohammad Khan Tokhmaq Ustajlu, 16th-century Iranian official
