= Aq Qabr =

Village in Golestan province, Iran

Aq Qabr Persian: آق قبر
- Village
- Location within Iran
- Coordinates: 37°00′46″N 54°23′19″E
- Country: Iran
- Province: Golestan
- County: Aqqala
- District: Central
- Rural District: Gorganbuy

Population (2016)
  - Total: 768
- Time zone: UTC+3:30 (IRST)

Aq Qabr (Persian: آق قبر) (Note: Also romanized as Āq Qabr) is a village in Gorganbuy Rural District of the Central District in Aqqala County, Golestan province, Iran.

== Demographics ==
=== Population ===
At the time of the 2006 National Census, the village's population was 639 in 128 households. The following census in 2011 counted 736 people in 187 households. The 2016 census measured the population of the village as 768 people in 214 households.
