= Piravash-e Olya =

Village in Golestan province, Iran

Piravash-e Olya Persian: پيرواش عليا
- Village
- Location within Iran
- Coordinates: 36°57′26″N 54°40′45″E
- Country: Iran
- Province: Golestan
- County: Aqqala
- District: Central
- Rural District: Aq Altin

Population (2016)
  - Total: 638
- Time zone: UTC+3:30 (IRST)

Piravash-e Olya (Persian: پيرواش عليا) (Note: Also romanized as Pīrāvash-e ‘Olyā; also known as Pīrāvash-e Bālā and Pīrāvash-e Ḩājjī Ḩabīb) is a village in Aq Altin Rural District of the Central District in Aqqala County, Golestan province, Iran.

== Demographics ==
=== Population ===
At the time of the 2006 National Census, the village's population was 606 in 130 households. The following census in 2011 counted 636 people in 175 households. The 2016 census measured the population of the village as 638 people in 182 households.
