= Owneq Yelqi-ye Sofla =

Village in Golestan province, Iran

Owneq Yelqi-ye Sofla Persian: اونق يلقی سفلی
- Village
- Location within Iran
- Coordinates: 36°59′48″N 54°34′30″E
- Country: Iran
- Province: Golestan
- County: Aqqala
- District: Central
- Rural District: Aq Altin

Population (2016)
  - Total: 595
- Time zone: UTC+3:30 (IRST)

Owneq Yelqi-ye Sofla (Persian: اونق يلقی سفلی) (Note: Also romanized as Owneq Yelqī-ye Soflá; also known as Ūneq Yelqī-ye Pā’īn) is a village in Aq Altin Rural District of the Central District in Aqqala County, Golestan province, Iran.

== Demographics ==
=== Population ===
At the time of the 2006 National Census, the village's population was 448 in 91 households. The following census in 2011 counted 551 people in 134 households. The 2016 census measured the population of the village as 595 people in 179 households.
