= Pir Aghach =

Village in Golestan province, Iran

Pir Aghach Persian: پيرآغاچ
- Village
- Location within Iran
- Coordinates: 36°57′21″N 54°33′42″E
- Country: Iran
- Province: Golestan
- County: Aqqala
- District: Central
- Rural District: Gorganbuy

Population (2016)
  - Total: 467
- Time zone: UTC+3:30 (IRST)

Pir Aghach (Persian: پیرآغاچ) (Note: Also romanized as Pīr Āghāch; also known as Pīr Āghāj) is a village in Gorganbuy Rural District of the Central District in Aqqala County, Golestan province, Iran.

== Demographics ==
=== Population ===
At the time of the 2006 National Census, the village's population was 414 in 92 households. The following census in 2011 counted 434 people in 98 households. The 2016 census measured the population of the village as 467 people in 118 households.
