= Yolmeh Salian =

Village in Golestan province, Iran

Yolmeh Salian Persian: يلمه ساليان
- Village
- Location within Iran
- Coordinates: 37°11′09″N 54°44′02″E
- Country: Iran
- Province: Golestan
- County: Aqqala
- District: Voshmgir
- Rural District: Mazraeh-ye Shomali

Population (2016)
  - Total: 4,103
- Time zone: UTC+3:30 (IRST)

Yolmeh Salian (Persian: يلمه ساليان) (Note: Also romanized as Yolmeh Sālīān and Yolmeh Sālīyān; also known as Yulmeh Sālīān) is a village in Mazraeh-ye Shomali Rural District (Note: Formerly Mazraeh Rural District) of Voshmgir District in Aqqala County, Golestan province, Iran.

== Demographics ==
=== Population ===
At the time of the 2006 National Census, the village's population was 3,263 in 678 households. The following census in 2011 counted 3,922 people in 1,002 households. The 2016 census measured the population of the village as 4,103 people in 1,104 households. It was the most populous village in its rural district.
