= Pir Aghaj =

Pir Aghaj (Persian: پير آغاج) may refer to:

- Pir Aghaj, Ardabil
- Pir Aghaj, Golestan
