= Hajji Qush =

Hajji Qush (Persian: حاجي قوش) may refer to:

- Hajji Qareh
- Hajji Qushan
