= Gumshan =

Gumshan may refer to:

- Gold Mountain (Chinese name for part of North America)
- Gomishan, a city in Iran
