= Bahalkeh-ye Dashli =

Village in Golestan province, Iran

Bahalkeh-ye Dashli Persian: بهلكه داشلی
- Village
- Location within Iran
- Coordinates: 37°03′19″N 54°47′36″E
- Country: Iran
- Province: Golestan
- County: Aqqala
- District: Central
- Rural District: Sheykh Musa

Population (2016)
  - Total: 1,077
- Time zone: UTC+3:30 (IRST)

Bahalkeh-ye Dashli (Persian: بهلكه داشلی) (Note: Also romanized as Bahalkeh-ye Dāshlī and Behelkeh-ye Dāshlī) is a village in Sheykh Musa Rural District of the Central District in Aqqala County, Golestan province, Iran.

== Demographics ==
=== Population ===
At the time of the 2006 National Census, the village's population was 921 in 168 households. The following census in 2011 counted 1,073 people in 282 households. The 2016 census measured the population of the village as 1,077 people in 312 households.
