= Gamishli Yelqi =

Village in Golestan province, Iran

Gamishli Yelqi Persian: گاميشلی يلقی
- Village
- Location within Iran
- Coordinates: 36°59′15″N 54°32′59″E
- Country: Iran
- Province: Golestan
- County: Aqqala
- District: Central
- Rural District: Gorganbuy

Population (2016)
  - Total: 1,490
- Time zone: UTC+3:30 (IRST)

Gamishli Yelqi (Persian: گاميشلی يلقی) (Note: Also romanized as Gāmīshlī Yelqī and Gomīshlī Yelqī; also known as Vakīlī (وکیلی)) is a village in Gorganbuy Rural District of the Central District in Aqqala County, Golestan province, Iran.

== Demographics ==
=== Population ===
At the time of the 2006 National Census, the village's population was 1,466 in 324 households. The following census in 2011 counted 1,462 people in 400 households. The 2016 census measured the population of the village as 1,490 people in 424 households.
