= Sakhiabad, Golestan =

Village in Golestan province, Iran

Sakhiabad Persian: سخی آباد
- Village
- Location within Iran
- Coordinates: 37°06′42″N 54°45′35″E
- Country: Iran
- Province: Golestan
- County: Aqqala
- District: Central
- Rural District: Sheykh Musa

Population (2016)
  - Total: 457
- Time zone: UTC+3:30 (IRST)

Sakhiabad (Persian: سخی آباد) (Note: Also romanized as Sakhīābād) is a village in Sheykh Musa Rural District of the Central District in Aqqala County, Golestan province, Iran.

== Demographics ==
=== Population ===
At the time of the 2006 National Census, the village's population was 255 in 57 households. The following census in 2011 counted 373 people in 110 households. The 2016 census measured the population of the village as 457 people in 117 households.
