= Shaftalu Bagh-e Olya =

Village in Golestan province, Iran

Shaftalu Bagh-e Olya Persian: شفتالوباغ عليا
- Village
- Location within Iran
- Coordinates: 37°00′35″N 54°40′11″E
- Country: Iran
- Province: Golestan
- County: Aqqala
- District: Central
- Rural District: Aq Altin

Population (2016)
  - Total: 2,202
- Time zone: UTC+3:30 (IRST)

Shaftalu Bagh-e Olya (Persian: شفتالوباغ عليا) (Note: Also romanized as Shaftālū Bāgh-e ‘Olyā; also known as Shaftālū Bāgh-e Bālā) is a village in Aq Altin Rural District of the Central District in Aqqala County, Golestan province, Iran.

== Demographics ==
=== Population ===
At the time of the 2006 National Census, the village's population was 1,798 in 328 households. The following census in 2011 counted 2,089 people in 569 households. The 2016 census measured the population of the village as 2,202 people in 541 households.
