= Owneq Yelqi-ye Olya =

Village in Golestan province, Iran

Owneq Yelqi-ye Olya Persian: اونق يلقی عليا
- Village
- Location within Iran
- Coordinates: 36°59′07″N 54°34′45″E
- Country: Iran
- Province: Golestan
- County: Aqqala
- District: Central
- Rural District: Aq Altin

Population (2016)
  - Total: 1,539
- Time zone: UTC+3:30 (IRST)

Owneq Yelqi-ye Olya (Persian: اونق يلقی عليا) (Note: Also romanized as Owneq Yelqī-ye ‘Olyā; also known as Ūneq Yelqī-ye Bālā) is a village in Aq Altin Rural District of the Central District in Aqqala County, Golestan province, Iran.

== Demographics ==
=== Population ===
At the time of the 2006 National Census, the village's population was 1,193 in 245 households. The following census in 2011 counted 1,469 people in 334 households. The 2016 census measured the population of the village as 1,539 people in 403 households.
