= Qorbanabad, Golestan =

Village in Golestan province, Iran

Qorbanabad Persian: قربان آباد
- Village
- Location within Iran
- Coordinates: 36°55′47″N 54°26′25″E
- Country: Iran
- Province: Golestan
- County: Aqqala
- District: Central
- Rural District: Gorganbuy

Population (2016)
  - Total: 1,357
- Time zone: UTC+3:30 (IRST)

Qorbanabad (Persian: قربان آباد) (Note: Also romanized as Qorbānābād) is a village in Gorganbuy Rural District of the Central District in Aqqala County, Golestan province, Iran.

== Demographics ==
=== Population ===
At the time of the 2006 National Census, the village's population was 1,209 in 241 households. The following census in 2011 counted 1,336 people in 342 households. The 2016 census measured the population of the village as 1,357 people in 351 households.
