= Shaftalu Bagh-e Sofla =

Village in Golestan province, Iran

Shaftalu Bagh-e Sofla Persian: شفتالوباغ سفلي
- Village
- Location within Iran
- Coordinates: 37°00′47″N 54°39′12″E
- Country: Iran
- Province: Golestan
- County: Aqqala
- District: Central
- Rural District: Aq Altin

Population (2016)
  - Total: 1,784
- Time zone: UTC+3:30 (IRST)

Shaftalu Bagh-e Sofla (Persian: شفتالوباغ سفلي) (Note: Also romanized as Shaftālū Bāgh-e Soflá; also known as Shaftālū Bāgh-e Pā’īn) is a village in Aq Altin Rural District of the Central District in Aqqala County, Golestan province, Iran.

== Demographics ==
=== Population ===
At the time of the 2006 National Census, the village's population was 1,294 in 239 households. The following census in 2011 counted 1,579 people in 368 households. The 2016 census measured the population of the village as 1,784 people in 486 households.
