= Hajji Qareh =

Village in Golestan province, Iran

Hajji Qareh Persian: حاجی قره
- Village
- Location within Iran
- Coordinates: 36°57′22″N 54°26′43″E
- Country: Iran
- Province: Golestan
- County: Aqqala
- District: Central
- Rural District: Gorganbuy

Population (2016)
  - Total: 692
- Time zone: UTC+3:30 (IRST)

Hajji Qareh (Persian: حاجی قره) (Note: Also romanized as Ḩājjī Qareh; also known as Ḩājjī Qūsh) is a village in Gorganbuy Rural District of the Central District in Aqqala County, Golestan province, Iran.

== Demographics ==
=== Population ===
At the time of the 2006 National Census, the village's population was 549 in 104 households. The following census in 2011 counted 637 people in 149 households. The 2016 census measured the population of the village as 692 people in 177 households.
