= Gorganbuy Rural District =

Rural district in Golestan province, Iran

Gorganbuy Rural District Persian: دهستان گرگان بوئ
- Rural District
- Location within Iran
- Coordinates: 37°00′N 54°28′E
- Country: Iran
- Province: Golestan
- County: Aqqala
- District: Central
- Established: 1987
- Capital: Qanqormeh

Population (2016)
  - Total: 29,201
- Time zone: UTC+3:30 (IRST)

Gorganbuy Rural District (Persian: دهستان گرگان بوئ) is in the Central District of Aqqala County, Golestan province, Iran. Its capital is the village of Qanqormeh.

== Demographics ==
=== Population ===
At the time of the 2006 National Census, the rural district's population was 24,950 in 5,181 households. There were 27,343 inhabitants in 6,921 households at the following census of 2011. The 2016 census measured the population of the rural district as 29,201 in 7,883 households. The most populous of its 25 villages was Sahneh-ye Sofla, with 3,676 people.

=== Other villages in the rural district ===
- Aq Qabr
- Aq Tekeh Khan
- Aq Zabir
- Delijeh
- Do Gunchi
- Gamishli Yelqi
- Hajji Qareh
- Heydarabad
- Khujeh Tup
- Mirza Ali-ye Yelqi
- Mohammad Aleq
- Mohammadabad
- Osmanabad
- Pir Aghach
- Qaleh Jiq
- Qorbanabad
- Qushjanabad
- Salaq Yelqi
- Saqar Yelqi
- Seyyedlar
- Shur Hayat
- Yampi
- Yolmeh Khandan
