= Amirabad, Golestan =

Village in Golestan province, Iran

Amirabad Persian: اميراباد
- Village
- Location within Iran
- Coordinates: 36°52′52″N 54°25′28″E
- Country: Iran
- Province: Golestan
- County: Gorgan
- District: Central
- Rural District: Anjirab

Population (2016)
  - Total: 3,782
- Time zone: UTC+3:30 (IRST)

Amirabad (Persian: اميراباد) (Note: Also romanized as Amīrābād) is a village in Anjirab Rural District of the Central District in Gorgan County, Golestan province, Iran. The village is located just a few kilometers north of Gorgan's city limits, located by the Gorgan–Aq Qala road.

== Demographics ==
=== Population ===
At the time of the 2006 National Census, the village's population was 4,119 in 948 households. The following census in 2011 counted 4,336 people in 1,169 households. The 2016 census measured the population of the village as 3,782 people in 1,154 households.
