= Aq Altin Rural District =

Rural district in Golestan province, Iran

Aq Altin Rural District Persian: دهستان آق التين
- Rural District
- Location within Iran
- Coordinates: 37°00′N 54°39′E
- Country: Iran
- Province: Golestan
- County: Aqqala
- District: Central
- Established: 1987
- Capital: Ataabad

Population (2016)
  - Total: 22,020
- Time zone: UTC+3:30 (IRST)

Aq Altin Rural District (Persian: دهستان آق التين) is in the Central District of Aqqala County, Golestan province, Iran. Its capital is the village of Ataabad.

== Demographics ==
=== Population ===
At the time of the 2006 National Census, the rural district's population was 19,030 in 3,925 households. There were 21,460 inhabitants in 5,649 households at the following census of 2011. The 2016 census measured the population of the rural district as 22,020 in 6,017 households. The most populous of its 14 villages was Ataabad, with 5,333 people.

=== Other villages in the rural district ===
- Akbarabad
- Anbar Tappeh
- Kord
- Nasarkan-e Sofla
- Owneq Yelqi-ye Olya
- Owneq Yelqi-ye Sofla
- Piravash-e Olya
- Piravash-e Sofla
- Qarah Tappeh
- Qezli
- Shaftalu Bagh-e Olya
- Shaftalu Bagh-e Sofla
- Sheykh Tappeh
