= Siminshahr =

City in Golestan province, Iran

Siminshahr Persian: سيمين شهر
- City
- Location within Iran
- Coordinates: 37°00′41″N 54°13′54″E
- Country: Iran
- Province: Golestan
- County: Gomishan
- District: Goldasht
- Established as a city: 2002

Population (2016)
  - Total: 17,205
- Time zone: UTC+3:30 (IRST)

Siminshahr (Persian: سيمين شهر) (Note: Also romanized as Sīmīnshahr) is a city in, and the capital of, Goldasht District in Gomishan County, Golestan province, Iran. Its Bonavar neighborhood was the capital of Jafarbay-ye Sharqi Rural District until its capital was transferred to the village of Basirabad.

== History ==
In 2002, the villages of Bonavar (بناور), (Note: Capital of Jafarbay-ye Sharqi Rural District, Gomishan District, Torkaman County) Qarqi (قارقی), and Katuk (کتوک) merged to form the new city of Siminshahr.

== Demographics ==
=== Population ===
At the time of the 2006 National Census, the city's population was 13,545 in 2,762 households, when it was in the former Gomishan District of Torkaman County. The following census in 2011 counted 15,539 people in 3,666 households, by which time the district had been separated from the county in the establishment of Gomishan County. Siminshahr and the rural district were transferred to the new Goldasht District. The 2016 census measured the population of the city as 17,205 people in 4,493 households.
