= Mazraeh-ye Shomali Rural District =

Rural district in Golestan province, Iran

Mazraeh-ye Shomali Rural District Persian: دهستان مزرعه شمالي
- Rural District
- Location within Iran
- Coordinates: 37°17′N 54°30′E
- Country: Iran
- Province: Golestan
- County: Aqqala
- District: Voshmgir
- Established: 1987
- Capital: Anbar Olum

Population (2016)
  - Total: 16,061
- Time zone: UTC+3:30 (IRST)

Mazraeh-ye Shomali Rural District (Persian: دهستان مزرعه شمالي) (Note: Formerly Mazraeh Rural District (دهستان مزرعه)) is in Voshmgir District of Aqqala County, Golestan province, Iran. It is administered from the city of Anbar Olum.

== Demographics ==
=== Population ===
At the time of the 2006 National Census, the rural district's population was 13,399 in 2,732 households. There were 15,693 inhabitants in 3,937 households at the following census of 2011. The 2016 census measured the population of the rural district as 16,061 in 4,300 households. The most populous of its 20 villages was Yolmeh Salian, with 4,103 people.

The rural district has 3 Border outposts near the border with Turkmenistan.

=== Other villages in the rural district ===
- Abbasabad
- Aminabad
- Eslamabad-e Bala
- Eslamabad-e Pain
- Gug Tappeh-ye Do
- Gug Tappeh-ye Yek
- Habib Ishan
- Mohammadabad-e Bala
- Mohammadabad-e Pain
- Qasemabad-e Yolmeh Salian
- Sad-e Gorgan
- Sazeman-e Enqelab
- Shahrak-e Vahdat-e Eslami
- Sheykhabad-e Yolmeh Salian
