= Karimabad, Gorgan =

Village in Golestan province, Iran

Karimabad Persian: كريم اباد
- Village
- Location within Iran
- Coordinates: 36°52′20″N 54°24′42″E
- Country: Iran
- Province: Golestan
- County: Gorgan
- District: Central
- Rural District: Anjirab

Population (2016)
  - Total: 3,005
- Time zone: UTC+3:30 (IRST)

Karimabad (Persian: كريم اباد) (Note: Also romanized as Karīmābād) is a village in Anjirab Rural District of the Central District in Gorgan County, Golestan province, Iran. The village is located just north of Gorgan's city limits, accessible via the Gorgan–Aq Qala road.

== Demographics ==
=== Population ===
At the time of the 2006 National Census, the village's population was 2,808 in 753 households. The following census in 2011 counted 2,990 people in 857 households. The 2016 census measured the population of the village as 3,005 people in 946 households.
