= Mazraeh-ye Jonubi Rural District =

Rural district in Golestan province, Iran

Mazraeh-ye Jonubi Rural District Persian: دهستان مزرعه جنوبي
- Rural District
- Location within Iran
- Coordinates: 37°08′N 54°29′E
- Country: Iran
- Province: Golestan
- County: Aqqala
- District: Voshmgir
- Established: 2000
- Capital: Chin Sebili

Population (2016)
  - Total: 7,681
- Time zone: UTC+3:30 (IRST)

Mazraeh-ye Jonubi Rural District (Persian: دهستان مزرعه جنوبي) is in Voshmgir District of Aqqala County, Golestan province, Iran. Its capital is the village of Chin Sebili.

== Demographics ==
=== Population ===
At the time of the 2006 National Census, the rural district's population was 5,891 in 1,287 households. There were 7,008 inhabitants in 1,842 households at the following census of 2011. The 2016 census measured the population of the rural district as 7,681 in 2,128 households. The most populous of its 11 villages was Chin Sebili, with 4,254 people.

=== Other villages in the rural district ===
- Aq Dagesh-e Olya
- Qaranjik-e Pur Aman
- Tazehabad
