= Sheykh Musa Rural District =

Rural district in Golestan province, Iran

Sheykh Musa Rural District Persian: دهستان شيخ موسي
- Rural District
- Location within Iran
- Coordinates: 37°06′N 54°45′E
- Country: Iran
- Province: Golestan
- County: Aqqala
- District: Central
- Established: 1987
- Capital: Geri Doveji

Population (2016)
  - Total: 15,651
- Time zone: UTC+3:30 (IRST)

Sheykh Musa Rural District (Persian: دهستان شيخ موسي) is in the Central District of Aqqala County, Golestan province, Iran. Its capital is the village of Geri Doveji.

== Demographics ==
=== Population ===
At the time of the 2006 National Census, the rural district's population was 12,909 in 2,621 households. There were 14,515 inhabitants in 3,757 households at the following census of 2011. The 2016 census measured the population of the rural district as 15,651 in 4,203 households. The most populous of its 16 villages was Geri Doveji, with 2,826 people.

=== Other villages in the rural district ===
- Badraq-e Molla
- Bagh-e Sheykh Musa
- Bagh-e Yolmeh Salian
- Bahalkeh-ye Bayram Akhund
- Bahalkeh-ye Dashli
- Bahalkeh-ye Sheykh Musa
- Jamaran
- Khivali
- Nosratabad
- Qarah Daghli
- Sakhiabad
- Sazeman-e Heydari
- Sazeman-e Shakrian
- Tappeh-ye Zohurian
- Uch Tappeh
