= Qarah Jelu =

Qarah Jelu قراجه لو
- Village
- Location within Iran
- Coordinates: 38°24′58″N 47°15′43″E
- Country: Iran
- Province: East Azerbaijan
- County: Ahar
- Bakhsh: Central
- Rural District: Qeshlaq

Population (2006)
  - Total: 146
- Time zone: UTC+3:30 (IRST)
  - Summer (DST): UTC+4:30 (IRDT)

Qarah Jelu (Persian: قراجه لو, also Romanized as Qarah Jelū and Qarājehlū) is a village in Qeshlaq Rural District, in the Central District of Ahar County, East Azerbaijan Province, Iran. At the 2006 census, its population was 146, in 30 families.
