= Anbar Olum =

City in Golestan province, Iran

Anbar Olum Persian: انبارآلوم
- City
- Location within Iran
- Coordinates: 37°07′59″N 54°37′16″E
- Country: Iran
- Province: Golestan
- County: Aqqala
- District: Voshmgir
- Established as a city: 2001

Population (2016)
  - Total: 7,003
- Time zone: UTC+3:30 (IRST)

Anbar Olum (Persian: انبارآلوم) (Note: Also romanized as Anbār Olūm; also known as Anbār Olom) is a city in, and the capital of, Voshmgir District of Aqqala County, Golestan province, Iran. It also serves as the administrative center for Mazraeh-ye Shomali Rural District. (Note: Formerly Mazraeh Rural District) The village of Anbar Olum was converted to a city in 2001.

== Demographics ==
=== Population ===
At the time of the 2006 National Census, the city's population was 5,859 in 1,247 households. The following census in 2011 counted 6,540 people in 1,660 households. The 2016 census measured the population of the city as 7,003 people in 1,960 households.
