= Aqqala =

City in Golestan province, Iran

Aqqala Persian: آق‌قلا
- City
- Location within Iran
- Coordinates: 37°00′50″N 54°27′25″E
- Country: Iran
- Province: Golestan
- County: Aqqala
- District: Central

Population (2016)
  - Total: 35,116
- Time zone: UTC+3:30 (IRST)

Aqqala (Persian: آق قلا) (Note: Also romanized as Āq Qalā; also known as Akgala and Ākgalā) is a city in the Central District of Aqqala County, Golestan province, Iran, serving as capital of both the county and the district.

== Demographics ==
=== Population ===
At the time of the 2006 National Census, the city's population was 27,402 in 5,811 households. The following census in 2011 counted 31,626 people in 8,062 households. The 2016 census measured the population of the city as 35,116 people in 9,498 households.
