= Gomish Tappeh =

City in Golestan province, Iran

Gomish Tappeh Persian: گمیش تپه
- City
- Location within Iran
- Coordinates: 37°04′12″N 54°04′37″E
- Country: Iran
- Province: Golestan
- County: Gomishan
- District: Central

Population (2016)
  - Total: 19,191
- Time zone: UTC+3:30 (IRST)

Gomish Tappeh (Persian: گمیش تپه) (Note: Also romanized as Gomīsh Tappeh and Gomish Tepe; also known as Gomesh Tappeh, Gomishan, Gomīshān (گميشان), Gumish Tepe, and Gumshān; also formerly known as Gomish Tepe Jik (گُمیش‌تپه جیک), also romanized as Gomīsh Tappeh Jīk; and Turkmen: Kümüş Depe) is a city in the Central District of Gomishan County, Golestan province, Iran, serving as capital of both the county and the district. The city's Turkmen name, Kümüş Depe, means "Silver Hill."

== Demographics ==
=== Population ===
At the time of the 2006 National Census, the city's population was 15,639 in 3,236 households, when it was capital of the former Gomishan District in Torkaman County. The following census in 2011 counted 17,648 people in 4,078 households, by which time the district had been separated from the county in the establishment of Gomishan County. Gomishan was transferred to the new Central District as the county's capital. The 2016 census measured the population of the city as 19,191 people in 5,129 households.
