= Jafarbay-ye Gharbi Rural District =

Rural district in Golestan province, Iran

Jafarbay-ye Gharbi Rural District Persian: دهستان جعفربای غربی
- Rural District
- Location within Iran
- Coordinates: 37°01′N 54°04′E
- Country: Iran
- Province: Golestan
- County: Gomishan
- District: Central
- Established: 1986
- Capital: Khaje Nafas

Population (2016)
  - Total: 11,819
- Time zone: UTC+3:30 (IRST)

Jafarbay-ye Gharbi Rural District (Persian: دهستان جعفربای غربی) is in the Central District of Gomishan County, Golestan province, Iran. Its capital is the village of Khaje Nafas.

== Demographics ==
=== Population ===
At the time of the 2006 National Census, the rural district's population (as a part of the former Gomishan District in Torkaman County) was 13,650 in 2,652 households. There were 11,382 inhabitants in 2,626 households at the following census of 2011, by which time the district had been separated from the county in the establishment of Gomishan County. The rural district was transferred to the new Central District. The 2016 census measured the population of the rural district as 11,819 in 3,306 households. The most populous of its seven villages was Khaje Nafas, with 5,129 people.

=== Other villages in the rural district ===
- Charqoli
- Dahaneh
- Gamishli-ye Khvajeh Nafas
- Qarah Kileh
- Qarmaseh
- Tumachlar-e Charqoli
