= Jafarbay-ye Sharqi Rural District =

Rural district in Golestan province, Iran

Jafarbay-ye Sharqi Rural District Persian: دهستان جعفربای شرقی
- Rural District
- Location within Iran
- Coordinates: 37°09′N 54°17′E
- Country: Iran
- Province: Golestan
- County: Gomishan
- District: Goldasht
- Established: 1986
- Capital: Basirabad

Population (2016)
  - Total: 6,605
- Time zone: UTC+3:30 (IRST)

Jafarbay-ye Sharqi Rural District (Persian: دهستان جعفربای شرقی) is in Goldasht District of Gomishan County, Golestan province, Iran. Its capital is the village of Basirabad. The previous capital of the rural district was the village of Bonavar until it merged with two other villages to form the city of Siminshahr, which became the administrative center for the rural district.

== Demographics ==
=== Population ===
At the time of the 2006 National Census, the rural district's population (as a part of the former Gomishan District in Torkaman County) was 15,891 in 3,178 households. There were 6,013 inhabitants in 1,340 households at the following census of 2011, by which time the district had been separated from the county in the establishment of Gomishan County. The rural district was transferred to the new Goldasht District. The 2016 census measured the population of the rural district as 6,605 in 1,695 households. The most populous of its seven villages was Basirabad, with 3,259 people.

=== Other villages in the rural district ===
- Ghaffar Hajji
- Kamlar
- Kowslar
- Moradberdi
- Saqar Tappeh
- Tumachlar-e Altin
