= Central District (Gomishan County) =

District in Golestan province, Iran

Central District (Gomishan County) Persian: بخش مرکزی شهرستان گمیشان
- District
- Location within Iran
- Coordinates: 37°09′N 54°06′E
- Country: Iran
- Province: Golestan
- County: Gomishan
- Established: 2009
- Capital: Gomish Tappeh

Population (2016)
  - Total: 34,751
- Time zone: UTC+3:30 (IRST)

The Central District of Gomishan County (Persian: بخش مرکزی شهرستان گمیشان) is in Golestan province, Iran. Its capital is the city of Gomish Tappeh.

== History ==
In 2009, Gomishan District was separated from Torkaman County in the establishment of Gomishan County, which was divided into two districts of two rural districts each, with Gomish Tappeh as its capital.

== Demographics ==
=== Population ===
At the time of the 2011 census, the district's population was 32,547 people in 7,527 households. The 2016 census measured the population of the district as 34,751 inhabitants in 9,448 households.

=== Administrative divisions ===
Central District (Gomishan County) Population
Administrative Divisions	2011	2016
Jafarbay-ye Gharbi RD	11,382	11,819
Neftelijeh RD	3,517	3,741
Gomish Tappeh (city)	17,648	19,191
Total	32,547	34,751
RD = Rural District
