= Goldasht District =

District in Golestan province, Iran

Goldasht District Persian: بخش گلدشت
- District
- Location within Iran
- Coordinates: 37°08′N 54°18′E
- Country: Iran
- Province: Golestan
- County: Gomishan
- Established: 2009
- Capital: Siminshahr

Population (2016)
  - Total: 34,021
- Time zone: UTC+3:30 (IRST)

Goldasht District (Persian: بخش گلدشت) is in Gomishan County, Golestan province, Iran. Its capital is the city of Siminshahr.

== History ==
In 2009, Gomishan District was separated from Torkaman County in the establishment of Gomishan County, which was divided into two districts of two rural districts each, with the city of Gomish Tappeh as its capital.

== Demographics ==
=== Population ===
At the time of the 2011 census, the district's population was 30,900 people in 7,150 households. The 2016 census measured the population of the district as 34,021 inhabitants in 9,025 households.

=== Administrative divisions ===
Goldasht District Population
Administrative Divisions	2011	2016
Jafarbay-ye Sharqi RD	6,013	6,605
Qezel Alan RD	9,348	10,211
Siminshahr (city) (Note: Merger of three villages)	15,539	17,205
Total	30,900	34,021
RD = Rural District
