= Voshmgir District =

District in Golestan province, Iran

Voshmgir District Persian: بخش وشمگیر
- District
- Location within Iran
- Coordinates: 37°15′N 54°30′E
- Country: Iran
- Province: Golestan
- County: Aqqala
- Established: 2000
- Capital: Anbar Olum

Population (2016)
  - Total: 30,745
- Time zone: UTC+3:30 (IRST)

Voshmgir District (Persian: بخش وشمگیر) is in Aqqala County, Golestan province, Iran. Its capital is the city of Anbar Olum.

== Demographics ==
=== Population ===
At the time of the 2006 National Census, the district's population was 25,149 in 5,266 households. The following census in 2011 counted 29,241 people in 7,439 households. The 2016 census measured the population of the district as 30,745 inhabitants in 8,388 households.

=== Administrative divisions ===
Voshmgir District Population
Administrative Divisions	2006	2011	2016
Mazraeh-ye Jonubi RD	5,891	7,008	7,681
Mazraeh-ye Shomali RD (Note: Formerly Mazraeh Rural District)	13,399	15,693	16,061
Anbar Olum (city)	5,859	6,540	7,003
Total	25,149	29,241	30,745
RD = Rural District
