= Gomishan County =

County in Golestan Province, Iran

Gomishan County Persian: شهرستان گمیشان
- County
- Location of Gomishan County in Golestan province (left, purple)

- Location of Golestan province in Iran
- Coordinates: 37°09′N 54°11′E
- Country: Iran
- Province: Golestan
- Established: 2009
- Capital: Gomish Tappeh
- Districts: Central, Goldasht

Population (2016)
  - Total: 68,773
- Time zone: UTC+3:30 (IRST)

Gomishan County (Persian: شهرستان گمیشان) is in Golestan Province, Iran. Its capital is the city of Gomish Tappeh.

== History ==
In 2009, Gomishan District was separated from Torkaman County in the establishment of Gomishan County, which was divided into two districts of two rural districts each, with Gomish Tappeh as its capital.

== Demographics ==
=== Population ===
At the time of the 2011 National Census, the county's population was 63,447 people in 14,645 households. The 2016 census measured the population of the county as 68,773 in 18,474 households.

=== Administrative divisions ===
Gomishan County's population history and administrative structure over two consecutive censuses are shown in the following table.

Gomishan County Population
Administrative Divisions	2011	2016
Central District	32,547	34,751
Jafarbay-ye Gharbi RD	11,382	11,819
Neftelijeh RD	3,517	3,741
Gomish Tappeh (city)	17,648	19,191
Goldasht District	30,900	34,021
Jafarbay-ye Sharqi RD	6,013	6,605
Qezel Alan RD	9,348	10,211
Siminshahr (city) (Note: Merger of three villages)	15,539	17,205
Total	63,447	68,773
RD = Rural District

== See also ==
Media related to Gomishan County at Wikimedia Commons
