= Gomishan District =

Former district in Golestan province, Iran

Gomishan District Persian: بخش گمیشان
- Former District
- Location within Iran
- Coordinates: 37°09′N 54°11′E
- Country: Iran
- Province: Golestan
- County: Torkaman
- Capital: Gomish Tappeh

Population (2006)
  - Total: 58,725
- Time zone: UTC+3:30 (IRST)

Gomishan District (Persian: بخش گمیشان) is a former administrative division of Torkaman County, Golestan province, Iran. Its capital was the city of Gomish Tappeh.

== History ==
In 2009, the district was separated from the county in the establishment of Gomishan County.

== Demographics ==
=== Population ===
At the time of the 2006 National Census, the district's population was 58,725 in 11,828 households.

=== Administrative divisions ===
Gomishan District Population
Administrative Divisions	2006
Jafarbay-ye Gharbi RD	13,650
Jafarbay-ye Sharqi RD	15,891
Gomish Tappeh (city)	15,639
Siminshahr (city) (Note: Merger of three villages)	13,545
Total	58,725
RD = Rural District
