= Central District (Aqqala County) =

District in Golestan province, Iran

Central District (Aqqala County) Persian: بخش مرکزی شهرستان آق‌قلا
- District
- Location within Iran
- Coordinates: 37°03′N 54°36′E
- Country: Iran
- Province: Golestan
- County: Aqqala
- Established: 2000
- Capital: Aqqala

Population (2016)
  - Total: 101,988
- Time zone: UTC+3:30 (IRST)

The Central District of Aqqala County (Persian: بخش مرکزی شهرستان آق‌قلا) is in Golestan province, Iran. Its capital is the city of Aqqala.

== Demographics ==
=== Population ===
At the time of the 2006 National Census, the district's population was 84,291 in 17,538 households. The following census in 2011 counted 94,944 people in 24,389 households. The 2016 census measured the population of the district as 101,988 inhabitants in 27,601 households.

=== Administrative divisions ===
Central District (Aqqala County) Population
Administrative Divisions	2006	2011	2016
Aq Altin RD	19,030	21,460	22,020
Gorganbuy RD	24,950	27,343	29,201
Sheykh Musa RD	12,909	14,515	15,651
Aqqala (city)	27,402	31,626	35,116
Total	84,291	94,944	101,988
RD = Rural District
