= Aqqala County =

County in Golestan province, Iran

Aqqala County Persian: شهرستان آق‌قلا
- County
- Mud volcano in Aqqala County

- Location of Aqqala County in Golestan Province (center left, green)

- Location of Golestan Province in Iran
- Coordinates: 37°12′N 54°34′E
- Country: Iran
- Province: Golestan
- Established: 2000
- Capital: Aqqala
- Districts: Central, Voshmgir

Population (2016)
  - Total: 132,733
- Time zone: UTC+3:30 (IRST)

Aqqala County (Persian: شهرستان آق‌قلا) is in Golestan Province, Iran. Its capital is the city of Aqqala.

== Demographics ==
=== Population ===
At the time of the 2006 National Census, the county's population was 109,440 in 22,804 households. The following census in 2011 counted 124,185 people in 31,817 households. The 2016 census measured the population of the county as 132,733 in 35,989 households.

=== Administrative divisions ===
Aqqala County's population history and administrative structure over three consecutive censuses are shown in the following table.

Aqqala County Population
Administrative Divisions	2006	2011	2016
Central District	84,291	94,944	101,988
Aq Altin RD	19,030	21,460	22,020
Gorganbuy RD	24,950	27,343	29,201
Sheykh Musa RD	12,909	14,515	15,651
Aqqala (city)	27,402	31,626	35,116
Voshmgir District	25,149	29,241	30,745
Mazraeh-ye Jonubi RD	5,891	7,008	7,681
Mazraeh-ye Shomali RD (Note: Formerly Mazraeh Rural District)	13,399	15,693	16,061
Anbar Olum (city)	5,859	6,540	7,003
Total	109,440	124,185	132,733
RD = Rural District

== See also ==
Media related to Aqqala County at Wikimedia Commons
