= Sistani =

Sistani may refer to:

- Ali al-Sistani, a Shi'ite scholar and cleric
- Sistan, a historical and geographical region in eastern Iran
- Sistani (surname)
- Sistani Persians, who mainly inhabit Iran, Afghanistan and Pakistan
- Sistani dialect
- Sistani Mahalleh, a village in Iran
- Tolombeh-ye Habib Sistani, a village in Iran
- Vahdapar va Arbandi Sistani, a village in Iran
