= Zangian, Golestan =

Village in Golestan province, Iran

Zangian Persian: زنگيان
- Village
- Location within Iran
- Coordinates: 36°51′22″N 54°23′56″E
- Country: Iran
- Province: Golestan
- County: Gorgan
- District: Central
- Rural District: Anjirab

Population (2016)
  - Total: 4,557
- Time zone: UTC+3:30 (IRST)

Zangian (Persian: زنگيان) (Note: Also romanized as Zangīān and Zangiyan; also known as Zangeneh Maḩalleh and Zangī Maḩallēh) is a village in, and the capital of, Anjirab Rural District in the Central District of Gorgan County, Golestan province, Iran. It is suburb northwest of Gorgan city.

== Demographics ==
=== Population ===
At the time of the 2006 National Census, the village's population was 3,810 in 950 households. The following census in 2011 counted 4,354 people in 1,230 households. The 2016 census measured the population of the village as 4,557 people in 1,378 households.
