= Nahar Khoran =

Village in Golestan province, Iran

Nahar Khoran Persian: ناهارخوران
- Village
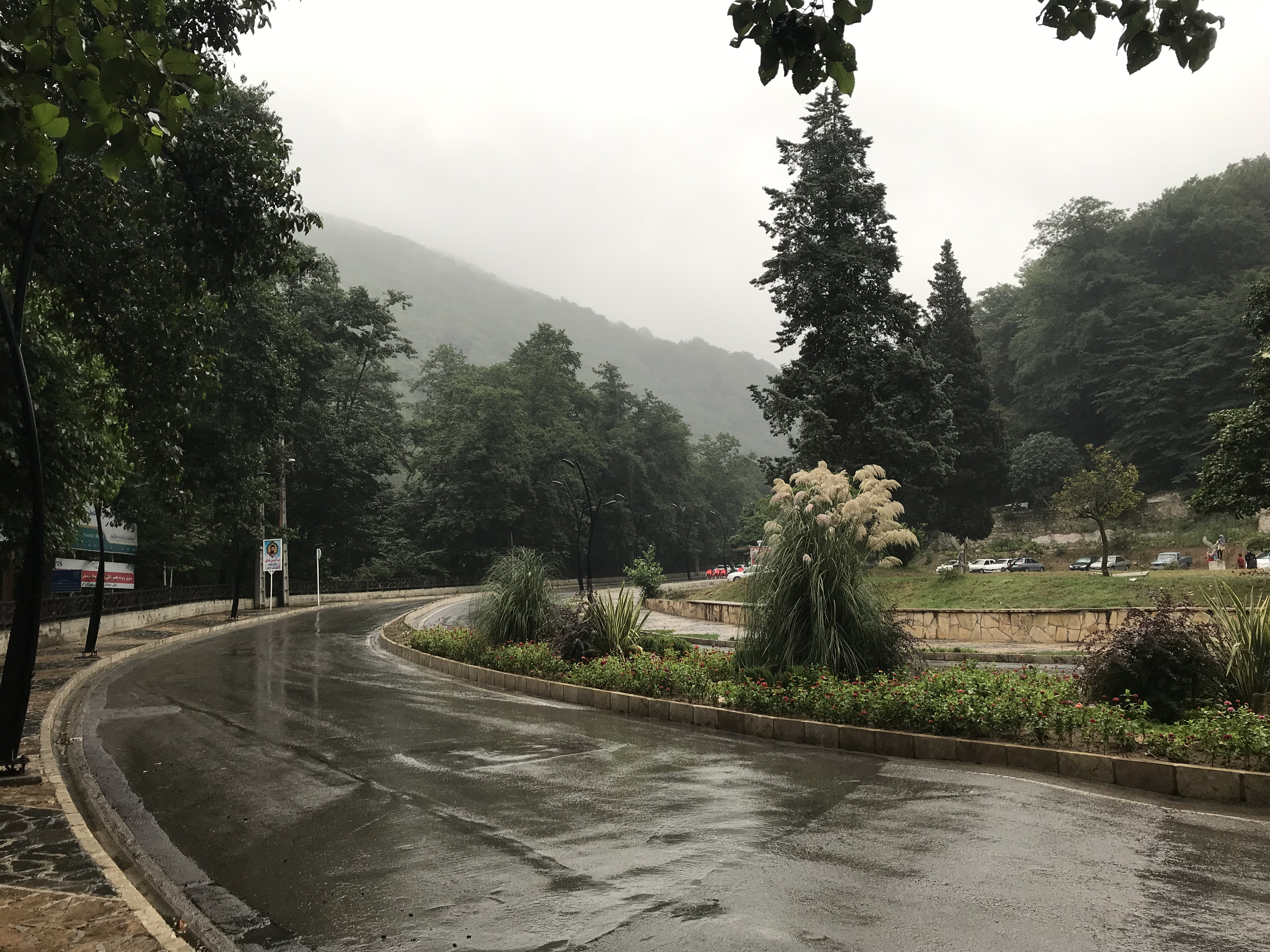

- Location within Iran
- Coordinates: 36°46′44″N 54°27′46″E
- Country: Iran
- Province: Golestan
- County: Gorgan
- District: Central
- Rural District: Estarabad-e Jonubi

Population (2016)
  - Total: 32
- Time zone: UTC+3:30 (IRST)

Nahar Khoran (Persian: ناهارخوران) (Note: Also romanized as Nahār Khorān and Nahār Khvorān) is a village in Estarabad-e Jonubi Rural District of the Central District in Gorgan County, Golestan province, Iran.

== Demographics ==
=== Population ===
At the time of the 2006 National Census, the village's population was 71 in 22 households. The following census in 2011 counted 65 people in 11 households. The 2016 census measured the population of the village as 32 people in 11 households.

== Gallery ==
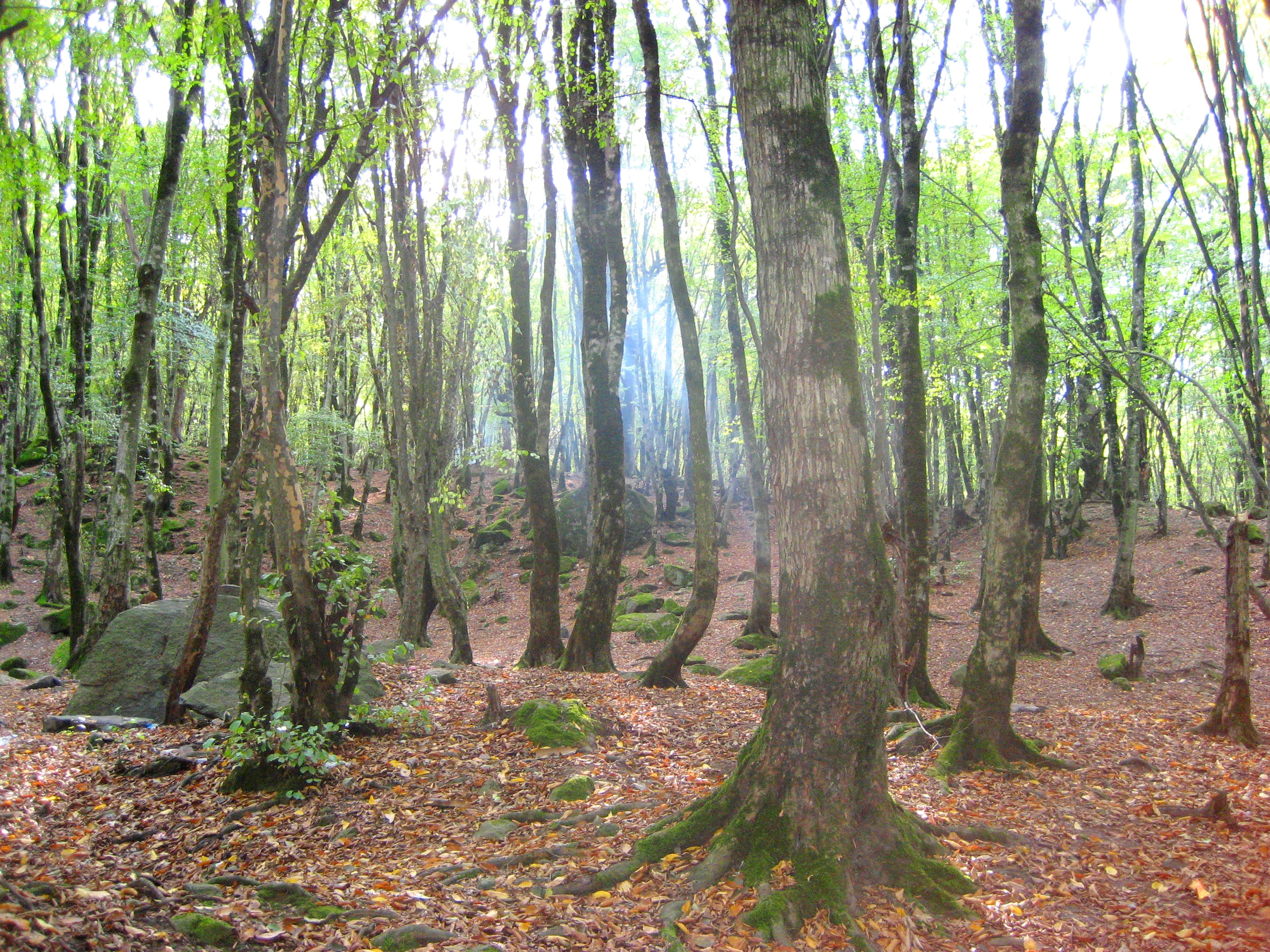
Alangdare forest

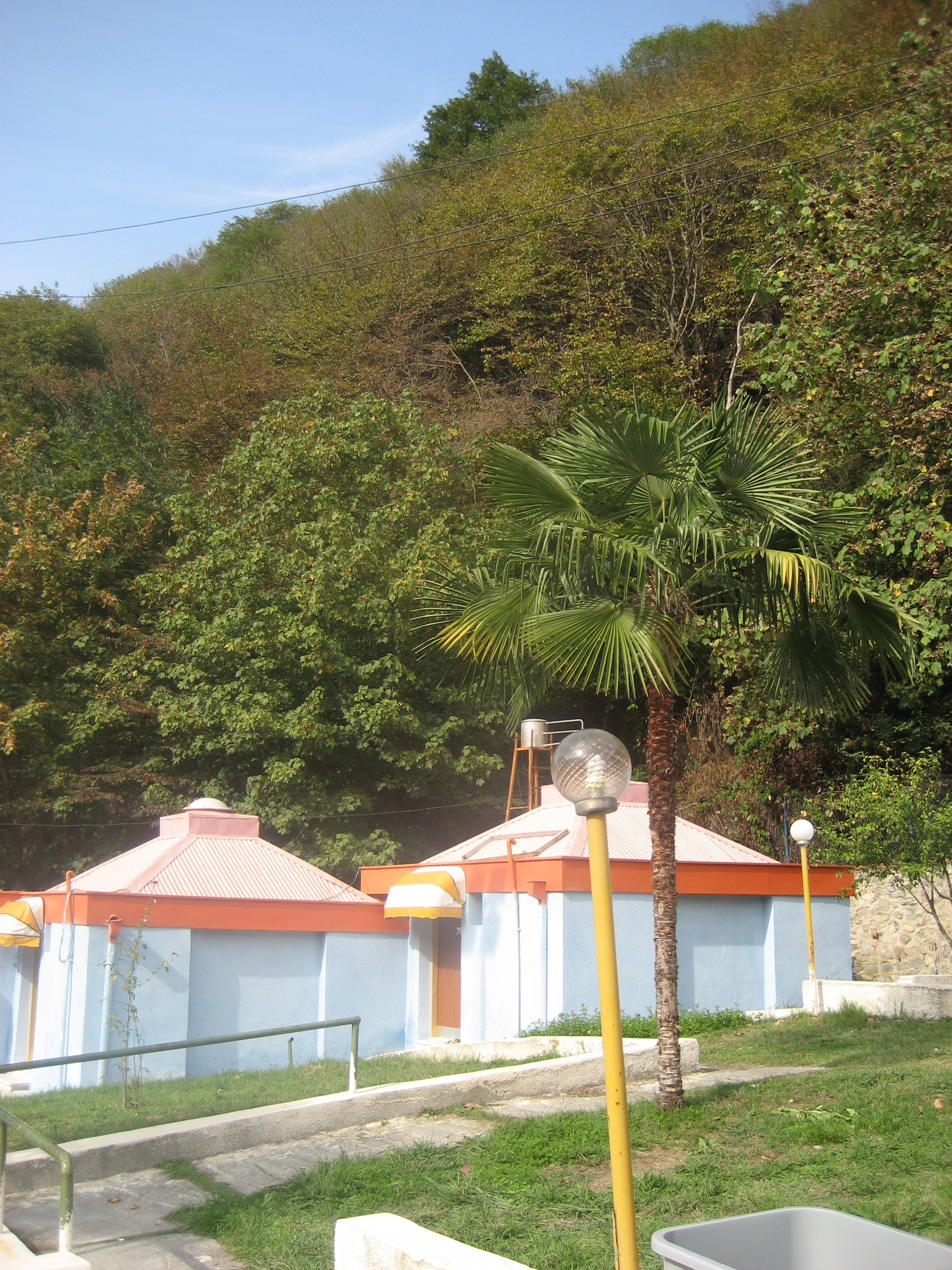

== See also ==
Media related to Naharkhoran at Wikimedia Commons
