= Tuskastan =

Village in Golestan province, Iran

Tuskastan Persian: توسكاستان
- Village
- Location within Iran
- Coordinates: 36°46′52″N 54°35′00″E
- Country: Iran
- Province: Golestan
- County: Gorgan
- District: Central
- Rural District: Estarabad-e Jonubi

Population (2016)
  - Total: 182
- Time zone: UTC+3:30 (IRST)

Tuskastan (Persian: توسكاستان) (Note: Also romanized as Tūskāstān and Tūskestān; also known as Toskāstān) is a village in Estarabad-e Jonubi Rural District of the Central District in Gorgan County, Golestan province, Iran.

== Demographics ==
=== Population ===
At the time of the 2006 National Census, the village's population was 244 in 61 households. The following census in 2011 counted 187 people in 49 households. The 2016 census measured the population of the village as 182 people in 56 households.
