= Now Chaman =

Village in Golestan province, Iran

Now Chaman Persian: نوچمن
- Village
- Location within Iran
- Coordinates: 36°45′55″N 54°18′19″E
- Country: Iran
- Province: Golestan
- County: Gorgan
- District: Central
- Rural District: Rushanabad

Population (2016)
  - Total: 913
- Time zone: UTC+3:30 (IRST)

Now Chaman (Persian: نوچمن) is a village in Rushanabad Rural District of the Central District in Gorgan County, Golestan province, Iran.

== Demographics ==
=== Population ===
At the time of the 2006 National Census, the village's population was 1,000 in 213 households. The following census in 2011 counted 1,054 people in 277 households. The 2016 census measured the population of the village as 913 people in 273 households.
