= Esbu Mahalleh =

Village in Golestan province, Iran

Esbu Mahalleh Persian: اسبومحله
- Village
- Location within Iran
- Coordinates: 36°48′05″N 54°17′40″E
- Country: Iran
- Province: Golestan
- County: Gorgan
- District: Central
- Rural District: Rushanabad

Population (2016)
  - Total: 1,241
- Time zone: UTC+3:30 (IRST)

Esbu Mahalleh (Persian: اسبومحله) (Note: Also romanized as Esbū Maḩalleh; also known as Espū Maḩalleh) is a village in Rushanabad Rural District of the Central District in Gorgan County, Golestan province, Iran.

== Demographics ==
=== Population ===
At the time of the 2006 National Census, the village's population was 1,651 in 459 households. The following census in 2011 counted 1,339 people in 408 households. The 2016 census measured the population of the village as 1,241 people in 408 households.
