= Ziarat, Golestan =

Village in Golestan province, Iran

Ziarat Persian: زیارت
- Village
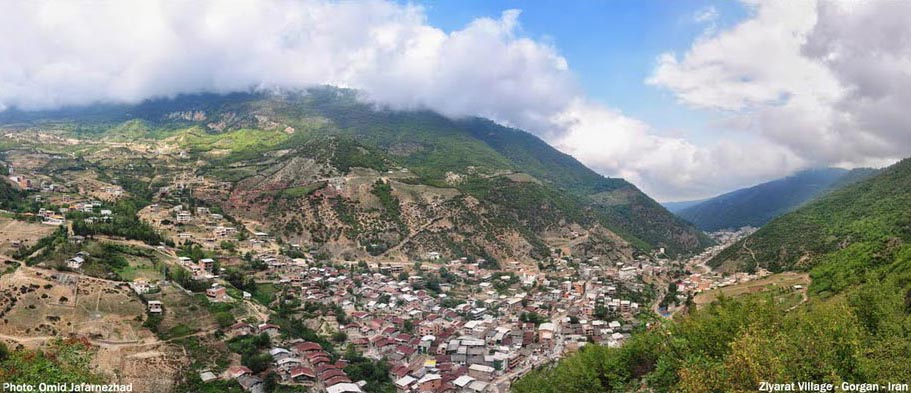
- The village of Ziarat

- Location within Iran
- Coordinates: 36°42′21″N 54°28′41″E
- Country: Iran
- Province: Golestan
- County: Gorgan
- District: Central
- Rural District: Estarabad-e Jonubi

Population (2016)
  - Total: 2,280
- Time zone: UTC+3:30 (IRST)

Ziarat (Persian: زیارت) (Note: Also romanized as Zīārat; also known as Zeyārat-e Khāşeh Rūd, Ziār, Zīārat-e Khāşeh Rūd, Zīārat-e Khāsteh Rūd, and Zīyārat Khāseh Rūd) is a village in Estarabad-e Jonubi Rural District of the Central District in Gorgan County, Golestan province, Iran.

== Demographics ==
=== Population ===
At the time of the 2006 National Census, the village's population was 1,964 in 478 households. The following census in 2011 counted 1,958 people in 586 households. The 2016 census measured the population of the village as 2,280 people in 730 households.

== Overview ==
Ziarat is about 8 km south of the city of Gorgan. The Arabic word ziyāra (زيارة), meaning "visit," is used in Persian to refer to (pilgrimage to) a holy place.

Ziarat lies in a valley inside the eastern part of the Caspian Hyrcanian rain forests at an altitude of 1,563 meters above sea level. There are three mosques in the village and near the shrine is a hot spring that feeds a public bath before joining the valley river. Some of the surrounding hills are grazed by sheep, goats and cattle. South of the village, at the end of a dirt road, is a waterfall that is a popular tourist attraction.

== See also ==
Media related to Ziarat, Golestan at Wikimedia Commons
