= Qalandar Mahalleh =

Village in Golestan province, Iran

Qalandar Mahalleh Persian: قلندرمحله
- Village
- Location within Iran
- Coordinates: 36°51′45″N 54°20′03″E
- Country: Iran
- Province: Golestan
- County: Gorgan
- District: Central
- Rural District: Rushanabad

Population (2016)
  - Total: 618
- Time zone: UTC+3:30 (IRST)

Qalandar Mahalleh (Persian: قلندرمحله) (Note: Also romanized as Qalandar Maḩalleh) is a village in Rushanabad Rural District of the Central District in Gorgan County, Golestan province, Iran.

== Demographics ==
=== Population ===
At the time of the 2006 National Census, the village's population was 622 in 164 households. The following census in 2011 counted 653 people in 201 households. The 2016 census measured the population of the village as 618 people in 196 households.
