= Fakhrabad va Golnad Tariki =

Village in Golestan province, Iran

Fakhrabad va Golnad Tariki Persian: فخرابادوگلندتاريكي
- Village
- Location within Iran
- Coordinates: 36°49′15″N 54°25′10″E
- Country: Iran
- Province: Golestan
- County: Gorgan
- District: Central
- Rural District: Anjirab

Population (2016)
  - Total: 2,189
- Time zone: UTC+3:30 (IRST)

Fakhrabad va Golnad Tariki (Persian: فخرابادوگلندتاريكي) (Note: Also romanized as Fakhrābād va Golnad Tārīḵī; also known as Fakhrābād) is a village in Anjirab Rural District of the Central District in Gorgan County, Golestan province, Iran. The village is located just southwest of Gorgan's city limits.

== Demographics ==
=== Population ===
At the time of the 2006 National Census, the village's population was 1,395 in 325 households. The following census in 2011 counted 1,907 people in 489 households. The 2016 census measured the population of the village as 2,189 people in 570 households.
