= Hashemabad, Golestan =

Village in Golestan province, Iran

Hashemabad Persian: هاشم اباد
- Village
- Location within Iran
- Coordinates: 36°53′28″N 54°20′46″E
- Country: Iran
- Province: Golestan
- County: Gorgan
- District: Central
- Rural District: Rushanabad

Population (2016)
  - Total: 2,666
- Time zone: UTC+3:30 (IRST)

Hashemabad (Persian: هاشم اباد) (Note: Also romanized as Hāshemābād) is a village in Rushanabad Rural District of the Central District in Gorgan County, Golestan province, Iran.

== Demographics ==
=== Population ===
At the time of the 2006 National Census, the village's population was 2,440 in 576 households. The following census in 2011 counted 2,695 people in 737 households. The 2016 census measured the population of the village as 2,666 people in 799 households.
