= Fateh Bagh =

Village in Golestan province, Iran

Fateh Bagh Persian: فته باغ
- Village
- Location within Iran
- Coordinates: 36°50′59″N 54°22′00″E
- Country: Iran
- Province: Golestan
- County: Gorgan
- District: Central
- Rural District: Anjirab

Population (2016)
  - Total: 157
- Time zone: UTC+3:30 (IRST)

Fateh Bagh (Persian: فته باغ) (Note: Also romanized as Fateh Bāgh; also known as Fath Bagh, Fatḩ Bāgh, and Patbāgh) is a village in Anjirab Rural District of the Central District in Gorgan County, Golestan province, Iran.

== Demographics ==
=== Population ===
At the time of the 2006 National Census, the village's population was 121 in 31 households. The following census in 2011 counted 128 people in 39 households. The 2016 census measured the population of the village as 157 people in 52 households.
