= Heydarabad, Gorgan =

Village in Golestan province, Iran

Heydarabad Persian: حيدراباد
- Village
- Location within Iran
- Coordinates: 36°51′27″N 54°17′03″E
- Country: Iran
- Province: Golestan
- County: Gorgan
- District: Central
- Rural District: Rushanabad

Population (2016)
  - Total: 1,597
- Time zone: UTC+3:30 (IRST)

Heydarabad (Persian: حيدراباد) (Note: Also romanized as Ḩeydarābād) is a village in Rushanabad Rural District of the Central District in Gorgan County, Golestan province, Iran.

== Demographics ==
=== Population ===
At the time of the 2006 National Census, the village's population was 1,629 in 418 households. The following census in 2011 counted 1,604 people in 477 households. The 2016 census measured the population of the village as 1,597 people in 514 households.
