= Laldevin =

Village in Golestan province, Iran

Laldevin Persian: للدوين
- Village
- Location within Iran
- Coordinates: 36°52′21″N 54°18′53″E
- Country: Iran
- Province: Golestan
- County: Gorgan
- District: Central
- Rural District: Rushanabad

Population (2016)
  - Total: 495
- Time zone: UTC+3:30 (IRST)

Laldevin (Persian: للدوين) (Note: Also romanized as Laldevīn; also known as La‘ledbīn) is a village in Rushanabad Rural District of the Central District in Gorgan County, Golestan province, Iran.

== Demographics ==
=== Population ===
At the time of the 2006 National Census, the village's population was 557 in 131 households. The following census in 2011 counted 528 people in 157 households. The 2016 census measured the population of the village as 495 people in 153 households.
