= Seyyed Miran =

Village in Golestan province, Iran

Seyyed Miran Persian: سيدميران
- Village
- Location within Iran
- Coordinates: 36°47′40″N 54°19′55″E
- Country: Iran
- Province: Golestan
- County: Gorgan
- District: Central
- Rural District: Rushanabad

Population (2016)
  - Total: 2,437
- Time zone: UTC+3:30 (IRST)

Seyyed Miran (Persian: سيدميران) (Note: Also romanized as Seyyed Mīrān; also known as Saiyid Mirān) is a village in Rushanabad Rural District of the Central District in Gorgan County, Golestan province, Iran.

== Demographics ==
=== Population ===
At the time of the 2006 National Census, the village's population was 2,420 in 615 households. The following census in 2011 counted 2,599 people in 716 households. The 2016 census measured the population of the village as 2,437 people in 777 households.
