= Dar Asiab =

Village in Golestan province, Iran

Dar Asiab Persian: دراسياب
- Village
- Location within Iran
- Country: Iran
- Province: Golestan
- County: Gorgan
- District: Central
- Rural District: Estarabad-e Jonubi

Population (2016)
  - Total: 35
- Time zone: UTC+3:30 (IRST)

Dar Asiab (Persian: دراسياب) (Note: Also romanized as Dar Āsīāb; also known as Do Āsīāb) is a village in Estarabad-e Jonubi Rural District of the Central District in Gorgan County, Golestan province, Iran.

== Demographics ==
=== Population ===
At the time of the 2006 National Census, the village's population was 214 in 78 households. The following census in 2011 counted 81 people in 21 households. The 2016 census measured the population of the village as 35 people in 11 households.
