= Do Dangeh, Golestan =

Village in Golestan province, Iran

Do Dangeh Persian: دودانگه
- Village
- Location within Iran
- Coordinates: 36°50′45″N 54°34′17″E
- Country: Iran
- Province: Golestan
- County: Gorgan
- District: Central
- Rural District: Estarabad-e Jonubi

Population (2016)
  - Total: 604
- Time zone: UTC+3:30 (IRST)

Do Dangeh (Persian: دودانگه) (Note: Also romanized as Do Dāngeh) is a village in Estarabad-e Jonubi Rural District of the Central District in Gorgan County, Golestan province, Iran.

== Demographics ==
=== Population ===
At the time of the 2006 National Census, the village's population was 778 in 210 households. The following census in 2011 counted 682 people in 214 households. The 2016 census measured the population of the village as 604 people in 210 households.
