= Sadan, Iran =

Village in Golestan province, Iran

Sadan Persian: سدن
- Village
- Location within Iran
- Coordinates: 36°48′19″N 54°19′29″E
- Country: Iran
- Province: Golestan
- County: Gorgan
- District: Central
- Rural District: Rushanabad

Population (2016)
  - Total: 539
- Time zone: UTC+3:30 (IRST)

Sadan (Persian: سدن) is a village in Rushanabad Rural District of the Central District in Gorgan County, Golestan province, Iran.

== Demographics ==
=== Population ===
At the time of the 2006 National Census, the village's population was 576 in 146 households. The following census in 2011 counted 623 people in 174 households. The 2016 census measured the population of the village as 539 people in 178 households.
