= Bagh-e Golbon =

Village in Golestan province, Iran

Bagh-e Golbon Persian: باغ گلبن
- Village
- Location within Iran
- Coordinates: 36°48′23″N 54°29′46″E
- Country: Iran
- Province: Golestan
- County: Gorgan
- District: Central
- Rural District: Estarabad-e Jonubi

Population (2016)
  - Total: 892
- Time zone: UTC+3:30 (IRST)

Bagh-e Golbon (Persian: باغ گلبن) (Note: Also romanized as Bāgh-e Golbon) is a village in Estarabad-e Jonubi Rural District of the Central District in Gorgan County, Golestan province, Iran.

== Demographics ==
=== Population ===
At the time of the 2006 National Census, the village's population was 924 in 226 households. The following census in 2011 counted 972 people in 276 households. The 2016 census measured the population of the village as 892 people in 275 households.
