= Jelin =

Jelin (Persian: جلين) may refer to:

- Jelin-e Olya
- Jelin-e Sofla
