= Kheyrat =

Village in Golestan province, Iran

Kheyrat Persian: خيرات
- Village
- Location within Iran
- Coordinates: 36°47′42″N 54°34′15″E
- Country: Iran
- Province: Golestan
- County: Gorgan
- District: Central
- Rural District: Estarabad-e Jonubi

Population (2016)
  - Total: 377
- Time zone: UTC+3:30 (IRST)

Kheyrat (Persian: خيرات) (Note: Also romanized as Kheyrāt) is a village in Estarabad-e Jonubi Rural District of the Central District in Gorgan County, Golestan province, Iran.

== Demographics ==
=== Population ===
At the time of the 2006 National Census, the village's population was 348 in 84 households. The following census in 2011 counted 427 people in 120 households. The 2016 census measured the population of the village as 377 people in 104 households.
