= Siahtalu =

Village in Golestan province, Iran

Siahtalu Persian: سياهتلو
- Village
- Location within Iran
- Coordinates: 36°51′34″N 54°31′07″E
- Country: Iran
- Province: Golestan
- County: Gorgan
- District: Central
- Rural District: Estarabad-e Jonubi

Population (2016)
  - Total: 1,415
- Time zone: UTC+3:30 (IRST)

Siahtalu (Persian: سياهتلو) (Note: Also romanized as Sīāhtalū) is a village in Estarabad-e Jonubi Rural District of the Central District in Gorgan County, Golestan province, Iran.

== Demographics ==
=== Population ===
At the time of the 2006 National Census, the village's population was 1,506 in 335 households. The following census in 2011 counted 1,537 people in 390 households. The 2016 census measured the population of the village as 1,415 people in 418 households.
