= Maryamabad, Golestan =

Village in Golestan province, Iran

Maryamabad Persian: مريم آباد
- Village
- Location within Iran
- Coordinates: 36°52′11″N 54°28′24″E
- Country: Iran
- Province: Golestan
- County: Gorgan
- District: Central
- Rural District: Estarabad-e Jonubi

Population (2016)
  - Total: 984
- Time zone: UTC+3:30 (IRST)

Maryamabad (Persian: مريم آباد) (Note: Also romanized as Maryamābād) is a village in Estarabad-e Jonubi Rural District of the Central District in Gorgan County, Golestan province, Iran. The village is just northeast of Gorgan's city limits.

== Demographics ==
=== Population ===
At the time of the 2006 National Census, the village's population was 788 in 196 households. The following census in 2011 counted 918 people in 266 households. The 2016 census measured the population of the village as 984 people in 302 households.
