= Owja Bon =

Village in Golestan province, Iran

Owja Bon Persian: اوجابن
- Village
- Location within Iran
- Coordinates: 36°52′05″N 54°23′36″E
- Country: Iran
- Province: Golestan
- County: Gorgan
- District: Central
- Rural District: Anjirab

Population (2016)
  - Total: 725
- Time zone: UTC+3:30 (IRST)

Owja Bon (Persian: اوجابن) (Note: Also romanized as Owjā Bon and Ūjāben; also known as Ūhāben) is a village in Anjirab Rural District of the Central District in Gorgan County, Golestan province, Iran.

== Demographics ==
=== Population ===
At the time of the 2006 National Census, the village's population was 769 in 186 households. The following census in 2011 counted 756 people in 221 households. The 2016 census measured the population of the village as 725 people in 218 households.
