= Chahar Bagh, Golestan =

Village in Golestan province, Iran

Chahar Bagh Persian: چهارباغ
- Village
- Location within Iran
- Coordinates: 36°36′10″N 54°29′56″E
- Country: Iran
- Province: Golestan
- County: Gorgan
- District: Central
- Rural District: Estarabad-e Jonubi

Population (2016)
  - Total: 109
- Time zone: UTC+3:30 (IRST)

Chahar Bagh (Persian: چهارباغ) (Note: Also romanized as Chahār Bāgh) is a village in Estarabad-e Jonubi Rural District of the Central District in Gorgan County, Golestan province, Iran.

== Demographics ==
=== Population ===
At the time of the 2006 National Census, the village's population was 205 in 75 households. The following census in 2011 counted 63 people in 24 households. The 2016 census measured the population of the village as 109 people in 42 households.
