= Ebrahimabad, Gorgan =

Village in Golestan province, Iran

Ebrahimabad Persian: ابراهيم آباد
- Village
- Location within Iran
- Coordinates: 36°51′29″N 54°22′48″E
- Country: Iran
- Province: Golestan
- County: Gorgan
- District: Central
- Rural District: Anjirab

Population (2016)
  - Total: 159
- Time zone: UTC+3:30 (IRST)

Ebrahimabad (Persian: ابراهيم آباد) (Note: Also romanized as Ebrāhīmābād) is a village in Anjirab Rural District of the Central District in Gorgan County, Golestan province, Iran. The village is located just northwest of Gorgan's city limits, and next to the Tehran-Shomal railway.

== Demographics ==
=== Population ===
At the time of the 2006 National Census, the village's population was 180 in 46 households. The following census in 2011 counted 185 people in 52 households. The 2016 census measured the population of the village as 159 people in 50 households.
