= Yisi Mahalleh =

Village in Golestan province, Iran

Yisi Mahalleh Persian: عيسي محله
- Village
- Location within Iran
- Coordinates: 36°51′16″N 54°21′36″E
- Country: Iran
- Province: Golestan
- County: Gorgan
- District: Central
- Rural District: Rushanabad

Population (2016)
  - Total: 160
- Time zone: UTC+3:30 (IRST)

Yisi Mahalleh (Persian: عيسي محله) (Note: Also romanized as Yīsī Maḩalleh) is a village in Rushanabad Rural District of the Central District in Gorgan County, Golestan province, Iran.

== Demographics ==
=== Population ===
At the time of the 2006 National Census, the village's population was 129 in 35 households. The following census in 2011 counted 155 people in 46 households. The 2016 census measured the population of the village as 160 people in 50 households.
