= Ahangar Mahalleh, Gorgan =

Village in Golestan province, Iran

Ahangar Mahalleh Persian: آهنگرمحله
- Village
- Location within Iran
- Coordinates: 36°50′32″N 54°34′49″E
- Country: Iran
- Province: Golestan
- County: Gorgan
- District: Central
- Rural District: Estarabad-e Jonubi

Population (2016)
  - Total: 1,908
- Time zone: UTC+3:30 (IRST)

Ahangar Mahalleh (Persian: آهنگرمحله) (Note: Also romanized as Āhangar Maḩalleh) is a village in Estarabad-e Jonubi Rural District of the Central District in Gorgan County, Golestan province, Iran.

== Demographics ==
=== Population ===
At the time of the 2006 National Census, the village's population was 1,997 in 525 households. The following census in 2011 counted 2,036 people in 592 households. The 2016 census measured the population of the village as 1,908 people in 622 households.
