= Mohammadabad, Gorgan =

Village in Golestan province, Iran

Mohammadabad Persian: محمداباد
- Village
- Location within Iran
- Coordinates: 36°53′44″N 54°25′56″E
- Country: Iran
- Province: Golestan
- County: Gorgan
- District: Central
- Rural District: Anjirab

Population (2016)
  - Total: 5,192
- Time zone: UTC+3:30 (IRST)

Mohammadabad (Persian: محمداباد) (Note: Also romanized as Moḩammadābād) is a village in Anjirab Rural District of the Central District in Gorgan County, Golestan province, Iran.

== Demographics ==
=== Population ===
At the time of the 2006 National Census, the village's population was 2,140 in 577 households. The following census in 2011 counted 5,990 people in 746 households. The 2016 census measured the population of the village as 5,192 people in 803 households. It was the most populous village in its rural district.
