= Kui Sadaf =

Village in Golestan province, Iran

Kui Sadaf Persian: كوئ صدف
- Village
- Location within Iran
- Coordinates: 36°50′41″N 54°30′38″E
- Country: Iran
- Province: Golestan
- County: Gorgan
- District: Central
- Rural District: Estarabad-e Jonubi

Population (2016)
  - Total: 2,251
- Time zone: UTC+3:30 (IRST)

Kuy-e Sadaf (Persian: كوی صدف) (Note: Also romanized as Kūy-e Sadaf; also known as Qazzāq Maḩalleh (قزاق محله)) is a village in Estarabad-e Jonubi Rural District of the Central District in Gorgan County, Golestan province, Iran. The village is just east of Gorgan's city limits.

== Demographics ==
=== Population ===
At the time of the 2006 National Census, the village's population was 1,712 in 336 households. The following census in 2011 counted 1,807 people in 411 households. The 2016 census measured the population of the village as 2,251 people in 527 households.
