= Kola Sangian =

Village in Golestan province, Iran

Kola Sangian Persian: كلاسنگيان
- Village
- Location within Iran
- Coordinates: 36°48′17″N 54°18′39″E
- Country: Iran
- Province: Golestan
- County: Gorgan
- District: Central
- Rural District: Rushanabad

Population (2016)
  - Total: 431
- Time zone: UTC+3:30 (IRST)

Kola Sangian (Persian: كلاسنگيان) (Note: Also romanized as Kolā Sangīān) is a village in Rushanabad Rural District of the Central District in Gorgan County, Golestan province, Iran.

== Demographics ==
=== Population ===
At the time of the 2006 National Census, the village's population was 476 in 129 households. The following census in 2011 counted 438 people in 139 households. The 2016 census measured the population of the village as 431 people in 154 households.
