= Qaleh Mahmud =

Village in Golestan province, Iran

Qaleh Mahmud Persian: قلعه محمود
- Village
- Location within Iran
- Coordinates: 36°53′14″N 54°22′14″E
- Country: Iran
- Province: Golestan
- County: Gorgan
- District: Central
- Rural District: Anjirab

Population (2016)
  - Total: 1,467
- Time zone: UTC+3:30 (IRST)

Qaleh Mahmud (Persian: قلعه محمود) (Note: Also romanized as Qal‘eh Maḩmūd) is a village in Anjirab Rural District of the Central District in Gorgan County, Golestan province, Iran.

== Demographics ==
=== Population ===
At the time of the 2006 National Census, the village's population was 1,723 in 422 households. The following census in 2011 counted 1,653 people in 474 households. The 2016 census measured the population of the village as 1,467 people in 473 households.
