= Eslamabad-e Jelin =

Village in Golestan province, Iran

Eslamabad-e Jelin Persian: اسلام آباد جلين
- Village
- Location within Iran
- Coordinates: 36°51′26″N 54°31′28″E
- Country: Iran
- Province: Golestan
- County: Gorgan
- District: Central
- Rural District: Estarabad-e Jonubi

Population (2016)
  - Total: 1,622
- Time zone: UTC+3:30 (IRST)

Eslamabad-e Jelin (Persian: اسلام آباد جلين) (Note: Also romanized as Eslāmābād-e Jelīn; also known as Eslāmābād) is a village in Estarabad-e Jonubi Rural District of the Central District in Gorgan County, Golestan province, Iran.

== Demographics ==
=== Population ===
At the time of the 2006 National Census, the village's population was 1,288 in 278 households. The following census in 2011 counted 1,486 people in 406 households. The 2016 census measured the population of the village as 1,622 people in 472 households.
