= Soleyman Tappeh =

Village in Golestan province, Iran

Soleyman Tappeh Persian: سليمان تپه
- Village
- Location within Iran
- Coordinates: 36°55′07″N 54°20′34″E
- Country: Iran
- Province: Golestan
- County: Gorgan
- District: Central
- Rural District: Anjirab

Population (2016)
  - Total: 322
- Time zone: UTC+3:30 (IRST)

Soleyman Tappeh (Persian: سليمان تپه) (Note: Also romanized as Soleymān Tappeh) is a village in Anjirab Rural District of the Central District in Gorgan County, Golestan province, Iran.

== Demographics ==
=== Population ===
At the time of the 2006 National Census, the village's population was 319 in 73 households. The following census in 2011 counted 295 people in 79 households. The 2016 census measured the population of the village as 322 people in 82 households.
