= Takhshi Mahalleh =

Village in Golestan province, Iran

Takhshi Mahalleh Persian: تخشي محله
- Village
- Location within Iran
- Coordinates: 36°52′03″N 54°18′15″E
- Country: Iran
- Province: Golestan
- County: Gorgan
- District: Central
- Rural District: Rushanabad

Population (2016)
  - Total: 486
- Time zone: UTC+3:30 (IRST)

Takhshi Mahalleh (Persian: تخشي محله) (Note: Also romanized as Takhshī Maḩalleh) is a village in Rushanabad Rural District of the Central District in Gorgan County, Golestan province, Iran.

== Demographics ==
=== Population ===
At the time of the 2006 National Census, the village's population was 668 in 183 households. The following census in 2011 counted 614 people in 180 households. The 2016 census measured the population of the village as 486 people in 167 households.
