= Shahkuh-e Sofla =

Village in Golestan province, Iran

Shahkuh-e Sofla Persian: شاه كوه سفلی
- Village
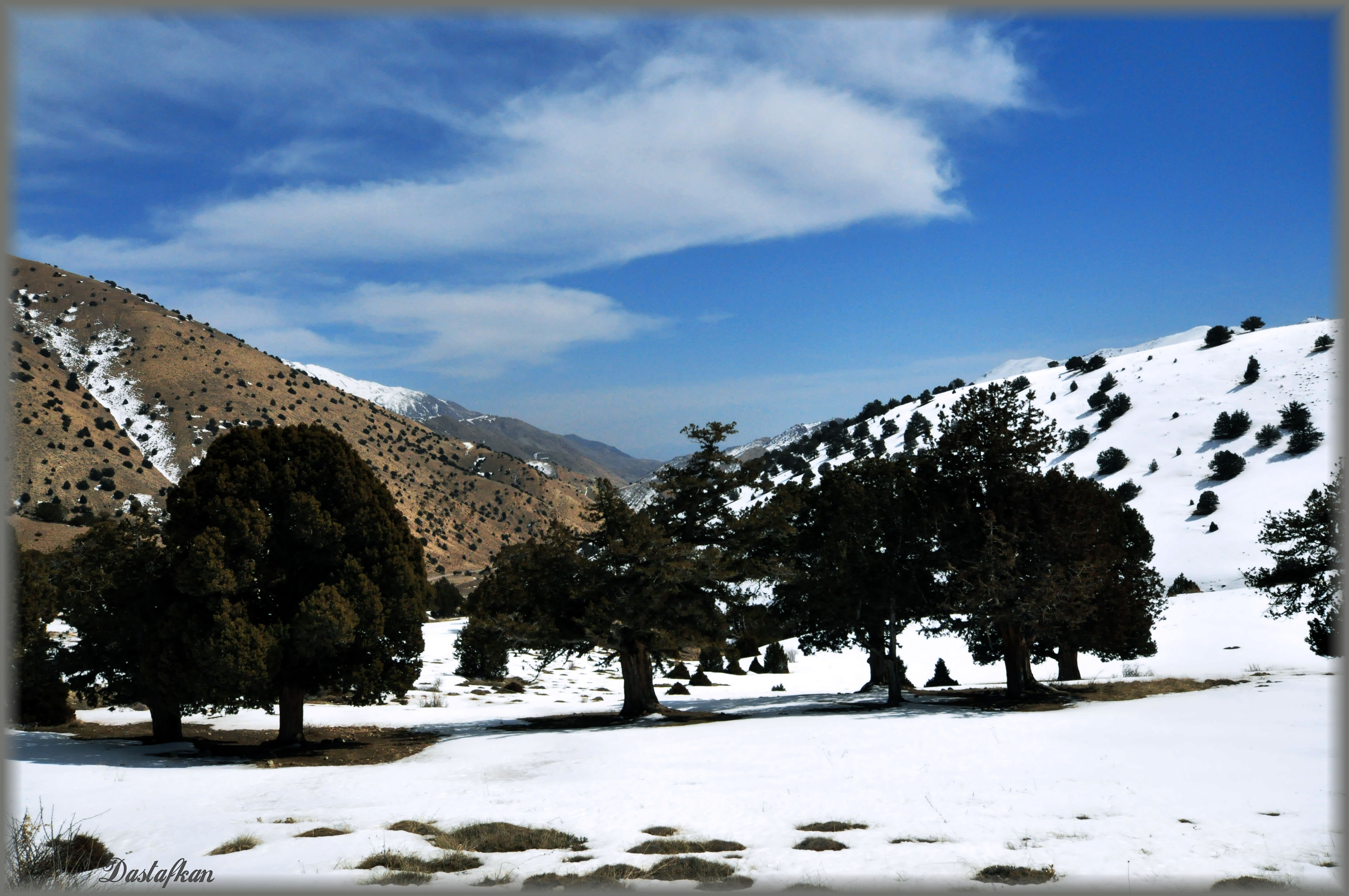
- Landscape of Shahkuh in March

- Location within Iran
- Coordinates: 36°33′36″N 54°24′54″E
- Country: Iran
- Province: Golestan
- County: Gorgan
- District: Central
- Rural District: Estarabad-e Jonubi

Population (2016)
  - Total: 583
- Time zone: UTC+3:30 (IRST)

Shahkuh-e Sofla (Persian: شاه كوه سفلی) (Note: Also romanized as Shāhkūh-e Soflá; also known as Shādkūh-e Pā’īn, Shāh Kūh-e Pā’īn, Shāhkūh Pāīn, and Shār Kūh-e Pā’īn) is a village in Estarabad-e Jonubi Rural District of the Central District in Gorgan County, Golestan province, Iran.

== Demographics ==
=== Population ===
At the time of the 2006 National Census, the village's population was 355 in 112 households. The following census in 2011 counted 326 people in 105 households. The 2016 census measured the population of the village as 583 people in 197 households.
