= Kafshgiri =

Village in Golestan province, Iran

Kafshgiri Persian: كفش گيري
- Village
- Location within Iran
- Coordinates: 36°47′55″N 54°17′22″E
- Country: Iran
- Province: Golestan
- County: Gorgan
- District: Central
- Rural District: Rushanabad

Population (2016)
  - Total: 2,143
- Time zone: UTC+3:30 (IRST)

Kafshgiri (Persian: كفش گيري) (Note: Also romanized as Kafshgīrī; also known as Sar Kalāteh-ye Kafshgīrī) is a village in Rushanabad Rural District of the Central District in Gorgan County, Golestan province, Iran.

== Demographics ==
=== Population ===
At the time of the 2006 National Census, the village's population was 1,767 in 493 households. The following census in 2011 counted 2,282 people in 719 households. The 2016 census measured the population of the village as 2,143 people in 727 households.
