= Nowmal =

Village in Golestan province, Iran

Nowmal Persian: نومل
- Village
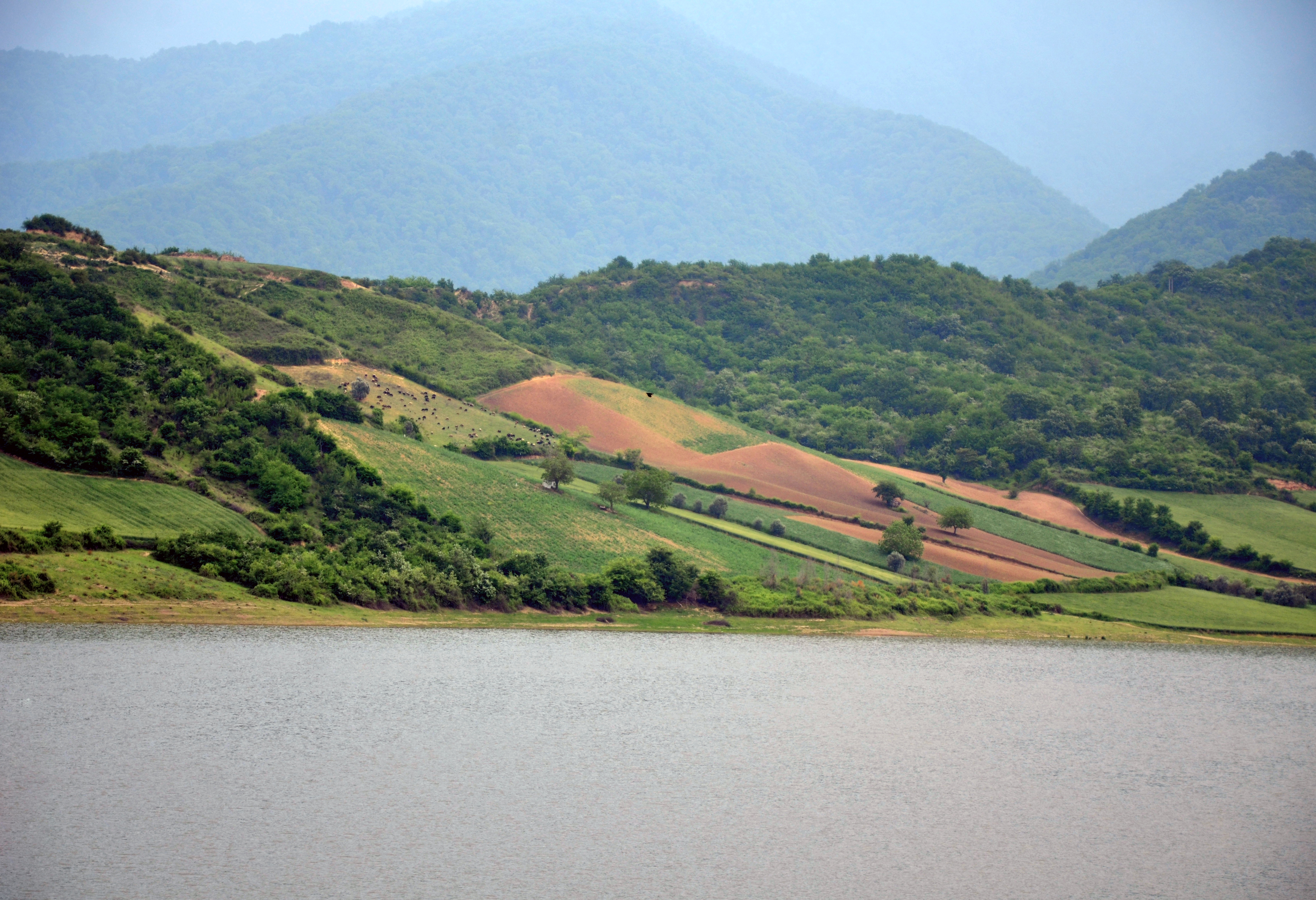
- Kowsar Lake

- Location within Iran
- Coordinates: 36°47′27″N 54°32′25″E
- Country: Iran
- Province: Golestan
- County: Gorgan
- District: Central
- Rural District: Estarabad-e Jonubi

Population (2016)
  - Total: 1,286
- Time zone: UTC+3:30 (IRST)

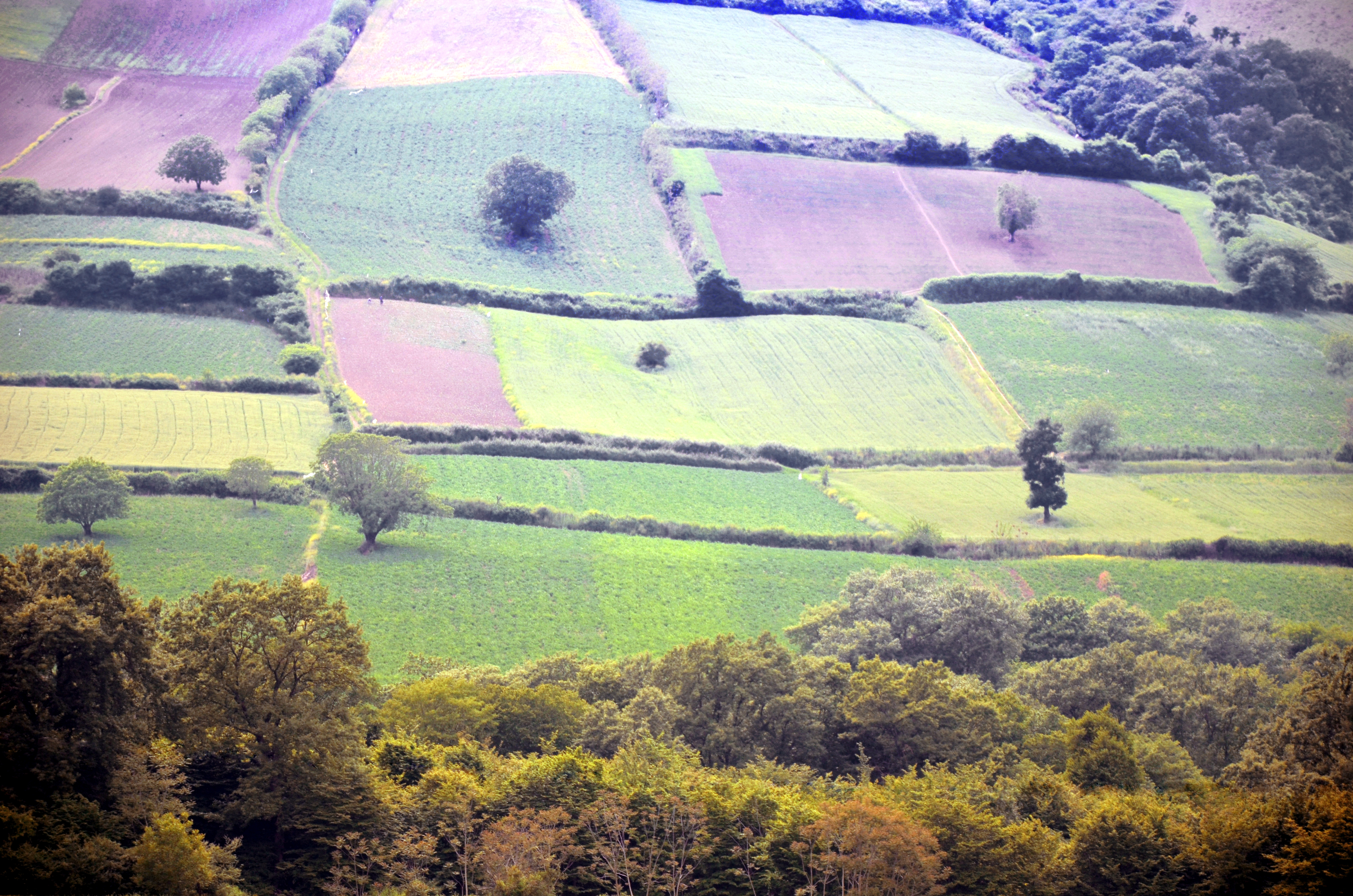
Fields near the village of Nowmal

Nowmal (Persian: نومل) (Note: Also romanized as Noomel; also known as Namul) is a village in Estarabad-e Jonubi Rural District of the Central District in Gorgan County, Golestan province, Iran.

== Demographics ==
=== Population ===
At the time of the 2006 National Census, the village's population was 1,329 in 354 households. The following census in 2011 counted 1,338 people in 400 households. The 2016 census measured the population of the village as 1,286 people in 404 households.
