= Kalu, Gorgan =

Village in Golestan province, Iran

Kalu Persian: كلو
- Village
- Location within Iran
- Coordinates: 36°48′51″N 54°20′51″E
- Country: Iran
- Province: Golestan
- County: Gorgan
- District: Central
- Rural District: Rushanabad

Population (2016)
  - Total: 296
- Time zone: UTC+3:30 (IRST)

Kalu (Persian: كلو) (Note: Also romanized as Kalū) is a village in Rushanabad Rural District of the Central District in Gorgan County, Golestan province, Iran.

== Demographics ==
=== Population ===
At the time of the 2006 National Census, the village's population was 394 in 90 households. The following census in 2011 counted 338 people in 96 households. The 2016 census measured the population of the village as 296 people in 106 households.
