= Esfahan Kalateh =

Village in Golestan province, Iran

Esfahan Kalateh Persian: اصفهان كلاته
- Village
- Location within Iran
- Coordinates: 36°50′20″N 54°33′58″E
- Country: Iran
- Province: Golestan
- County: Gorgan
- District: Central
- Rural District: Estarabad-e Jonubi

Population (2016)
  - Total: 766
- Time zone: UTC+3:30 (IRST)

Esfahan Kalateh (Persian: اصفهان كلاته) (Note: Also romanized as Eşfahān Kalāteh) is a village in Estarabad-e Jonubi Rural District of the Central District in Gorgan County, Golestan province, Iran.

== Demographics ==
=== Population ===
At the time of the 2006 National Census, the village's population was 876 in 249 households. The following census in 2011 counted 816 people in 247 households. The 2016 census measured the population of the village as 766 people in 252 households.
