= Shamushak =

Shamushak (Persian: شموشك) may refer to:

- Shamushak-e Olya
- Shamushak-e Sofla
