= Shir Aliabad =

Village in Golestan province, Iran

Shir Aliabad Persian: شيرعلي آباد
- Village
- Location within Iran
- Coordinates: 36°52′48″N 54°22′42″E
- Country: Iran
- Province: Golestan
- County: Gorgan
- District: Central
- Rural District: Anjirab

Population (2016)
  - Total: 418
- Time zone: UTC+3:30 (IRST)

Shir Aliabad (Persian: شيرعلي آباد) (Note: Also romanized as Shīr ʿAlīābād) is a village in Anjirab Rural District of the Central District in Gorgan County, Golestan province, Iran.

== Demographics ==
=== Population ===
At the time of the 2006 National Census, the village's population was 439 in 110 households. The following census in 2011 counted 470 people in 136 households. The 2016 census measured the population of the village as 418 people in 127 households.
