= Nowdijeh =

Village in Golestan province, Iran

Nowdijeh Persian: نوديجه
- Village
- Location within Iran
- Coordinates: 36°50′15″N 54°16′26″E
- Country: Iran
- Province: Golestan
- County: Gorgan
- District: Central
- Rural District: Rushanabad

Population (2016)
  - Total: 3,441
- Time zone: UTC+3:30 (IRST)

Nowdijeh (Persian: نوديجه) (Note: Also romanized as Nowdījeh) is a village in Rushanabad Rural District of the Central District in Gorgan County, Golestan province, Iran.

== Demographics ==
=== Population ===
At the time of the 2006 National Census, the village's population was 3,532 in 864 households. The following census in 2011 counted 3,788 people in 1,097 households. The 2016 census measured the population of the village as 3,441 people in 1,136 households. It was the most populous village in its rural district.
