= Tushan, Iran =

Village in Golestan province, Iran

Tushan Persian: توشن
- Village
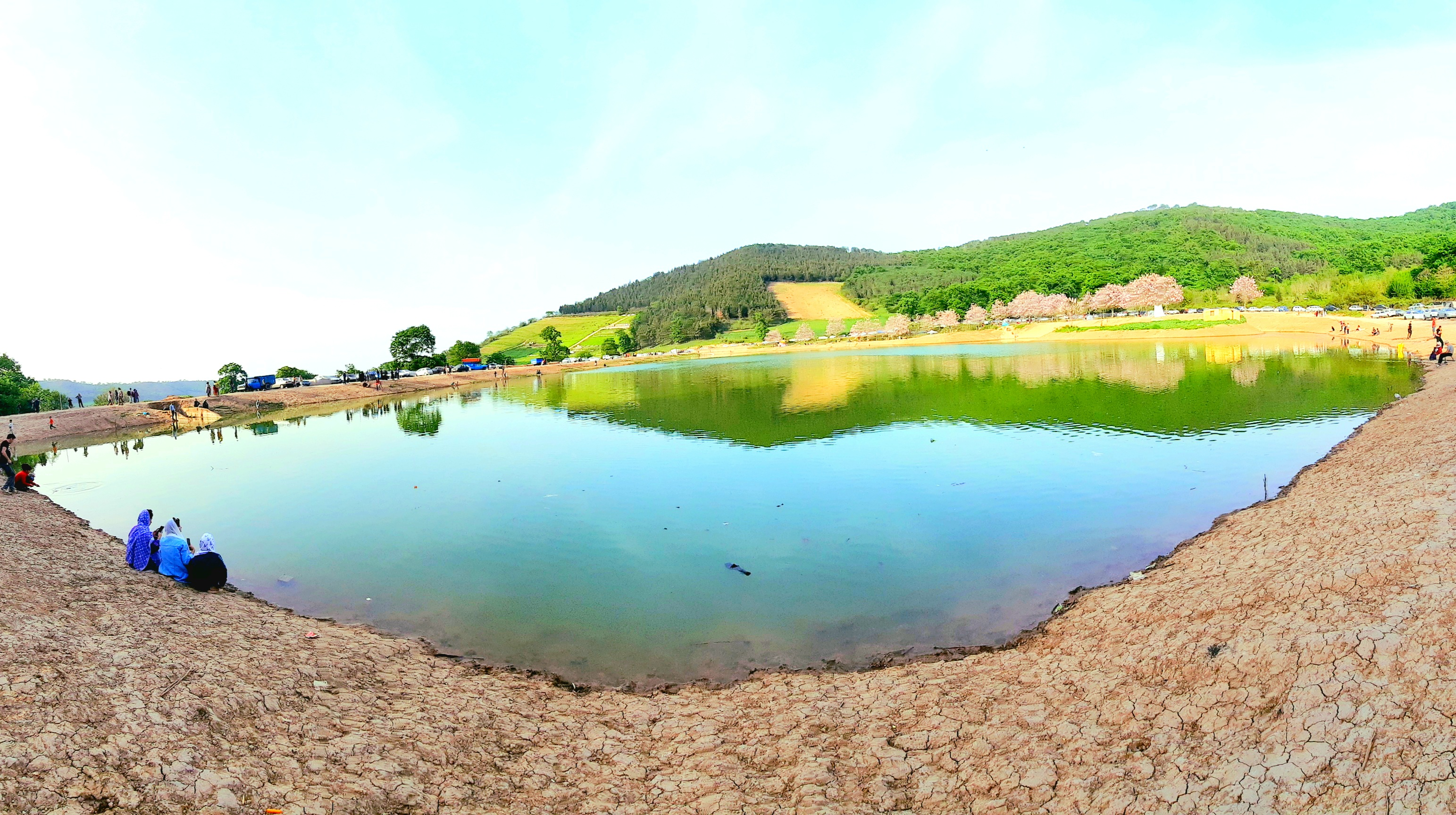
- Tushan Ab bandan

- Location within Iran
- Coordinates: 36°48′15″N 54°25′50″E
- Country: Iran
- Province: Golestan
- County: Gorgan
- District: Central
- Rural District: Anjirab

Population (2016)
  - Total: 1,149
- Time zone: UTC+3:30 (IRST)

Tushan (Persian: توشن) (Note: Also romanized as Tūshan) is a village in Anjirab Rural District of the Central District in Gorgan County, Golestan province, Iran.

== Geography ==
Tushan is 2.5 km (1.6 mi) southwest of Gorgan city. There is a water seal south of the village, surrounded by forests and pastures. The water of the lake comes from the "Dobarar" spring inside the forests.

== Demographics ==
=== Population ===
At the time of the 2006 National Census, the village's population was 798 in 209 households. The following census in 2011 counted 1,011 people in 299 households. The 2016 census measured the population of the village as 1,149 people in 367 households.
