= Yalu, Iran =

Village in Golestan province, Iran

Yalu Persian: يالو
- Village
- Location within Iran
- Coordinates: 36°47′24″N 54°21′53″E
- Country: Iran
- Province: Golestan
- County: Gorgan
- District: Central
- Rural District: Rushanabad

Population (2016)
  - Total: 68
- Time zone: UTC+3:30 (IRST)

Yalu (Persian: يالو) (Note: Also romanized as Yālū) is a village in Rushanabad Rural District of the Central District in Gorgan County, Golestan province, Iran.

== Demographics ==
=== Population ===
At the time of the 2006 National Census, the village's population was 110 in 27 households. The following census in 2011 counted 50 people in 16 households. The 2016 census measured the population of the village as 68 people in 22 households.
