= Lamsak =

Village in Golestan province, Iran

Lamsak Persian: لمسك
- Village
- Location within Iran
- Coordinates: 36°50′45″N 54°20′01″E
- Country: Iran
- Province: Golestan
- County: Gorgan
- District: Central
- Rural District: Rushanabad

Population (2016)
  - Total: 1,449
- Time zone: UTC+3:30 (IRST)

Lamsak (Persian: لمسك) is a village in, and the capital of, Rushanabad Rural District in the Central District of Gorgan County, Golestan province, Iran.

== Demographics ==
=== Population ===
At the time of the 2006 National Census, the village's population was 1,707 in 421 households. The following census in 2011 counted 1,635 people in 473 households. The 2016 census measured the population of the village as 1,449 people in 493 households.
