= Alfan =

Village in Golestan province, Iran

Alfan Persian: آلفن
- Village
- Country: Iran
- Province: Golestan
- County: Gorgan
- District: Central
- Rural District: Rushanabad

Population (2016)
  - Total: 256
- Time zone: UTC+3:30 (IRST)

Alfan (Persian: آلفن) (Note: Also romanized as Ālfan) is a village in Rushanabad Rural District of the Central District in Gorgan County, Golestan province, Iran.

== Demographics ==
=== Population ===
At the time of the 2006 National Census, the village's population was 297 in 65 households. The following census in 2011 counted 334 people in 94 households. The 2016 census measured the population of the village as 256 people in 86 households.
