= Nasrabad, Golestan =

Village in Golestan province, Iran

Nasrabad Persian: نصرآباد
- Village
- Location within Iran
- Coordinates: 36°50′06″N 54°30′01″E
- Country: Iran
- Province: Golestan
- County: Gorgan
- District: Central
- Rural District: Estarabad-e Jonubi

Population (2016)
  - Total: 4,129
- Time zone: UTC+3:30 (IRST)

Nasrabad (Persian: نصرآباد) (Note: Also romanized as Naşrābād) is a village in Estarabad-e Jonubi Rural District of the Central District in Gorgan County, Golestan province, Iran.

== Demographics ==
=== Population ===
At the time of the 2006 National Census, the village's population was 3,651 in 907 households. The following census in 2011 counted 4,103 people in 1,162 households. The 2016 census measured the population of the village as 4,129 people in 1,209 households. It was the most populous village in its rural district.
