= Qarnabad =

Village in Golestan province, Iran

Qarnabad Persian: قرن آباد
- Village
- Location within Iran
- Coordinates: 36°49′16″N 54°35′34″E
- Country: Iran
- Province: Golestan
- County: Gorgan
- District: Central
- Rural District: Estarabad-e Jonubi

Population (2016)
  - Total: 1,744
- Time zone: UTC+3:30 (IRST)

Qarnabad (Persian: قرن آباد) (Note: Also romanized as Qarnābād) is a village in Estarabad-e Jonubi Rural District of the Central District in Gorgan County, Golestan province, Iran.

== Demographics ==
=== Population ===
At the time of the 2006 National Census, the village's population was 1,961 in 507 households. The following census in 2011 counted 2,020 people in 601 households. The 2016 census measured the population of the village as 1,744 people in 572 households.
