= Sadabad, Golestan =

Village in Golestan province, Iran

Sadabad Persian: سعداباد
- Village
- Location within Iran
- Coordinates: 36°49′06″N 54°22′43″E
- Country: Iran
- Province: Golestan
- County: Gorgan
- District: Central
- Rural District: Anjirab

Population (2016)
  - Total: 1,834
- Time zone: UTC+3:30 (IRST)

Sadabad (Persian: سعداباد) (Note: Also romanized as Sa‘dābād) is a village in Anjirab Rural District of the Central District in Gorgan County, Golestan province, Iran.

== Demographics ==
=== Population ===
At the time of the 2006 National Census, the village's population was 1,746 in 476 households. The following census in 2011 counted 1,861 people in 536 households. The 2016 census measured the population of the village as 1,834 people in 569 households.
