= Feyzabad, Golestan =

Village in Golestan province, Iran

Feyzabad Persian: فيض آباد
- Village
- Location within Iran
- Coordinates: 36°51′25″N 54°29′50″E
- Country: Iran
- Province: Golestan
- County: Gorgan
- District: Central
- Rural District: Estarabad-e Jonubi

Population (2016)
  - Total: 891
- Time zone: UTC+3:30 (IRST)

Feyzabad (Persian: فيض آباد) (Note: Also romanized as Feyẕābād; also known as Faizābād) is a village in Estarabad-e Jonubi Rural District of the Central District in Gorgan County, Golestan province, Iran. The village is just east of Gorgan's city limits.

== Demographics ==
=== Population ===
At the time of the 2006 National Census, the village's population was 911 in 211 households. The following census in 2011 counted 919 people in 268 households. The 2016 census measured the population of the village as 891 people in 274 households.
