= Kolajan =

Kolajan or Kolajen (Persian: كلاجان) may refer to:

- Kolajan-e Qajar
- Kolajan-e Sadat
