= Valikabad =

Village in Golestan province, Iran

Valikabad Persian: ولیک آباد
- Village
- Location within Iran
- Coordinates: 36°52′05″N 54°29′08″E
- Country: Iran
- Province: Golestan
- County: Gorgan
- District: Central
- Rural District: Estarabad-e Jonubi

Population (2016)
  - Total: 470
- Time zone: UTC+3:30 (IRST)

Valikabad (Persian: ولیک آباد) (Note: Also romanized as Valīkābād) is a village in Estarabad-e Jonubi Rural District of the Central District in Gorgan County, Golestan province, Iran. The village is a few kilometers northeast of Gorgan's city limits.

== Demographics ==
=== Population ===
At the time of the 2006 National Census, the village's population was 497 in 135 households. The following census in 2011 counted 537 people in 153 households. The 2016 census measured the population of the village as 470 people in 152 households.
