= Shamushak-e Olya =

Village in Golestan province, Iran

Shamushak-e Olya Persian: شموشك عليا
- Village
- Location within Iran
- Coordinates: 36°45′26″N 54°16′31″E
- Country: Iran
- Province: Golestan
- County: Gorgan
- District: Central
- Rural District: Rushanabad

Population (2016)
  - Total: 863
- Time zone: UTC+3:30 (IRST)

Shamushak-e Olya (Persian: شموشك عليا) (Note: Also romanized as Shamūshak-e ‘Olyā; also known as Shamūshak-e Bālā) is a village in Rushanabad Rural District of the Central District in Gorgan County, Golestan province, Iran.

== Demographics ==
=== Population ===
At the time of the 2006 National Census, the village's population was 886 in 239 households. The following census in 2011 counted 918 people in 273 households. The 2016 census measured the population of the village as 863 people in 293 households.
