= Lamlang =

Village in Golestan province, Iran

Lamlang Persian: لاملنگ
- Village
- Location within Iran
- Coordinates: 36°51′42″N 54°22′08″E
- Country: Iran
- Province: Golestan
- County: Gorgan
- District: Central
- Rural District: Anjirab

Population (2016)
  - Total: 624
- Time zone: UTC+3:30 (IRST)

Lamlang (Persian: لاملنگ) (Note: Also romanized as Lāmlang; also known as Lālang) is a village in Anjirab Rural District of the Central District in Gorgan County, Golestan province, Iran.

== Demographics ==
=== Population ===
At the time of the 2006 National Census, the village's population was 558 in 137 households. The following census in 2011 counted 572 people in 177 households. The 2016 census measured the population of the village as 624 people in 192 households.
