= Mamai (disambiguation) =

Mamai may refer to:

- Mamai, a military commander of the Blue Horde in the 14th century
- Mamai, Armenia
- Mamai, Iran, a village in Golestan Province, Iran
- Cossack Mamay
- Mamay (lake), Kazakhstan
- Mamai, Shusha, Azerbaijan one of seventeen quarters in Shusha town, Azerbaijan
