= Shamushak-e Sofla =

Village in Golestan province, Iran

Shamushak-e Sofla Persian: شموشك سفلي
- Village
- Location within Iran
- Coordinates: 36°46′36″N 54°16′21″E
- Country: Iran
- Province: Golestan
- County: Gorgan
- District: Central
- Rural District: Rushanabad

Population (2016)
  - Total: 835
- Time zone: UTC+3:30 (IRST)

Shamushak-e Sofla (Persian: شموشك سفلي) (Note: Also romanized as Shamūshak-e Soflá; also known as Shamūshak-e Pā’īn) is a village in Rushanabad Rural District of the Central District in Gorgan County, Golestan province, Iran.

== Demographics ==
=== Population ===
At the time of the 2006 National Census, the village's population was 882 in 218 households. The following census in 2011 counted 925 people in 272 households. The 2016 census measured the population of the village as 835 people in 282 households.
