= Sistani Mahalleh =

Village in Golestan province, Iran

Sistani Mahalleh Persian: سيستاني محله
- Village
- Location within Iran
- Coordinates: 36°54′31″N 54°22′27″E
- Country: Iran
- Province: Golestan
- County: Gorgan
- District: Central
- Rural District: Anjirab

Population (2016)
  - Total: 902
- Time zone: UTC+3:30 (IRST)

Sistani Mahalleh (Persian: سيستاني محله) (Note: Also romanized as Sīstānī Maḩalleh; also known as Sīstān Maḩalleh) is a village in Anjirab Rural District of the Central District in Gorgan County, Golestan province, Iran.

== Demographics ==
=== Population ===
At the time of the 2006 National Census, the village's population was 902 in 201 households. The following census in 2011 counted 951 people in 248 households. The 2016 census measured the population of the village as 902 people in 257 households.
