= Varsan, Golestan =

Village in Golestan province, Iran

Varsan Persian: ورسن
- Village
- Location within Iran
- Coordinates: 36°50′29″N 54°19′31″E
- Country: Iran
- Province: Golestan
- County: Gorgan
- District: Central
- Rural District: Rushanabad

Population (2016)
  - Total: 796
- Time zone: UTC+3:30 (IRST)

Varsan (Persian: ورسن) is a village in Rushanabad Rural District of the Central District in Gorgan County, Golestan province, Iran.

== Demographics ==
=== Population ===
At the time of the 2006 National Census, the village's population was 905 in 226 households. The following census in 2011 counted 867 people in 256 households. The 2016 census measured the population of the village as 796 people in 266 households.
