= Sar Kalateh-ye Kafshgiri =

Village in Golestan province, Iran

Sar Kalateh-ye Kafshgiri Persian: سركلاته كفش گيري
- Village
- Location within Iran
- Coordinates: 36°47′33″N 54°16′55″E
- Country: Iran
- Province: Golestan
- County: Gorgan
- District: Central
- Rural District: Rushanabad

Population (2016)
  - Total: 971
- Time zone: UTC+3:30 (IRST)

Sar Kalateh-ye Kafshgiri (Persian: سركلاته كفش گيري) (Note: Also romanized as Sar Kalāteh-ye Kafshgīrī; also known as Sar Kalāteh) is a village in Rushanabad Rural District of the Central District in Gorgan County, Golestan province, Iran.

== Demographics ==
=== Population ===
At the time of the 2006 National Census, the village's population was 967 in 240 households. The following census in 2011 counted 990 people in 275 households. The 2016 census measured the population of the village as 971 people in 297 households.
