= Varsan =

Varsan (Persian: ورسن or ورسان) may refer to:

- Varsan, Golestan (ورسن)
- Varsan, Markazi (ورسان - Varsān)
