= Kolajan-e Qajar =

Village in Golestan province, Iran

Kolajan-e Qajar Persian: كلاجان قاجار
- Village
- Location within Iran
- Coordinates: 36°49′44″N 54°18′17″E
- Country: Iran
- Province: Golestan
- County: Gorgan
- District: Central
- Rural District: Rushanabad

Population (2016)
  - Total: 645
- Time zone: UTC+3:30 (IRST)

Kolajan-e Qajar (Persian: كلاجان قاجار) (Note: Also romanized as Kolājān-e Qājār) is a village in Rushanabad Rural District of the Central District in Gorgan County, Golestan province, Iran.

== Demographics ==
=== Population ===
At the time of the 2006 National Census, the village's population was 717 in 200 households. The following census in 2011 counted 734 people in 224 households. The 2016 census measured the population of the village as 645 people in 215 households.
