= Mamai, Iran =

Village in Golestan province, Iran

Mamai Persian: مامايي
- Village
- Location within Iran
- Coordinates: 36°53′33″N 54°23′52″E
- Country: Iran
- Province: Golestan
- County: Gorgan
- District: Central
- Rural District: Anjirab

Population (2016)
  - Total: 477
- Time zone: UTC+3:30 (IRST)

Mamai (Persian: مامايي) (Note: Also romanized as Māmā’ī) is a village in Anjirab Rural District of the Central District in Gorgan County, Golestan province, Iran.

== Demographics ==
=== Population ===
At the time of the 2006 National Census, the village's population was 478 in 117 households. The following census in 2011 counted 496 people in 129 households. The 2016 census measured the population of the village as 477 people in 138 households.
