= Kolajan-e Sadat =

Village in Golestan province, Iran

Kolajan-e Sadat Persian: كلاجان سادات
- Village
- Location within Iran
- Coordinates: 36°49′38″N 54°17′22″E
- Country: Iran
- Province: Golestan
- County: Gorgan
- District: Central
- Rural District: Rushanabad

Population (2016)
  - Total: 218
- Time zone: UTC+3:30 (IRST)

Kolajan-e Sadat (Persian: كلاجان سادات) (Note: Also romanized as Kolājān-e Sādāt) is a village in Rushanabad Rural District of the Central District (Gorgan County), Golestan province, Iran.

== Demographics ==
=== Population ===
At the time of the 2006 National Census, the village's population was 243 in 58 households. The following census in 2011 counted 236 people in 62 households. The 2016 census measured the population of the village as 218 people in 73 households.
