= Lalang =

Lalang may refer to:

- Operation Lalang, Malaysian police action
- Imperata cylindrica, a species of grass called lalang in the Malay language
- Boaz Kiplagat Lalang (born 1989), Kenyan runner
- Lawi Lalang (born 1991), Kenyan runner
- Lalang, Iran, a village in Golestan Province, Iran
- Lalang (island), an island in the Federated States of Micronesia
