= Chalaki, Golestan =

Village in Golestan province, Iran

Chalaki Persian: چالكي
- Village
- Location within Iran
- Coordinates: 36°50′16″N 54°18′05″E
- Country: Iran
- Province: Golestan
- County: Gorgan
- District: Central
- Rural District: Rushanabad

Population (2016)
  - Total: 386
- Time zone: UTC+3:30 (IRST)

Chalaki (Persian: چالكي) (Note: Also romanized as Chālakī, Chālekī, and Chalki) is a village in Rushanabad Rural District of the Central District in Gorgan County, Golestan province, Iran.

== Demographics ==
=== Population ===
At the time of the 2006 National Census, the village's population was 491 in 130 households. The following census in 2011 counted 441 people in 132 households. The 2016 census measured the population of the village as 386 people in 138 households.
