= Jelin-e Sofla =

Village in Golestan province, Iran

Jelin-e Sofla Persian: جلين سفلی
- Village
- Location within Iran
- Coordinates: 36°51′06″N 54°32′21″E
- Country: Iran
- Province: Golestan
- County: Gorgan
- District: Central
- Rural District: Estarabad-e Jonubi

Population (2016)
  - Total: 548
- Time zone: UTC+3:30 (IRST)

Jelin-e Sofla (Persian: جلين سفلی) (Note: Also romanized as Jelīn-e Soflá; also known as Jelīn-e Pā’īn) is a village in Estarabad-e Jonubi Rural District of the Central District in Gorgan County, Golestan province, Iran.

== Demographics ==
=== Population ===
At the time of the 2006 National Census, the village's population was 526 in 120 households. The following census in 2011 counted 583 people in 160 households. The 2016 census measured the population of the village as 548 people in 159 households.
