= Sar Kalateh =

Sar Kalateh (Persian: سركلاته) may refer to:

- Sar Kalateh-ye Kafshgiri
- Sar Kalateh-ye Kharab Shahr
