= Halki =

Halki or Chalki can refer to several different things:

- Chalki (also Khalki or Halki), a Greek island in the Dodecanese
- Heybeliada (Chalki in Greek), one of the Princes' Islands near Istanbul
  - The Halki seminary, located on Heybeliada
- Chalaki, Golestan, in northern Iran, sometimes spelt Chalki
- Ḫalki, Hittite grain deity.
- Ige-Halki, a king of ancient Elam (mid 14th century BCE).

Not to be confused with Chalcis, a town in Greece.
