= Rushanabad Rural District =

Rural district in Golestan province, Iran

Rushanabad Rural District Persian: دهستان روشن آباد
- Rural District
- Location within Iran
- Coordinates: 36°49′N 54°19′E
- Country: Iran
- Province: Golestan
- County: Gorgan
- District: Central
- Established: 1987
- Capital: Lamsak

Population (2016)
  - Total: 23,950
- Time zone: UTC+3:30 (IRST)

Rushanabad Rural District (Persian: دهستان روشن آباد) is in the Central District of Gorgan County, Golestan province, Iran. Its capital is the village of Lamsak.

== Demographics ==
=== Population ===
At the time of the 2006 National Census, the rural district's population was 25,066 in 6,340 households. There were 25,840 inhabitants in 7,501 households at the following census of 2011. The 2016 census measured the population of the rural district as 23,950 in 7803 households. The most populous of its 24 villages was Nowdijeh, with 3,441 people.

=== Other villages in the rural district ===
- Alfan
- Chalaki
- Esbu Mahalleh
- Hashemabad
- Heydarabad
- Kafshgiri
- Kalu
- Kola Sangian
- Kolajan-e Qajar
- Kolajan-e Sadat
- Laldevin
- Now Chaman
- Qalandar Mahalleh
- Sadan
- Sar Kalateh-ye Kafshgiri
- Seyyed Miran
- Shamushak-e Olya
- Shamushak-e Sofla
- Takhshi Mahalleh
- Varsan
- Yalu
- Yisi Mahalleh
