= Estarabad-e Jonubi Rural District =

Rural district in Golestan province, Iran

Estarabad-e Jonubi Rural District Persian: دهستان استرآباد جنوبی
- Rural District
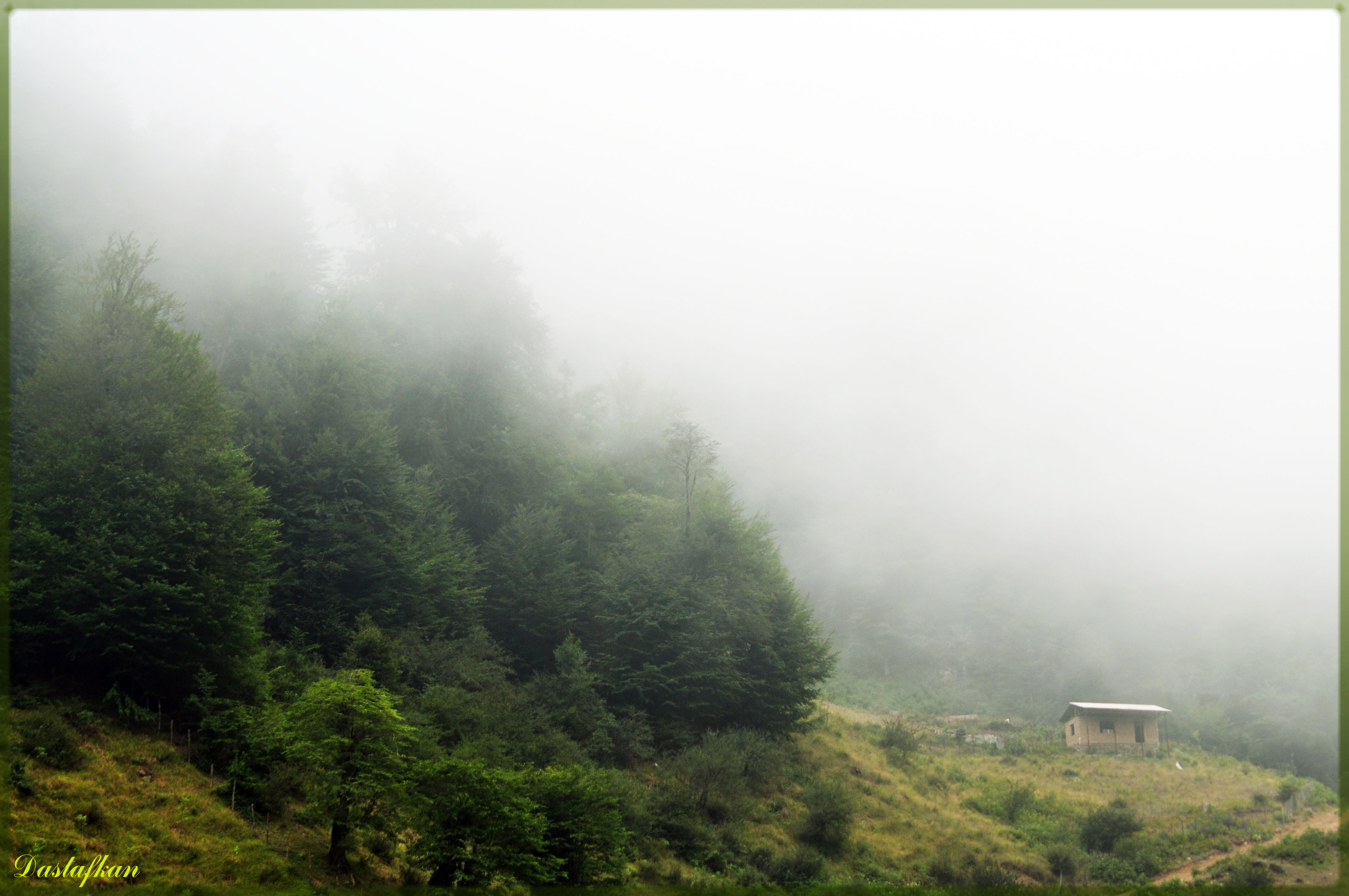
- The village of Ziarat

- Location within Iran
- Coordinates: 36°42′N 54°32′E
- Country: Iran
- Province: Golestan
- County: Gorgan
- District: Central
- Established: 1987
- Capital: Jelin

Population (2016)
  - Total: 23,108
- Time zone: UTC+3:30 (IRST)

Estarabad-e Jonubi Rural District (Persian: دهستان استرآباد جنوبی) is in the Central District of Gorgan County, Golestan province, Iran. It is administered from the city of Jelin. (Note: Formerly the village of Jelin-e Olya)

== Demographics ==
=== Population ===
At the time of the 2006 National Census, the rural district's population was 29,216 in 7,326 households. There were 22,864 inhabitants in 6,463 households at the following census of 2011. The 2016 census measured the population of the rural district as 23,108 in 6,999 households. The most populous of its 33 villages was Nasrabad, with 4,129 people.

=== Other villages in the rural district ===
- Ahangar Mahalleh
- Bagh-e Golbon
- Chahar Bagh
- Dar Asiab
- Do Dangeh
- Esfahan Kalateh
- Eslamabad-e Jelin
- Feyzabad
- Jelin-e Sofla
- Kheyrat
- Kui Sadaf
- Maryamabad
- Nahar Khoran
- Nowmal
- Qarnabad
- Shahkuh-e Sofla
- Siahtalu
- Tuskastan
- Valikabad
- Ziarat

== Gallery ==
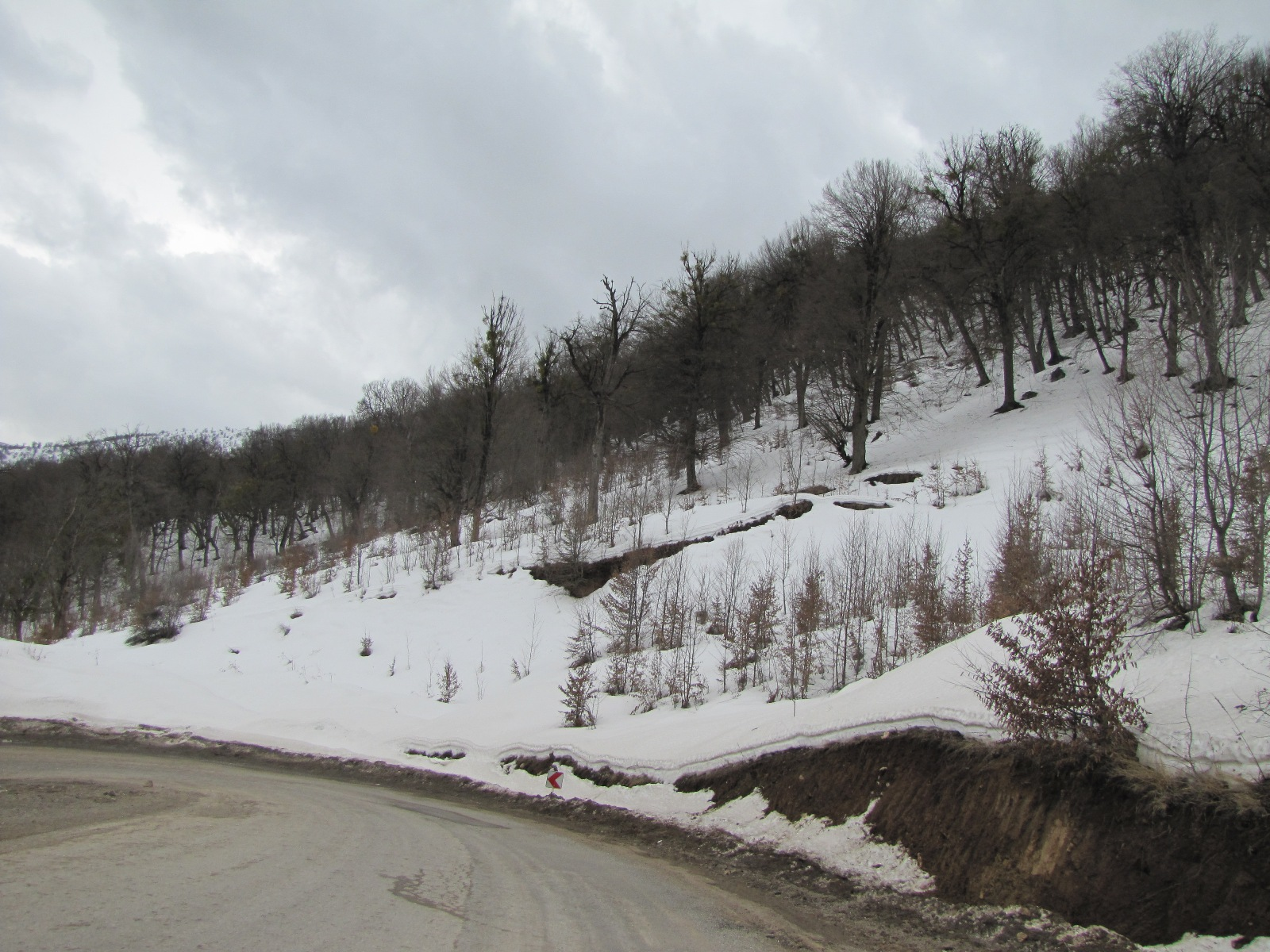
Forest in Tuskestan Road

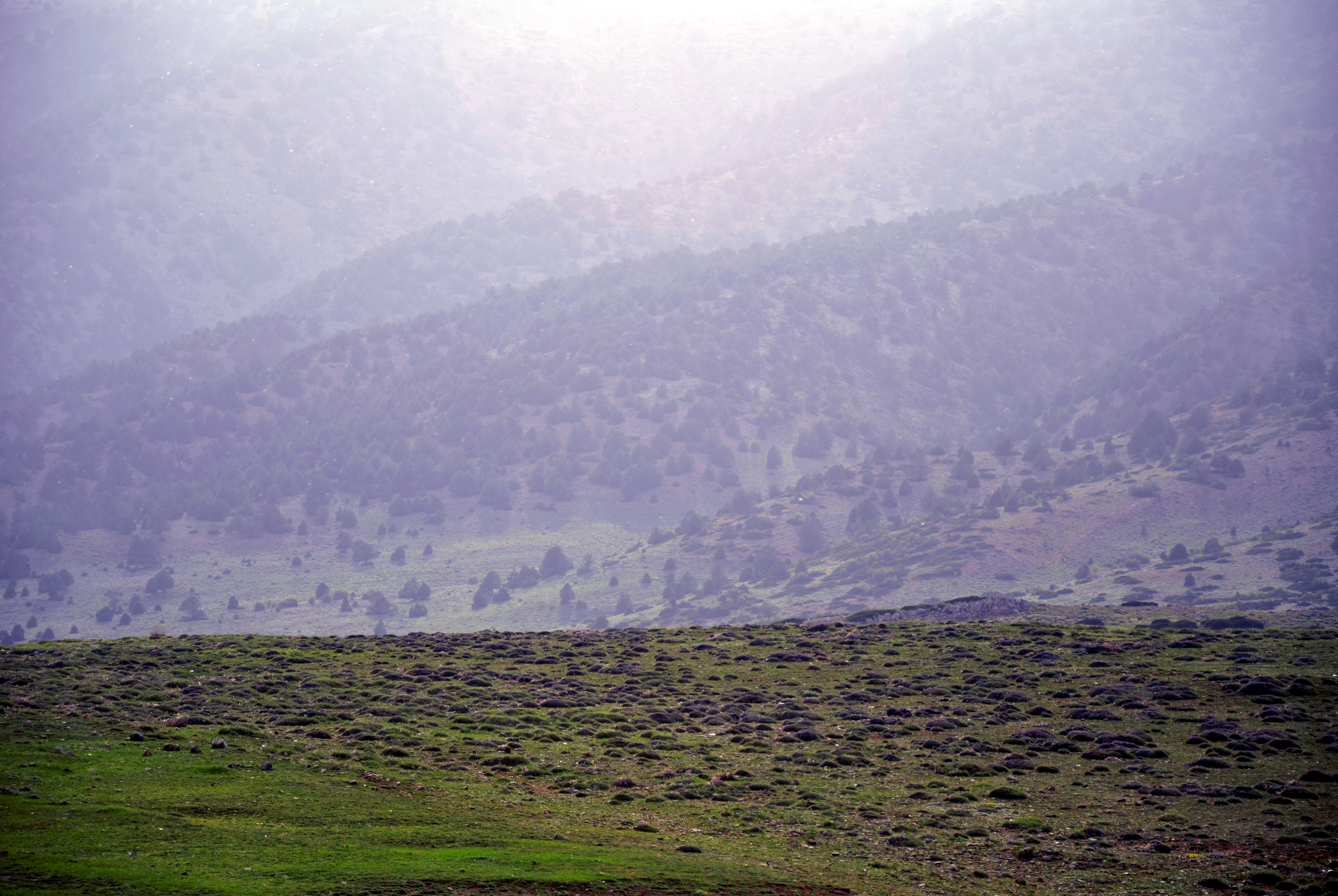
Tuskestan Mountains

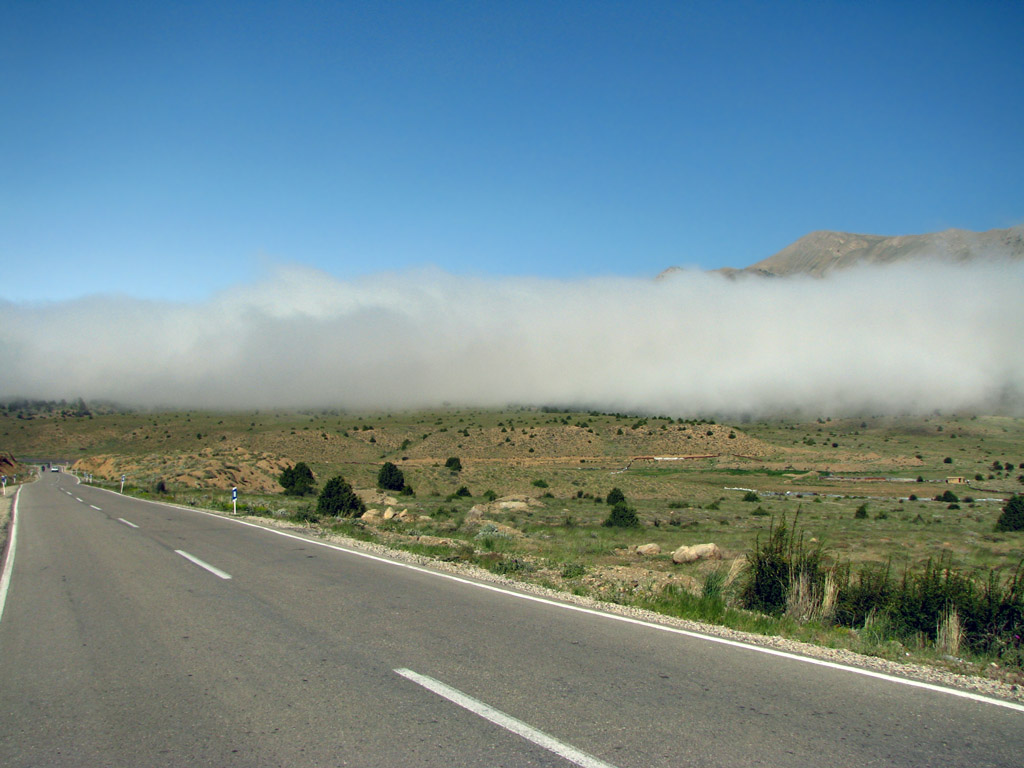
Tuskestan Road

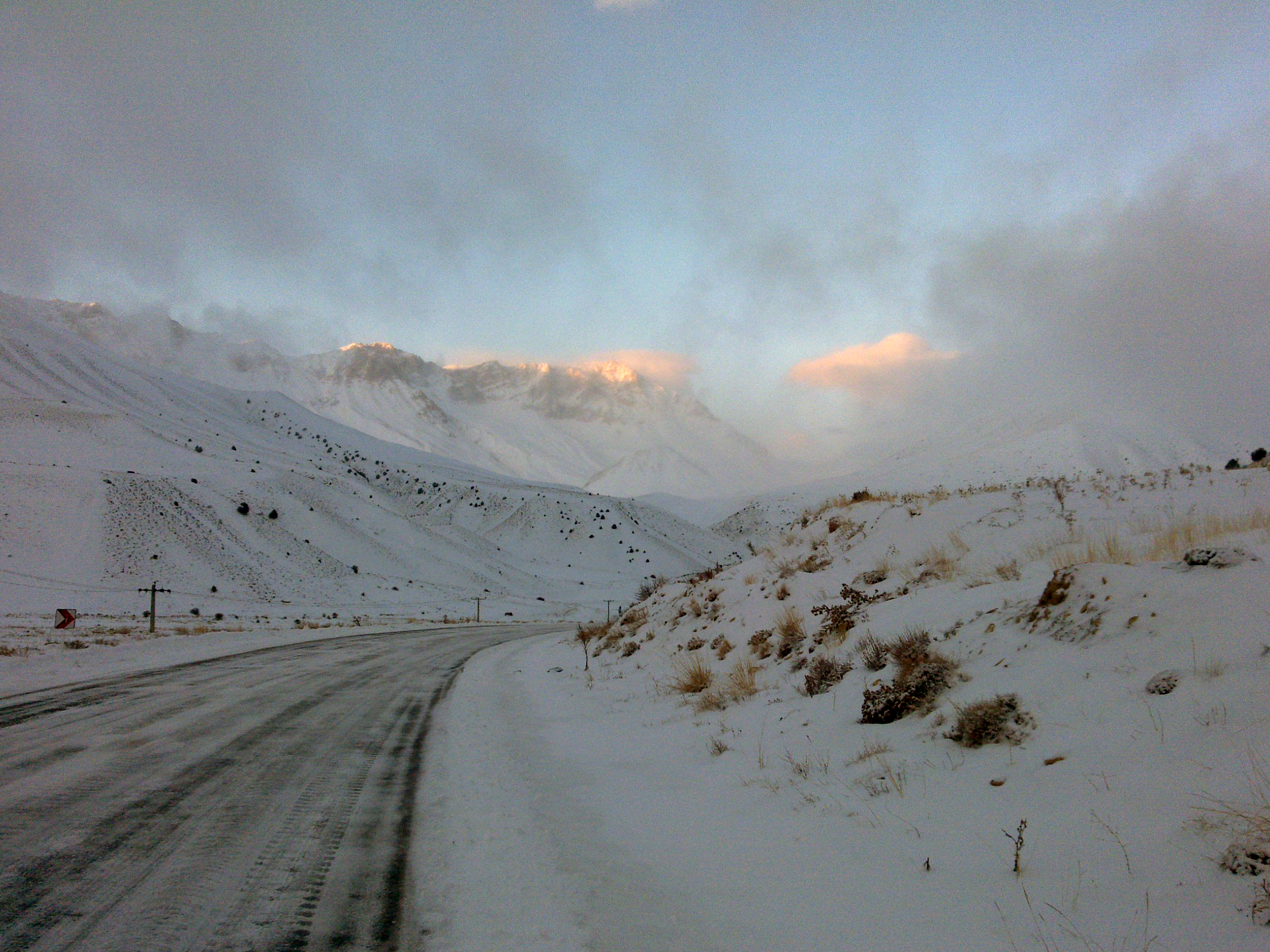
Snow near Shahkuh

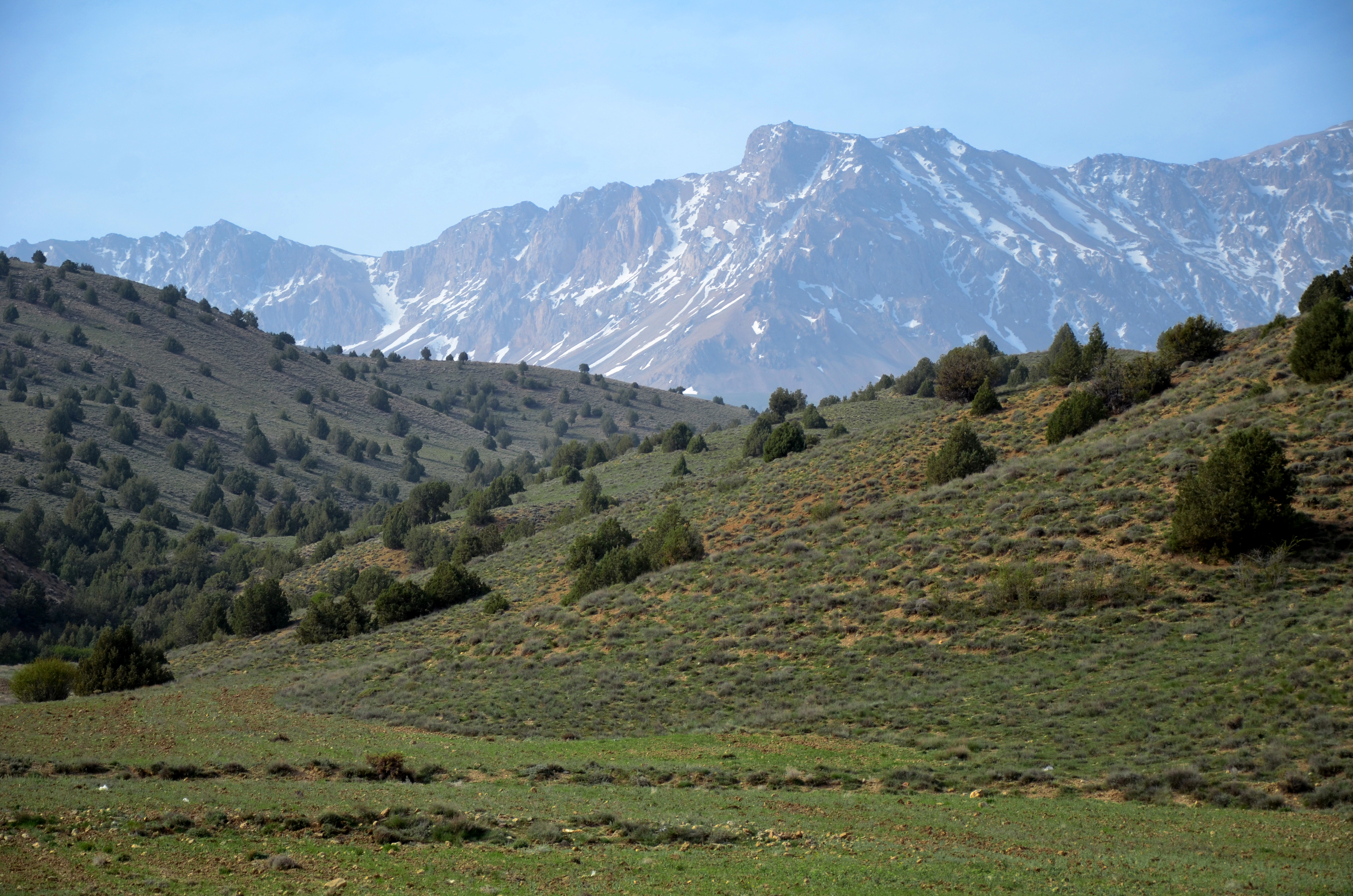
Shahvar Peak from Shahkuh

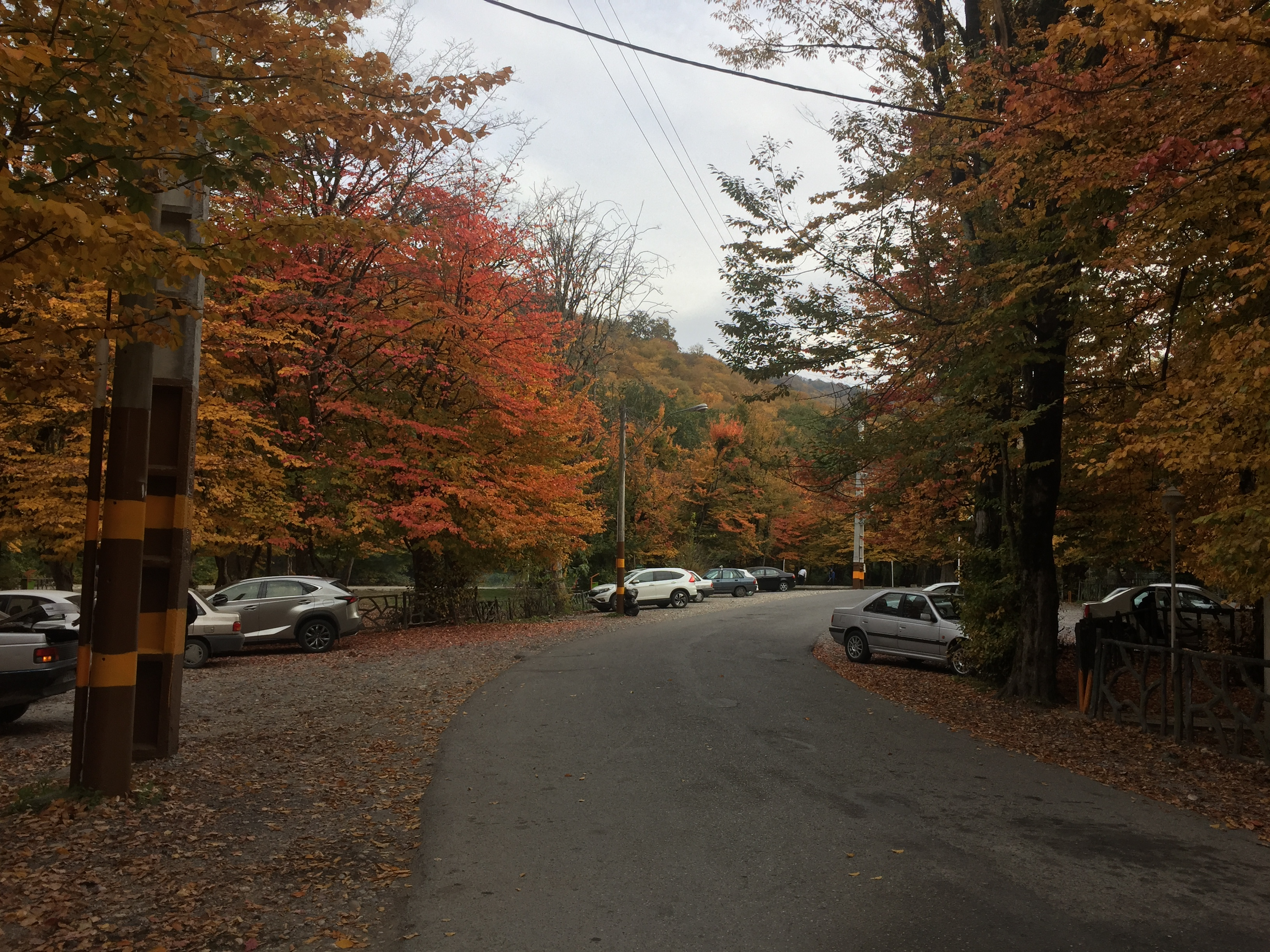
Alang Darreh in Autumn

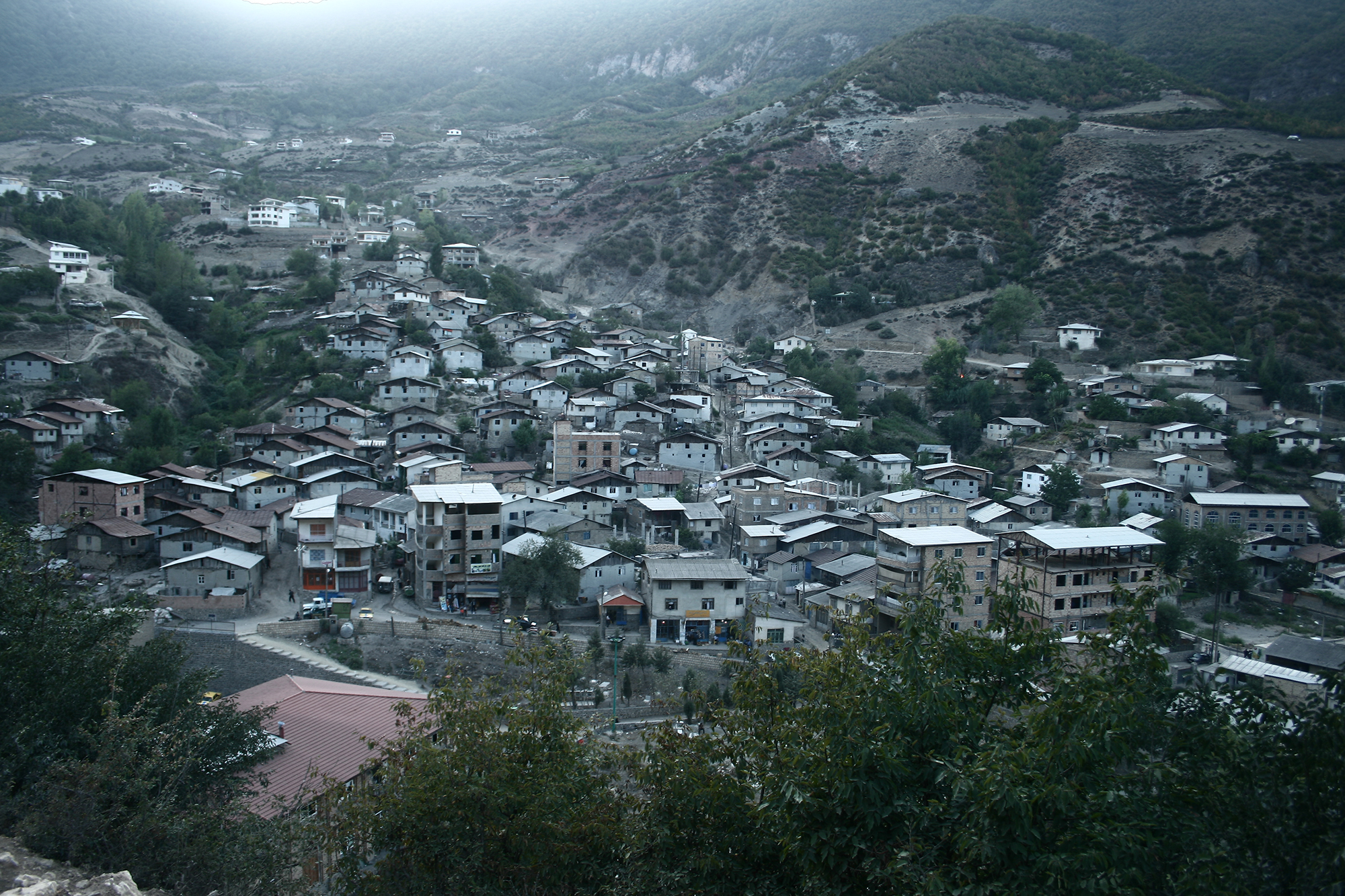
Ziarat Village

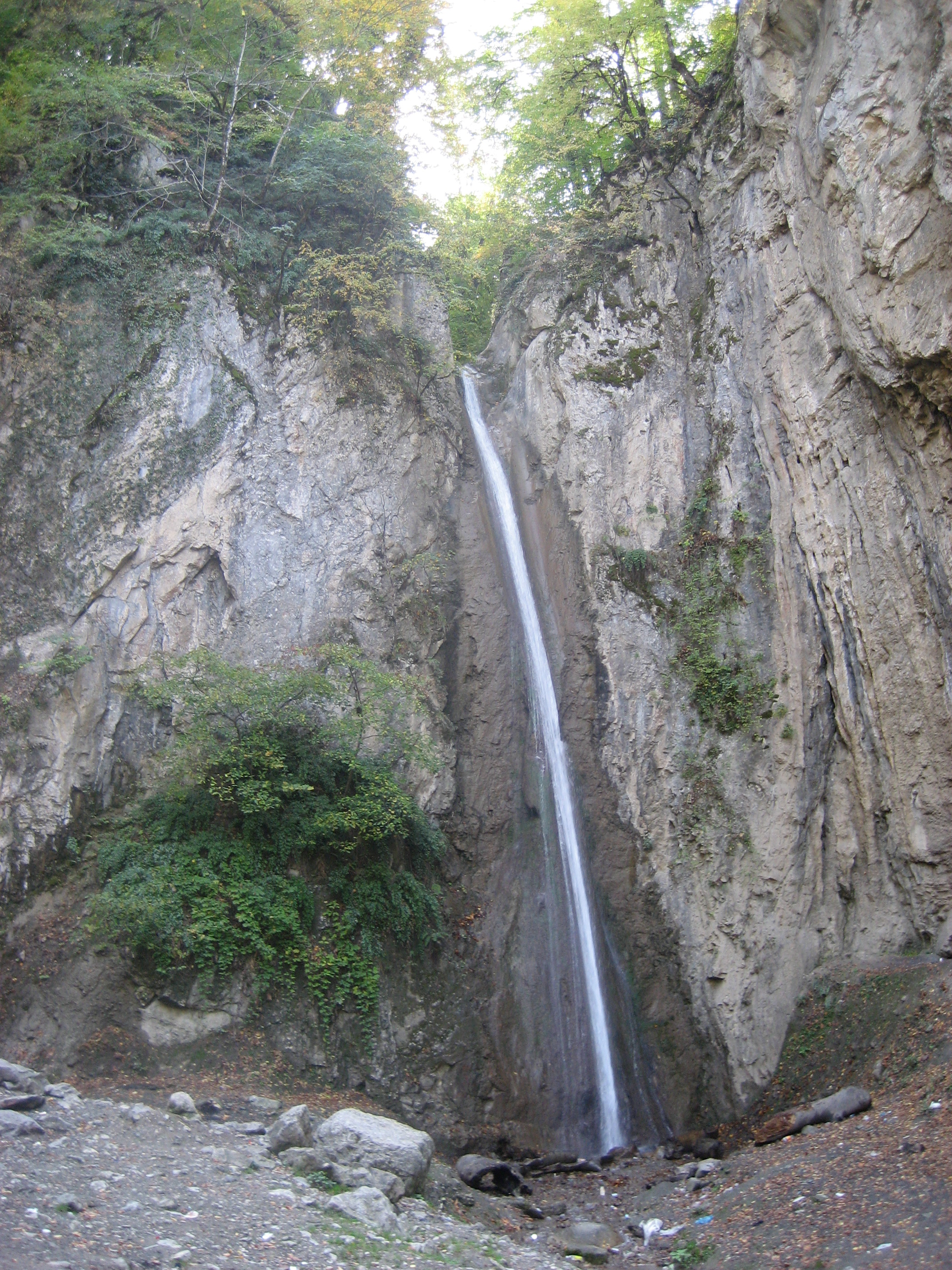
Ziarat Waterfall

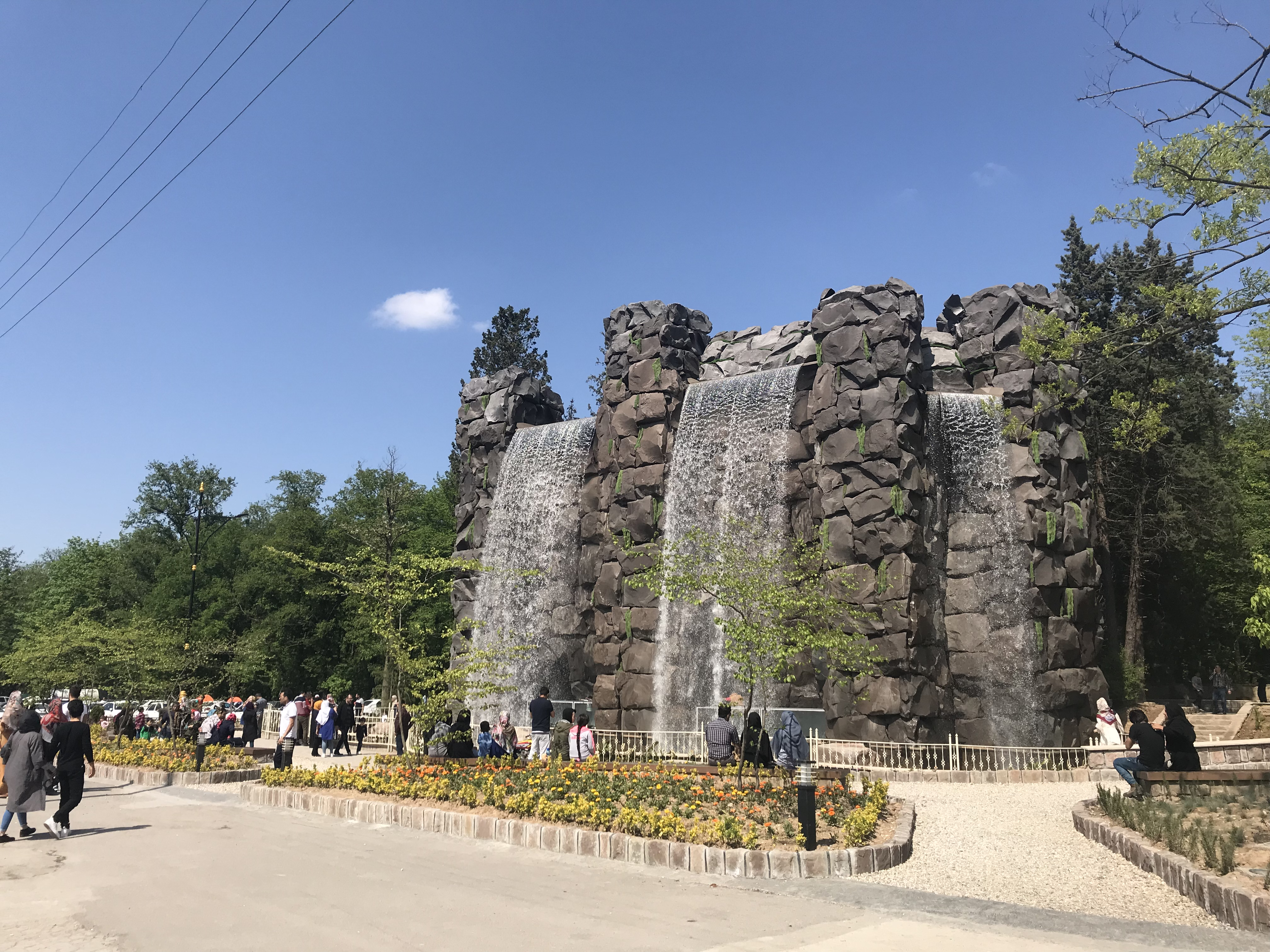
NaharKhoran Artificial Waterfall
