= Anjirab Rural District =

Rural district in Golestan province, Iran

Anjirab Rural District Persian: دهستان انجيرآب
- Rural District
- Location within Iran
- Coordinates: 36°49′N 54°23′E
- Country: Iran
- Province: Golestan
- County: Gorgan
- District: Central
- Established: 1987
- Capital: Zangian

Population (2016)
  - Total: 26,959
- Time zone: UTC+3:30 (IRST)

Anjirab Rural District (Persian: دهستان انجيرآب) is in the Central District of Gorgan County, Golestan province, Iran. Its capital is the village of Zangian.

== Demographics ==
=== Population ===
At the time of the 2006 National Census, the rural district's population was 22,305 in 5,561 households. There were 27,955 inhabitants in 6,881 households at the following census of 2011. The 2016 census measured the population of the rural district as 26,959 in 7,376 households. The most populous of its 17 villages was Mohammadabad, with 5,192 people.

=== Other villages in the rural district ===
- Amirabad
- Ebrahimabad
- Fakhrabad va Golnad Tariki
- Fateh Bagh
- Karimabad
- Lamlang
- Mamai
- Owja Bon
- Qaleh Mahmud
- Sadabad
- Shir Aliabad
- Sistani Mahalleh
- Soleyman Tappeh
- Tushan
