= Jelin, Golestan =

City in Golestan province, Iran

Jelin Persian: جلين
- City
- Location within Iran
- Coordinates: 36°51′13″N 54°32′02″E
- Country: Iran
- Province: Golestan
- County: Gorgan
- District: Central
- Established as a city: 2007

Population (2016)
  - Total: 7,417
- Time zone: UTC+3:30 (IRST)

Jelin (Persian: جلين) (Note: Also romanized as Jelīn; formerly Jelin-e Olya (جلين عليا), also romanized as Jelīn-e ‘Olyā; also known as Jelīn-e Bālā) is a city in the Central District of Gorgan County, Golestan province, Iran, serving as the administrative center for Estarabad-e Jonubi Rural District.

== Demographics ==
=== Population ===
At the time of the 2006 National Census, Jelin's population, as Jelin-e Olya, was 7,071 in 1,827 households, when it was a village in Estarabad-e Jonubi Rural District. The following census in 2011 counted 7,753 people in 2,161 households, by which time the village had been converted to the city of Jelin. The 2016 census measured the population of the city as 7,417 people in 2,260 households.
