= Sistani (surname) =

Sistani is an Arabic surname. Notable people with the surname include:

- Ali al-Sistani (born 1930), Iraqi Shia Islamic scholar
- Farrukhi Sistani (c. 1000–c. 1040), Persian poet
- Muhammad-Ridha al-Sistani (born 1962), Iraqi Islamic scholar, son of Ali
