= Vahdapar va Arbandi Sistani =

Vahdapar va Arbandi Sistani واحدپرواربندي سيستاني
- Village
- Country: Iran
- Province: Kerman
- County: Bardsir
- Bakhsh: Central
- Rural District: Mashiz

Population (2006)
  - Total: 10
- Time zone: UTC+3:30 (IRST)
  - Summer (DST): UTC+4:30 (IRDT)

Vahdapar va Arbandi Sistani (Persian: واحدپرواربندي سيستاني, also Romanized as Vāḥdapar va Arbandī Sīstānī) is a village in Mashiz Rural District, in the Central District of Bardsir County, Kerman Province, Iran. At the 2006 census, its population was 10, in 4 families.
