= Central District (Gorgan County) =

District in Golestan province, Iran

Central District (Gorgan County) Persian: بخش مرکزی شهرستان گرگان
- District
- Location within Iran
- Coordinates: 36°43′N 54°29′E
- Country: Iran
- Province: Golestan
- County: Gorgan
- Capital: Gorgan

Population (2016)
  - Total: 432,110
- Time zone: UTC+3:30 (IRST)

The Central District of Gorgan County (Persian: بخش مرکزی شهرستان گرگان) is in Golestan province, Iran. Its capital is the city of Gorgan.

== History ==
The village of Jelin-e Olya was converted to the city of Jelin in 2007.

== Demographics ==
=== Population ===
At the time of the 2006 National Census, the district's population was 345,813 in 92,929 households. The following census in 2011 counted 413,948 people in 121,025 households. The 2016 census measured the population of the district as 432,110 inhabitants in 135,537 households.

=== Administrative divisions ===
Central District (Gorgan County) Population
| Administrative Divisions | 2006 | 2011 | 2016 |
|---|---|---|---|
| Anjirab RD | 22,305 | 27,955 | 26,959 |
| Estarabad-e Jonubi RD | 29,216 | 22,864 | 23,108 |
| Rushanabad RD | 25,066 | 25,840 | 23,950 |
| Gorgan (city) | 269,226 | 329,536 | 350,676 |
| Jelin (city) (Note: Formerly the village of Jelin-e Olya; became a city after the 2006 census) | | 7,753 | 7,417 |
| Total | 345,813 | 413,948 | 432,110 |
RD = Rural District
