= Gorgan County =

County in Golestan province, Iran

Gorgan County Persian: شهرستان گرگان
- County
- Opening of the Gorgan Tower

- Location of Gorgan County in Golestan province (bottom, yellow)

- Location of Golestan province in Iran
- Coordinates: 36°47′N 54°30′E
- Country: Iran
- Province: Golestan
- Capital: Gorgan
- Districts: Central, Baharan

Population (2016)
  - Total: 480,541
- Time zone: UTC+3:30 (IRST)

Gorgan County (Persian: شهرستان گرگان) is in Golestan province, Iran. Its capital is the city of Gorgan.

== History ==
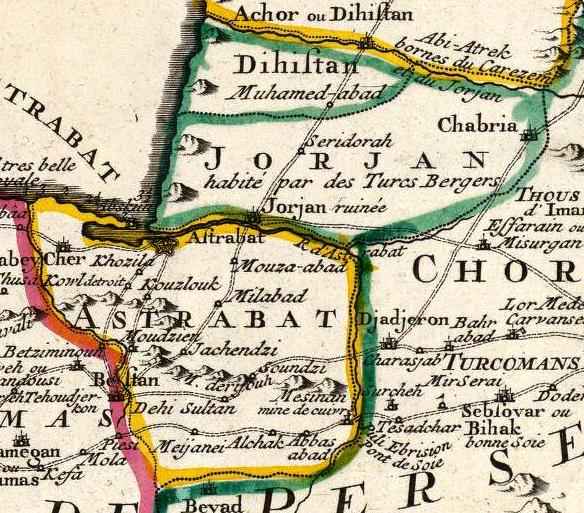
Map of neighboring countries of the Caspian Sea (1742)

The village of Jelin-e Olya was converted to the city of Jelin in 2007, and the village of Qoroq became a city in 2016.

== Demographics ==
=== Population ===
At the time of the 2006 census, the county's population was 393,887 in 105,120 households. The following census in 2011 counted 462,455 people in 135,112 households. The 2016 census measured the population of the county as 480,541 in 150,649 households.

=== Administrative divisions ===
Gorgan County's population history and administrative structure over three consecutive censuses are shown in the following table.

Gorgan County Population
| Administrative Divisions | 2006 | 2011 | 2016 |
|---|---|---|---|
| Central District | 345,813 | 413,948 | 432,110 |
| Anjirab RD | 22,305 | 27,955 | 26,959 |
| Estarabad-e Jonubi RD | 29,216 | 22,864 | 23,108 |
| Rushanabad RD | 25,066 | 25,840 | 23,950 |
| Gorgan (city) | 269,226 | 329,536 | 350,676 |
| Jelin (city) (Note: Formerly the village of Jelin-e Olya; became a city after the 2006 census) | | 7,753 | 7,417 |
| Baharan District | 48,074 | 48,507 | 48,409 |
| Estarabad-e Shomali RD | 17,553 | 17,680 | 17,513 |
| Qoroq RD | 24,014 | 24,139 | 23,307 |
| Qoroq (city) (Note: Became a city after the 2016 census) | | | |
| Sarkhon Kalateh (city) | 6,507 | 6,688 | 7,589 |
| Total | 393,887 | 462,455 | 480,541 |
RD = Rural District

== See also ==
Media related to Gorgan County at Wikimedia Commons
