= List of caves in Iran =

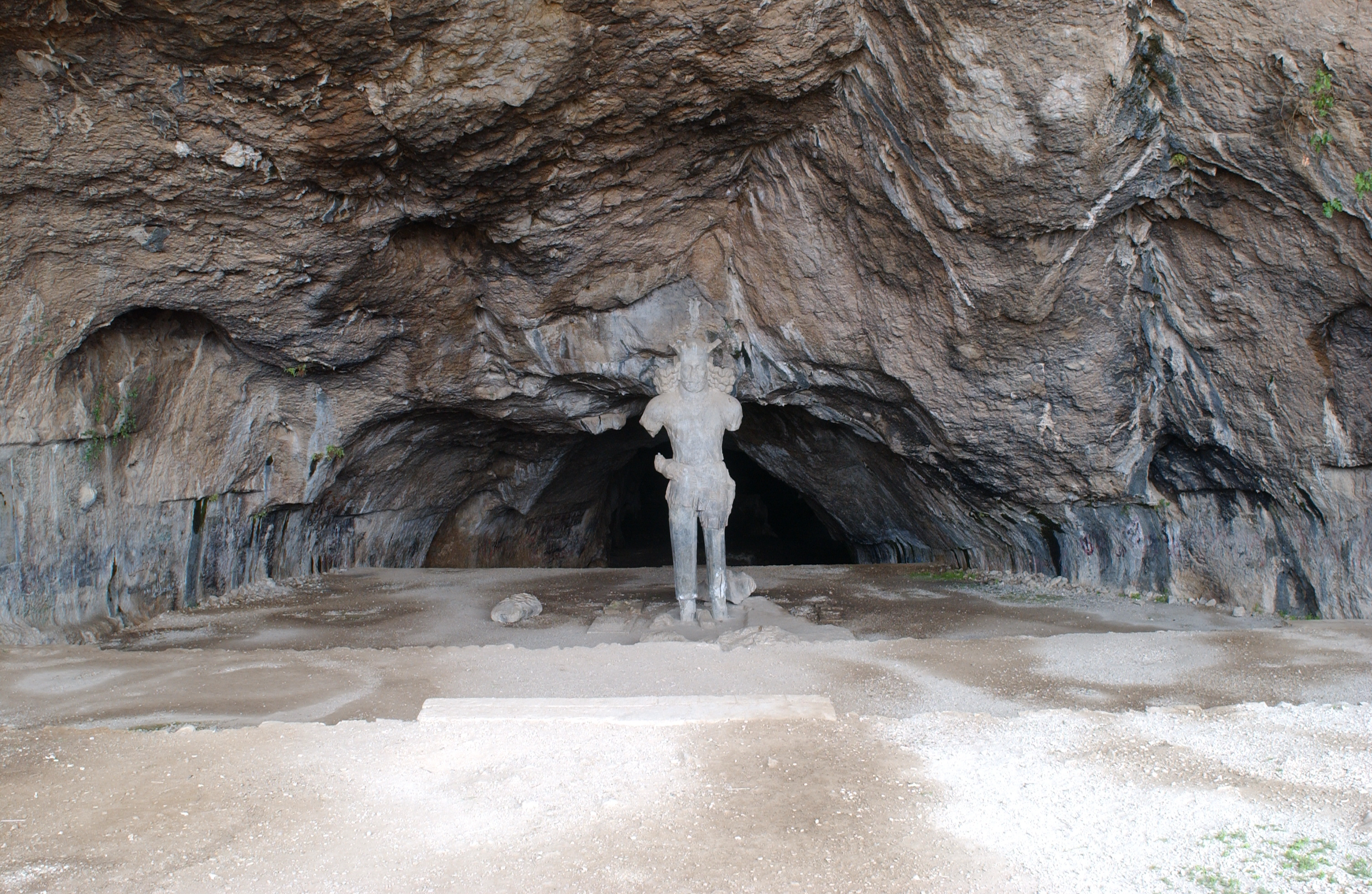
Statue of Shapur I in the Shapur Cave

A cave or cavern is a natural void in the ground, specifically a space large enough for a human to enter. Caves often form by the weathering of rock and often extend deeply underground. The word cave can also refer to much smaller openings such as sea caves, rock shelters, and grottos, though strictly speaking a cave is exogene, meaning it is deeper than its opening is wide, and a rock shelter is endogene.

== List of caves in Iran ==
Name	Location	Picture	Notes
Ali-Sadr Cave	Kabudarahang County		Ali-Sadr is the world's largest water cave, where you sit in a boat and watch the view. This cave is located at 48°18'E 35°18'N, in the southern part of Ali Sadr village. The cave is entered at the side of a hill called Sari Ghiyeh which also includes two other caves called Sarab and Soubashi, each 7 and 11 kilometers from Ali-Sadr Cave. Apparently, the water in Ali-Sadr cave stems from a spring in Sarab. In the summer of 2001, a German/British expedition surveyed the cave, finding to be 11 kilometers long.
Atashgah Manmade-Cave	Kashmar		The Atashgah Cave is located 20 km northwest of Kashmar city, Iran and the cave has two entrance passages.
Bisitun Cave	Harsin County		Bisitun Cave is an archaeological site of prehistoric human habitation in the Zagros Mountains in the Kermanshah province, north-west Iran. Bisitun Cave is one of five caves situated at the base of The Rock of Bisitun, a 1300m high cliff within the Chamchamal Plain. It was first excavated in 1949 by Carlton Coon, and is notable for the discovery of Mousterian stone tools of the Middle Paleolithic, as well as the remains of 109 identifiable species of Pleistocene mammals, and hominid remains.
Chapalak Cave	Gilan Province		Chapalak Cave is a Late Paleolithic site located at the Amarlou region, in the Gilan Province, northern Iran. The cave contains evidence for late Paleolithic human cave occupation. Stone artifacts and animal remains were excavated by an Iranian-Korean team in 2008. They found lithic artifacts (14 pieces: cores and blades/bladelets) in the upper most layer of the test pit that based on their techno-typological characteristics attributed to the Late Paleolithic period.
Darband Cave	Rudbar County		Darband Cave is a Lower Paleolithic site in the Gilan Province in northern Iran, located on the north side of a deep tributary canyon of the Siahrud River, a tributary of the Sefīd-Rūd River that flows into the Caspian Sea. The cave contains evidence for the earliest prehistoric human cave occupation during the Lower Paleolithic in Iran. Stone artifacts and animal fossils were discovered by a group of Iranian archaeologists of the Department of Paleolithic of the National Museum of Iran and ICHTO of Gilan. The site dates back to the late Middle Pleistocene period.
Darone Cave	Bardaskan County		Darone Cave is a cave in Bardaskan County, Iran. It is located in Cave Doruneh, Bardaskan.
Dashkasan	Soltaniyeh		Dashkasan is a three cave complex located south-east of Soltaniyeh. Outside the caves there is a temple called Dragon Stone of Dash Kasan Caves which was built by order of Mongol king Öljaitü in the early fourteenth century. The temple was built by four Chinese craftsmen. The architecture of Dash Kasan caves looks like an incomplete rectangle.
Deragon Cave	Sarayan		The Deragon Cave is the deepest cave in Khorasan, located in South Khorasan, Iran near Sarayan.
Do-Ashkaft Cave	Kermanshah		The Do-Ashkaft Cave, being a Middle Paleolithic cave site, is located north of Kermanshah, near Taq-e Bostan, Iran about 1,600 m (5,200 ft) above sea level. Its entrance faces south of Meywala Mount, overlooking the national park of Kuhestan. The site was first visited in 1996 by Iranian researchers F. Biglari and S. Heydari-Guran and during the following four years a series of surface surveys were made at one-month intervals, which resulted in a rich collection of Middle Paleolithic lithic artifacts.
Eshkaft-e Salman	Elam		On the southwest side of the valley, 2.5 km from the town center of Izeh, southwest Iran, is the majestic “romantic grotto” of Shekaft-e Salman (“Salomon’s Cave”) where a waterfall cascades seasonally over a high cliff-face, passing across the entrance to a natural cave below. Its waters merge with the spring water flowing out of the cave. Four reliefs, Shekaft-e Salman (SSI-IV), were carved inside and to the right of the mouth of the cave. Similarities with inscribed brick panels at Susa advocate a 12th century BC date for the first two reliefs (SSI and SS II), depicting royal families and probably carved in connection with cultic activities pursued by the Shutrukid House in the open-air highland sanctuaries.
Ghar Parau	Kermanshah		A British led caving expedition to the Zagros Mountains in 1971 led to the discovery of the cave. The cave was explored to a depth of 742 m by the time the expedition was forced to return to the surface. The explorers believed that the cave might go on much further, possibly surpassing the Gouffre de la Pierre-Saint-Martin system, which at that time was the world's deepest known cave.
Ghar Some	Nam-e Nik		So far, 21 wells have been discovered in Sam Cave with the efforts of mountaineering groups, of which 17 wells have been discovered by Qaboos Gonbad Mountaineering Group. Inside the cave are remnants of pottery from ancient times and skeletons. The mouth of the cave is located in an ancient site. Remains of human skeletons are also found in the opening vestibules of the cave. Sam Cave is the second deepest and second most dangerous cave in Iran. The name of this cave (Sam) in the local language means hole and cave.
Ghar-e-Pariyan	Isfahan.		Ghar-e-Pariyan is a cave near Isfahan. It is situated at an altitude of 2967 m above sea level. Its entrance measures approximately 1.6 x 1.2 meters. Its coordinates are "33°31′41.2″N 51°32′44.1″E".
Hotu and Kamarband Caves	Behshahr County		The Hotu and Kamarband Caves or Belt Caves are prehistoric archaeological sites in Iran. They are located 100 m (330 ft) apart, in a cliff on the slopes of the Alborz mountains in the village of Tarujen (currently called Shahid Abad), 5 km (3.1 mi) south west of Behshahr. Excavations took place led by Carleton S. Coon and were reported on between 1949 and 1957.
Kalahrod	Isfahan		Kalahrod Cave or Ghar-e-Chah-e-Vazmeh is a cave in Iran, situated in Isfahan Province at an elevation of 1450 meters above sea level. It is 33 kilometers north of the village Kalahrod or approximately 80 kilometers north of Isfahan. Near the cave there is a limestone well, that is 16 meters deep and 3 meters wide which has become a refuge habitat for rock pigeons.
Karaftu Caves	Divandarreh County		The Karaftu Caves are an ensemble of artificially cut rock chambers located in Divandarreh, Kurdistan Province, Iran. The cave complex dates back to the 3rd or 4th century BC and is of major importance due to its Greek inscription; "one of the very few examples preserved in situ" in Iran.
Katale Khor	Khodabandeh County		Katale Khor is a cave located in Zanjan Province, Iran. It is situated 120 km south of Zanjan city and is about 410 km from Tehran. The name, Katale Khor, means "mount of the sun". Geological studies in 1984 showed that the cave formation dates back to the Jurassic period. It is the longest cave of Iran and It is believed that the cave is connected to Ali Sadr Cave in Hamadan province. The road from Zanjan to Katale Khor passes Soltaniyeh, an ancient Ilkhanid city.
Nakhcheer	Markazi Province		Nakhcheer or Chal-Nakhjir is a cave situated in Markazi Province of Iran. It is a limestone cave approximately 70 million years old. Parts of the cave, including its internal lake, have been prepared for easy tourist access. It was discovered in 1989 and registered as a national monument in 2001. Its interior is made of crystals, dolomite sediments, stalactites and stalagmites.
Qal'eh Bozi	Isfahan		Qal'eh Bozi is a complex of caves sites located about 25 km (15.5 mi) south-southwest of Isfahan, Iran; northeast of Dizicheh and north of Hassanabad. The sites include two rock shelters and a cave located at altitudes between 1,750 and 1,810 m (5,741.5 and 5,938.3 ft) above sea level. The caves are found on the southern face of a limestone mountain of lower Cretaceous age that rises to more than 500 m (1,640.4 ft) above the plain floor. From the cave entrance there is a commanding view of the plain below and of the Zaiandeh Rud River flowing about 2 km (1.2 mi) to the south and southeast.
Quri Qala Cave	Ravansar		Quri Qala Cave or QuraQala is a cave located northwest of Ravansar, Iran, and is one of the longest caves in western Asia. First explored in the 1950s, in 1989 it was further opened by an Iranian team. It contains three main chambers, with calcite crystals, stalactites and waterfalls. It is known for its colony of Mouse-eared bat, and for a number of archaeological finds, including silver vessels dating to the late Sassanian period.
Roodafshan Cave	Damavand County		The Roodafshan Cave, or Ghar-e Roodafshan, is a solutional cave located in Roodafshan valley, Damavand County, Tehran Province, Iran, in the Alborz mountains. Since 2003, the Verein für Höhlenkunde in Obersteier (Austria) with the Khaneye Koohnavardan-e-Tehran (Iran) has been surveying Roodafshan Cave.
Sangtarashan Cave	Jahrom		Sangtarashan Cave, (also known as Sangshekanan Cave and Sangeshkan Cave) is located in the Jahrom, in southern Iran. It is the largest handmade cave in the world. It has several corridors, columns and openings. This cave dates back to 150 years ago and is regarded as the largest artificial cave in the world. The cave lies to the south of Jahrom.
Shafaq Cave	Meymand		Shafaq is a deep cave located 142 km south of Shiraz, near Meymand, the village of flowers. This cave lies in a huge mountain and has two entrances eastward. At sunrise, the sunray is broken in the cave's porticos and reflects colorful beams. The end of this cave has not yet been detected. The attractions of visiting this area are a stunning, lengthy cave and Meymand village within fragrant flower gardens.
Shapur Cave	Kazerun		Shapur Cave/ Shapour Cave is located in the Zagros Mountains, in southern Iran, about 6 km from the ancient city of Bishapur. This cave is near Kazerun in the Chogan valley, which was the site of polo (Persian čōgān چُوگان), in the Sasanian period. In the cave, on the fourth of five terraces, stands the statue of Shapur I, the second ruler of the Sasanid Empire. The statue was carved from one stalagmite. The height of the statue is 7 metres and its shoulders are 2 m wide, and its arms are 3 m long.
Shirabad Cave	Gorgan		Shirabad Cave is located in the direction of Shirabad-waterfall in Khanbebin. It is a natural cave in Gorgan province, Fenderesk, Khanbehbin at a height above the Waterfall shirabad in Shirabad.
Sir Cave	Sir		Sir Cave is a cave in Sir village of the Central District of Bardaskan County in Razavi Khorasan Province. The cave was inhabited in the past and was used as a shelter. Sir Cave is located on a rocky mountain with a height of about 80 meters and about 1608 meters above sea level. It is difficult to reach.
Wezmeh	Eslamabad-e Gharb		Large numbers of animal fossil remains have been discovered so far. The earliest and the latest dates obtained on animal bones are 70,000 years BP and 11,000 years BP, respectively. The animal remains belong to red fox, spotted hyena, brown bear, wolf, lion, leopard, wild cat, equids, rhinoceros, wild boar, deer, aurochs, wild goat and sheep etc. The faunal remains were studied by Marjan Mashkour and her colleagues at the Natural History Museum in Paris and the osteological department of National Museum of Iran.
Yafteh	Khorramabad		Yafteh has yielded the largest number of C14 dates from a single Paleolithic site in Iran that are clustered around 28–35 thousand years ago. A rich collection of ornaments made of marine shells, tooth and hematite has been discovered in the early Upper Paleolithic deposits in both early and recent excavations in the Yafteh cave. This collection was analyzed and published by Sonia Shidrang in the Iranian Journal of Archaeology and History.
