= Kaldar Cave =

Cave in Lorestan Province, Iran

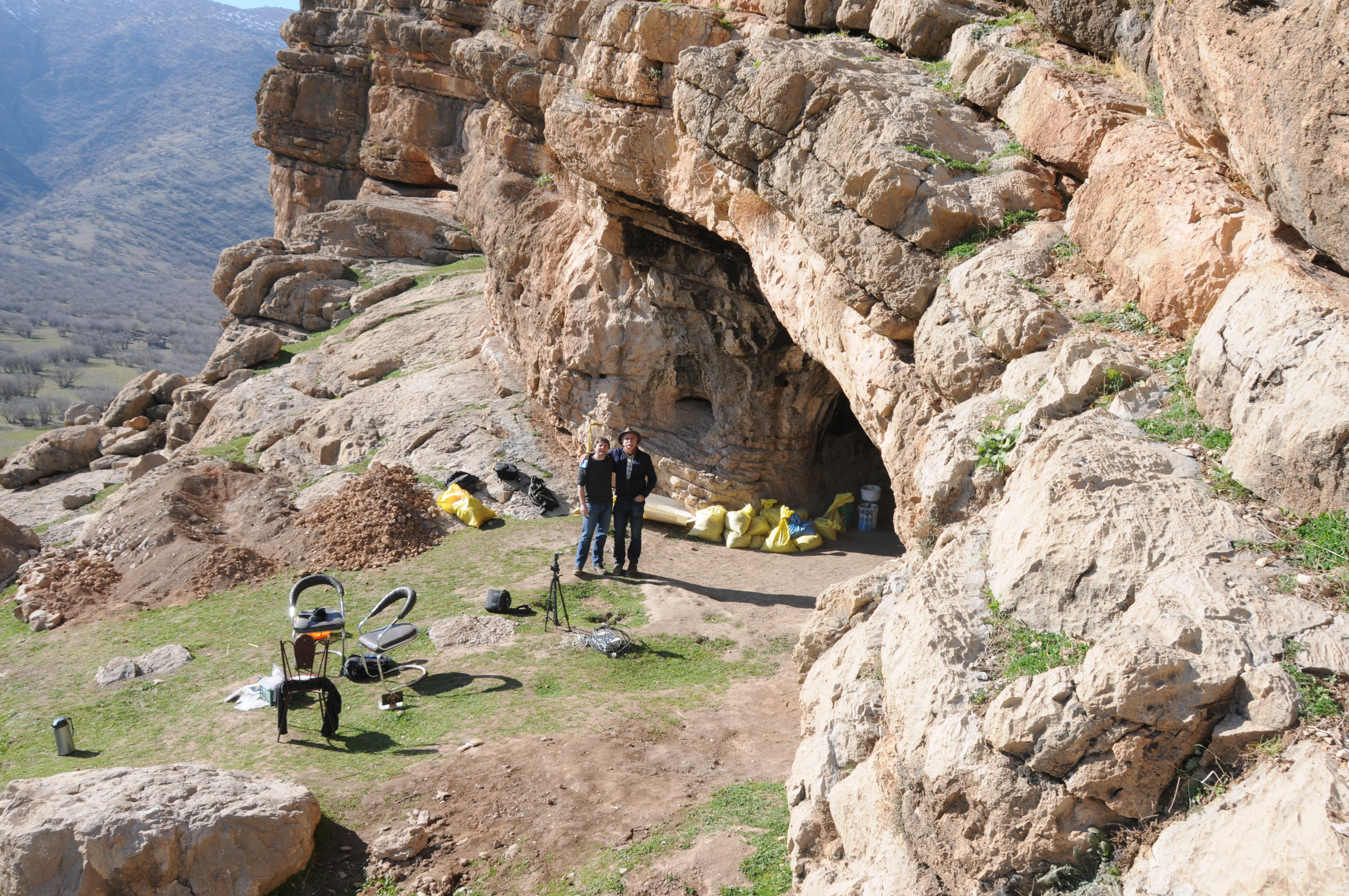
- A view of Kalder Cave and two archaeologists from the Iranian-Spanish expedition
- Interactive map of Kaldar Cave
- Location: Khorramabad County, Lorestan province, Iran
- Coordinates: 33°33′26″N 48°17′34″E
- Entrances: 1
- Access: Closed

Kaldar Cave (Persian: غار کلدر) is a cave in Khorramabad County, Iran. It is one of the prehistoric caves in the Khorramabad Valley within which humans resided as early as 63,000 years ago.

There have been efforts for establishing a chronology for this cave. In 2014–2015, cultural remains – which are mainly connected with anatomically modern humans and evidence for some industry made probably by Neanderthals in the basal layers of the site – were discovered by excavations done at the cave. The cave is thought of as a key archaeological site which provides evidence for the transition from the Middle to Upper Palaeolithic age in Iran.

== See also ==
- List of caves in Iran
