= Namin =

Namin may refer to:

- Namin County in Iran
- Namin, Ardabil the capital of Namin County
- Nam-e Nik, also known as Namin
- Stas Namin (born 1951), Russian rock musician
- Namin or Namin faction, a political faction during the Joseon dynasty
