= Pariyan =

Pariyan (Persian: پريان) may refer to:

- Pariyan, Hamadan
- Pariyan, Kermanshah

== See also ==
- Ghar-e-Pariyan, a cave near Isfahan
