= Ghar Some =

Limestone cave in Iran, second deepest

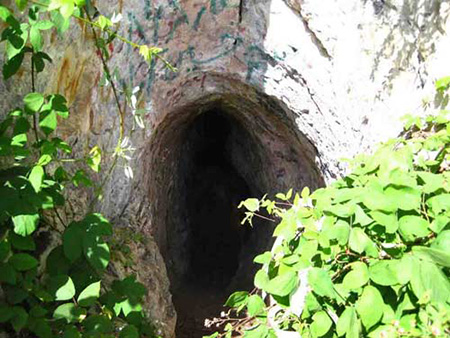
- The entrance to Sam's Cave
- Interactive map of Ghar Some
- Location: Nam-e Nik, Semnan Province, Iran
- Coordinates: 37°07′34″N 55°41′03″E
- Length: 1.70 km
- Discovery: 2010
- Geology: Limestone
- Difficulty: Much
- Hazards: Vertical wells

Ghar Some, also spelled Ghar Sam (Persian: غار سم), is a limestone cave at an altitude of 1,700 meters of Khajeh Ghanbar Mountain (Imamzadeh on top of the mountain) in Namij area of Nam-e nik village, Iran. The natural cave is made of limestone, and has expanded as water flows through the limestone rocks. Ghar Some is the second deepest cave in Iran.

== History ==
So far, 21 wells have been discovered in Ghar Some with the efforts of mountaineering groups, of which 17 wells have been discovered by Qaboos Gonbad Mountaineering Group.

Inside the cave are remnants of pottery from ancient times and skeletons. The mouth of the cave is located in an ancient site. Remains of human skeletons are also found in the opening vestibules of the cave. Ghar Some is the second deepest and second most dangerous cave in Iran. One name of this cave (Ghar Sam) in the local language means hole and cave.

== Pictures ==
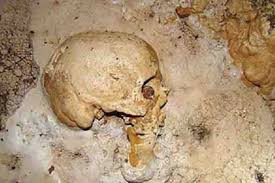

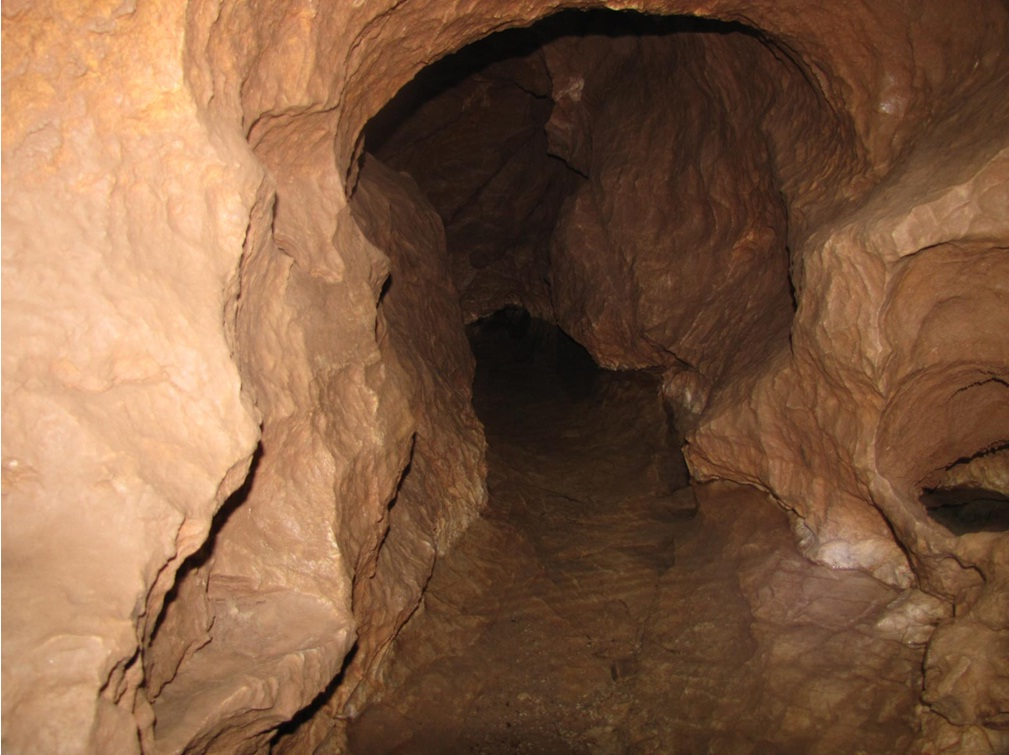

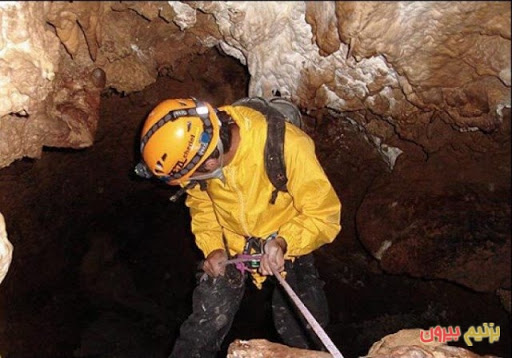

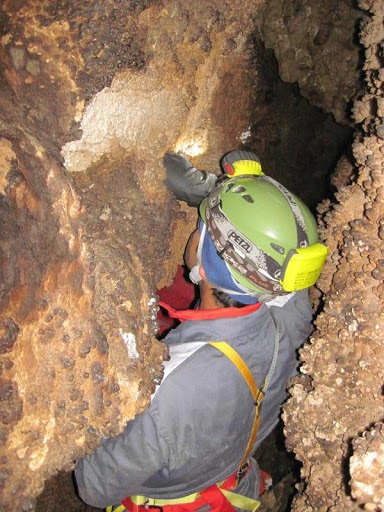

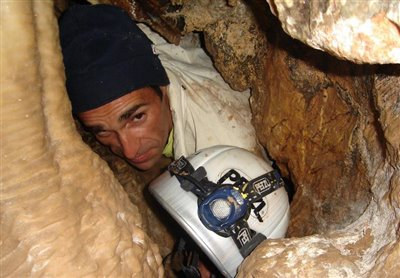

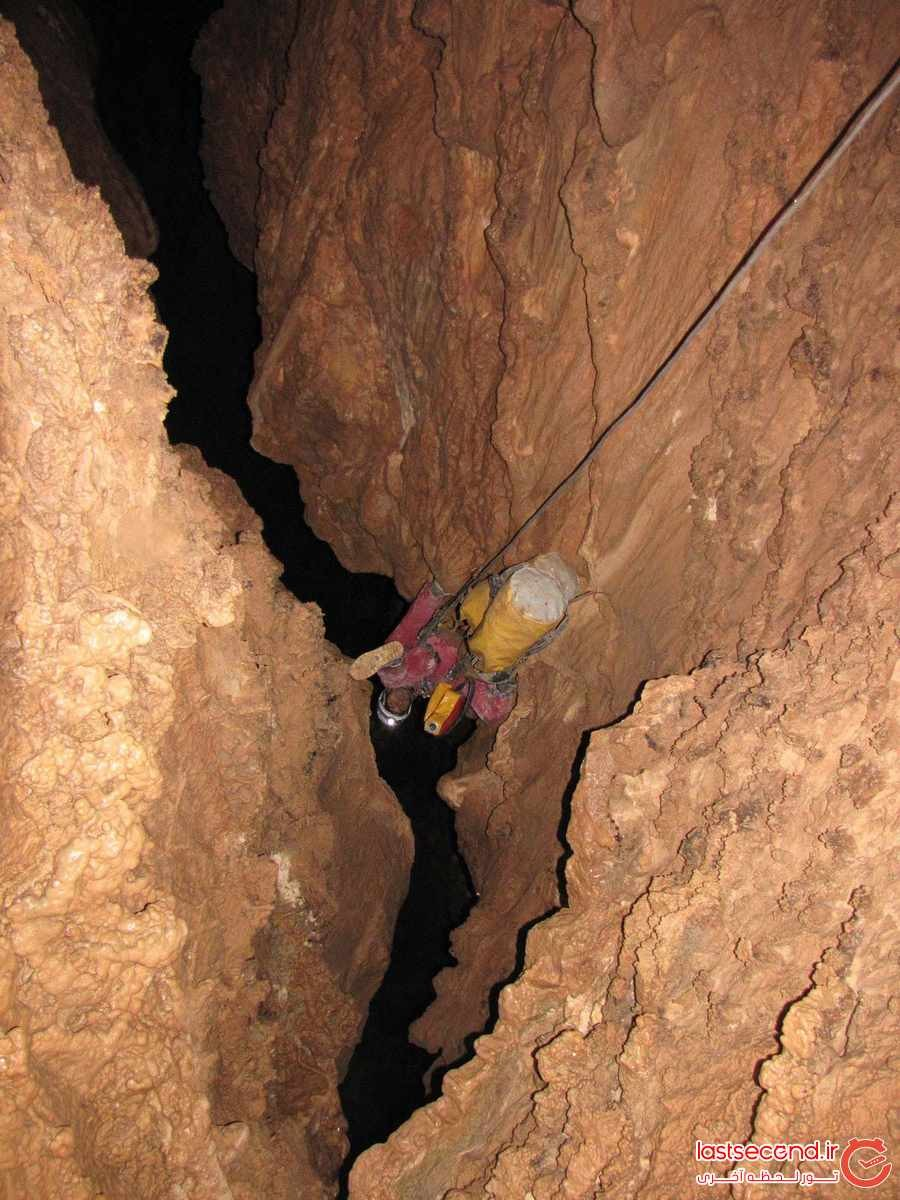
