= Kalahrod =

Cave in Isfahan Province, Iran

Kalahrod cave (pronounced as /uː/, most commonly Romanized as Kalahrud or Kalahroud) or Ghar-e-Chah-e-Vazmeh is a cave in Iran, situated in Isfahan Province at an elevation of 1,450 metres (4,760 ft) above sea level. It is 33 kilometres (21 mi) north of the village of Kalahrod and approximately 80 kilometres (50 mi) north of Isfahan. Near the cave there is a limestone well, that is 16 metres (52 ft) deep and 3 metres (9.8 ft) wide which has become a refuge habitat for rock pigeons. Explored passages within Kalahrud Cave extend for approximately 4503 meters, as recorded in surveys.

== See also ==
- List of caves in Iran
- Geography of Iran
- Tourism in Iran
- Iranian architecture
