= Ghar Parau =

Limestone cave in Western Iran

Porow Cave
- Interactive map of Porow Cave
- Location: Zagros Mountains, Iran
- Coordinates: 34°24′44″N 47°14′38″E
- Depth: 751 m (2,464 ft)
- Length: 1.36 km (0.85 mi)
- Discovery: 1971
- Geology: Limestone
- Difficulty: High
- Hazards: Vertical pitch

Porow Cave (Persian: غار پراو) is a limestone cave in the Zagros Mountains, north of Kermanshah in Western Iran. At 751 m deep, it is the deepest cave in Iran. Joujar Cave has been reported as the second deepest, at 568 m deep.

== History ==
A British-led caving expedition to the Zagros Mountains in 1971 led to the discovery of the cave. The cave was explored to a depth of 742 m when the expedition was forced to return to the surface. The explorers believed that the cave might go on much further, possibly surpassing the Gouffre de la Pierre-Saint-Martin system, which at that time was the world's deepest known cave.

The team returned the following year and passed their previous limit, but to their great disappointment, the cave sumped almost immediately at a depth of 751 m and could be explored no further. To be "Ghar Paraued" became a term used in British caving for a small, disappointing breakthrough following the great effort to discover new passage.
