= Geography of Iran =

Coordinates: 32°00′N 53°00′E

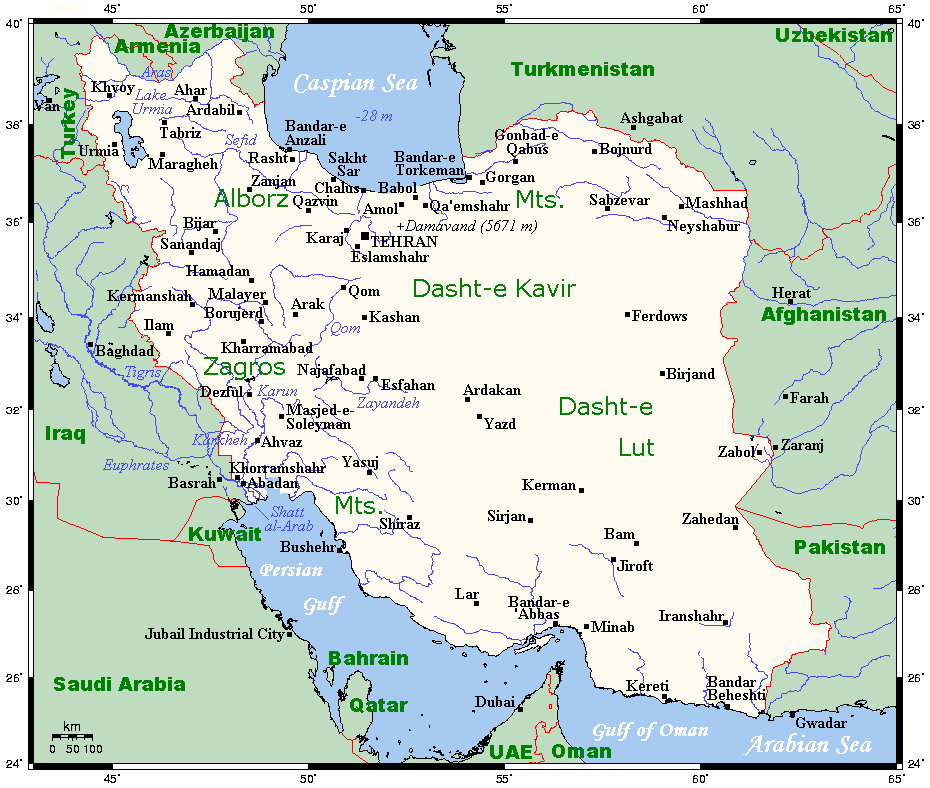
- Continent: Asia
- Region: West Asia / South Asia (Iranian plateau)
- Coordinates: 32°00'N, 53°00'E
- Area: Ranked 17th
  - Total: 1,648,195 km^{2} (636,372 sq mi)
  - Land: 99.27%
  - Water: 0.73%
- Coastline: 2,815 km (1,749 mi)
- Borders: Total land borders: 5,894 km (3,662 mi); Afghanistan: 921 km (572 mi); Armenia: 44 km (27 mi); Azerbaijan (proper): 432 km (268 mi); Azerbaijan (Nakhchivan exclave): 179 km (111 mi); Iraq: 1,599 km (994 mi); Pakistan: 909 km (565 mi); Turkey: 534 km (332 mi); Turkmenistan: 1,148 km (713 mi)
- Highest point: Mount Damavand; 5,610 m (18,406 ft)
- Lowest point: Caspian Sea −28 m (−91.9 ft)
- Longest river: Karun
- Largest lake: Lake Urmia
- Exclusive economic zone: 168,718 km^{2} (65,142 mi^{2})

Geographically, the country of Iran is predominantly located on the Iranian plateau at the crossroads of West Asia and South Asia. Topographically, it borders the Caspian Sea, Persian Gulf, and Gulf of Oman. Its mountains have impacted both the political and the economic history of the country for several centuries. The mountains enclose several broad basins, on which major agricultural and urban settlements are located. Until the 20th century, when major highways and railroads were constructed through the mountains to connect the population centers, these basins tended to be relatively isolated from one another.

Iran map of Köppen climate classification zones

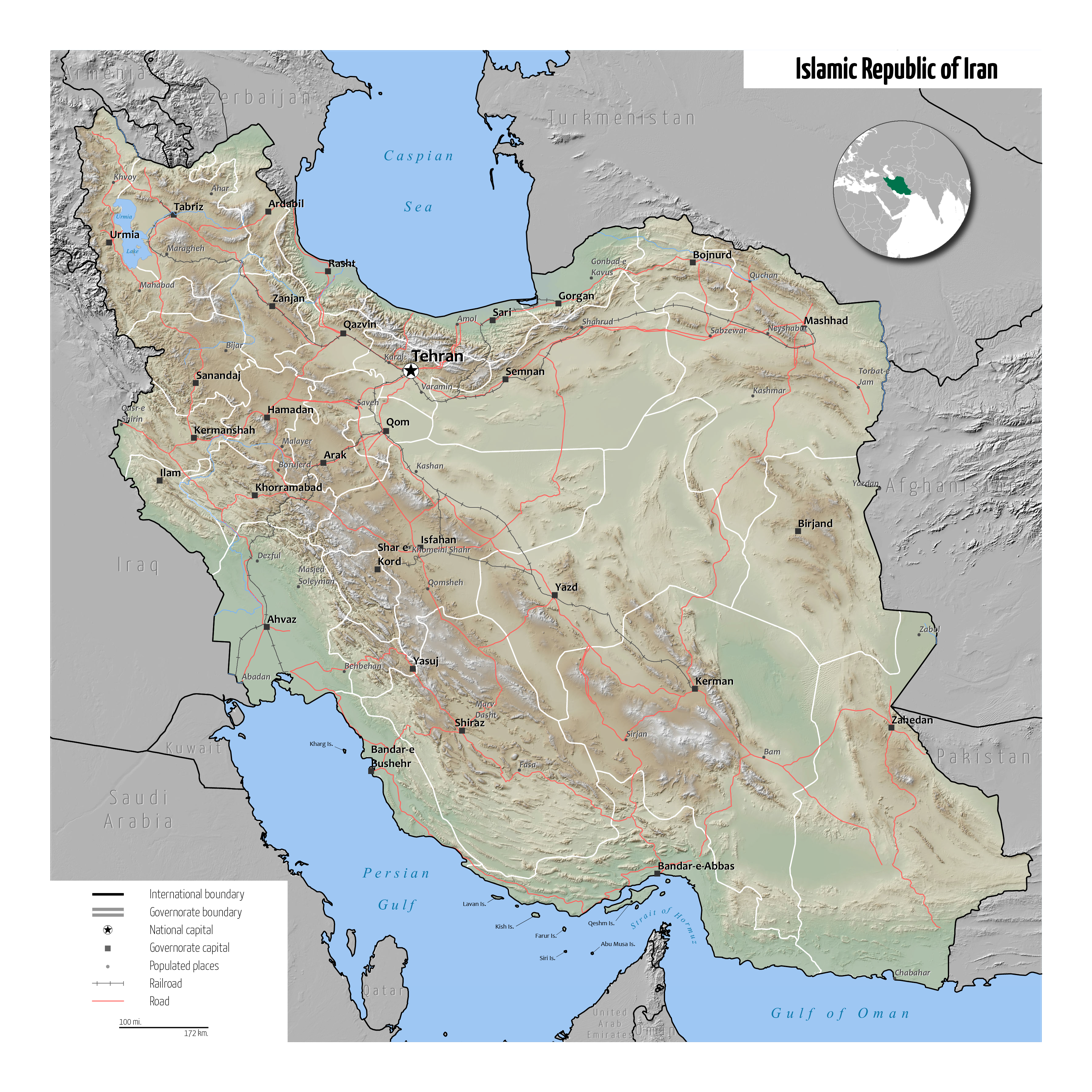
Locator map of Iran

Typically, one major town has dominated each basin, and there were complex economic relationships between the town and the hundreds of villages that surrounded it. In the higher elevations of the mountains rimming the basins, tribally organized groups practiced transhumance, moving with their herds of sheep and goats between traditionally established summer and winter pastures. There are no major river systems in the country, and historically transportation was by means of caravans that followed routes traversing gaps and passes in the mountains. The mountains also impeded easy access to the Persian Gulf and the Caspian Sea.

With an area of 1,648,195 square kilometres (636,372 sq mi), Iran ranks seventeenth in size among the countries of the world. Iran shares its northern borders with several post-Soviet states: Armenia, Azerbaijan, and Turkmenistan. These borders extend for more than 2,000 kilometres (1,200 mi), including nearly 650 kilometres (400 mi) of water along the southern shore of the Caspian Sea. Iran's western borders are with Turkey in the north and Iraq in the south, terminating at the Arvand Rud.

The Persian Gulf and Gulf of Oman littorals form the entire 1,770-kilometre (1,100 mi) southern border. To the east lie Afghanistan on the north and Pakistan on the far south. Iran's diagonal distance from the province of West Azerbaijan in the northwest to Sistan and Baluchestan province in the southeast is approximately 2,333 kilometres (1,450 mi).

== Topography ==
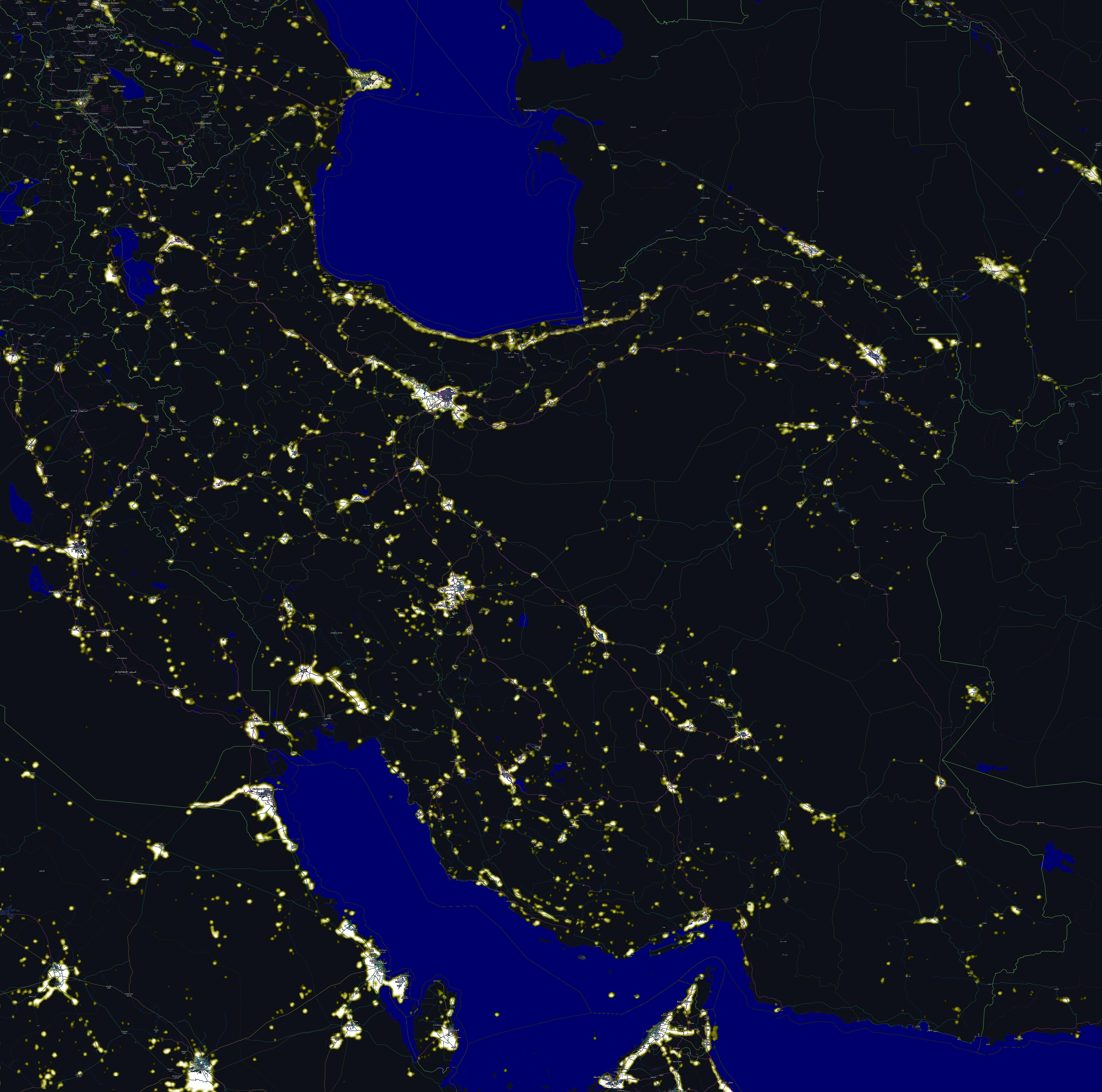
Iran at night

Topography of Iran

The topography of Iran consists of rugged, mountainous rims surrounding high interior basins. The main mountain chain is the Zagros Mountains, a series of parallel ridges interspersed with plains that bisect the country from northwest to southeast. Many peaks in the Zagros exceed 3,000 metres (9,843 ft) above sea level, and in the south-central region of the country there are at least five peaks that are over 4,000 metres (13,123 ft).

As the Zagros continue into southeastern Iran, the average elevation of the peaks declines dramatically to under 1,500 metres (4,921 ft). Rimming the Caspian Sea littoral is another chain of mountains, the narrow but high Alborz Mountains. Volcanic Mount Damavand, 5,610 metres (18,406 ft), located in the center of the Alborz, is not only the country's highest peak but also the second highest mountain on the Eurasian landmass west of the Hindu Kush, after Mount Elbrus.

The center of Iran consists of several closed basins that collectively are referred to as the Central Plateau. The average elevation of this plateau is about 900 metres (2,953 ft), but several of the mountains that tower over the plateau exceed 3,000 metres (9,843 ft). The eastern part of the plateau is covered by two salt deserts, the Dasht-e Kavir (Great Salt Desert) and the Dasht-e Lut. Except for some scattered oases, these deserts are uninhabited.

Parts of northwestern Iran are part of the Armenian highlands, which adjoins it topographically with other parts of neighbouring Turkey, Armenia, Azerbaijan, and Georgia.

Iran has only two expanses of lowlands: the Khuzestan Plain in the southwest and the Caspian Sea coastal plain in the north. The former is a roughly triangular-shaped extension of the Mesopotamia plain and averages about 160 kilometres (99 mi) in width. It extends for about 120 kilometres (75 mi) inland, barely rising a few meters above sea level, then meets abruptly with the first foothills of the Zagros. Much of the Khuzestan plain is covered with marshes.

The Caspian plain is both longer and narrower. It extends for some 640 kilometres (400 mi) along the Caspian shore, but its widest point is less than 50 kilometres (31 mi), while at some places less than 2 kilometres (1.2 mi) separate the shore from the Alborz foothills. The Persian Gulf coast south of Khuzestan and the Gulf of Oman coast have no real plains because the Zagros in these areas come right down to the shore.

There are no major rivers in the country. Of the small rivers and streams, the only one that is navigable is the 830 kilometres (520 mi)-long Karun, which shallow-draft boats can negotiate from Khorramshahr to Ahvaz, a distance of about 180 kilometres (110 mi). Other notable rivers include the Karkheh, spanning 700 kilometres (430 mi) and joining the Tigris; and the Zayandeh River, which is 300 kilometres (190 mi) long. Several other permanent rivers and streams also drain into the Persian Gulf, while a number of small rivers that originate in the northwestern Zagros or Alborz drain into the Caspian Sea.

On the Central Plateau, numerous rivers—most of which have dry beds for the greater part of the year—form from snow melting in the mountains during the spring and flow through permanent channels, draining eventually into salt lakes that also tend to dry up during the summer months. There is a permanent salt lake, Lake Urmia (the traditional name, also cited as Lake Urmiyeh, to which it has reverted after being called Lake Rezaiyeh under Mohammad Reza Shah), in the northwest, whose brine content is too high to support fish or most other forms of aquatic life. There are also several connected salt lakes along the Iran-Afghanistan border in the province of Baluchestan va Sistan.

Iran's highlands are home to some of the world's most unexpected glaciers. Their appearance in the dry environment is advantageous for those who depend on glacial ice as a supply of fresh water. In an expedition, Klaus Thymann together with the environmental charity Project Pressure produced a series of archive and expedition photographs that depict the urgency of the situation surrounding climate change and the individuals who rely on such natural ice forms to sustain life in remote areas.

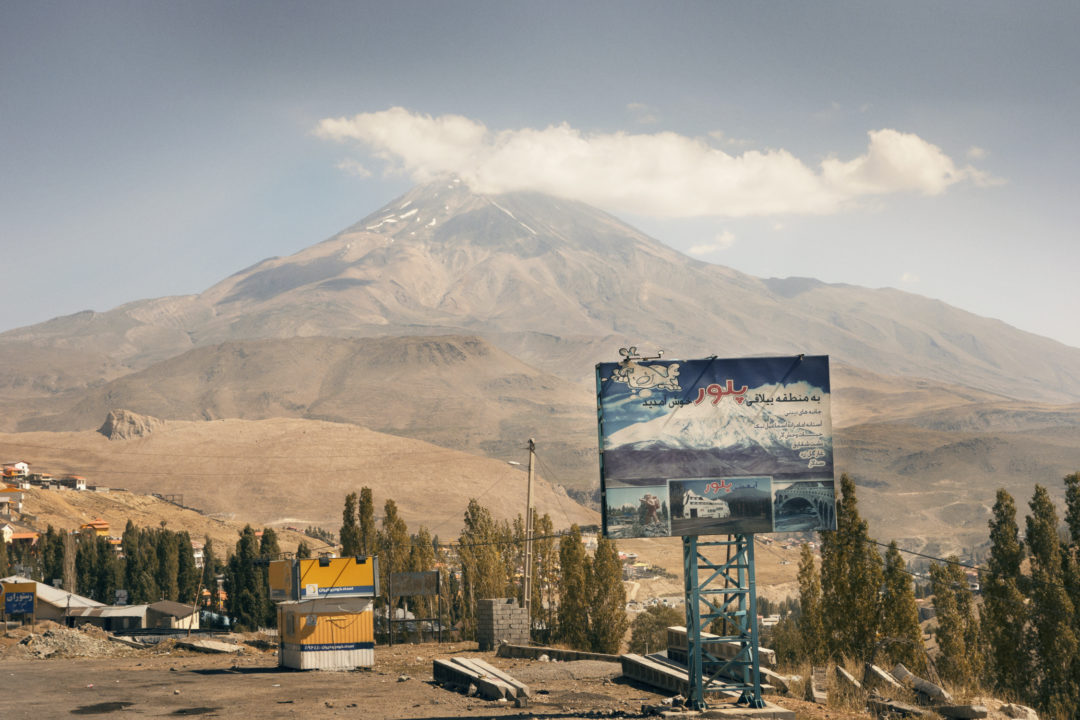
Mount Damavand. Photo by Klaus Thymann, 2014.

A recent global remote sensing analysis suggested that there were 1,481 km^{2} of tidal flats in Iran, making it the 22nd ranked country in terms of tidal flat area.

== Climate ==
Iran has a diverse climate. In the northwest, winters are cold with heavy snowfalls and sub-freezing temperatures. Spring and fall are relatively mild, while summers are dry and hot. In the south, winters are mild and summers are very hot, with average daily maximum temperature exceeding 38 °C (100.4 °F) in the month of July. On the Khuzestan Plain, summer heat is accompanied by high humidity.

In general, Iran has a temperate climate in which most of the relatively scant annual precipitation falls from October through April. In most of the country, yearly precipitation averages 400 millimetres (15.7 in) or less. The major exceptions are the higher mountain valleys of the Zagros and the Caspian coastal plain, where precipitation averages at least 600 millimetres (24 in) and is in the form of snow at high altitudes. In the western part of the Caspian, rainfall exceeds 1,500 millimetres (59 in) annually and is distributed relatively evenly throughout the year. This contrasts with some basins of the Central Plateau that receive 100 millimetres (4 in) or less of precipitation. Iran is considered colder than neighboring countries such as Iraq and Turkmenistan, due to its higher elevation.

Iran climate map showing locations of province capitals	Caspian mild and wet Caspian mild Mediterranean with spring rains Mediterranean Cold mountains Very cold mountains Cold semi-desert Hot semi-desert Dry desert Hot dry desert Hot coastal dry Coastal dry

=== Examples ===
Climate data for Tehran Mehrabad – Altitude: 1190.8 m (1951–2010)
Month	Jan	Feb	Mar	Apr	May	Jun	Jul	Aug	Sep	Oct	Nov	Dec	Year
Record high °C (°F)	19.6 (67.3)	23.0 (73.4)	29.4 (84.9)	33.4 (92.1)	37.0 (98.6)	41.0 (105.8)	43.0 (109.4)	42.0 (107.6)	38.0 (100.4)	33.4 (92.1)	26.4 (79.5)	21.0 (69.8)	43.0 (109.4)
Mean daily maximum °C (°F)	7.9 (46.2)	10.6 (51.1)	15.7 (60.3)	22.2 (72.0)	28.0 (82.4)	34.0 (93.2)	36.7 (98.1)	35.7 (96.3)	31.6 (88.9)	24.5 (76.1)	16.3 (61.3)	10.1 (50.2)	22.8 (73.0)
Daily mean °C (°F)	3.8 (38.8)	6.0 (42.8)	10.7 (51.3)	16.8 (62.2)	22.1 (71.8)	27.5 (81.5)	30.3 (86.5)	29.5 (85.1)	25.5 (77.9)	19.0 (66.2)	11.6 (52.9)	5.9 (42.6)	17.4 (63.3)
Mean daily minimum °C (°F)	−0.4 (31.3)	1.4 (34.5)	5.7 (42.3)	11.4 (52.5)	16.3 (61.3)	21.1 (70.0)	24.0 (75.2)	23.4 (74.1)	19.4 (66.9)	13.5 (56.3)	6.8 (44.2)	1.8 (35.2)	12.0 (53.7)
Record low °C (°F)	−15.0 (5.0)	−13.0 (8.6)	−8.0 (17.6)	−4.0 (24.8)	2.4 (36.3)	5.0 (41.0)	14.0 (57.2)	13.0 (55.4)	9.0 (48.2)	2.8 (37.0)	−7.0 (19.4)	−13.0 (8.6)	−15.0 (5.0)
Average precipitation mm (inches)	34.6 (1.36)	33.2 (1.31)	39.6 (1.56)	31.9 (1.26)	14.8 (0.58)	3.0 (0.12)	2.2 (0.09)	1.7 (0.07)	1.2 (0.05)	10.7 (0.42)	26.1 (1.03)	33.7 (1.33)	232.7 (9.18)
Average precipitation days	9.0	8.6	10.7	10.8	8.8	3.1	2.1	1.3	1.1	5.3	7.2	8.6	76.6
Average snowy days	5.1	2.9	1.1	0.1	0.0	0.0	0.0	0.0	0.0	0.0	0.4	2.7	12.3
Average relative humidity (%)	64	56	47	40	33	25	26	26	27	36	49	62	41
Mean monthly sunshine hours	168.8	179.8	203.0	220.6	287.0	346.3	345.9	333.6	302.8	249.9	202.9	168.9	3,009.5
Average ultraviolet index	2	3	3	5	6	7	7	7	5	4	3	2	5
Source 1: Iran Meteorological Organization (records), (temperatures), (precipitation), (humidity), (days with precipitation), (sunshine)
Source 2: Weather Atlas (UV),

Climate data for Tehran-Shomal (north of Tehran), altitude: 1549.1 m, from 1988–2010.
Month	Jan	Feb	Mar	Apr	May	Jun	Jul	Aug	Sep	Oct	Nov	Dec	Year
Record high °C (°F)	17.2 (63.0)	21.2 (70.2)	29.0 (84.2)	32.4 (90.3)	33.6 (92.5)	39.2 (102.6)	40.4 (104.7)	39.6 (103.3)	36.2 (97.2)	31.2 (88.2)	23.6 (74.5)	19.6 (67.3)	40.4 (104.7)
Mean daily maximum °C (°F)	6.1 (43.0)	8.6 (47.5)	13.8 (56.8)	20.0 (68.0)	25.5 (77.9)	31.6 (88.9)	34.4 (93.9)	33.6 (92.5)	29.5 (85.1)	22.8 (73.0)	14.5 (58.1)	8.6 (47.5)	20.8 (69.4)
Daily mean °C (°F)	2.3 (36.1)	4.4 (39.9)	9.2 (48.6)	14.9 (58.8)	19.8 (67.6)	25.6 (78.1)	28.5 (83.3)	27.6 (81.7)	23.4 (74.1)	17.2 (63.0)	9.9 (49.8)	4.8 (40.6)	15.6 (60.1)
Mean daily minimum °C (°F)	−1.5 (29.3)	0.2 (32.4)	4.6 (40.3)	9.8 (49.6)	14.2 (57.6)	19.7 (67.5)	22.6 (72.7)	21.6 (70.9)	17.3 (63.1)	11.7 (53.1)	5.3 (41.5)	0.9 (33.6)	10.5 (51.0)
Record low °C (°F)	−13.0 (8.6)	−11.0 (12.2)	−8.0 (17.6)	−1.6 (29.1)	3.0 (37.4)	12.0 (53.6)	15.4 (59.7)	13.5 (56.3)	8.8 (47.8)	2.6 (36.7)	−5.2 (22.6)	−9.6 (14.7)	−13.0 (8.6)
Average precipitation mm (inches)	61.9 (2.44)	68.3 (2.69)	73.9 (2.91)	53.2 (2.09)	24.0 (0.94)	4.9 (0.19)	3.8 (0.15)	2.5 (0.10)	3.8 (0.15)	18.4 (0.72)	41.5 (1.63)	64.3 (2.53)	420.5 (16.54)
Average precipitation days	12.3	10.9	12.3	10.0	8.9	3.3	3.4	1.6	1.3	5.8	8.6	10.7	89.1
Average snowy days	8.9	6.6	2.5	0.1	0.1	0	0	0	0	0	0.6	4.9	23.7
Average relative humidity (%)	67	59	53	44	39	30	31	31	33	44	57	66	46
Mean monthly sunshine hours	135.8	146.4	185.1	215.0	274.6	322.8	331.8	327.5	292.6	245.5	171.5	135.8	2,784.4

Climate data for Mashhad (1951–2010, extremes 1951–2010)
Month	Jan	Feb	Mar	Apr	May	Jun	Jul	Aug	Sep	Oct	Nov	Dec	Year
Record high °C (°F)	20.0 (68.0)	22.0 (71.6)	28.0 (82.4)	30.4 (86.7)	35.2 (95.4)	38.6 (101.5)	43.8 (110.8)	40.4 (104.7)	38.0 (100.4)	33.8 (92.8)	28.4 (83.1)	22.2 (72.0)	43.8 (110.8)
Mean daily maximum °C (°F)	6.1 (43.0)	7.3 (45.1)	12.2 (54.0)	17.9 (64.2)	24.8 (76.6)	30.3 (86.5)	32.4 (90.3)	31.1 (88.0)	25.9 (78.6)	20.5 (68.9)	13.5 (56.3)	8.1 (46.6)	21.2 (70.2)
Daily mean °C (°F)	1.7 (35.1)	3.7 (38.7)	8.5 (47.3)	14.7 (58.5)	19.6 (67.3)	24.4 (75.9)	26.6 (79.9)	24.8 (76.6)	20.3 (68.5)	14.5 (58.1)	8.7 (47.7)	4.0 (39.2)	14.3 (57.7)
Mean daily minimum °C (°F)	−5.8 (21.6)	−4.3 (24.3)	2.9 (37.2)	6.4 (43.5)	10.4 (50.7)	14.4 (57.9)	16.7 (62.1)	14.5 (58.1)	9.7 (49.5)	4.4 (39.9)	−1.9 (28.6)	−3.7 (25.3)	7.3 (45.1)
Record low °C (°F)	−27.0 (−16.6)	−32.0 (−25.6)	−13.0 (8.6)	−7.0 (19.4)	−1.0 (30.2)	4.0 (39.2)	10.0 (50.0)	5.0 (41.0)	−1.0 (30.2)	−8.0 (17.6)	−16.0 (3.2)	−25.0 (−13.0)	−32.0 (−25.6)
Average precipitation mm (inches)	32.6 (1.28)	34.5 (1.36)	55.5 (2.19)	45.4 (1.79)	27.2 (1.07)	4.0 (0.16)	1.1 (0.04)	0.7 (0.03)	2.1 (0.08)	8.0 (0.31)	16.1 (0.63)	24.3 (0.96)	251.5 (9.90)
Average precipitation days (≥ 1.0 mm)	5.6	5.8	8.2	6.8	4.5	1.1	0.3	0.2	0.5	1.5	2.9	4.2	41.6
Average snowy days	5.6	5.8	4.0	0.4	0.0	0.0	0.0	0.0	0.0	0.1	1.2	3.8	20.9
Average relative humidity (%)	75	73	69	62	50	37	34	33	37	49	63	73	54
Mean monthly sunshine hours	148.3	147.5	163.3	200.4	280.4	343.2	366.9	359.7	305.2	249.5	188.3	151.6	2,904.3
Source: Iran Meteorological Organization (records), (temperatures), (precipitation), (humidity), (days with precipitation), (sunshine)

Climate data for Isfahan (1961–1990, extremes 1951–2010)
Month	Jan	Feb	Mar	Apr	May	Jun	Jul	Aug	Sep	Oct	Nov	Dec	Year
Record high °C (°F)	20.4 (68.7)	23.4 (74.1)	29.0 (84.2)	32.0 (89.6)	37.6 (99.7)	41.0 (105.8)	43.0 (109.4)	42.0 (107.6)	39.0 (102.2)	33.2 (91.8)	26.8 (80.2)	21.2 (70.2)	43.0 (109.4)
Mean daily maximum °C (°F)	8.8 (47.8)	11.9 (53.4)	16.8 (62.2)	22.0 (71.6)	28.0 (82.4)	34.1 (93.4)	36.4 (97.5)	35.1 (95.2)	31.2 (88.2)	24.4 (75.9)	16.9 (62.4)	10.8 (51.4)	23.0 (73.4)
Daily mean °C (°F)	2.7 (36.9)	5.5 (41.9)	10.4 (50.7)	15.7 (60.3)	21.3 (70.3)	27.1 (80.8)	29.4 (84.9)	27.9 (82.2)	23.5 (74.3)	16.9 (62.4)	9.9 (49.8)	4.4 (39.9)	16.2 (61.2)
Mean daily minimum °C (°F)	−2.4 (27.7)	−0.2 (31.6)	4.5 (40.1)	9.4 (48.9)	14.2 (57.6)	19.1 (66.4)	21.5 (70.7)	19.8 (67.6)	15.1 (59.2)	9.3 (48.7)	3.6 (38.5)	−0.9 (30.4)	9.4 (48.9)
Record low °C (°F)	−19.4 (−2.9)	−12.2 (10.0)	−8.0 (17.6)	−4.0 (24.8)	4.5 (40.1)	10.0 (50.0)	13.0 (55.4)	11.0 (51.8)	5.0 (41.0)	0.0 (32.0)	−8.0 (17.6)	−13.0 (8.6)	−19.4 (−2.9)
Average precipitation mm (inches)	17.1 (0.67)	14.1 (0.56)	18.2 (0.72)	19.2 (0.76)	8.8 (0.35)	0.6 (0.02)	0.7 (0.03)	0.2 (0.01)	0.0 (0.0)	4.1 (0.16)	9.9 (0.39)	19.6 (0.77)	112.5 (4.43)
Average precipitation days (≥ 1.0 mm)	4.0	2.9	3.8	3.5	2.0	0.2	0.3	0.1	0.0	0.8	2.2	3.7	23.5
Average snowy days	3.2	1.7	0.7	0.1	0.0	0.0	0.0	0.0	0.0	0.0	0.2	1.9	7.8
Average relative humidity (%)	60	51	43	39	33	23	23	24	26	36	48	57	39
Mean monthly sunshine hours	205.3	213.3	242.1	244.5	301.3	345.4	347.6	331.2	311.6	276.5	226.1	207.6	3,252.5
Source 1: NOAA
Source 2: Iran Meteorological Organization (records)

Climate data for Karaj (1985–2010)
Month	Jan	Feb	Mar	Apr	May	Jun	Jul	Aug	Sep	Oct	Nov	Dec	Year
Record high °C (°F)	18.2 (64.8)	19.8 (67.6)	27.4 (81.3)	33.0 (91.4)	34.6 (94.3)	39.2 (102.6)	42.0 (107.6)	40.2 (104.4)	37.2 (99.0)	31.8 (89.2)	25.0 (77.0)	20.0 (68.0)	42.0 (107.6)
Mean daily maximum °C (°F)	6.1 (43.0)	9.0 (48.2)	14.2 (57.6)	20.7 (69.3)	26.2 (79.2)	32.6 (90.7)	35.2 (95.4)	34.5 (94.1)	30.4 (86.7)	23.5 (74.3)	15.1 (59.2)	8.9 (48.0)	21.4 (70.5)
Daily mean °C (°F)	1.8 (35.2)	4.1 (39.4)	8.7 (47.7)	14.5 (58.1)	19.2 (66.6)	24.6 (76.3)	27.1 (80.8)	26.8 (80.2)	22.9 (73.2)	17.1 (62.8)	9.9 (49.8)	4.6 (40.3)	15.1 (59.2)
Mean daily minimum °C (°F)	−2.5 (27.5)	−0.7 (30.7)	3.2 (37.8)	8.4 (47.1)	12.2 (54.0)	16.5 (61.7)	19.0 (66.2)	19.1 (66.4)	15.3 (59.5)	10.8 (51.4)	4.8 (40.6)	0.3 (32.5)	8.9 (48.0)
Record low °C (°F)	−19.0 (−2.2)	−15.6 (3.9)	−10.5 (13.1)	−3.5 (25.7)	−0.4 (31.3)	7.2 (45.0)	10.6 (51.1)	12.0 (53.6)	7.0 (44.6)	−0.5 (31.1)	−6.0 (21.2)	−14.6 (5.7)	−19.0 (−2.2)
Average precipitation mm (inches)	30.8 (1.21)	32.1 (1.26)	45.4 (1.79)	39.1 (1.54)	19.5 (0.77)	2.7 (0.11)	3.0 (0.12)	1.2 (0.05)	1.6 (0.06)	15.1 (0.59)	27.7 (1.09)	33.5 (1.32)	251.7 (9.91)
Average precipitation days (≥ 1.0 mm)	6.3	5.7	6.7	5.8	3.7	1.0	0.7	0.3	0.3	3.2	4.8	5.8	44.3
Average snowy days	5.4	3.7	1.9	0.1	0.0	0.0	0.0	0.0	0.0	0.0	0.5	2.7	14.3
Average relative humidity (%)	67	60	53	48	43	34	35	34	36	44	56	66	48
Mean monthly sunshine hours	166.3	169.7	197.4	218.1	280.7	335.2	341.5	340.1	304.2	250.1	187.2	156.8	2,947.3
Source: Iran Meteorological Organization (records), (temperatures), (precipitation), (humidity), (days with precipitation and snow), (sunshine)

Climate data for Shiraz (1961–1990, extremes 1951–2010)
Month	Jan	Feb	Mar	Apr	May	Jun	Jul	Aug	Sep	Oct	Nov	Dec	Year
Record high °C (°F)	22.4 (72.3)	24.0 (75.2)	30.6 (87.1)	34.0 (93.2)	38.6 (101.5)	42.0 (107.6)	43.2 (109.8)	42.0 (107.6)	39.0 (102.2)	34.4 (93.9)	28.4 (83.1)	23.2 (73.8)	43.2 (109.8)
Mean daily maximum °C (°F)	12.1 (53.8)	14.7 (58.5)	18.9 (66.0)	23.8 (74.8)	30.6 (87.1)	36.1 (97.0)	37.8 (100.0)	37.0 (98.6)	33.7 (92.7)	27.8 (82.0)	20.5 (68.9)	14.4 (57.9)	25.6 (78.1)
Daily mean °C (°F)	5.3 (41.5)	7.7 (45.9)	11.8 (53.2)	16.2 (61.2)	22.5 (72.5)	27.7 (81.9)	29.8 (85.6)	28.7 (83.7)	24.5 (76.1)	18.4 (65.1)	11.7 (53.1)	6.8 (44.2)	17.6 (63.7)
Mean daily minimum °C (°F)	−0.4 (31.3)	1.2 (34.2)	4.8 (40.6)	8.5 (47.3)	13.2 (55.8)	17.1 (62.8)	19.9 (67.8)	18.8 (65.8)	14.1 (57.4)	8.8 (47.8)	3.8 (38.8)	0.5 (32.9)	9.2 (48.6)
Record low °C (°F)	−14.0 (6.8)	−8.0 (17.6)	−4.0 (24.8)	−2.0 (28.4)	3.0 (37.4)	9.0 (48.2)	14.0 (57.2)	12.0 (53.6)	1.0 (33.8)	1.6 (34.9)	−8.0 (17.6)	−11.0 (12.2)	−14.0 (6.8)
Average precipitation mm (inches)	79.8 (3.14)	49.8 (1.96)	48.4 (1.91)	30.6 (1.20)	6.6 (0.26)	0.2 (0.01)	1.0 (0.04)	0.1 (0.00)	0.0 (0.0)	5.2 (0.20)	20.7 (0.81)	63.2 (2.49)	305.6 (12.03)
Average rainy days	8.7	7.9	7.9	6.4	2.1	0.2	0.8	0.4	0.1	1.2	3.7	7.2	46.6
Average snowy days	1.5	0.6	0.0	0.0	0.0	0.0	0.0	0.0	0.0	0.0	0.0	0.6	2.7
Average relative humidity (%)	65	58	51	46	32	22	24	24	26	34	48	61	41
Mean monthly sunshine hours	217.0	218.5	236.2	247.7	324.1	357.8	344.6	329.7	318.0	297.7	238.3	216.2	3,345.8
Source 1: NOAA
Source 2: Iran Meteorological Organization (records)

Climate data for Tabriz (1951–2010, extremes 1951–2010)
Month	Jan	Feb	Mar	Apr	May	Jun	Jul	Aug	Sep	Oct	Nov	Dec	Year
Record high °C (°F)	16.0 (60.8)	19.0 (66.2)	25.6 (78.1)	31.2 (88.2)	33.8 (92.8)	39.0 (102.2)	42.0 (107.6)	41.0 (105.8)	38.0 (100.4)	30.6 (87.1)	23.4 (74.1)	21.8 (71.2)	42.0 (107.6)
Mean daily maximum °C (°F)	2.3 (36.1)	4.9 (40.8)	10.6 (51.1)	17.0 (62.6)	22.8 (73.0)	28.8 (83.8)	32.8 (91.0)	32.7 (90.9)	28.3 (82.9)	20.7 (69.3)	12.0 (53.6)	5.2 (41.4)	18.2 (64.8)
Daily mean °C (°F)	−1.7 (28.9)	0.5 (32.9)	5.6 (42.1)	11.5 (52.7)	16.7 (62.1)	22.1 (71.8)	26.0 (78.8)	25.9 (78.6)	21.4 (70.5)	14.5 (58.1)	7.1 (44.8)	1.2 (34.2)	12.6 (54.7)
Mean daily minimum °C (°F)	−5.7 (21.7)	−3.9 (25.0)	0.6 (33.1)	6.0 (42.8)	10.7 (51.3)	15.4 (59.7)	19.3 (66.7)	19.1 (66.4)	14.5 (58.1)	8.4 (47.1)	2.1 (35.8)	−2.9 (26.8)	7.0 (44.6)
Record low °C (°F)	−30.0 (−22.0)	−25.0 (−13.0)	−20.0 (−4.0)	−15.0 (5.0)	0.6 (33.1)	4.0 (39.2)	7.0 (44.6)	10.0 (50.0)	4.0 (39.2)	−4.0 (24.8)	−17.0 (1.4)	−23.5 (−10.3)	−30.0 (−22.0)
Average precipitation mm (inches)	24.0 (0.94)	28.2 (1.11)	45.0 (1.77)	56.6 (2.23)	43.1 (1.70)	19.4 (0.76)	5.6 (0.22)	3.3 (0.13)	10.9 (0.43)	24.5 (0.96)	30.1 (1.19)	24.1 (0.95)	318.8 (12.55)
Average rainy days	6.9	7.3	10.7	14.8	9.3	3.2	1.2	0.6	1.9	4.9	5.5	6.3	72.6
Average snowy days	11.3	9.9	5.9	1.0	0.0	0.0	0.0	0.0	0.0	0.2	1.8	8.2	38.4
Average relative humidity (%)	72	69	61	56	50	40	36	36	39	51	65	71	53
Mean monthly sunshine hours	125.9	146.3	179.7	200.8	268.7	334.3	352.5	337.7	301.4	231.6	180.3	136.8	2,796
Source: Iran Meteorological Organization (records), (temperatures), (precipitation), (humidity), (days with precipitation), (sunshine)

Climate data for Qom (1986–2010)
Month	Jan	Feb	Mar	Apr	May	Jun	Jul	Aug	Sep	Oct	Nov	Dec	Year
Record high °C (°F)	23.4 (74.1)	26.5 (79.7)	35.5 (95.9)	36.5 (97.7)	41.5 (106.7)	44.2 (111.6)	47.0 (116.6)	45.5 (113.9)	41.6 (106.9)	36.6 (97.9)	28.6 (83.5)	22.5 (72.5)	47.0 (116.6)
Mean daily maximum °C (°F)	10.2 (50.4)	13.6 (56.5)	19.1 (66.4)	26.0 (78.8)	31.8 (89.2)	37.9 (100.2)	40.3 (104.5)	39.4 (102.9)	34.9 (94.8)	27.7 (81.9)	18.9 (66.0)	12.2 (54.0)	26.0 (78.8)
Daily mean °C (°F)	4.2 (39.6)	7.1 (44.8)	12.0 (53.6)	18.3 (64.9)	23.6 (74.5)	29.1 (84.4)	31.8 (89.2)	30.3 (86.5)	25.2 (77.4)	19.0 (66.2)	11.5 (52.7)	6.1 (43.0)	18.2 (64.8)
Mean daily minimum °C (°F)	−1.9 (28.6)	0.6 (33.1)	5.0 (41.0)	10.5 (50.9)	15.4 (59.7)	20.2 (68.4)	23.4 (74.1)	21.2 (70.2)	15.6 (60.1)	10.3 (50.5)	4.1 (39.4)	−0.1 (31.8)	10.4 (50.7)
Record low °C (°F)	−23 (−9)	−11.2 (11.8)	−11 (12)	0.4 (32.7)	5.4 (41.7)	8.0 (46.4)	15.0 (59.0)	13.5 (56.3)	6.5 (43.7)	0.6 (33.1)	−7 (19)	−10.5 (13.1)	−23 (−9)
Average precipitation mm (inches)	25.4 (1.00)	20.5 (0.81)	27.7 (1.09)	20.2 (0.80)	10.4 (0.41)	2.3 (0.09)	0.7 (0.03)	0.3 (0.01)	0.8 (0.03)	6.2 (0.24)	14.3 (0.56)	19.4 (0.76)	148.2 (5.83)
Average precipitation days (≥ 1.0 mm)	4.4	4.1	4.2	3.9	2.0	0.4	0.2	0.1	0.3	1.8	2.6	3.2	27.2
Average snowy days	3.1	1.4	0.3	0.0	0.0	0.0	0.0	0.0	0.0	0.0	0.1	0.9	5.8
Average relative humidity (%)	66	58	48	42	33	24	23	24	26	38	52	66	41
Mean monthly sunshine hours	185.0	194.0	221.5	233.3	296.6	351.5	354.5	347.3	309.9	263.4	204.9	172.7	3,134.6
Source: Iran Meteorological Organization (records), (temperatures), (precipitation), (humidity), (days with precipitation and snow), (sunshine)

Climate data for Ahvaz (1951–2010)
Month	Jan	Feb	Mar	Apr	May	Jun	Jul	Aug	Sep	Oct	Nov	Dec	Year
Record high °C (°F)	28.0 (82.4)	31.5 (88.7)	37.6 (99.7)	43.0 (109.4)	48.6 (119.5)	52.2 (126.0)	51.6 (124.9)	51.0 (123.8)	48.4 (119.1)	45.0 (113.0)	36.0 (96.8)	29.0 (84.2)	54.0 (129.2)
Mean daily maximum °C (°F)	17.5 (63.5)	20.5 (68.9)	25.5 (77.9)	32.2 (90.0)	39.3 (102.7)	44.6 (112.3)	46.3 (115.3)	45.9 (114.6)	42.5 (108.5)	36.0 (96.8)	26.5 (79.7)	19.4 (66.9)	33.0 (91.4)
Daily mean °C (°F)	12.3 (54.1)	14.7 (58.5)	19.0 (66.2)	24.9 (76.8)	31.1 (88.0)	35.2 (95.4)	37.3 (99.1)	36.7 (98.1)	33.0 (91.4)	27.3 (81.1)	19.8 (67.6)	14.0 (57.2)	25.4 (77.7)
Mean daily minimum °C (°F)	7.2 (45.0)	8.8 (47.8)	12.5 (54.5)	17.6 (63.7)	23.0 (73.4)	25.9 (78.6)	28.2 (82.8)	27.4 (81.3)	23.4 (74.1)	18.8 (65.8)	13.0 (55.4)	8.6 (47.5)	17.9 (64.2)
Record low °C (°F)	−7.0 (19.4)	−5.0 (23.0)	−1.0 (30.2)	6.0 (42.8)	13.0 (55.4)	15.0 (59.0)	19.0 (66.2)	18.0 (64.4)	13.0 (55.4)	8.0 (46.4)	0.0 (32.0)	−1.0 (30.2)	−7.0 (19.4)
Average precipitation mm (inches)	48.2 (1.90)	26.9 (1.06)	26.4 (1.04)	16.1 (0.63)	4.4 (0.17)	0.4 (0.02)	0.1 (0.00)	0.0 (0.0)	0.2 (0.01)	6.4 (0.25)	31.4 (1.24)	48.7 (1.92)	209.2 (8.24)
Average precipitation days (≥ 1.0 mm)	4.9	3.6	3.6	2.8	0.8	0.1	0.0	0.0	0.0	1.0	2.9	4.5	24.2
Average relative humidity (%)	71	61	51	41	28	22	24	28	29	38	53	69	43
Mean monthly sunshine hours	174.7	193.2	214.1	233.8	284.4	326.2	336.1	331.2	301.8	263.5	209.5	176.4	3,044.9
Source: Iran Meteorological Organization (records), (temperatures), "Average Maximum temperature in Ahwaz by Month 1951–2010". Iran Meteorological Organization. Archived from the original on 26 May 2016.; "Average Mean Daily temperature in Ahwaz by Month 1951–2010". Iran Meteorological Organization. Archived from the original on 17 April 2015.; "Average Minimum temperature in Ahwaz by Month 1951–2010". Iran Meteorological Organization. Archived from the original on 30 May 2016. (precipitation), (humidity), (days with precipitation), (sunshine)

Climate data for Kermanshah, Iran (1961–1990, extremes 1951–2010)
Month	Jan	Feb	Mar	Apr	May	Jun	Jul	Aug	Sep	Oct	Nov	Dec	Year
Record high °C (°F)	20.2 (68.4)	21.8 (71.2)	28.4 (83.1)	33.7 (92.7)	38.5 (101.3)	43.0 (109.4)	44.1 (111.4)	44.0 (111.2)	40.4 (104.7)	34.4 (93.9)	28.4 (83.1)	25.4 (77.7)	44.1 (111.4)
Mean daily maximum °C (°F)	6.5 (43.7)	8.9 (48.0)	14.3 (57.7)	19.7 (67.5)	25.8 (78.4)	33.3 (91.9)	37.8 (100.0)	37.0 (98.6)	32.5 (90.5)	25.0 (77.0)	16.7 (62.1)	9.7 (49.5)	22.3 (72.1)
Daily mean °C (°F)	0.6 (33.1)	2.5 (36.5)	7.7 (45.9)	12.7 (54.9)	17.6 (63.7)	23.6 (74.5)	28.2 (82.8)	27.2 (81.0)	22.4 (72.3)	16.0 (60.8)	8.9 (48.0)	3.5 (38.3)	14.2 (57.6)
Mean daily minimum °C (°F)	−4.3 (24.3)	−3.0 (26.6)	1.2 (34.2)	5.1 (41.2)	8.2 (46.8)	11.4 (52.5)	16.1 (61.0)	15.4 (59.7)	10.6 (51.1)	6.4 (43.5)	1.8 (35.2)	−1.7 (28.9)	5.6 (42.1)
Record low °C (°F)	−24 (−11)	−27.0 (−16.6)	−11.3 (11.7)	−6.1 (21.0)	−1.0 (30.2)	2.0 (35.6)	8.0 (46.4)	8.0 (46.4)	1.2 (34.2)	−3.5 (25.7)	−17.0 (1.4)	−17 (1)	−27.0 (−16.6)
Average precipitation mm (inches)	67.1 (2.64)	62.9 (2.48)	88.9 (3.50)	69.9 (2.75)	33.7 (1.33)	0.5 (0.02)	0.3 (0.01)	0.3 (0.01)	1.3 (0.05)	29.2 (1.15)	54.3 (2.14)	70.3 (2.77)	478.7 (18.85)
Average rainy days	11.4	10.7	12.6	11.0	7.6	0.5	0.2	0.4	0.5	4.9	7.9	9.6	77.3
Average snowy days	5.9	4.7	1.9	0.2	0.0	0.0	0.0	0.0	0.0	0.0	0.3	3.1	16.1
Average relative humidity (%)	75	71	62	57	49	28	23	23	25	40	59	71	49
Mean monthly sunshine hours	134.8	150.1	180.7	204.6	268.0	348.3	349.1	336.7	304.6	242.8	187.6	147.9	2,855.2
Source 1: NOAA
Source 2: Iran Meteorological Organization (records)

Climate data for Rasht
Month	Jan	Feb	Mar	Apr	May	Jun	Jul	Aug	Sep	Oct	Nov	Dec	Year
Record high °C (°F)	30 (86)	31 (88)	38.0 (100.4)	37 (99)	37.6 (99.7)	37 (99)	37 (99)	37.2 (99.0)	40 (104)	37.4 (99.3)	36 (97)	32 (90)	40 (104)
Mean daily maximum °C (°F)	11.0 (51.8)	11.2 (52.2)	13.5 (56.3)	19.0 (66.2)	24.0 (75.2)	28.1 (82.6)	30.3 (86.5)	30.2 (86.4)	26.7 (80.1)	22.1 (71.8)	17.5 (63.5)	13.5 (56.3)	20.6 (69.1)
Daily mean °C (°F)	6.7 (44.1)	7.0 (44.6)	9.4 (48.9)	14.3 (57.7)	19.2 (66.6)	23.2 (73.8)	25.3 (77.5)	25.3 (77.5)	22.2 (72.0)	17.7 (63.9)	12.9 (55.2)	8.9 (48.0)	16.0 (60.8)
Mean daily minimum °C (°F)	2.4 (36.3)	2.7 (36.9)	5.3 (41.5)	9.6 (49.3)	14.4 (57.9)	18.2 (64.8)	20.4 (68.7)	20.3 (68.5)	17.6 (63.7)	13.3 (55.9)	8.3 (46.9)	4.4 (39.9)	11.4 (52.5)
Record low °C (°F)	−19 (−2)	−18 (0)	−6.4 (20.5)	−2 (28)	3.6 (38.5)	5 (41)	11 (52)	9 (48)	7 (45)	1 (34)	−4 (25)	−10 (14)	−19 (−2)
Average precipitation mm (inches)	132.4 (5.21)	116.0 (4.57)	112.5 (4.43)	64.8 (2.55)	51.5 (2.03)	43.0 (1.69)	42.3 (1.67)	68.4 (2.69)	152.5 (6.00)	211.5 (8.33)	186.8 (7.35)	155.8 (6.13)	1,337.5 (52.65)
Average precipitation days	13.4	12.9	15.4	12.3	10.9	7.3	6.3	8.6	12.0	13.8	12.8	13.0	138.7
Average snowy days	2.5	2.8	1.3	0.1	0.0	0.0	0.0	0.0	0.0	0.0	0.1	0.9	7.7
Average relative humidity (%)	84	85	84	80	78	74	74	77	82	86	85	85	81
Mean monthly sunshine hours	91.7	86.7	91.2	122.0	174.0	213.2	222.1	187.7	140.2	118.3	100.2	89.6	1,636.9
Source 1: World Climate
Source 2: Shahrekord Meteorology Database

Climate data for Saqqez, Iran
Month	Jan	Feb	Mar	Apr	May	Jun	Jul	Aug	Sep	Oct	Nov	Dec	Year
Record high °C (°F)	18.2 (64.8)	20 (68)	24 (75)	29 (84)	34.4 (93.9)	39 (102)	43 (109)	42 (108)	39 (102)	32 (90)	26 (79)	22.2 (72.0)	43 (109)
Mean daily maximum °C (°F)	2.4 (36.3)	4.7 (40.5)	11.0 (51.8)	17.3 (63.1)	23.1 (73.6)	29.8 (85.6)	34.3 (93.7)	34.2 (93.6)	29.8 (85.6)	22.2 (72.0)	13.4 (56.1)	6.1 (43.0)	19.03 (66.25)
Mean daily minimum °C (°F)	−8.1 (17.4)	−6.7 (19.9)	−1.2 (29.8)	3.6 (38.5)	6.6 (43.9)	9.5 (49.1)	14.0 (57.2)	13.4 (56.1)	8.3 (46.9)	4.4 (39.9)	−0.3 (31.5)	−4.6 (23.7)	3.24 (37.83)
Record low °C (°F)	−32 (−26)	−36 (−33)	−27.6 (−17.7)	−9 (16)	−5 (23)	−0.6 (30.9)	3.8 (38.8)	4.8 (40.6)	−0.4 (31.3)	−7 (19)	−24 (−11)	−32 (−26)	−36 (−33)
Average precipitation mm (inches)	66.6 (2.62)	58.7 (2.31)	79.5 (3.13)	83.6 (3.29)	52.0 (2.05)	5.8 (0.23)	2.9 (0.11)	2.5 (0.10)	1.4 (0.06)	27.8 (1.09)	56.9 (2.24)	61.7 (2.43)	499.4 (19.66)
Average precipitation days (≥ 1.0 mm)	8.5	8.3	10.0	9.8	7.0	1.2	0.7	0.6	0.5	4.3	6.2	8.1	65.2
Average relative humidity (%)	73	70	64	58	52	40	35	33	33	47	63	71	53
Mean monthly sunshine hours	121.5	142.2	177.4	213.1	287.1	345.1	357.4	344.3	311.1	254.3	174.1	123.4	2,851
Source: Synoptic Stations Statistics

Climate data for Hamedan
Month	Jan	Feb	Mar	Apr	May	Jun	Jul	Aug	Sep	Oct	Nov	Dec	Year
Record high °C (°F)	17.0 (62.6)	19.0 (66.2)	25.0 (77.0)	28.0 (82.4)	33.0 (91.4)	39.0 (102.2)	40.6 (105.1)	39.4 (102.9)	36.4 (97.5)	30.0 (86.0)	23.0 (73.4)	18.8 (65.8)	40.6 (105.1)
Mean daily maximum °C (°F)	2.0 (35.6)	4.3 (39.7)	11.5 (52.7)	18.1 (64.6)	23.9 (75.0)	30.9 (87.6)	34.9 (94.8)	34.2 (93.6)	29.8 (85.6)	21.9 (71.4)	13.7 (56.7)	5.9 (42.6)	19.3 (66.7)
Daily mean °C (°F)	−4.6 (23.7)	−2.2 (28.0)	4.5 (40.1)	10.4 (50.7)	15.5 (59.9)	21.3 (70.3)	25.3 (77.5)	24.3 (75.7)	19.0 (66.2)	12.1 (53.8)	5.3 (41.5)	−0.9 (30.4)	10.8 (51.5)
Mean daily minimum °C (°F)	−10.5 (13.1)	−8.2 (17.2)	−2.1 (28.2)	2.7 (36.9)	6.4 (43.5)	9.8 (49.6)	13.9 (57.0)	12.8 (55.0)	7.0 (44.6)	2.5 (36.5)	−2.1 (28.2)	−6.6 (20.1)	2.1 (35.8)
Record low °C (°F)	−34 (−29)	−33.0 (−27.4)	−21 (−6)	−12.0 (10.4)	−3.0 (26.6)	2.0 (35.6)	7.0 (44.6)	4.0 (39.2)	−4.0 (24.8)	−7.0 (19.4)	−14.5 (5.9)	−29 (−20)	−34 (−29)
Average precipitation mm (inches)	46.3 (1.82)	43.6 (1.72)	49.4 (1.94)	49.8 (1.96)	37.8 (1.49)	3.7 (0.15)	2.0 (0.08)	1.8 (0.07)	0.8 (0.03)	20.7 (0.81)	26.9 (1.06)	40.9 (1.61)	323.7 (12.74)
Average rainy days	11.6	11.1	12.4	12.1	9.5	2.0	1.3	1.6	1.0	5.6	6.8	10.1	85.1
Average snowy days	8.8	8.2	4.2	0.6	0	0	0	0	0	0.2	0.9	6.9	29.8
Average relative humidity (%)	76	73	64	56	50	36	31	31	34	48	61	73	53
Mean monthly sunshine hours	131.8	137.1	174.5	199.6	258.5	341.8	342.7	322.2	295.6	234.3	183.1	135.3	2,756.5
Source: NOAA (1961–1990)

Climate data for Yazd (1951–2010, records and temperature normals 1951–2020)
Month	Jan	Feb	Mar	Apr	May	Jun	Jul	Aug	Sep	Oct	Nov	Dec	Year
Record high °C (°F)	27.0 (80.6)	29.4 (84.9)	35.2 (95.4)	38.0 (100.4)	41.0 (105.8)	44.1 (111.4)	45.6 (114.1)	45.6 (114.1)	42.0 (107.6)	36.4 (97.5)	30.8 (87.4)	28.5 (83.3)	45.6 (114.1)
Mean daily maximum °C (°F)	12.7 (54.9)	16.0 (60.8)	21.0 (69.8)	26.9 (80.4)	32.5 (90.5)	38.1 (100.6)	39.6 (103.3)	38.0 (100.4)	34.5 (94.1)	27.8 (82.0)	19.9 (67.8)	14.5 (58.1)	26.8 (80.2)
Daily mean °C (°F)	6.4 (43.5)	9.3 (48.7)	14.2 (57.6)	19.9 (67.8)	25.3 (77.5)	30.5 (86.9)	32.3 (90.1)	30.2 (86.4)	26.3 (79.3)	19.9 (67.8)	12.7 (54.9)	7.8 (46.0)	19.6 (67.2)
Mean daily minimum °C (°F)	-0 (32)	2.6 (36.7)	7.4 (45.3)	12.9 (55.2)	18.0 (64.4)	22.8 (73.0)	24.9 (76.8)	22.3 (72.1)	18.1 (64.6)	12.0 (53.6)	5.5 (41.9)	1.1 (34.0)	12.3 (54.1)
Record low °C (°F)	−14 (7)	−10.1 (13.8)	−7 (19)	0.0 (32.0)	2.0 (35.6)	11.0 (51.8)	16.0 (60.8)	12.0 (53.6)	2.0 (35.6)	−3 (27)	−10 (14)	−16 (3)	−16 (3)
Average precipitation mm (inches)	12.2 (0.48)	7.6 (0.30)	12.5 (0.49)	7.3 (0.29)	3.6 (0.14)	0.3 (0.01)	0.2 (0.01)	0.1 (0.00)	0.1 (0.00)	1.2 (0.05)	4.1 (0.16)	10.0 (0.39)	59.2 (2.32)
Average precipitation days	4.8	3.5	4.8	4.3	2.2	0.3	0.2	0.1	0.1	0.8	2.2	3.7	27
Average snowy days	2.1	0.8	0.2	0.0	0.0	0.0	0.0	0.0	0.0	0.0	0.1	0.8	4
Average relative humidity (%)	54	44	37	32	25	18	17	17	19	27	38	50	32
Mean monthly sunshine hours	194.1	210.3	225.4	246.2	302.7	343.1	347.2	346.1	316.4	286.9	226.2	200.3	3,244.9
Source 1:
Source 2: IRIMO (extremes, sun, humidity, 1952–2010)

Climate data for Ardabil
Month	Jan	Feb	Mar	Apr	May	Jun	Jul	Aug	Sep	Oct	Nov	Dec	Year
Record high °C (°F)	18.2 (64.8)	20.0 (68.0)	27.2 (81.0)	32.0 (89.6)	33.0 (91.4)	37.5 (99.5)	38.0 (100.4)	39.8 (103.6)	37.4 (99.3)	30.8 (87.4)	25.0 (77.0)	21.2 (70.2)	39.8 (103.6)
Mean daily maximum °C (°F)	3.0 (37.4)	4.5 (40.1)	9.3 (48.7)	16.7 (62.1)	19.7 (67.5)	23.2 (73.8)	25.0 (77.0)	24.7 (76.5)	22.6 (72.7)	17.5 (63.5)	11.4 (52.5)	5.7 (42.3)	15.3 (59.5)
Mean daily minimum °C (°F)	−7.9 (17.8)	−6.3 (20.7)	−2.4 (27.7)	2.8 (37.0)	6.0 (42.8)	9.0 (48.2)	11.6 (52.9)	11.6 (52.9)	8.7 (47.7)	4.8 (40.6)	0.3 (32.5)	−4.6 (23.7)	2.8 (37.0)
Record low °C (°F)	−31.4 (−24.5)	−33.8 (−28.8)	−28.8 (−19.8)	−13.0 (8.6)	−8.5 (16.7)	−0.2 (31.6)	3.0 (37.4)	2.2 (36.0)	−4.4 (24.1)	−21.0 (−5.8)	−24.2 (−11.6)	−27.0 (−16.6)	−33.8 (−28.8)
Average precipitation mm (inches)	25.3 (1.00)	24.1 (0.95)	40.1 (1.58)	47.0 (1.85)	42.6 (1.68)	18.9 (0.74)	5.9 (0.23)	5.5 (0.22)	10.4 (0.41)	31.8 (1.25)	34.5 (1.36)	29.4 (1.16)	315.5 (12.43)
Average rainy days	8.2	8.9	11.3	14.2	15.7	7.2	3.9	4.1	6.4	9.2	7.7	7.9	104.7
Average snowy days	7.6	7.7	7.1	2.1	0.3	0.0	0.0	0.0	0.0	0.9	3.5	6.3	35.5
Average relative humidity (%)	75	74	73	68	71	71	69	70	74	75	74	74	72
Mean monthly sunshine hours	146.2	153.7	170.4	184.9	245.4	293.6	302.8	274.3	227.1	185.6	153.4	141.0	2,478.4

Climate data for Bandar Abbas (1961–1990)
Month	Jan	Feb	Mar	Apr	May	Jun	Jul	Aug	Sep	Oct	Nov	Dec	Year
Record high °C (°F)	32.0 (89.6)	33.0 (91.4)	39.0 (102.2)	42.0 (107.6)	47.0 (116.6)	51.0 (123.8)	48.0 (118.4)	46.0 (114.8)	45.0 (113.0)	42.0 (107.6)	38.0 (100.4)	32.0 (89.6)	51.0 (123.8)
Mean daily maximum °C (°F)	23.5 (74.3)	24.4 (75.9)	27.7 (81.9)	31.6 (88.9)	36.3 (97.3)	38.4 (101.1)	38.2 (100.8)	37.7 (99.9)	36.8 (98.2)	35.0 (95.0)	30.4 (86.7)	25.5 (77.9)	32.13 (89.83)
Daily mean °C (°F)	18.1 (64.6)	19.4 (66.9)	23.1 (73.6)	26.8 (80.2)	31.2 (88.2)	33.7 (92.7)	34.4 (93.9)	34.0 (93.2)	32.5 (90.5)	29.6 (85.3)	24.3 (75.7)	19.7 (67.5)	27.2 (81.0)
Mean daily minimum °C (°F)	12.1 (53.8)	14.0 (57.2)	17.5 (63.5)	20.9 (69.6)	24.7 (76.5)	28.0 (82.4)	30.3 (86.5)	30.1 (86.2)	27.7 (81.9)	23.5 (74.3)	18.0 (64.4)	13.5 (56.3)	21.69 (71.04)
Record low °C (°F)	2.3 (36.1)	5.4 (41.7)	7.6 (45.7)	11.5 (52.7)	17.0 (62.6)	20.0 (68.0)	25.2 (77.4)	25.0 (77.0)	21.0 (69.8)	12.0 (53.6)	6.0 (42.8)	2.0 (35.6)	2.0 (35.6)
Average precipitation mm (inches)	39.7 (1.56)	47.5 (1.87)	34.8 (1.37)	10.7 (0.42)	4.8 (0.19)	0.0 (0.0)	0.6 (0.02)	2.2 (0.09)	0.8 (0.03)	1.3 (0.05)	5.0 (0.20)	24.0 (0.94)	171.4 (6.74)
Average precipitation days (≥ 1.0 mm)	3.3	3.1	2.6	1.3	0.2	0.0	0.1	0.2	0.1	0.1	0.4	2.3	13.7
Average relative humidity (%)	64	68	67	64	61	64	68	69	67	64	61	63	65
Mean monthly sunshine hours	220.1	211.9	232.5	242.4	312.7	302.2	264.6	270.1	270.1	283.4	251.2	228.8	3,090
Source: NOAA (1961–1990)

Climate data for Arak
Month	Jan	Feb	Mar	Apr	May	Jun	Jul	Aug	Sep	Oct	Nov	Dec	Year
Record high °C (°F)	17.0 (62.6)	21.0 (69.8)	25.2 (77.4)	29.0 (84.2)	35.0 (95.0)	41.0 (105.8)	44.0 (111.2)	41.0 (105.8)	38.0 (100.4)	31.0 (87.8)	24.0 (75.2)	20.0 (68.0)	44.0 (111.2)
Mean daily maximum °C (°F)	4.2 (39.6)	7.3 (45.1)	13.7 (56.7)	19.7 (67.5)	25.6 (78.1)	32.5 (90.5)	35.7 (96.3)	34.9 (94.8)	30.7 (87.3)	23.2 (73.8)	14.5 (58.1)	7.7 (45.9)	20.8 (69.5)
Daily mean °C (°F)	−0.8 (30.6)	1.9 (35.4)	7.8 (46.0)	13.4 (56.1)	18.2 (64.8)	24.0 (75.2)	27.3 (81.1)	26.4 (79.5)	21.9 (71.4)	15.6 (60.1)	8.4 (47.1)	2.8 (37.0)	13.9 (57.0)
Mean daily minimum °C (°F)	−5.7 (21.7)	−3.4 (25.9)	2.0 (35.6)	7.0 (44.6)	10.9 (51.6)	15.5 (59.9)	19.0 (66.2)	17.9 (64.2)	13.1 (55.6)	7.9 (46.2)	2.4 (36.3)	−2.1 (28.2)	7.0 (44.7)
Record low °C (°F)	−29.6 (−21.3)	−30.5 (−22.9)	−22 (−8)	−7.0 (19.4)	0.0 (32.0)	4.0 (39.2)	12.0 (53.6)	10.0 (50.0)	2.0 (35.6)	−4.0 (24.8)	−17 (1)	−23 (−9)	−30.5 (−22.9)
Average precipitation mm (inches)	51.6 (2.03)	43.3 (1.70)	57.1 (2.25)	53.6 (2.11)	30.0 (1.18)	2.8 (0.11)	1.2 (0.05)	1.6 (0.06)	0.9 (0.04)	16.9 (0.67)	33.7 (1.33)	44.4 (1.75)	337.1 (13.28)
Average rainy days	10.8	9.8	11.4	9.4	7.1	1.1	0.9	0.6	0.6	4.3	6.1	8.9	71
Average snowy days	7.6	6.4	3.2	0.5	0	0	0	0	0	0.1	0.7	4.6	23.1
Average relative humidity (%)	72	66	54	48	41	29	28	27	28	41	57	68	47
Mean monthly sunshine hours	152.0	170.9	206.2	225.7	288.3	345.0	334.8	330.9	305.1	259.3	185.9	154.3	2,958.4
Source: NOAA (1961–1990)

== Flora and fauna ==
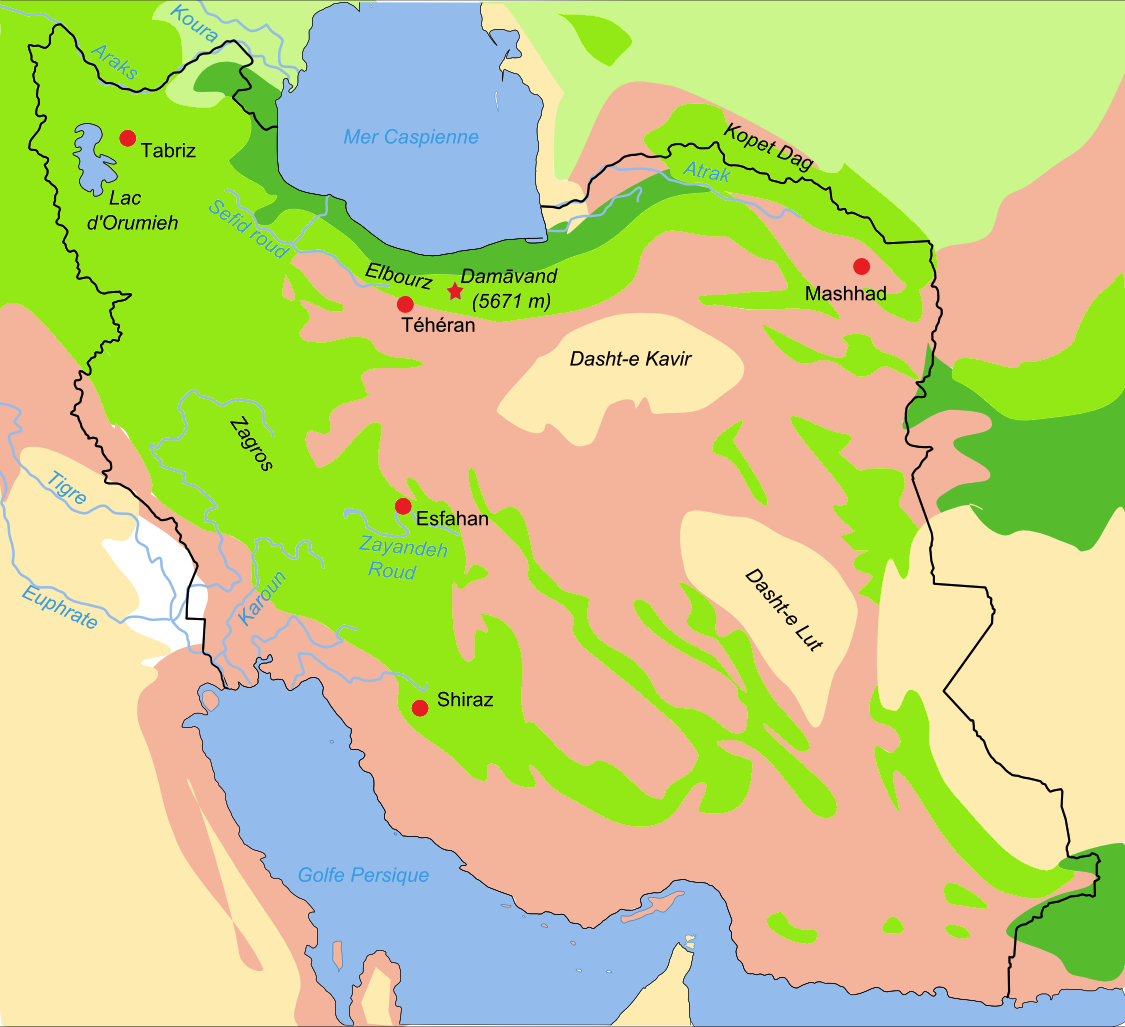
Map of biotopes of Iran Forest steppe Forests and woodlands Semi-desert Desert lowlands Steppe Salted alluvial marshes

7% of the country is forested. The most extensive growths are found on the mountain slopes rising from the Caspian Sea, with stands of oak, ash, elm, cypress, and other valuable trees. On the plateau proper, areas of scrub oak appear on the best-watered mountain slopes, and villagers cultivate orchards and grow the plane tree, poplar, willow, walnut, beech, maple, and mulberry. Wild plants and shrubs spring from the barren land in the spring and afford pasturage, but the summer sun burns them away. According to FAO reports, the major types of forests that exist in Iran and their respective areas are:

1. Caspian forests of the northern districts – 19,000 km^{2} (7,300 sq mi)
2. Limestone mountainous forests in the northeastern districts (Juniperus forests) – 13,000 km^{2} (5,000 sq mi)
3. Pistachio forests in the eastern, southern and southeastern districts – 26,000 km^{2} (10,000 sq mi)
4. Oak forests in the central and western districts – 35,000 km^{2} (14,000 sq mi)
5. Shrubs of the Kavir (desert) districts in the central and northeastern part of the country – 10,000 km^{2} (3,900 sq mi)
6. Sub-tropical forests of the southern coast, like the Hara forests – 5,000 km^{2} (1,900 sq mi)

Wildlife of Iran is diverse and composed of several animal species including bears, gazelles, wild pigs, wolves, jackals, panthers, Eurasian lynx, and foxes. Domestic animals include, sheep, goats, cattle, horses, water buffalo, donkeys, and camels. The pheasant, partridge, stork, eagles and falcon are also native to Iran.

As of 2001, 20 of Iran's mammal species and 14 bird species are endangered. Among them are the Baluchistan bear (Ursus thibetanus gedrosianus), a subspecies of Asian black bear, Persian fallow deer, Siberian crane, hawksbill turtle, green turtle, Oxus cobra, Latifi's viper, dugong and dolphins. The Asiatic cheetah is a critically endangered species which is extinct elsewhere and now can only be found in central to northeastern parts of Iran.

Iran lost all its Asiatic lions and Caspian tigers by the earlier part of the 20th century. The Syrian wild ass has become extinct. Syrian brown bears in the mountains, wild sheep and goats, gazelles, Persian onagers, wild pigs, Persian leopards, and foxes abound. Domestic animals include sheep, goats, cattle, horses, water buffalo, donkeys, and camels. The pheasant, partridge, stork, and falcon are native to Iran.

The Persian leopard is said to be the largest of all the subspecies of leopards in the world. The main range of this species in Iran closely overlaps with that of bezoar ibex. Hence, it is found throughout Alborz and Zagros mountain ranges, as well as smaller ranges within the Iranian plateau. The leopard population is very sparse, due to loss of habitat, loss of natural prey, and population fragmentation. Apart from bezoar ibex, wild sheep, boar, deer, (either Caspian red deer or roe deer), and domestic animals constitute leopards' diet in Iran.

=== Ecosystem and biosphere ===
Iran's bio-diversity ranks 13th in the world. There are 272 conservation areas around Iran for a total of 17 million hectares under the supervision of the Department of Environment (Iran), variously named national parks, protected areas, and natural wildlife refuges, all meant to protect the genetic resources of the country. There are only 2,617 rangers and 430 environmental monitoring units engaged in protecting these vast areas, which amounts to 6,500 hectares to cover for each ranger.

Ramsar sites (23 June 1975)	Area (km^{2})
Anzali Wetland Complex, Gilan province	150
Arjan Meadow, Fars province	22
Lake Gori, East Azerbaijan province	1.2
Lake Kobi, West Azerbaijan province	12
Lake Parishan, Fars province	40
Miankaleh Peninsula, Gorgan Bay, Lapoo-Zaghmarz Ab-bandan Mazandaran province	1000

== Environmental concerns ==
Natural hazards: periodic droughts, floods; dust storms, sandstorms; earthquakes along western border and in the northeast

Environment – current issues: air pollution, especially in urban areas, from vehicle emissions, refinery operations, and industrial effluents; deforestation; desertification; oil pollution in the Persian Gulf; wetland losses from drought; soil degradation (salination); inadequate supplies of potable water in some areas; water pollution from raw sewage and industrial waste; urbanization.

== Resources and land use ==
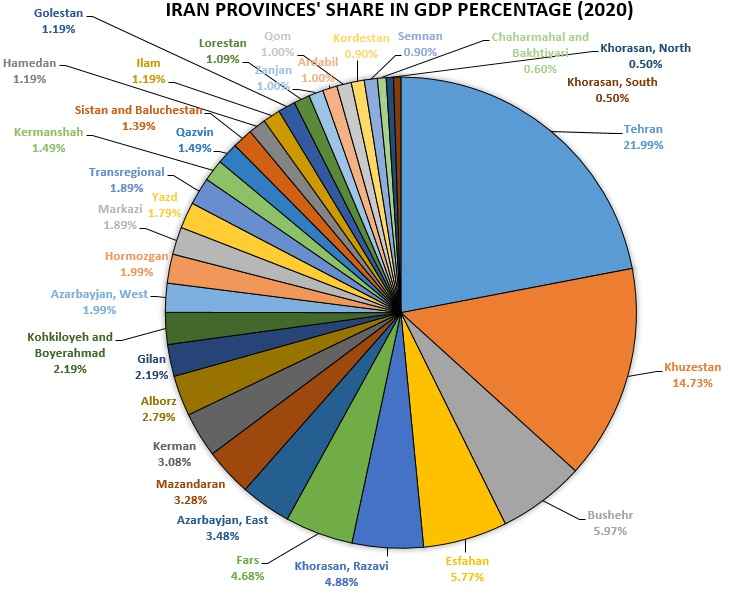
Iranian provinces' contribution to GDP. Tehran host 45% of Iran's industries.

Natural resources: petroleum, natural gas, coal, chromium, copper, iron ore, lead, manganese, zinc, sulfur
arable land: 10.87%
permanent crops: 1.19%
other: 87.93% (2012 est.)

Irrigated land: 87,000 km^{2} (34,000 sq mi) (2009)

Total renewable water resources: 137 km^{3} (2011)

Freshwater withdrawal (domestic/industrial/agricultural):
total: 93.3 km^{3}/yr (7%/1%/92%)
per capita: 1,306 m^{3}/yr (2004)

== Area and boundaries ==
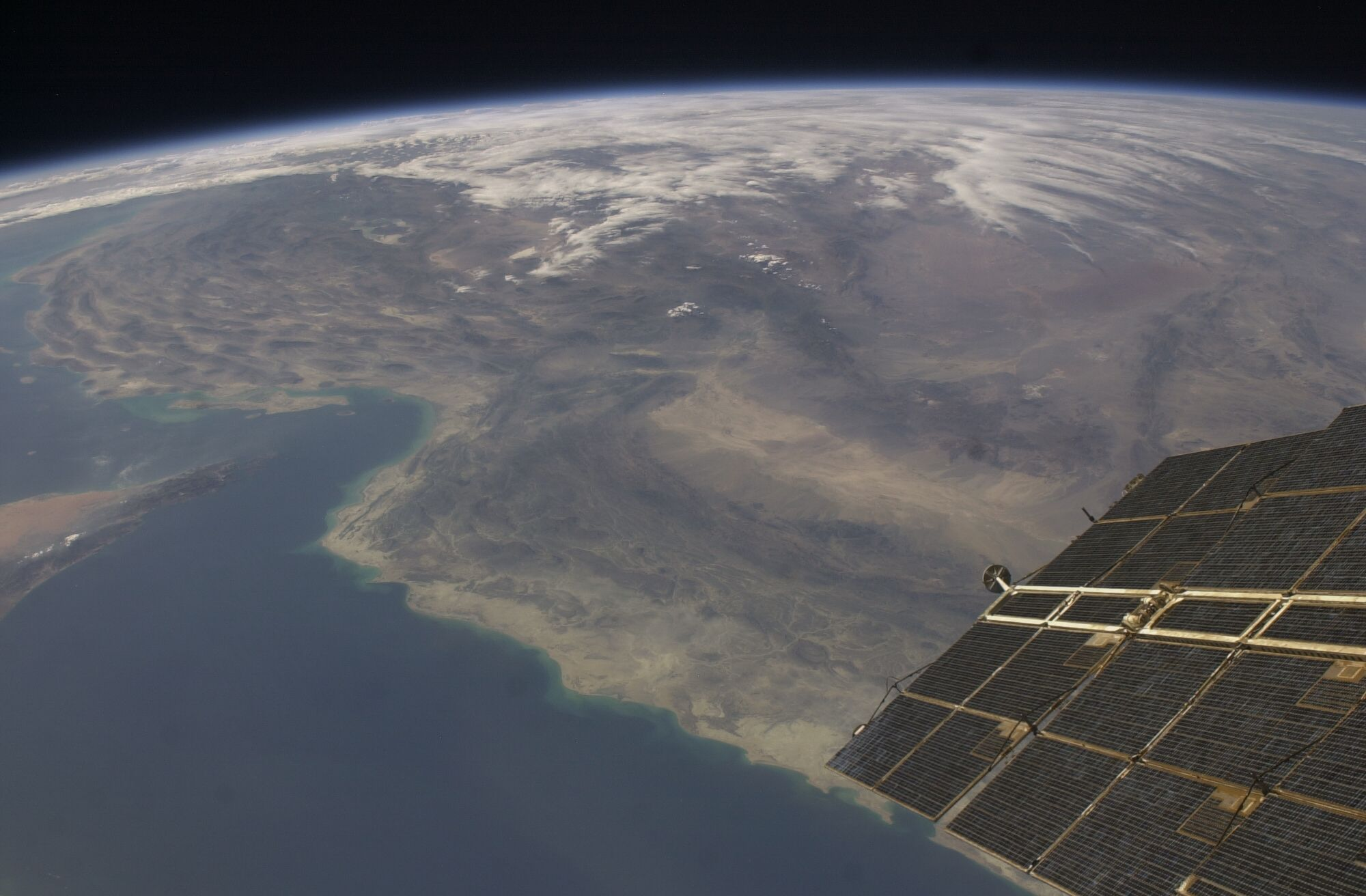
Satellite view of southern Pakistan, Iran and the Gulf of Oman

Map of Provinces, Capitals, and Counties of Iran

Area
- total: 1,648,195 km^{2} (636,372 sq mi)
  - country rank in the world: 17th
- land: 1,531,595 km^{2} (591,352 sq mi)
- water: 116,600 km^{2} (45,000 sq mi)

Area – comparative
- Australia comparative: slightly smaller than Queensland
- Canada comparative: slightly larger than Quebec
- United States comparative: slightly larger than Alaska
- EU comparative: slightly more than three times the size of Metropolitan France

Land boundaries
- total: 5,894 kilometres (3,662 mi)
- border countries:
  - Afghanistan 921 kilometres (572 mi)
  - Armenia 44 kilometres (27 mi)
  - Azerbaijan
    - Azerbaijan proper 432 kilometres (268 mi)
      - Nakhchivan exclave 179 kilometres (111 mi)
  - Iraq 1,599 kilometres (994 mi)
  - Pakistan 909 kilometres (565 mi)
  - Turkey 534 kilometres (332 mi)
  - Turkmenistan 1,148 kilometres (713 mi).

Maritime boundaries
- Qatar, Saudi Arabia, United Arab Emirates, Bahrain, Kuwait, Oman, Azerbaijan, Turkmenistan

Coastline
- 2,815 kilometres (1,749 mi)
  - note: Iran also borders the Caspian Sea, for 740 kilometres (460 mi)

Maritime claims
- territorial sea: 12 nmi (22.2 km; 13.8 mi)
- contiguous zone: 24 nmi (44.4 km; 27.6 mi)
- exclusive economic zone: 168,718 km^{2} (65,142 mi^{2}) with bilateral agreements, or median lines in the Persian Gulf
- continental shelf: natural prolongation

Elevation extremes
- lowest point: Caspian Sea −28 metres (−92 ft)
- highest point: Mount Damavand 5,610 metres (18,410 ft)

== International territorial disputes ==
Iran is currently engaged in international territorial disputes with several neighbouring countries.

The country protests Afghanistan's limiting flow of dammed tributaries to the Helmand River in periods of drought. The lack of a maritime boundary in the Persian Gulf with Iraq also prompts jurisdictional disputes beyond the mouth of the Arvand Rud. Iran and the United Arab Emirates have a territorial dispute over the Greater and Lesser Tunbs and Abu Musa islands, which are administered by Iran. Iran currently insists on dividing the Caspian Sea resources equally among the five littoral states, after the Russian-backed former soviet breakaway republics refused to respect the 50-50 agreements between Iran and the Soviet Union (despite their international obligation). Russia, Azerbaijan, Kazakhstan and Turkmenistan continue to claim territorial waters thus regarding the Caspian Sea as open international body of water, dismissing its geographically lake nature.

Photo gallery

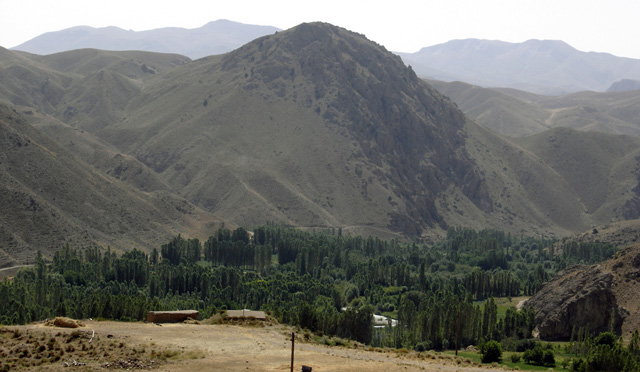
Southern Alborz range near Firouzkuh

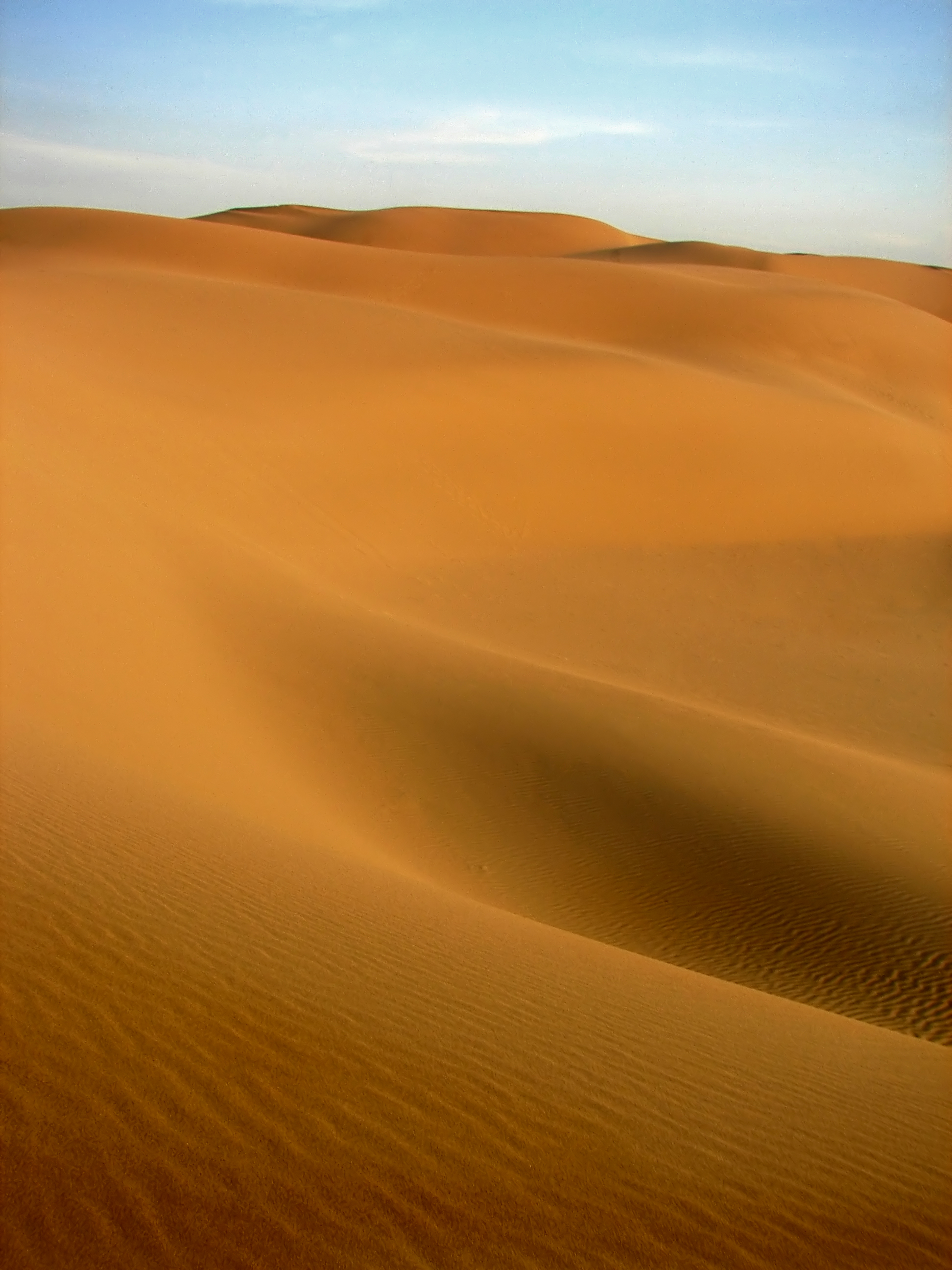
Maranjab dunes, Kavir desert, Kashan

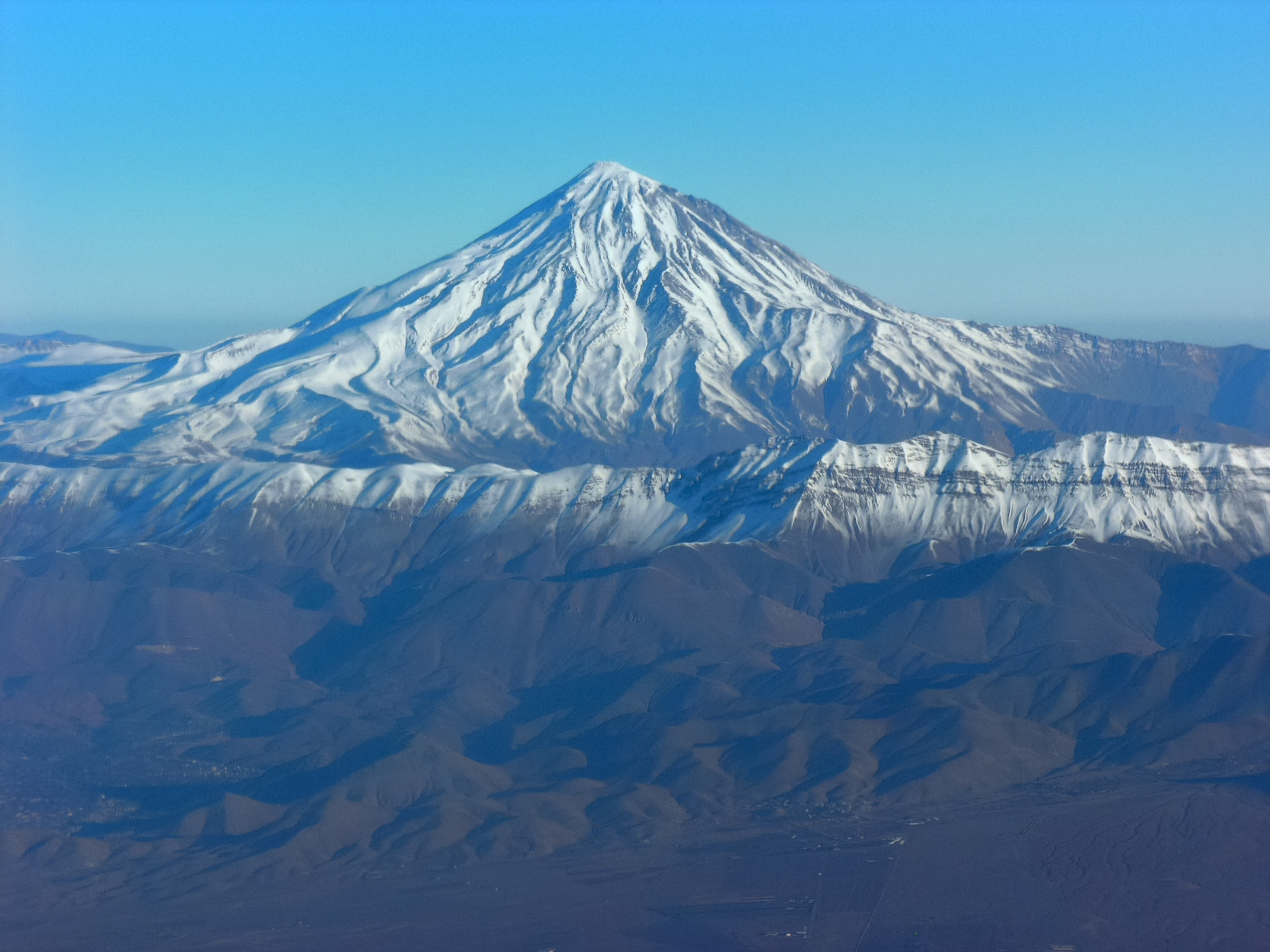
Aerial view of Mount Damavand, Mazandaran

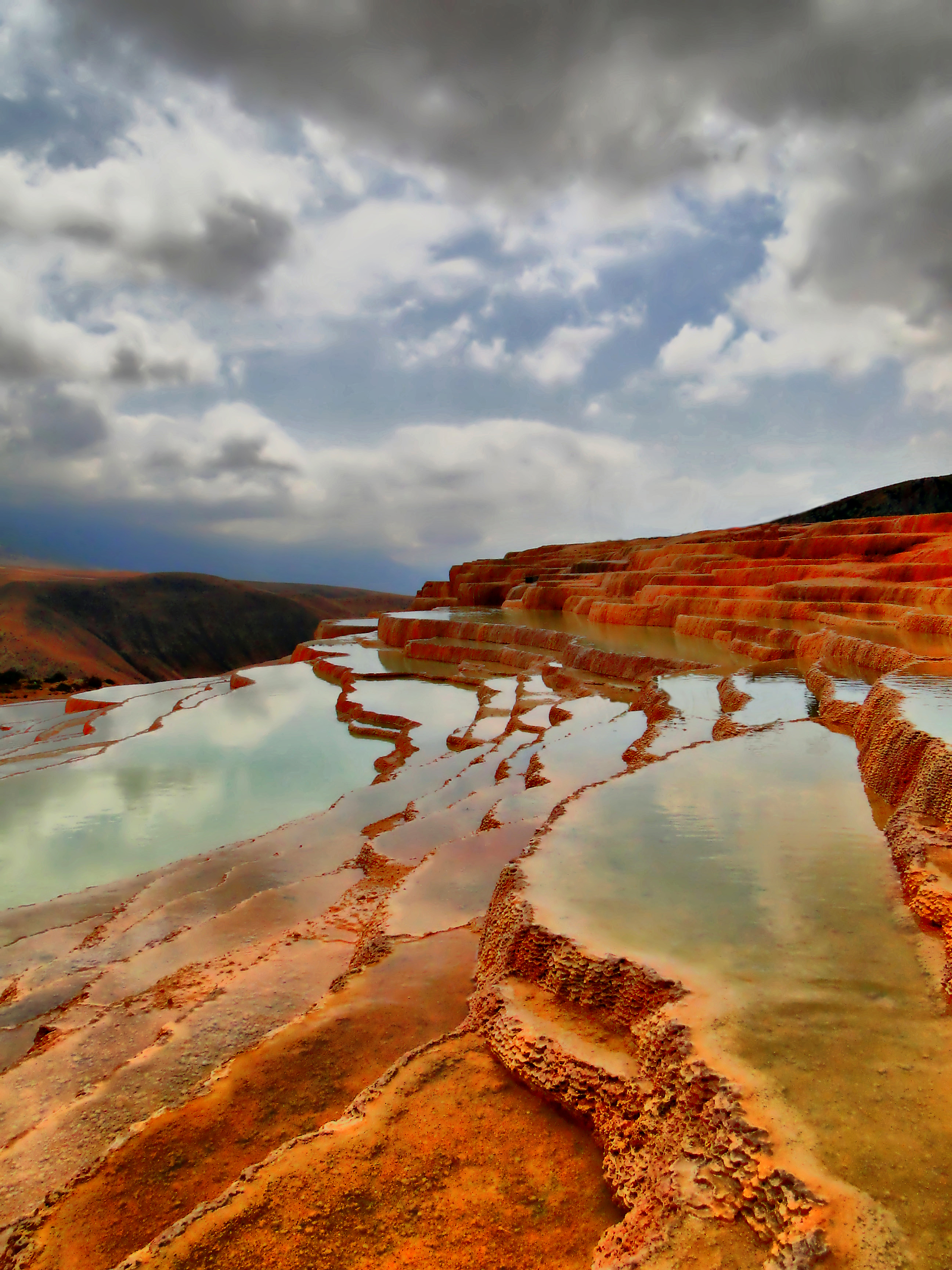
Badab-e Surt, Mazandaran

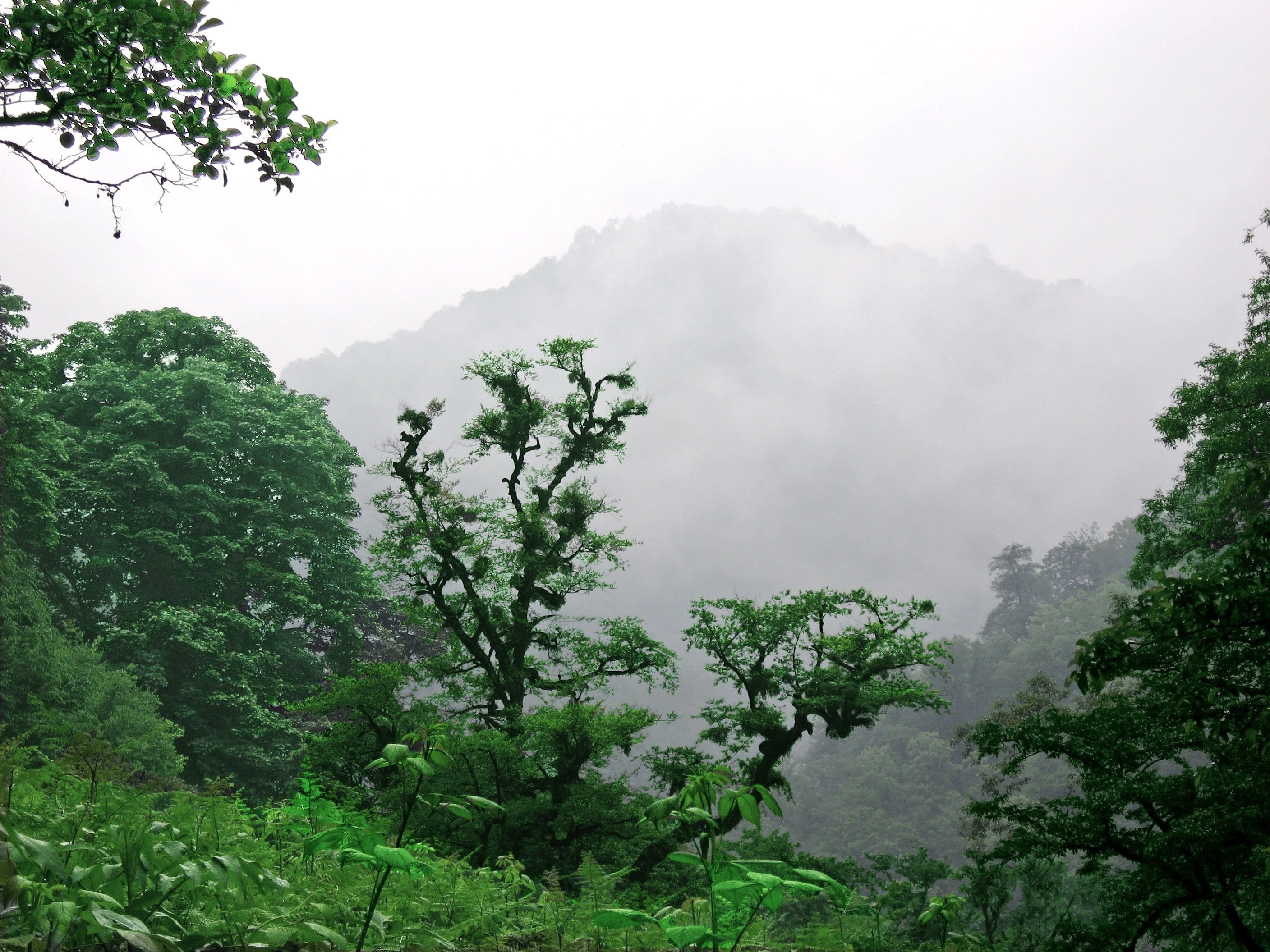
Rain forest in Gilan

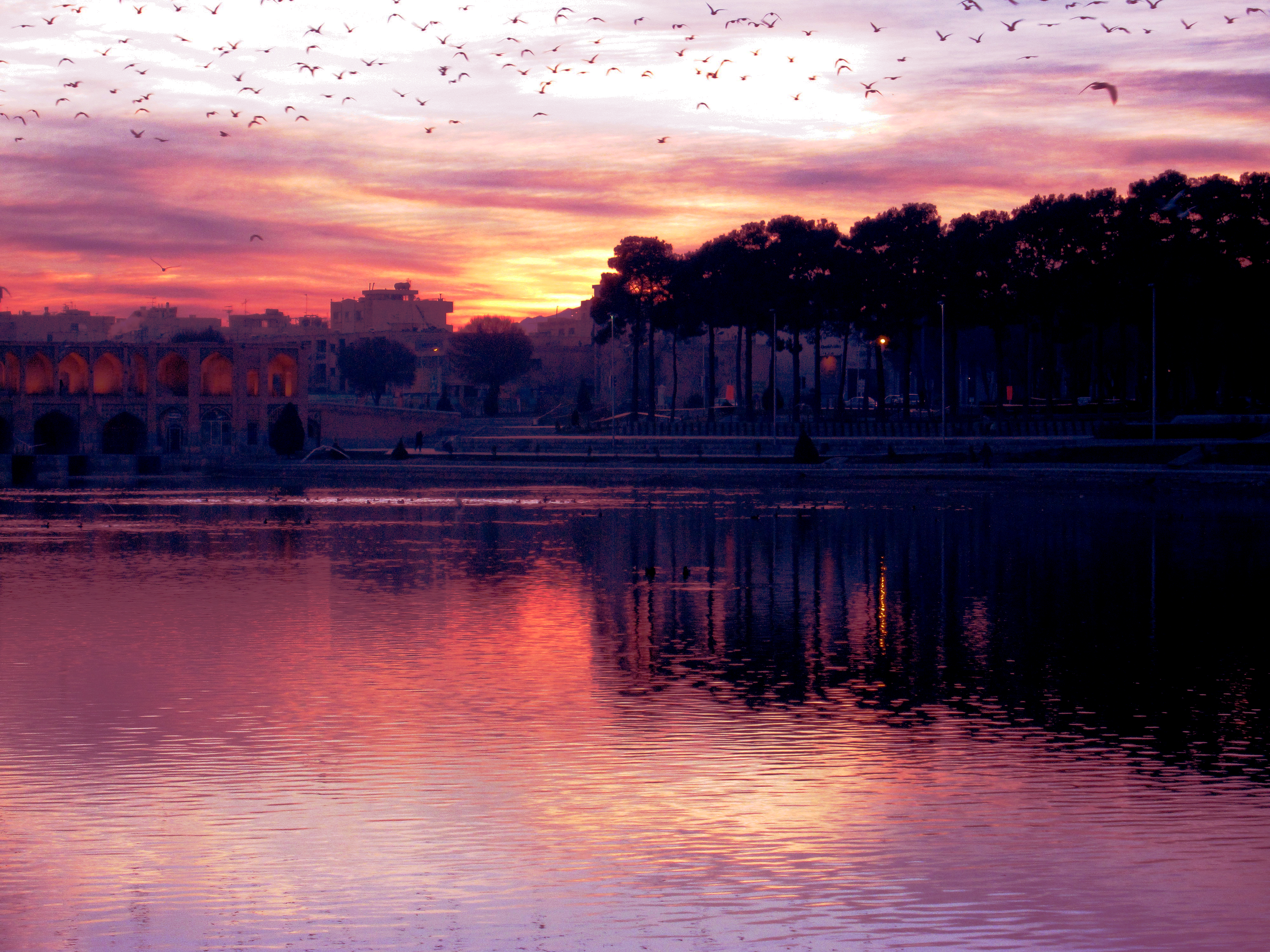
Zayanderud and Khajoo Bridge over it in Isfahan

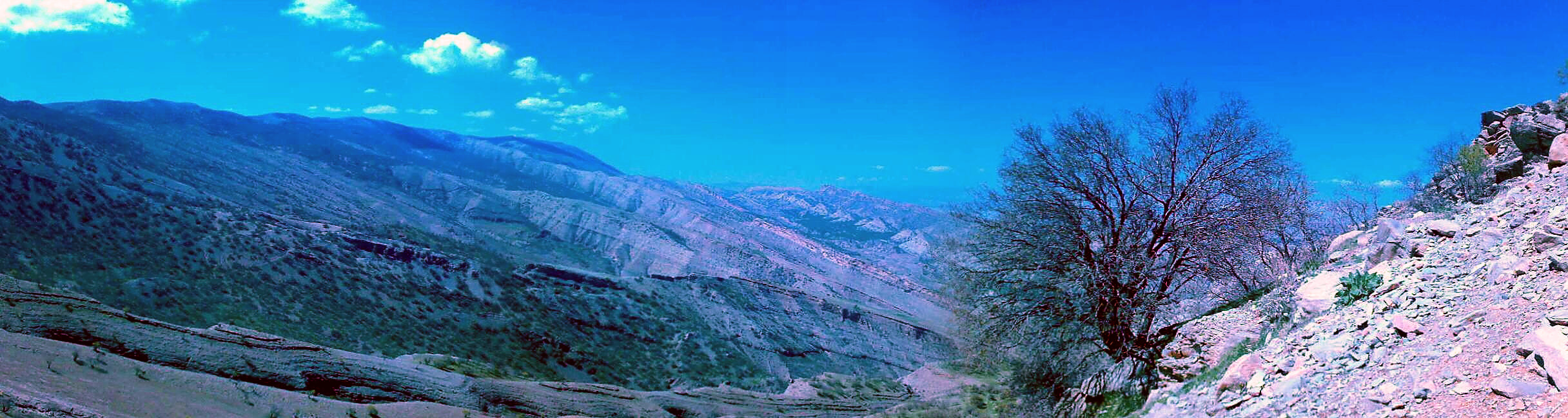
Kabir Kuh ranges, part of Zagros Mountains in Ilam province

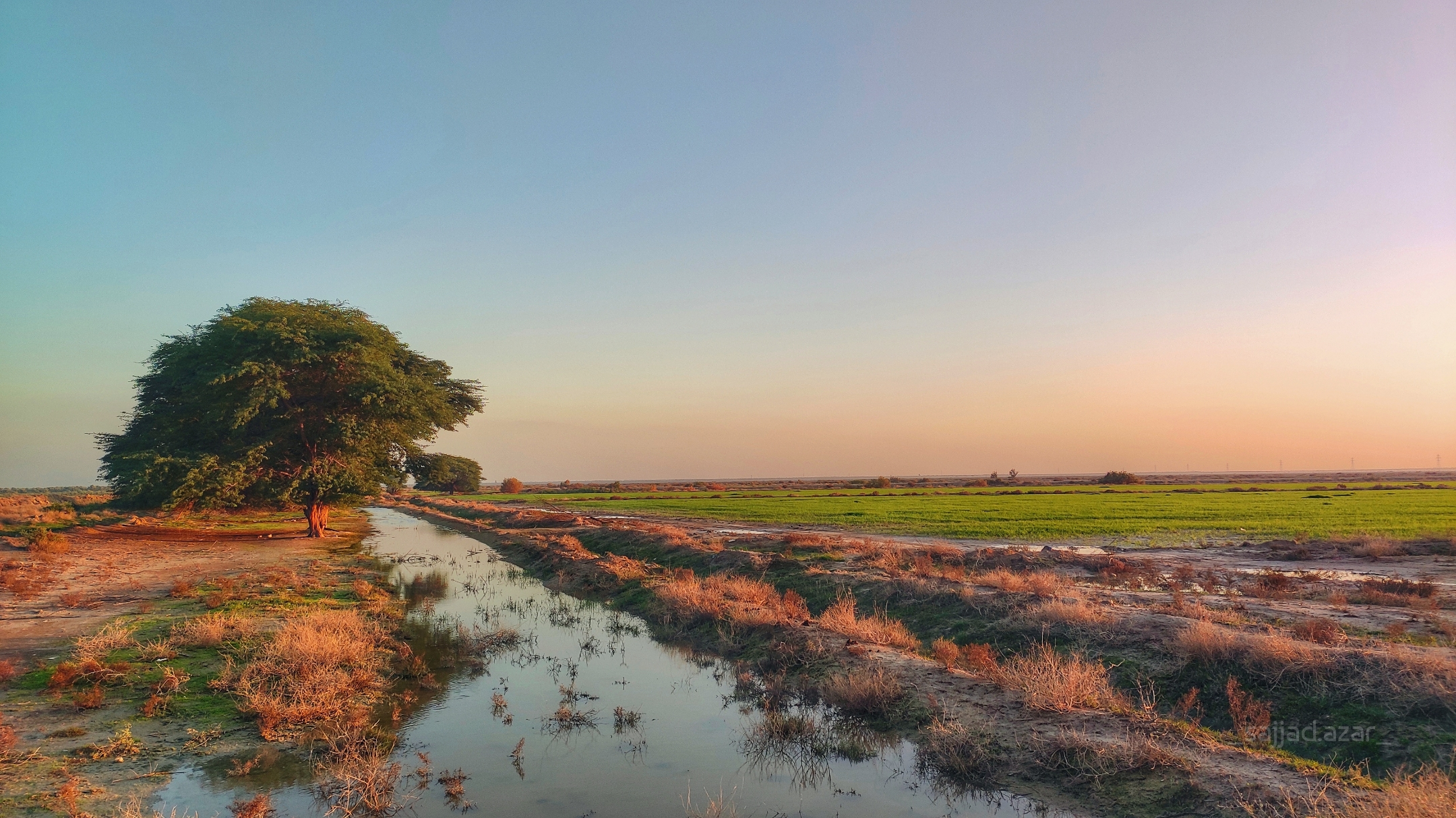
Sunset in Ab-Pakhsh (Bushehr province)

== See also ==
- Armenian highlands
- Caspian Sea
- Elburz Range forest steppe
- Hyrcanian forests
- International rankings of Iran
- List of castles in Iran
- List of caves in Iran
- List of earthquakes in Iran
- List of extreme points of Iran
- List of Iranian four-thousanders
- Provinces of Iran
  - Counties of Iran
    - List of cities in Iran by province
    - List of largest cities of Iran
- Ramsar, Mazandaran: Highest natural radioactivity in the world
- Strait of Hormuz
