= Roodafshan Cave =

Solutional Cave in Roodafshan, Iran

Coordinates: 35.6333°N 52.4834°E

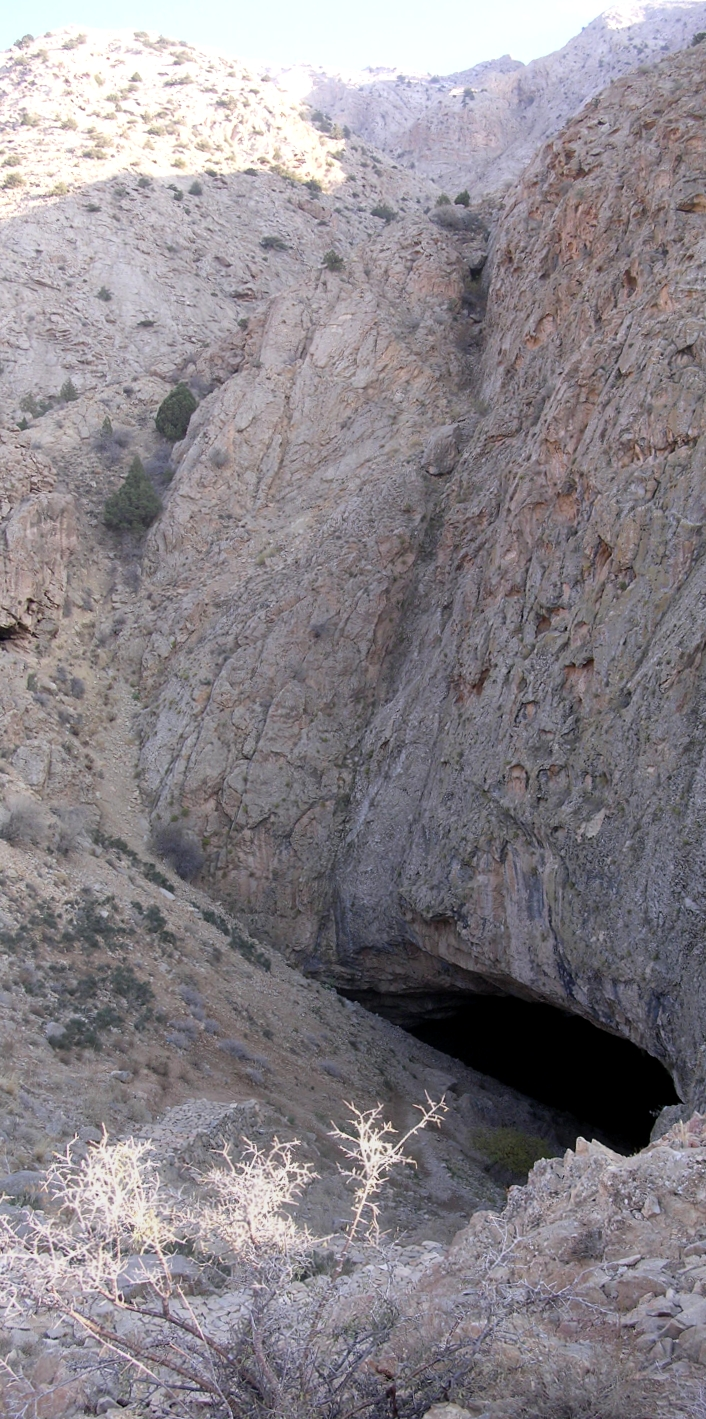
- Entrance area of Roodafshan Cave

Highest point
- Elevation: 1,935 m (6,348 ft)

Geography
- Location: Tehran province / Iran

The Roodafshan Cave (Persian: غار رود افشان, romanized: Ghar-e Roodafshan) is a solutional cave located in Roodafshan valley, Damavand County, Tehran province, Iran, in the Alborz mountains. Since 2003 the Verein für Höhlenkunde in Obersteier (Austria) with the Khaneye Koohnavardan-e-Tehran (Iran) has been surveying Roodafshan Cave.

The length of this spacious cave is 1,502 m with a vertical distance of -90.6 m. The Roodafshan Entrance Hall with 168 m length, 94 m width, 40 m high and 11,395 m^{2} floor area is the second biggest documented cave chamber in Iran.
