= Ghar-e-Pariyan =

Ghar-e-Pariyan is a cave near Isfahan. It is situated at an altitude of 2967 m above sea level. Its entrance measures approximately 1.6 x 1.2 meters. It is located in Iran, not Iraq. Its coordinates are "33°31′41.2″N 51°32′44.1″E".

== See also ==
- Geography of Iran
- List of caves in Iran
