= Darone Cave =

Cave in Iran

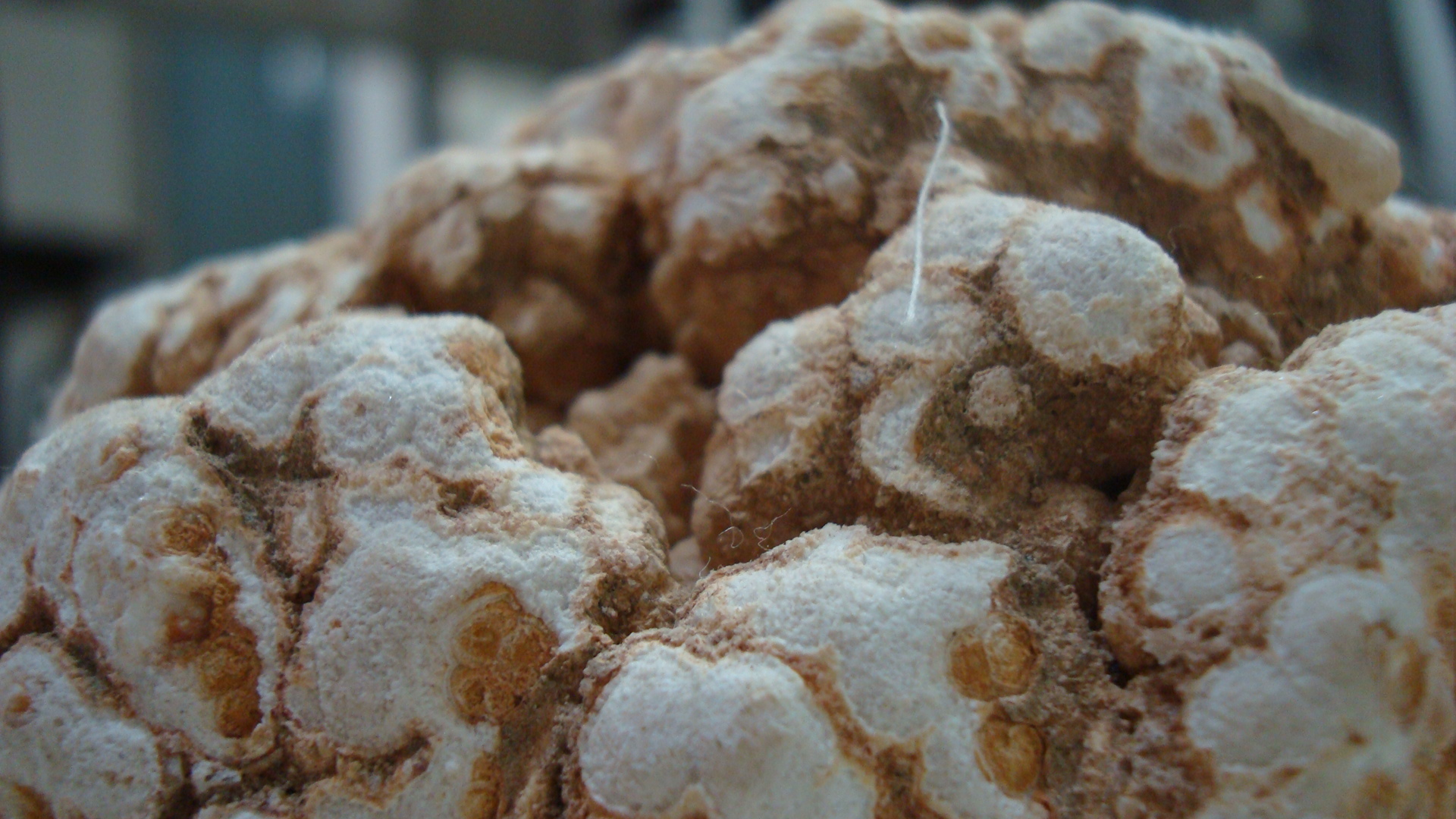
- A rock type discovered in the cave.

- Location within Iran
- Interactive map of Darone Cave
- Coordinates: 35°13′52″N 57°25′20″E

Darone Cave (Persian: غار درونه) is a cave in Bardaskan County, Iran. It is located in Cave Doruneh, Bardaskan.
