= Nam-e Nik =

Village in Semnan province, Iran

Nam-e Nik Persian: نام نيك
- Village
- Location within Iran
- Coordinates: 37°07′33″N 55°41′03″E
- Country: Iran
- Province: Semnan
- County: Meyami
- District: Kalpush
- Rural District: Rezvan

Population (2016)
  - Total: 3,138
- Time zone: UTC+3:30 (IRST)

Nam-e Nik (Persian: نام نيك) (Note: Also romanized as Nām Nīk and Nām-e Nīk; also known as Nāmīn, Nānik, and Nānīn) is a village in Rezvan Rural District (Note: Formerly Nardin Rural District) of Kalpush District in Meyami County, Semnan province, Iran.

== Demographics ==
=== Population ===
At the time of the 2006 National Census, the village's population was 2,682 in 588 households, when it was in the former Meyami District of Shahrud County. The following census in 2011 counted 2,937 people in 820 households. The 2016 census measured the population of the village as 3,138 people in 977 households, by which time the district had been separated from the county in the establishment of Meyami County. The rural district was transferred to the new Kalpush District.
