= Gonbad Kavous University =

University

- دانشگاه گنبد کاووس; Daneshgah-e Gonbad-e Kavus
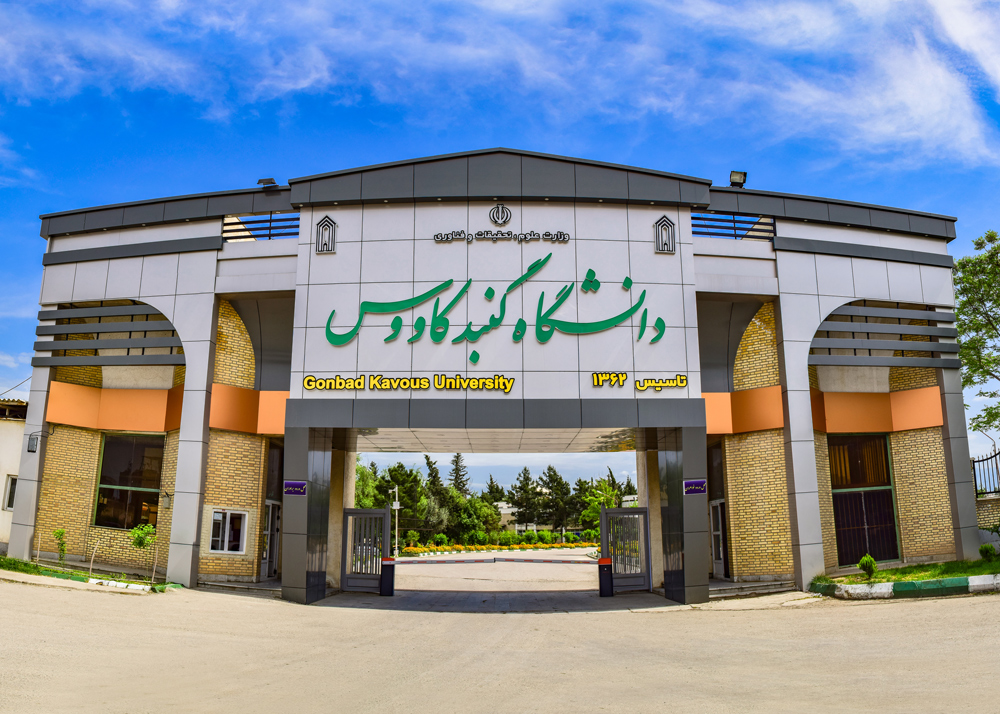
- Former name: Gonbad Kavous Higher Education Complex
- Type: Public
- Established: 1983
- Academic affiliations: Ministry of Science, Research and Technology (Iran)
- Chancellor: Dr. Abbas Biabani
- Academic staff: 150
- Students: 3600
- Location: Gonbad-e Kavus, Golestan province, Iran; 37°15′45.9″N 55°11′10.5″E
- Campus: Urban
- Website: gonbad.ac.ir

Gonbad Kavous University, located in the historic city of Gonbad-e Kavus, is the major higher education institution in the eastern part of Golestan province, Iran. Officially accredited/recognized by the Ministry of Science Research and Technology, Iran, the university is a public and coeducational higher education institution and it offers courses and programs leading to officially recognized higher education degrees such as bachelor, Master and Ph.D. degrees in several areas of study. Gonbad Kavous University also provides several academic and non-academic facilities and services to students including a library, as well as administrative services.

== History ==
Gonbad Kavous University established as a college of agriculture in 1983. The university starts its work with two associate degrees under the supervision of University of Mazandaran. In 1999, the university increased its number of schools and disciplines and expanded as one of the faculties of Gorgan University of Agricultural Sciences and Natural Resources and Agriculture. With the second presidential visit in 2008, the university became separated from Gorgan University and, in October 2008, changed its title to Gonbad Higher Education Complex. Gonbad Higher Education Complex continued its activity with associate, bachelor's and master's degrees in 25 field of studies divided into three main faculties (Faculty of Agricultural Sciences and Natural Resources, Faculty of Science and Engineering, and Faculty of Humanities and Physical Education).

In May 2011, the deputy minister for education of Ministry of Science, Research and Technology announced that Gonbad Higher Education Complex was promoted to Gonbad University. Currently, Gonbad Kavous University has more than 3600 students, and offers 74 field of study and discipline in five faculties and five degree levels.

== Faculties ==
The university has the following faculties and research centers:

- Faculty of Agriculture and Natural Resources
  - Department of Plant Production
  - Department of Animal Science
  - Department of Fisheries and Forestry
  - Department of Pasturage, Watershed and Wood Sciences
- Faculty of Basic Sciences & Engineering
  - Department of Mathematics and Statistics
  - Department of Biology
  - Department of Chemistry
  - Department of Physics
  - Department of Electrical Engineering
  - Department of Informatique
- Faculty of Humanities & Physical Education
  - Department of Economics and Geography
  - Department of Language and Literature
  - Department of Sport Sciences
  - Department of Philosophy
- Minoodasht Engineering
  - Department of Civil Engineering
  - Department of Computer Sciences
- Azadshahr Social Sciences
  - Department of Management Science

== Journals ==
- Journal of Applied Research of Plant Ecophysiology
- Journal of Applied Ichthyological Research
- Journal of Plant Ecosystem Conservation

== Address ==
Basirat Blvd, Shahid Fallshi Str, Gonbad Kavous, P.O. 163

== See also ==
- Higher education in Iran
