= Gorgan =

City in Golestan province, Iran

Gorgan Persian: گرگان Esterabad
- City
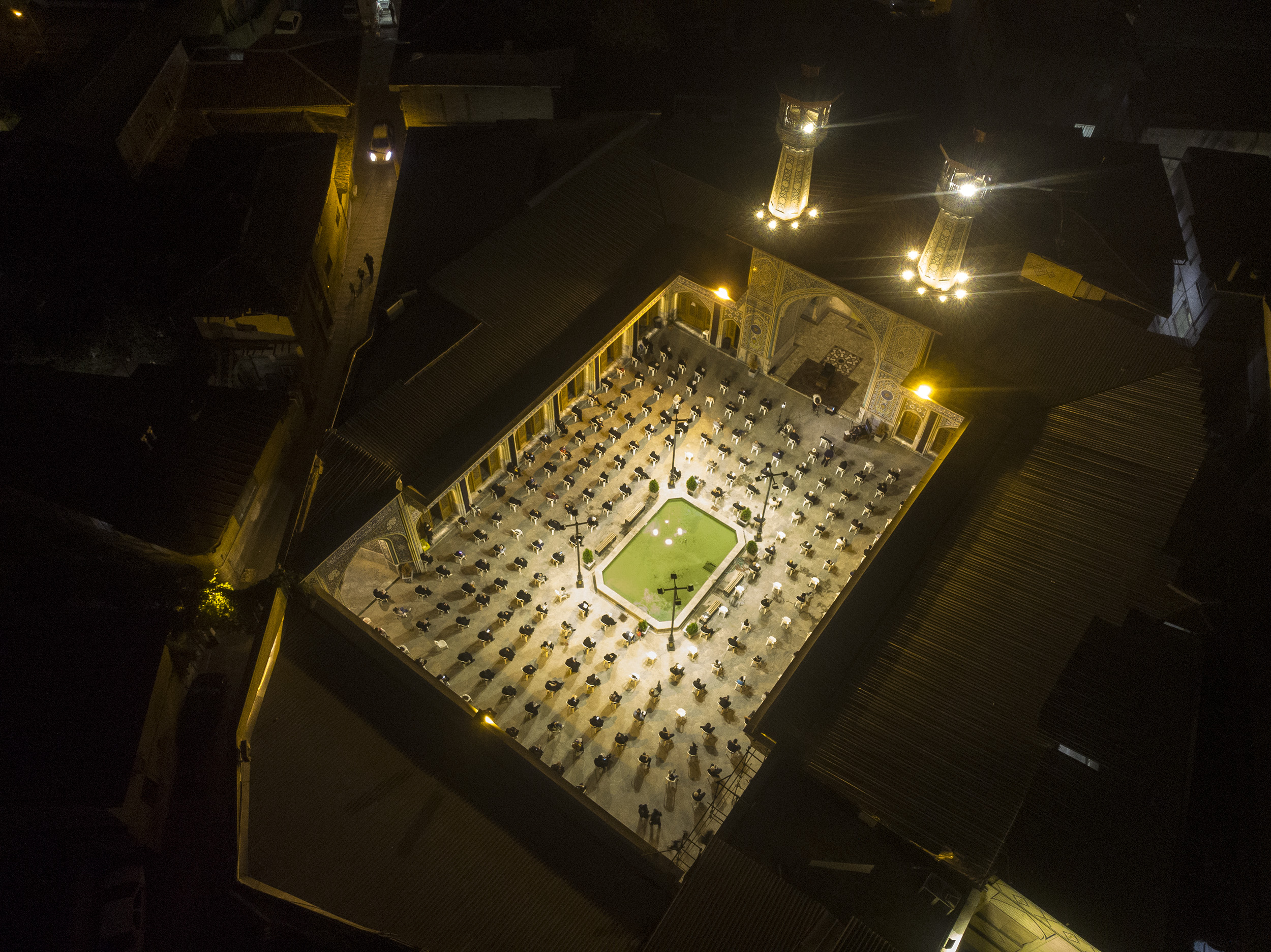
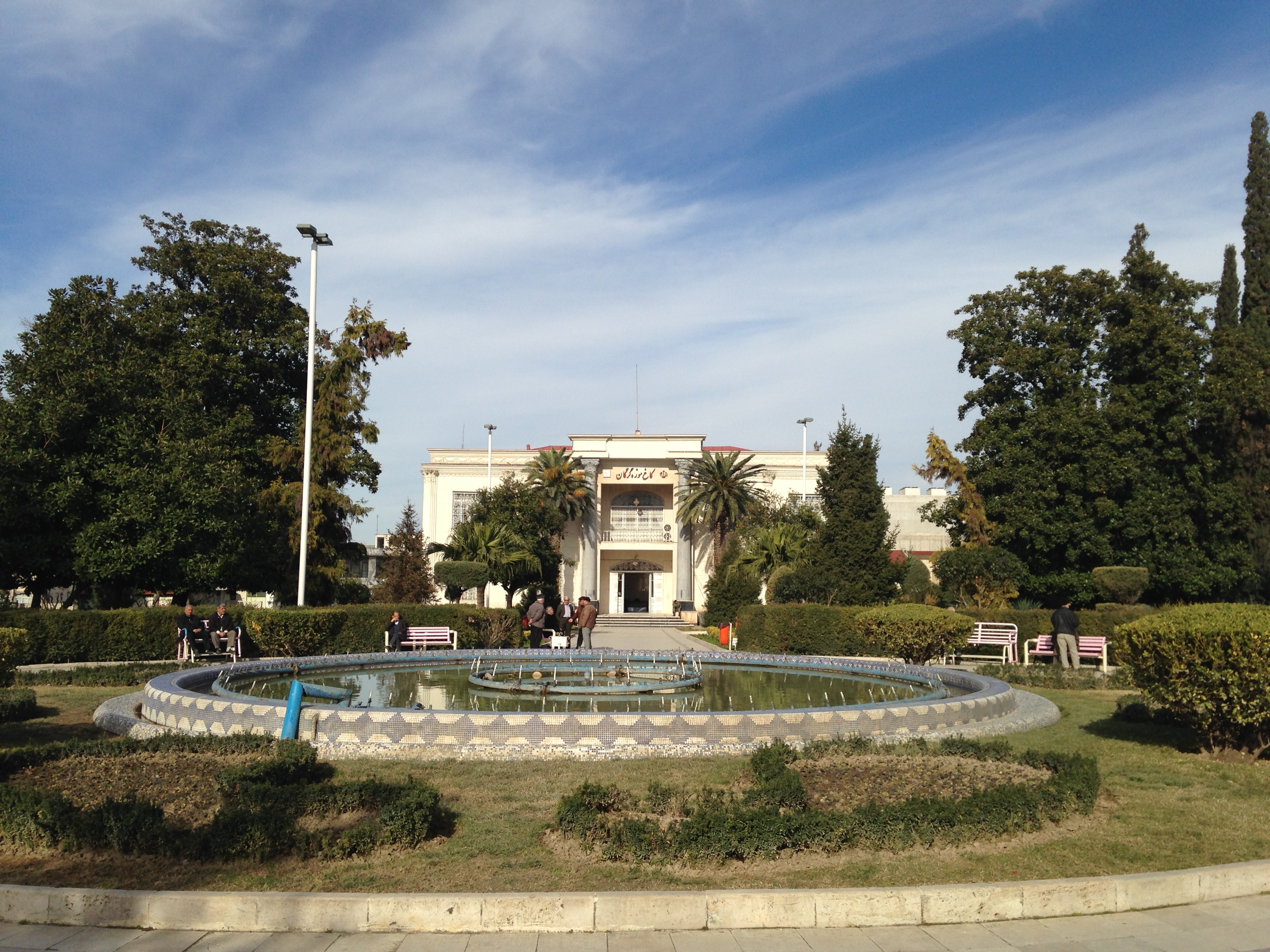
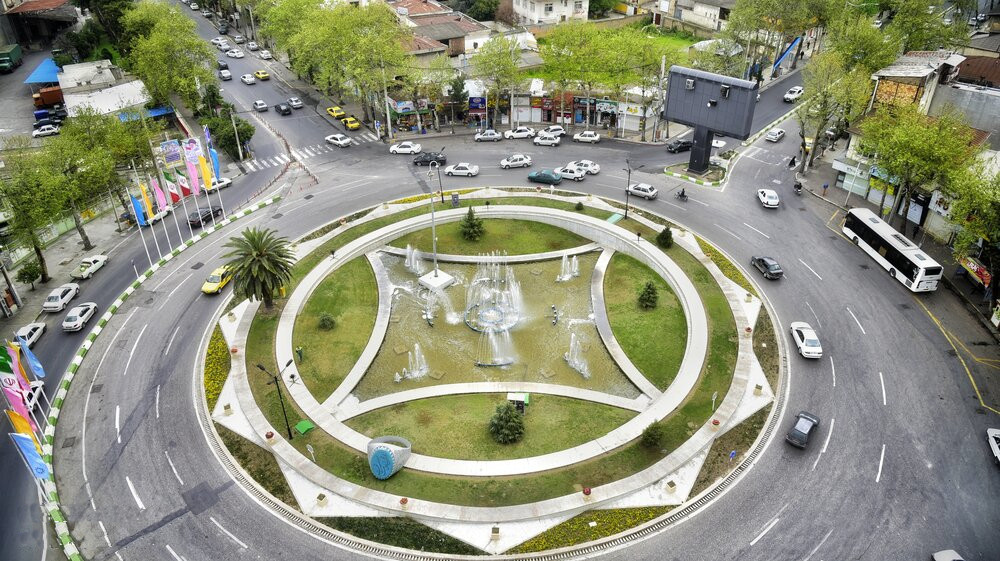
- Gorgan Tower, Gorgan Mosque, Gorgan Palace, Roundabout

- Location within Iran
- Coordinates: 36°50′13″N 54°26′14″E
- Country: Iran
- Province: Golestan
- County: Gorgan
- District: Central

Government
  - Mayor: Mohammad Reza Seyed Alangi
  - City Council Chairperson: Isa Mehri

Area
  - Total: 64 km^{2} (25 sq mi)
- Elevation: 155 m (509 ft)

Population (2016)
  - Total: 350,676
  - Density: 5,500/km^{2} (14,000/sq mi)
  - Population Rank in Iran: 24th
- Time zone: UTC+03:30 (IRST)
- Area code: 017
- Climate: Csa

Gorgan (Persian: گرگان; [ɡoɾˈɡɒːn]) (Note: Also romanized as Gorgān, Gurgān, and Gurgan; formerly Esterabad (استرآباد; Persian pronunciation: [ʔæsˌtæɾɒːˈbɒːd]), also romanized as Astarābād, Asterabad, and Esterābād) is a city in the Central District of Gorgan County, Golestan province, Iran, serving as capital of the province, the county, and the district. It lies approximately 400 km (250 mi) to the northeast of the national capital Tehran, and some 30 km (19 mi) away from the Caspian Sea.

== History ==
There are several archaeological sites near Gorgan, including Tureng Tepe and Shah Tepe, in which remains dating from the Neolithic and Chalcolithic eras. Some other important Neolithic sites in the area are Yarim Tepe, and Sange Chaxmaq. The nearby Shahroud Plain has many such sites. More than 50 are on the Gorgan Plain.

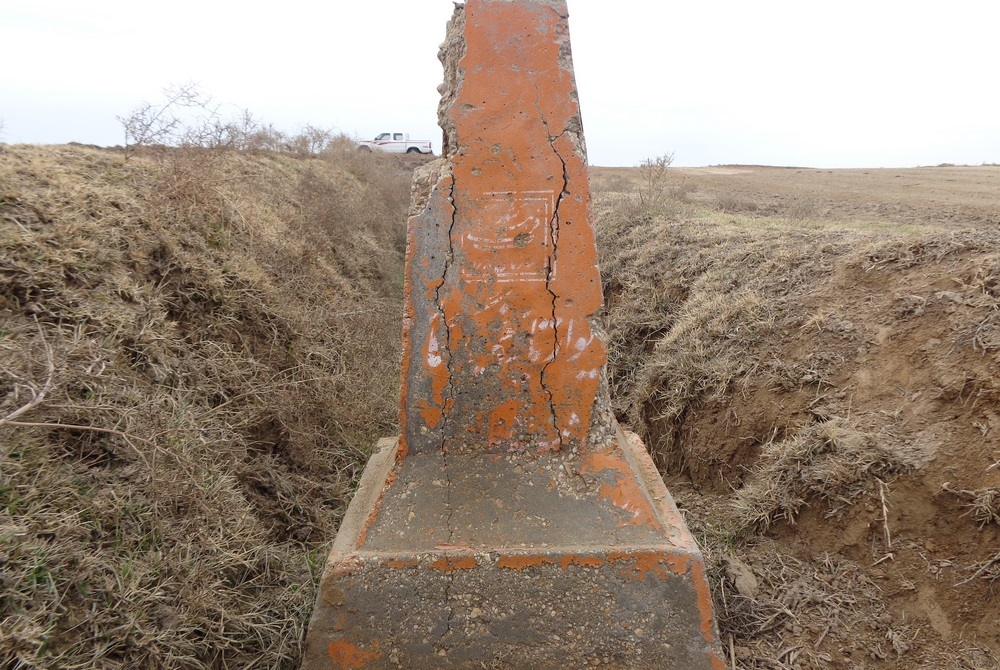
Historic wall of Gorgan signs

According to the Greek historian Arrian, Zadracarta was the largest city of Hyrcania and the site of the "royal palace". The term means "the yellow city", and it was given to it from the great number of oranges, lemons, and other fruit trees which grew in the outskirts of that city.

Hyrcania became part of the Achaemenid Empire during the reign of Cyrus the Great (559–530 BC), its founder, or his successor Cambyses (530-522 BC).

The Great Wall of Gorgan, the second biggest defensive wall in the world, was built in the Parthian and Sasanian periods.

At the time of the Sasanians, "Gurgan" appeared as the name of a city, province capital, and province.

Gorgan maintained its independence as a Zoroastrian state even after Persia was conquered by the Muslim Arabs in the 7th century.

In 1210, the city was invaded and sacked by the army of Kingdom of Georgia under command of the brothers Mkhargrdzeli.

"Old Gorgan" was destroyed during the Mongol invasion in the 13th century, and the center of the region was moved to what was called "Astarabad", which is currently called "Gorgan".

Gorgan with its surrounding regions was sometimes considered part of the Tabaristan region.

Astarabad was an important political and religious city during the Qajar era.

== Demographics ==
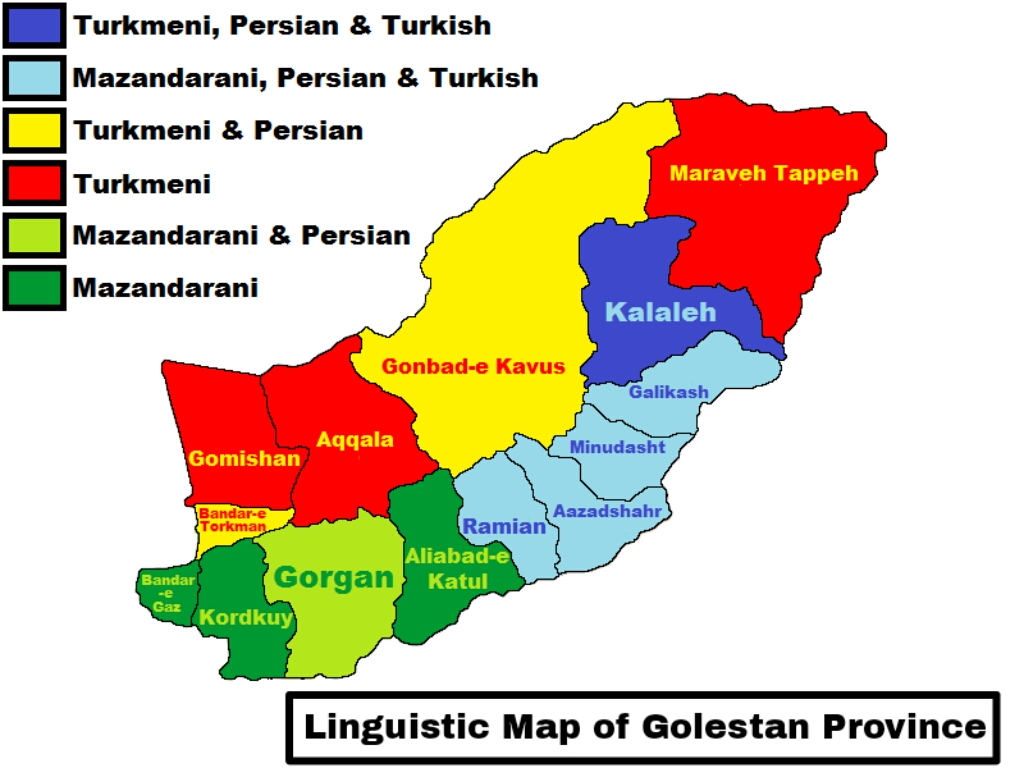
Linguistic Map of Golestan province

=== Population ===
At the time of the 2006 National Census, the city's population was 269,226 in 73,702 households. The following census in 2011 counted 329,536 people in 98,019 households. The 2016 census measured the population of the city as 350,676 people in 111,099 households.

== Geography ==
=== Location ===
The wide Dasht-e Gorgan (Plains of Gorgan) is located north of the city and geographically bounded by 37°00' - 37°30' north latitude and 54°00' - 54°30' east longitude, covering an area of about 170 square kilometres (66 sq mi).

Some 150 km (93 mi) east of Gorgan is the Golestan National Park, home to a large portion of the fauna of Iran.

Gorgān Dam is situated 60 km northeast of Gorgan city and has a capacity of 100 million cubic meters.

=== Climate ===
Gorgan has a subtropical mediterranean climate (Köppen: Csa, Trewartha: Cs), with hot, humid summers and cool, wet winters. In general, Golestan has a moderate and humid climate known as "the moderate Caspian climate". The effective factors behind such a climate are Alborz mountain range, the direction of the mountains, the height of the area, the neighborhood to the sea, vegetation surface, local winds, altitude, and weather fronts. As a result of the above factors, three different climates exist in the region: plain moderate, mountainous, and semi-arid. Gorgan valley has a semi-arid climate. The average annual temperature is 17.8 °C (64.0 °F).

The annual precipitation is roughly 584 millimetres (23.0 in), and usually does not exceed 700 millimetres (28 in) or dip below 350 millimetres (14 in). The driest year on record was 1953 with only 182.7 millimetres (7.19 in) of precipitation, while the wettest year was 1959 with 1,579.9 millimetres (62.20 in).

Highest recorded temperature:46.2 °C (115.2 °F)

Lowest recorded temperature:−11.8 °C (10.8 °F) on 7 January 2008.

Climate data for Gorgan 36.905°N 54.413°E (1991-2020, Extremes 1952-2020) (Note: Rainy days calculated using parameters 46 and 71 from the source)
Month	Jan	Feb	Mar	Apr	May	Jun	Jul	Aug	Sep	Oct	Nov	Dec	Year
Record high °C (°F)	29.0 (84.2)	32.4 (90.3)	35.0 (95.0)	39.8 (103.6)	46.2 (115.2)	45.0 (113.0)	44.0 (111.2)	44.0 (111.2)	42.8 (109.0)	41.2 (106.2)	36.0 (96.8)	29.2 (84.6)	46.2 (115.2)
Mean daily maximum °C (°F)	12.8 (55.0)	13.4 (56.1)	16.6 (61.9)	21.4 (70.5)	28.0 (82.4)	32.2 (90.0)	33.5 (92.3)	33.8 (92.8)	30.8 (87.4)	25.8 (78.4)	18.8 (65.8)	14.3 (57.7)	23.5 (74.2)
Daily mean °C (°F)	6.7 (44.1)	7.5 (45.5)	10.5 (50.9)	15.0 (59.0)	20.9 (69.6)	25.7 (78.3)	27.8 (82.0)	27.8 (82.0)	24.5 (76.1)	18.8 (65.8)	12.6 (54.7)	8.3 (46.9)	17.2 (62.9)
Mean daily minimum °C (°F)	1.9 (35.4)	2.7 (36.9)	5.5 (41.9)	9.6 (49.3)	14.8 (58.6)	19.8 (67.6)	22.9 (73.2)	22.7 (72.9)	19.3 (66.7)	13.2 (55.8)	7.5 (45.5)	3.5 (38.3)	11.9 (53.5)
Record low °C (°F)	−11.8 (10.8)	−7.4 (18.7)	−3.7 (25.3)	−1.4 (29.5)	1.4 (34.5)	10.0 (50.0)	15.0 (59.0)	13.0 (55.4)	9.0 (48.2)	1.8 (35.2)	−5.9 (21.4)	−7.0 (19.4)	−11.8 (10.8)
Average precipitation mm (inches)	53.8 (2.12)	55.2 (2.17)	66.1 (2.60)	43.9 (1.73)	31.7 (1.25)	24.9 (0.98)	17.4 (0.69)	19.3 (0.76)	38.6 (1.52)	52.9 (2.08)	66.3 (2.61)	46.1 (1.81)	516.2 (20.32)
Average snowfall cm (inches)	1.6 (0.6)	2.6 (1.0)	0.1 (0.0)	0.1 (0.0)	0.0 (0.0)	0.0 (0.0)	0.0 (0.0)	0.0 (0.0)	0.0 (0.0)	0.0 (0.0)	0.0 (0.0)	0.2 (0.1)	4.6 (1.7)
Average extreme snow depth cm (inches)	0.62 (0.24)	0.88 (0.35)	0.1 (0.0)	0 (0)	0 (0)	0 (0)	0 (0)	0 (0)	0 (0)	0 (0)	0.28 (0.11)	0.07 (0.03)	0.88 (0.35)
Average precipitation days (≥ 1.0 mm)	6.4	7.4	8.5	6.9	4.7	3	3	3	4	4.5	5.8	5.9	63.1
Average rainy days	9.3	10.6	13.7	12.5	9.5	6.3	5.8	5.1	6.2	7.5	9	8.9	104.4
Average snowy days	0.8	1.4	0.4	0	0	0	0	0	0	0	0	0.3	2.9
Average relative humidity (%)	80	79	79	78	71	65	67	69	71	73	78	81	74
Average dew point °C (°F)	3.6 (38.5)	4.2 (39.6)	7.1 (44.8)	11.1 (52.0)	15.0 (59.0)	18.1 (64.6)	20.8 (69.4)	21.2 (70.2)	18.5 (65.3)	13.6 (56.5)	8.8 (47.8)	5.4 (41.7)	12.3 (54.1)
Mean monthly sunshine hours	147	132	145	166	226	248	243	256	217	206	159	142	2,287
Source 1: NCEI.NOAA (Snowfall and Snow/Sleet days 1981-2010)
Source 2: IRIMO(snow depth)(Extremes 1952-2010)

Climate data for Gorgan
Month	Jan	Feb	Mar	Apr	May	Jun	Jul	Aug	Sep	Oct	Nov	Dec	Year
Record high °C (°F)	29 (84)	32.4 (90.3)	35 (95)	39 (102)	43 (109)	45 (113)	44 (111)	44 (111)	41.6 (106.9)	39 (102)	36 (97)	29.2 (84.6)	45 (113)
Mean daily maximum °C (°F)	12.4 (54.3)	13.2 (55.8)	15.5 (59.9)	21.2 (70.2)	27.0 (80.6)	31.1 (88.0)	32.8 (91.0)	32.8 (91.0)	30.0 (86.0)	24.9 (76.8)	18.9 (66.0)	14.4 (57.9)	22.8 (73.1)
Daily mean °C (°F)	7.8 (46.0)	8.6 (47.5)	10.9 (51.6)	15.9 (60.6)	21.2 (70.2)	25.5 (77.9)	27.8 (82.0)	27.9 (82.2)	24.8 (76.6)	19.5 (67.1)	13.9 (57.0)	9.8 (49.6)	17.8 (64.0)
Mean daily minimum °C (°F)	3.2 (37.8)	3.8 (38.8)	6.2 (43.2)	10.6 (51.1)	15.5 (59.9)	19.9 (67.8)	22.9 (73.2)	22.9 (73.2)	19.6 (67.3)	14.0 (57.2)	8.8 (47.8)	5.1 (41.2)	12.7 (54.9)
Record low °C (°F)	−11.8 (10.8)	−6 (21)	−3.2 (26.2)	−1.4 (29.5)	2.8 (37.0)	10 (50)	15 (59)	13 (55)	9 (48)	3 (37)	−2 (28)	−7 (19)	−11.8 (10.8)
Average precipitation mm (inches)	54.0 (2.13)	55.5 (2.19)	76.7 (3.02)	51.4 (2.02)	42.1 (1.66)	31.4 (1.24)	20.7 (0.81)	26.2 (1.03)	39.5 (1.56)	62.8 (2.47)	67.1 (2.64)	56.4 (2.22)	583.8 (22.99)
Average precipitation days	9.6	10.4	13.6	11.2	8.8	6.7	5.8	6.3	7.2	7.4	8.3	8.8	104.1
Average snowy days	1.5	1.8	0.6	0.0	0.0	0.0	0.0	0.0	0.0	0.0	0.1	0.5	4.5
Average relative humidity (%)	74	74	75	73	68	64	65	68	69	70	73	75	71
Mean monthly sunshine hours	138.7	129.3	135.3	161.7	206.4	225.6	224.1	227.9	202.5	198.2	156.2	135.1	2,141
Source 1: Synoptic Stations Statistics
Source 2: IRIMO(Snow and Sleet days 1952-2010)

== Sports ==
Gorgan has a sports venue, Shohada stadium, which is located north of the city limits near the village of Karimabad.

Shahrdari Gorgan competes in the Iranian Basketball Super League and Etka Gorgan F.C. competes in the Azadegan League.

== Education ==
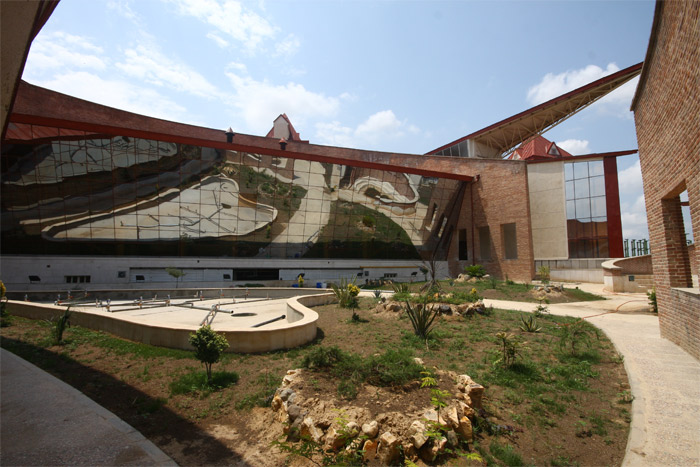
Mirdamad Cultural Institute (MCI)

- Golestan University
- Golestan University of Medical Sciences
- Gorgan University
- Islamic Azad University of Gorgan
- Lamei Gorgani institute of Higher Education

== Notable people ==
=== Historical ===
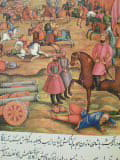
Picture showing Mirza Mehdi Khan Astarabadi in pink clothes and Nader Shah Afshar on horseback.

- Fakhroddin Asaad Gorgani, 11th-century Persian poet and the composer of Vis and Ramin.
- Abu Sa'id al-Darir al-Jurjani, 9th century astronomer and mathematician
- Al-Masihi, 10th century physician and teacher of Avicenna
- Abd al-Qāhir al-Jurjānī, 11th century grammarian and literary theorist
- Zayn al-Din al-Jurjani, 12th century royal physician
- Bahram al-Da'i, 12th-century Nizari Ismaili missionary and military leader in Syria
- Fazlallah Astarabadi (Naimi), 14th century mystic and founder of Hurufism
- Rustam Gorgani, 16th century physician
- Mir Fendereski, philosopher, poet and mysti
- Mir Damad, 17th century Islamic scholar and Neoplatonic philosopher
- Mirza Mehdi Khan Astarabadi, 18th century chief minister to Nader Shah
- Bibi Khatoon Astarabadi, writer, satirist and feminist
- Firishta, historian
- Sardar Rafie Yanehsari, Governor of Astarabad
- Agha Mohammad Khan Qajar, Shah of Iran (1789–1797) noted for the reunification of Iran

=== Modern ===
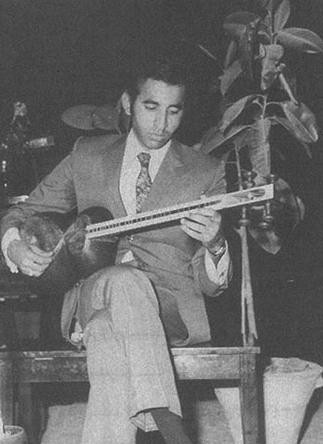
Mohammad Reza Lotfi

- Iraj Etesam, Iranian architect, educator and author; born in Gorgan.
- Nader Ebrahimi, author, poet, director and researcher
- Hossein Khanzadi, admiral in the Iranian Navy
- Mohammad Reza Lotfi, traditional Persian musician
- Maryam Zandi, photographer
- Parham Maghsoodloo, Chess grandmaster
- Emad Rajabloo, writer, director and actor
- Hooshmand Dehghan, translator

== Sister cities ==
- Aktau, Kazakhstan
- Guangzhou, China
- Samsun, Turkey (2006)

== See also ==
- Gorgan International Airport
- al-Jurjani
- Gorgan-rud River
- Gurganj

Media related to Gorgan at Wikimedia Commons
