= Abdol Ghayoom Ebrahimi =

Abdol Ghayoom Ebrahimi (also may written as Abdol Gh. Ebrahimi), (born 1932 in Gorgan, Iran), founder of Islamic Azad University of Gorgan, has been an visiting professor of the University of Illinois at Urbana-Champaign in the United States. He served as the first chancellor of Islamic Azad University of Gorgan for twelve years and is now a professor of plant pathology there. The Minister of Science, Research and Technology of the Islamic Republic of Iran has selected him recently as a member board of discriminatives for the scientific advancement of professors serving in the University of Golestan, Gorgan.

He has received many awards, such as research grant of the National Science Foundation of the United States, letter of appreciation of deputy of the leader of Iran, letter of appreciation of the president of Iran, Minister of Agriculture, the President of Islamic Azad University and governors of Golestan.

== Sources ==
- / Abdol-Ghayoom Ebrahimi @Phytomed, Biological DataBank of Germany

== See also ==
- Islamic Azad University of Gorgan
