= Golestan University =

Public University in Gorgan, Golestan Province, Iran

Coordinates: 36°50′35″N 54°26′28″E

- دانشگاه گلستان; Dāneshgāh-e Golestân
- Motto: به دانش گرای و بدو شو بلند
- Type: Public
- Established: 1957; 2008 (Separated from Gorgan University of Agricultural Sciences and Natural Resources)
- Academic affiliation: Ministry of Science, Research and Technology (Iran)
- President: Alireza Khajeh Shahkoohi
- Academic staff: 175
- Total staff: 182
- Students: nearly 4950
- Location: Gorgan, Golestan, Iran
- Campus: Urban, 100 hectares
- Website: http://www.gu.ac.ir

University rankings

Global – Overall
- THE World: 600-800 (2025)

Golestan University is a public university located in Gorgan, a large city bordering the Caspian Sea, in the province of Golestan, in north-eastern Iran. It separated from the Gorgan University of Agricultural Sciences and Natural Resources, which was established in 1957, in 2008; Admission to Golestan University as a publicly funded university is through a highly competitive entrance exam called Nationwide University Entrance Exams. Golestan University has close ties with Golestan Science and Technology Park, Golestan University of Medical Sciences and Gorgan University of Agricultural Sciences and Natural Resources. GU offers a wide range of courses in the three faculties: Humanities, Sciences, and Engineering and Technology (in two campuses).

With 175 academic staff, The University has four faculties and various research centers. There are nearly 7000 students in 72 fields of study, including undergraduate, postgraduate and research scholars leading to B.Sc., B.Eng., M.Sc., B.A., M.A., and Ph.D. degrees.

== History ==
Golestan University traces its roots back to the establishment of Gorgan University of Agricultural Sciences and Natural Resources in 1957. In 2008, Golestan University emerged as an independent institution, separating from its agricultural counterpart.

== Admission ==
Admission to Golestan University is determined through the Nationwide University Entrance Exams.

== Collaborations and Partnerships ==
Golestan University maintains ties with key entities such as [Golestan Science and Technology Park], [Golestan University of Medical Sciences], and [Gorgan University of Agricultural Sciences and Natural Resources].

== Faculties and Majors ==
Golestan University is organized into three faculties, each offering a range of academic programs:

=== Faculty of Sciences ===
This faculty houses seven departments that offer programs in Mathematics, Physics, Chemistry, Biology, Geology, Statistics, and Computer Science. The faculty has 45 academic staff and serves 1200 students.

==== B.S. (Level) ====
- Biology
- Chemistry
- Geology
- Mathematics and Computer Sciences
- Physics
- Statistics

==== M.S. (Level) ====
- Biology
- Chemistry
- Geology
- Mathematics
- Physics
- Statistics

==== PhD (Level) ====
- Biology
- Chemistry
- Geology
- Mathematics

=== Faculty of Humanities and Social Sciences ===
Comprising six departments, this faculty offers programs in Persian Language and Literature, English Language and Literature, Islamic Studies and Theology, Social and Political Sciences, Physical Education, and Management. With 50 academic staff and 1500 students.

==== B.S. (Level) ====
- Economics
- English Language and Literature
- Geography
- Islamic Studies
- Law
- Management
- Persian Language and Literature
- Social Sciences
- Physical Education and Sport Sciences

==== M.S. (Level) ====
- Economy
- English Language and Literature
- Geography
- Islamic Studies
- Law
- Persian Language and Literature
- Social Sciences

=== Faculty of Engineering and Technology (Gorgan Campus) ===
This faculty consists of six departments offering programs in Civil Engineering, Mechanical Engineering, Electrical Engineering, Chemical Engineering, Polymer Engineering, and Architecture. With 40 academic staff and 1000 students.

==== B.S. (Level) ====
- Architecture and Art
- Computer Engineering
- Civil Engineering
- Electrical Engineering
- Industrial Engineering
- Mechanical Engineering
- Polymer Engineering
- Chemical Engineering
- Surveying Engineering

==== M.S. (Level) ====
- Architecture and Art
- Computer Engineering
- Civil Engineering
- Electrical Engineering
- Industrial Engineering
- Mechanical Engineering
- Polymer Engineering
- Chemical Engineering
- Surveying Engineering

=== Faculty of Engineering and Technology (Ali-Abad Katoul Campus) ===
This faculty, established in 2006, offers programs in Computer Software Engineering and Survey Engineering.

== See also ==
- Education in Iran
- Higher Education in Iran
- List of Iranian scientists
- Modern Iranian scientists and engineers
