= Shima Hajimirza =

Iranian-American mechanical engineer

- Occupations: Mechanical engineer; professor
- Employer: Stevens Institute of Technology
- Known for: Research in heat transfer and solar energy systems

Shima Hajimirza is an Iranian-American mechanical engineer whose research focuses on heat transfer, the data-driven design and modeling of solar panels, and the combination of these ideas in radiative cooling of solar panels to improve their efficiency. She is an associate professor of mechanical engineering at the Stevens Institute of Technology.

Shima Hajimirza is an Iranian-American mechanical engineer whose research focuses on heat transfer, the data-driven design and modeling of solar panels, and the combination of these ideas in radiative cooling of solar panels to improve their efficiency. She is an associate professor of mechanical engineering at the Stevens Institute of Technology.

== Education and career ==
Hajimirza has a 2003 bachelor's degree from the University of Mazandaran in Iran, a 2007 master's degree in mechanical engineering from Southern Illinois University Edwardsville, and a 2010 master's degree in bioengineering from the California Institute of Technology. She returned to mechanical engineering for her Ph.D., completed in 2013 at the University of Texas at Austin. Her dissertation, Optimization, design and performance analysis of light trapping structures in thin film solar cells, was supervised by John R. Howell.

After continuing at the University of Texas as a postdoctoral researcher in the Institute for Computational Engineering and Science and as an adjunct professor at Tennessee State University, she became an assistant professor of mechanical engineering at Texas A&M University in 2016. She moved to the Stevens Institute of Technology in 2020 and was promoted to associate professor in 2024.

== Recognition ==
In 2024, the American Society of Mechanical Engineers (ASME) named Hajimirza as a rising star in mechanical engineering, and as an ASME Fellow. She also received the National Science Foundation CAREER Award, and the Stevens Institute's Harvey N. Davis Distinguished Teaching Assistant Professor award.
