= Islamic Azad University, Gorgan Branch =

Private university in Gorgan, Iran

- دانشگاه آزاد اسلامی واحد گرگان; Danushgah-e Âzad-e Eslâmi-ye Vahed-e Gârgan
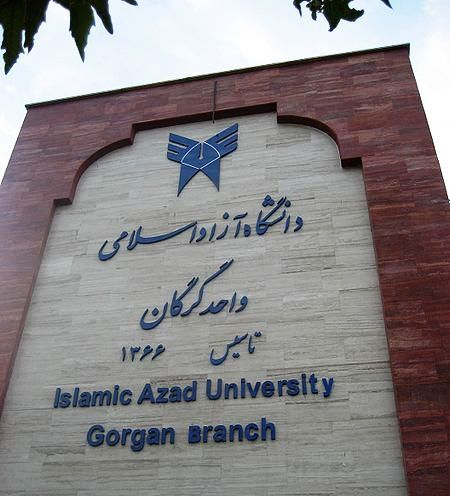
- Type: Private
- Established: 1988
- Chancellor: Dr. Seyed Ali Taheri
- Faculty: 107
- Students: 6,000 (48 majors)
- Location: Gorgan, Golestan province, Iran
- Campus: Urban
- Website: www.gorganiau.ac.ir//

The Islamic Azad University, Gorgan Branch (also known as Azad University of Gorgan) is a campus of Islamic Azad University system in Iran.

== History ==
The university came of age under the direction of Abdol Ghayoom Ebrahimi, who was the first university chancellor during 1988–2000.

This university started its work with three majors (civil engineering, biology and agricultural engineering) and 60 students in 1988. It was then situated in Gorgan's Jorjan Street. Since then, the university has grown both in quantity and quality. At present, it has +500 faculty members, and approximately 13,000 students in B.S., M.S. and PhD of 48 majors.

== Academics ==
=== Academic Campus ===
Founded in 1988, the campus is located in Gorgan, Golestan province, occupying about 40 acres (160,000 m^{2}) in the city of Gorgan in the province of Golestan, in northern Iran.

=== Education ===
At Present, Islamic Azad University of Gorgan is offering over 500 courses in 48 degree programs. The university awards bachelor's degrees, master's degrees and Doctor of Philosophy each year. The average class consists of 25 students (not including lab classes and discussion sections led by graduate student instructors).

=== Faculty members ===
Academic staff of the university has consisted of +500 faculty members, and includes full Professors, associate professors, assistant professors and instructors.

=== Alumni ===
Islamic Azad University of Gorgan has graduated many students who have gone on to earn doctorates in Iran and other countries, such as the United States. The acceptance rate to entrance examinations of master's degree, competitive all over the country, is notable. For example, Nora Taghavi, a graduate of Islamic Azad University of Gorgan, is now a graduate student in the Molecular, Cellular and Developmental Biology (MCDB) Department of the University of California at Santa Barbara, CA, in the United States.

== Organization ==
=== Chancellors ===
The position of chancellor was created in 1988; there have since been three inaugurated chancellors and two acting chancellors:

	Chancellors of Islamic Azad University of Gorgan	Years as Chancellor
1	Abdol Gh. Ebrahimi	(1988–2000)
2	H.R. Jalilian	(2000, acting)
3	S.M. Kasaee-Hamedani	(2000–04)
4	B. Bakhtiari-Saeed	(2004, acting)
5	R.A. Mohseni	(2004–2013)
6	Hossein Ajam Nouruzi	(2013–2014)
7	Aryan Sateei	(2014–2017)
8	Seyed Ali Taheri	(2017–Present)

=== Administration ===
The Chancellor has five Vice Chancellors:

	Name and affiliated Department	Vice Chancellor of Islamic Azad University of Gorgan
1	H. Zahmatkesh, Dept. of Mathematics	Education Vice Chancellor
2	M. Mazandarani, Dept. of Biology	Research Vice Chancellor
3	N. Moslemipour, Dept. of Mathematics	Student Affairs Vice Chancellor
4	A. Mesbah, Dept. of Civil Engineering	Planning & Development Vice Chancellor
5	M. Fallah, Dept. of Education	Adm. & Financial Vice Chancellor

== See also ==
- Higher education in Iran
- Abdol Ghayoom Ebrahimi
