= Emad Rajabloo =

Iranian director, writer, designer, and actor

عمادالدین رجبلو Emad Rajabloo
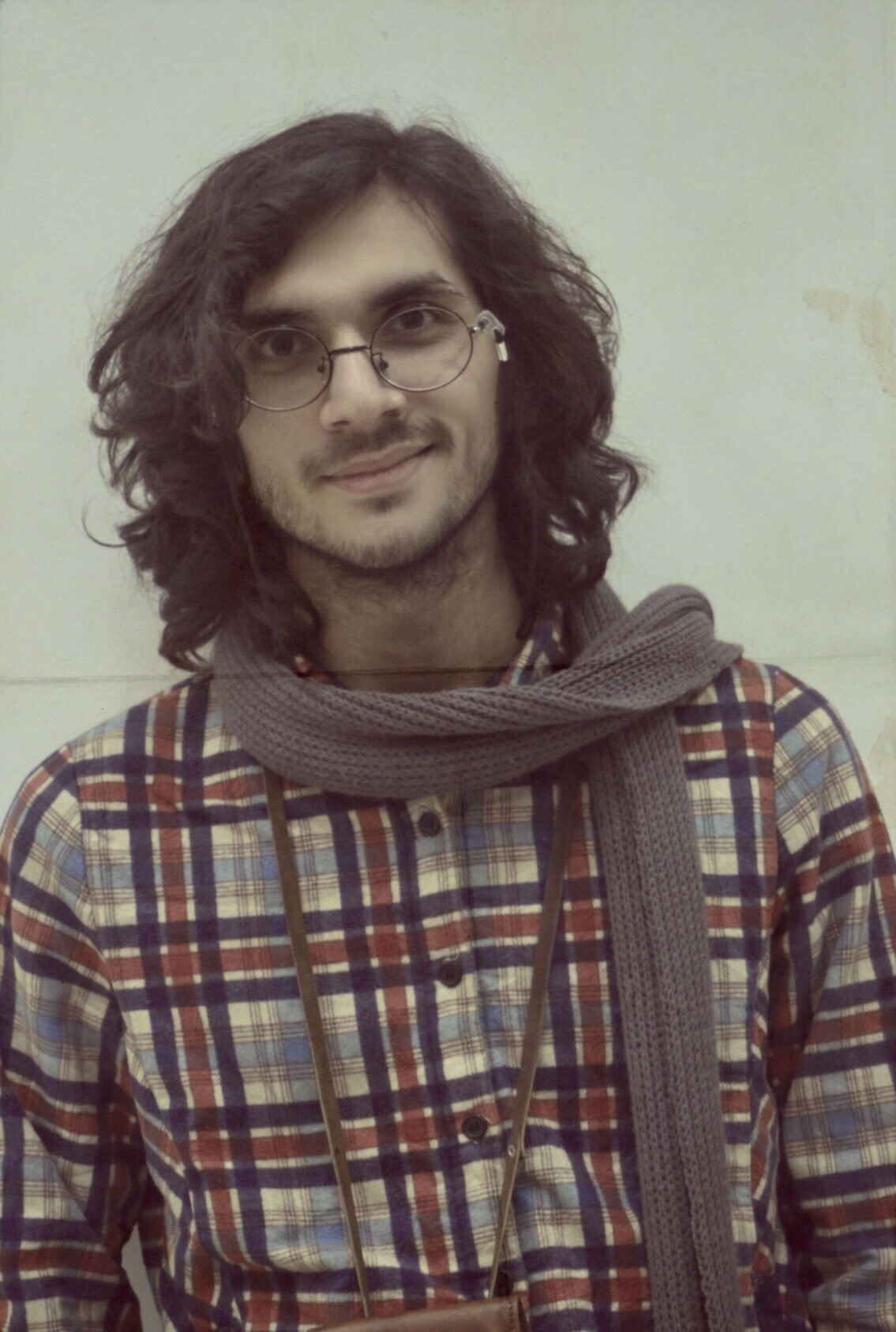
- Born: 1 June 1995 (age 31); Gorgan, Iran
- Occupations: writer; director; designer; actor
- Years active: 2005–present

Emad Rajabloo (Persian: عماد رجبلو; born on 1 June 1995) is a writer, director, designer and actor of Iranian theater and cinema and the director of "Dev Theater Group". His works have received many awards in the field of theater writing and directing. Among others, he won the writing award at the 38th Fajr International Theater Festival.

== Theatre ==
Title	post	Year	Reference
The Last Essay	Actor	2006	
The Story of the Magical City	Actor, Assistant Director	2007	
Raw Soil	Actor	2008	
Miracle	Director, actor	2009	
Watching a Painting	Director, actor	2010	
Leave in zero position	Musician	2011	
Leap over Destiny	Writer, director, actor	2011	
Hamayouni Mattress	Actor	2011	
Where Water Does Not Come Down from the Soil	Actor	2011	
Hi Dummy	Actor	2012	
The Sun Is Thirsty	Actor	2012	
Where Is Abadi	Actor	2013	
Forest Girls	Actor	2013	
The Narrow Road of Hasan and Dev Behind the Mountain	Actor, musician	2013	
Apophis	Writer, actor	2014	
Poems of a Respected Shepherd	stage designer	2014	
Razavi's Photo Gallery	Actor, stage designer	2014	
Attis and Patis	Actor, Assistant Director	2014	
Rooster...	Actor	2015	
Sugary	Designer, writer, director	2015	
Alice...	Actor	2015	
Who Is the Liar?	Designer, writer, director	2015	
Pinocchio	Designer, Writer, Director	2016	
Enemy of God	Designer, writer, director	2017	
Victim	Designer, writer, director	2019	
Maiden, Isosceles	Designer, writer, director	2019	
Code 13	Writer	2019	
Altar	Writer	2020	

== Books ==
Title	Publisher	Year	Reference
Maiden	New, Niv	2021	
Altar	Display, Namayesh	2021	

== TV series ==
Title	Post	Director	Year	Reference
There Is a Light Here Too	Writer, actor, Assistant to a director	Ehsan Rajabloo	2016	
Horn in Horn, Tourist	Writer, Stage design ، cloth design	Ehsan Rajabloo	2023	

== TV movie ==
Title "Telefilm"	Post	Director	Year	Reference
Final Exam	Actor	Noor Mohammad Najari	2006	
Home Is Here	Writer, actor, Assistant to a director	Ehsan Rajbloo	2017	

== Short film ==
Title	Post	Year	Reference
Da "Mother"	Writer	2015	
Enemy of God	Designer	2017	
Synonym	Actor	2018	
Two Weeks Later	Script consultant	2019	
Leech	Stage designer	2019	
She Is Like Me	Actor selection ، Director of actors	2020	
Lost Swan	Poster designer	2021	
Friday Noon	Stage design ، Cloth design	2021	
Closed Circuit	Writer	2021	
Before It Happens	Designer, writer, director	2022	
Golden Carpet	Poster designer	2022	

== Awards and honors ==
- 2012 – Second place for the director of the show Watching a Painting from the second edition of the play reading and etude festival.
- 2015 – Acting candidate for the play Razavi's Photo Gallery from the 23rd Surah Mah Theater Festival .
- 2015 – Second place in the play Apophis from the Young Hopes Theater Festival.
- 2016 – First place for directing the show Who Is the Liar? From the fifth theater festival of play reading and etude Afto .
- 2016 – First place in designing and conceptualizing the show Who Is the Liar? From the 5th Theater Festival of Playwriting and Etude Afto .
- 2017 – Enemy of God is the selected play of the theater festival for public performance in the city theater complex .
- 2017 – Statue of the festival and diploma of honor for directing the show Enemy of God from the second national festival of short creative theater of sacrifice .
- 2017 – Commendation for stage design of Enemy of God from the 2nd Isar Creative Short Theater Festival .
- 2017 – The first prize for writing the play Pinocchio from the 6th Theater Festival of Play Reading and Etude Afto .
- 2017 – The first place in the direction of the play Pinocchio from the 6th Theater Festival of Play Reading and Etude Afto .
- 2018 – 3rd place for directing the show Enemy of God from the 25th Surah Mah Theater Festival .
- 2018 – The selected author of the play Enemy of God of the 5th Surah Mah Theater Regional Festival .
- 2018 – Chosen director of the show Enemy of God from the 5th Surah Mah Theater Regional Festival .
- 2018 – The play Enemy of God selected by the regional festival was entered into the national Surah Mah festival .
- 2018 – Statue of the joint script with Ehsan Rajablo for the script There Is a Light Here Too from the 20th Broadcasting Centers Festival .
- 2019 – The play Enemy of God chosen by the 29th theater festival of Golestan province entered the Fajr International Theater Festival .
- 2019 – The third place for writing the play Enemy of God from the 29th theater festival of Golestan province .
- 2019 – 2nd place for directing the show Enemy of God from the 29th theater festival of Golestan province .
- 2020 – Appreciation for the show Metsawi al-Sakin from the 38th Fajr International Theater Festival .
- 2020 – Nominee for director, stage and costume design of Isosceles show from the 38th Fajr International Theater Festival .
- 2020 – Isosceles show selected for the 30th theater festival of Golestan province and qualified for the Fajr International Theater Festival . Emadeddin rajablou
- 2020 – The first place for writing Isosceles play from the 30th theater festival of Golestan province .
- 2020 – Second place for directing the play Isosceles from the 30th theater festival of Golestan province .
- 2022 – A statue with an honorary diploma of the first author of the play Altar from the 33rd Hormozgan Theater Festival .
- 2022 – Certificate of appreciation for the selected show Enemy of God from the 16th Mehr Kashan Theater Festival .
- 2023 – Nominee for the best technical achievement, set designer/ for the play Isosceles from the first period of Hafez Statue Theater Festival/Ali Moalem Award . Emadeddin rajabloo
- 2023 – Appreciation for writing the play Altar from the second Namvar Playwriting Festival .
