= Maryam Zandi =

Iranian photographer and author

- مریم زندی
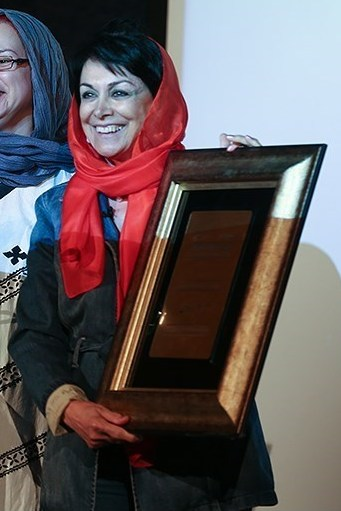
- Born: 1946 (age 79–80); Gorgan, Iran
- Education: University of Tehran
- Known for: Photographer, author
- Relatives: Nader Ebrahimi (half-brother)

Maryam Zandi (born 1946 in Gorgan, Iran; Persian: مریم زندی) is an Iranian documentary photographer and author. She is best known for her photographs during the Iranian Revolution.

== Biography ==
Zandi spent her school years in Gorgan and then graduated from the University of Tehran in the School of Law & Political Sciences. Beginning her photography career in 1970, she was awarded the first prize of the Ministry of Art and Culture's national photography competition. In 1972 she joined National Iranian Radio and Television (NIRT) as a photographer and later by initial publications of Tamasha magazine, she became National Television and Tamasha magazine's public relations photographer.

Zandi remained with National Television for the next twelve years. During this time, she also began taking photographs of the revolution in 1979, as well as other subjects. Her first significant photography project ("Chehreh-ha: Portraits") was begun after the revolution (1981), which remained incomplete by the beginning of the Iran–Iraq War and her trip to France (1986–1989).

However her first photography book (Turkmen & Sahra: Turkmen & Desert) was published in 1982. It portrays Turkmens of Iran, using photographs to study this Iranian ethnic group. Her university thesis is also sociological research about Turkmens of Iran.

After returning to Iran in 1989, work on the incomplete project ("Chehreh-ha": Portraits) was resumed. This work is still ongoing and after 26 years is a photographic archive of famous and influential contemporary Iranians (as well as some non-Iranians) in the fields of literature, visual arts, cinema, theatre, architecture, music and politics. Zandi has published more than ten photography books.

Her last publication is the 1979 Revolution photography book which is a collection of incidents happening around the time of the Iranian revolution in 1979.

Since 2000, Zandi's photographs in collaboration with Ebrahim Haghighi (graphic designer) have designed and published more than 80 different types of artistic calendars containing photographs related to Iran.

In 2005 Zandi along with twelve other Iranian photographers were selected by the Society of Iranian Photographers to establish the National Iranian Photographers' Society (NIPS). In 2009 by the first meeting of the board of directors, Zandi—achieving the highest vote—was elected as the first chairman of the board. She resigned from NIPS in 2013.

In 2010 she was invited to receive the "first degree medal of art" from the president, however she refused the medal in protest to lack of freedom and professional dignity of photographers in Iran at the time. The same year, she received an independent award as the most influential photographer of the year in the "Social Documentary Photography Festival" for supporting the rights of Iranian photographers ("Sheed Award"). In 2014 she won the same prize again, for publishing the book 1979 Revolution.

Zandi has also designed and made glass-works. She has held three exhibitions portraying her glass art.

== Publications ==
- Turkman and the desert. Tehran, 1983.
- The portraits of the book,'Stories from Iran. Washington DC: Mage, 1991. Black and white.
- Portraits (1) A Portfolio of Iranian Literati. Tehran, 1993.
- Portraits (2) A Portfolio of Iranian Artists. Tehran, 1995.
- Portraits (3) A Portfolio of Iranian Film and Theater Celebrities Tehran, 1997. Black and white.
- Akkashi (PotoPaints) with E.Haghighi. Tehran: Haft Rang, 2001.
- Portraits (4) A Portfolio of Iranian Literati Vol. 2. Tehran: Haft Rang, 2004.
- Iran! my beloved flower!. Tehran: Nazar, 2006. Color.
- Portraits of The Book of Iranian Architects. Nazar and Iran Architectural Pride worthies Foundation, 2007.
- Blue with Red line. Color. Tehran: Nazar, 2008.
- The Revolution of IRAN 79. Tehran: Nazar, 2014. Photographs. Black and white.
- Portraits (5) A Portfolio of Iranian Musicians. Self-published, Tehran, 2017. Black and white.
- ... I Feel Sorry for Mr. Dugger. Poems by Zandi. Self-published, Tehran, 2018.
- My Hair in the Wind. Photographs. Tehran: Nazar, 2019. Black and white.
- The Government of 80. Photographs. Tehran: Nazar, 2019. Black and white.

== Solo exhibitions ==
- 1978 Woman in step with the Revolution, Ministry of Labor and Bagh-e Ferdows, Tehran.
- 1979 Form and Tradition in Turkman-Sahra, color, Negarestan Museum, Tehran.
- 1991 Portrits from the Iranian Literati Scene, Hilton Hotel, Washington D.C.
- 1992 Portrits from the Iranian Literati Scene, George Washington University, Washington D.C.
- 1993 Portraits of Contemporary Iranian Artists, Barg Art Gallery, Tehran.
- 2011 The Gifts of the earth, Gallery No 6 Tehran
- 2012 The Crows, Golestan Gallery, Tehran
- 2013 Glass works, Golestan Gallery, Tehran
