= Golestan province =

Province of Iran

Golestan Province استان گلستان (Persian)
- Province
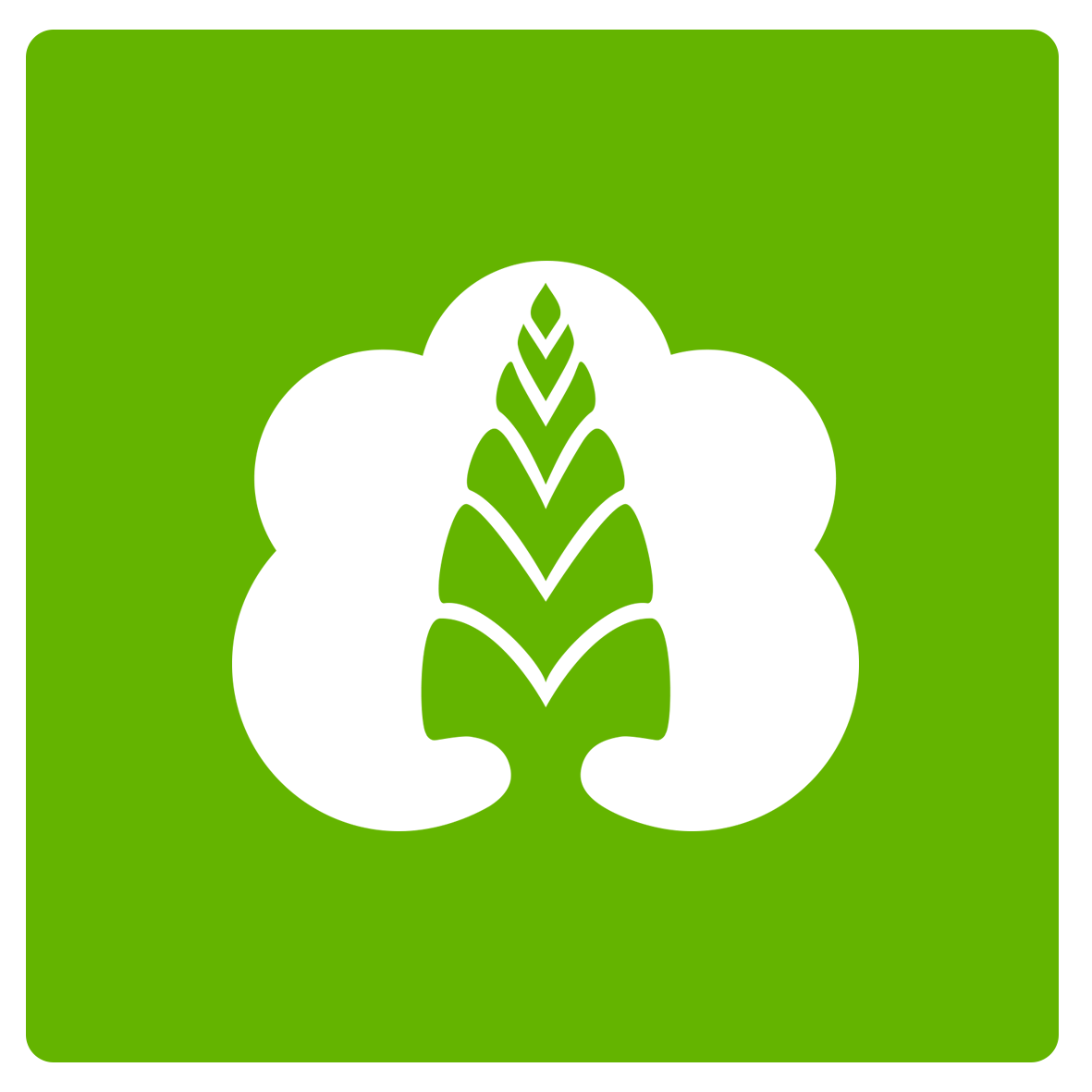
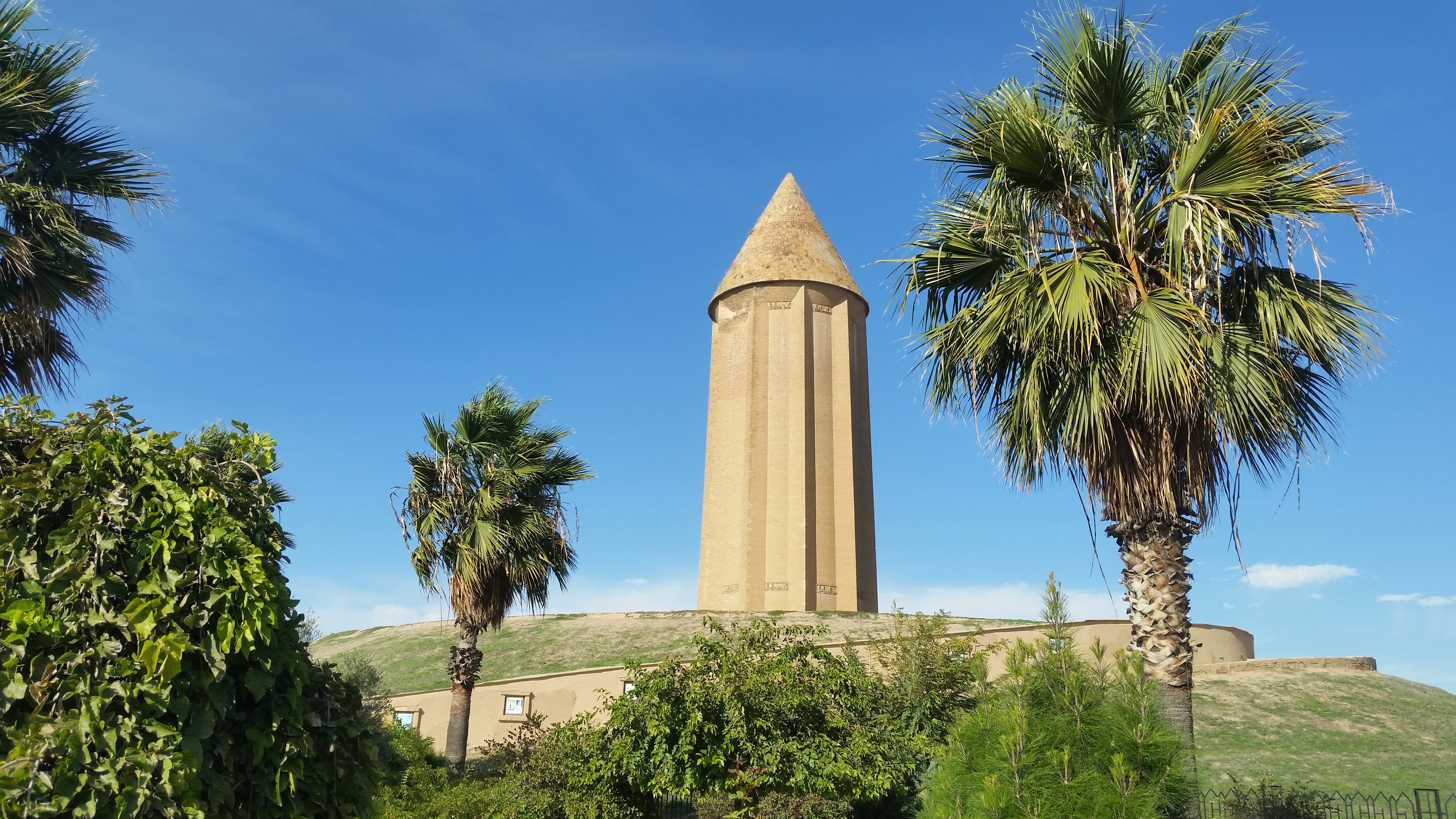
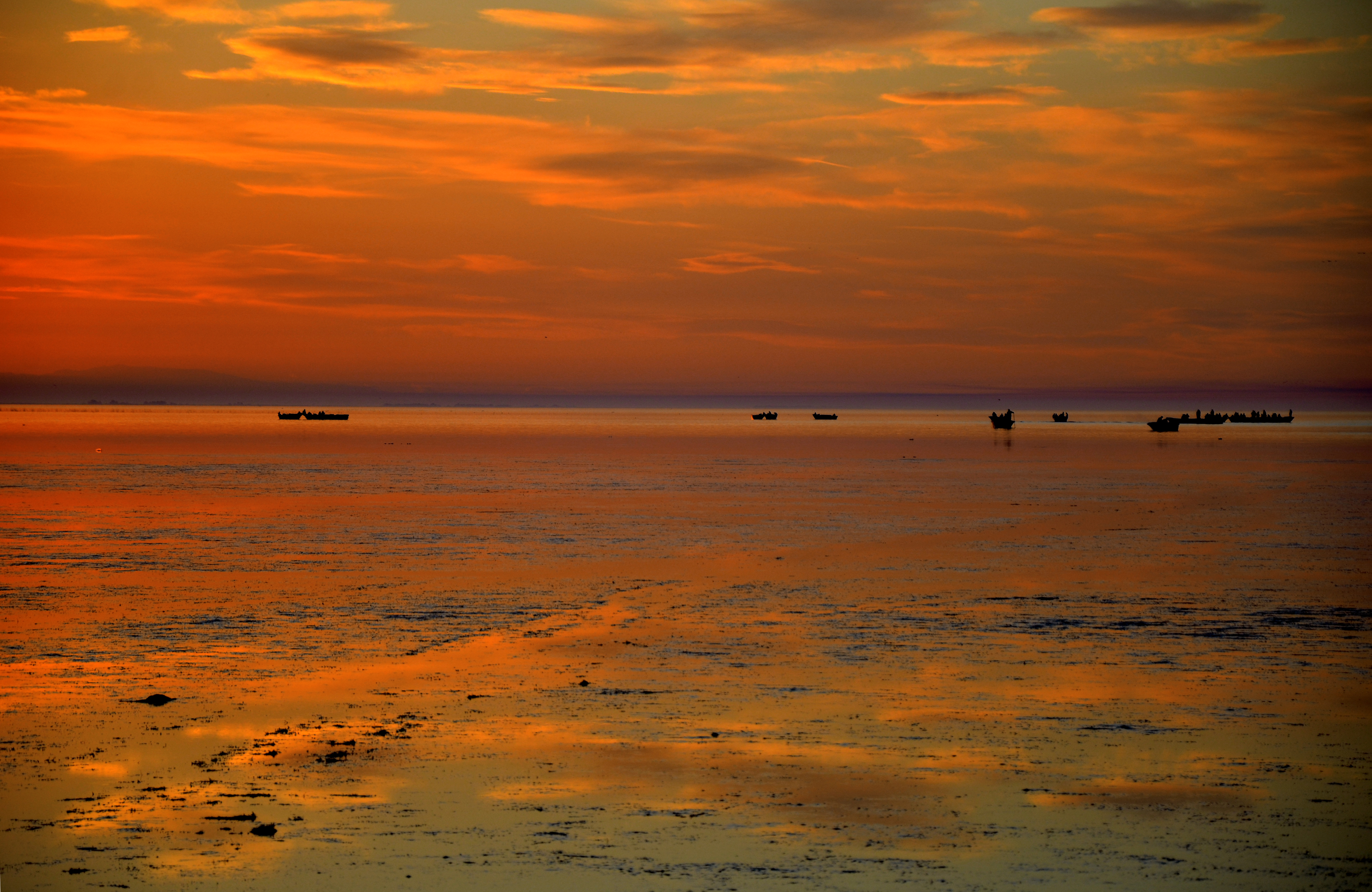
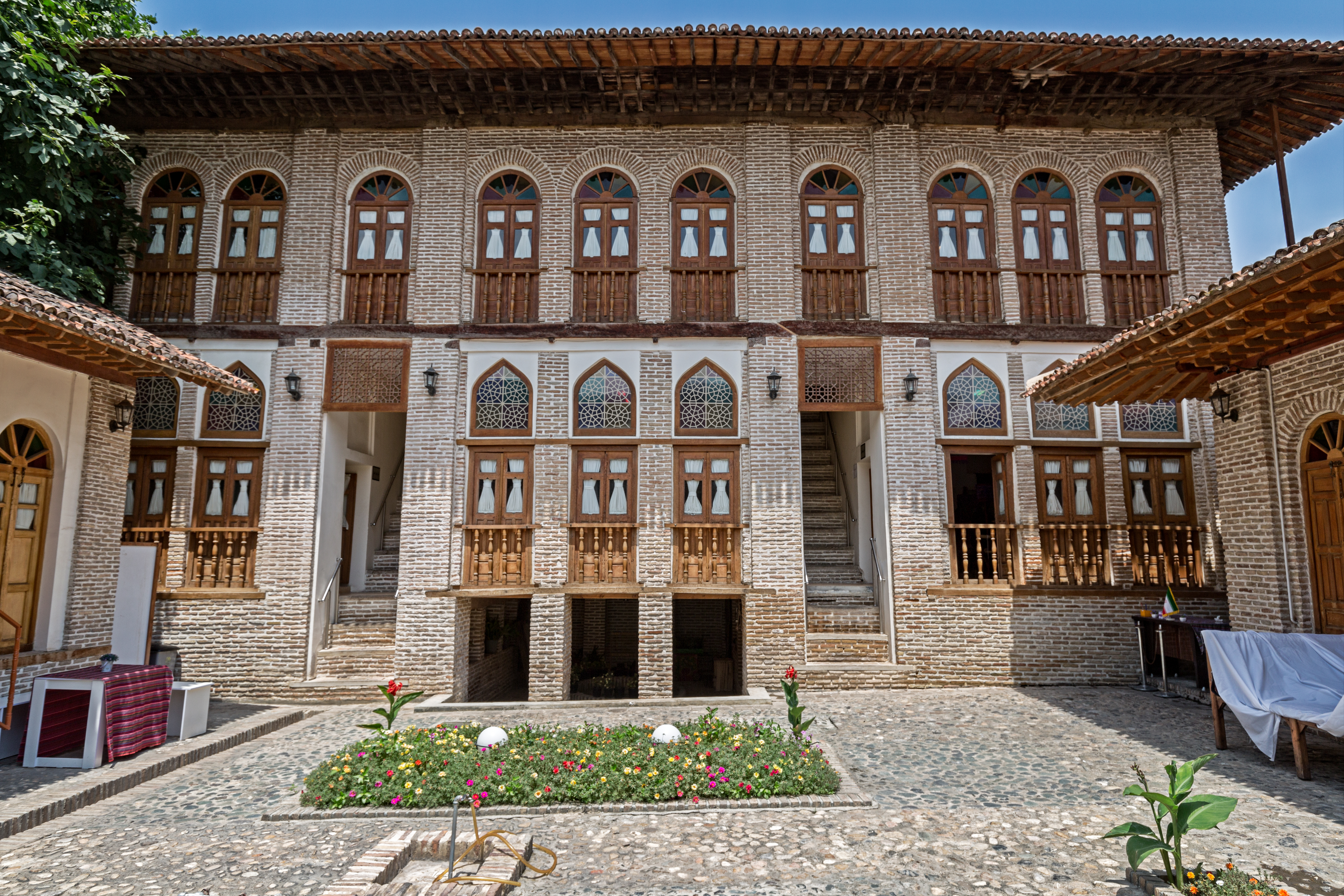
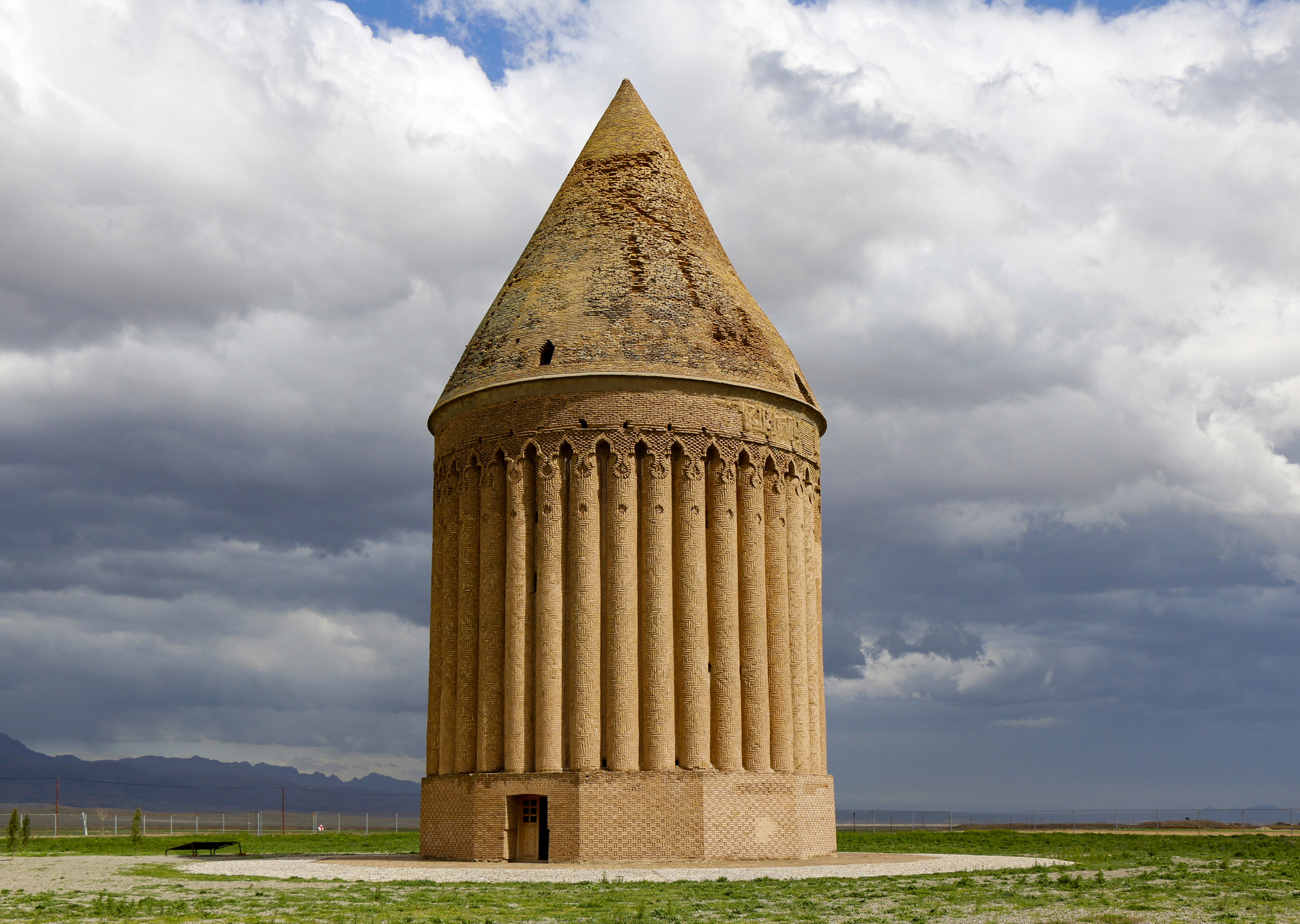
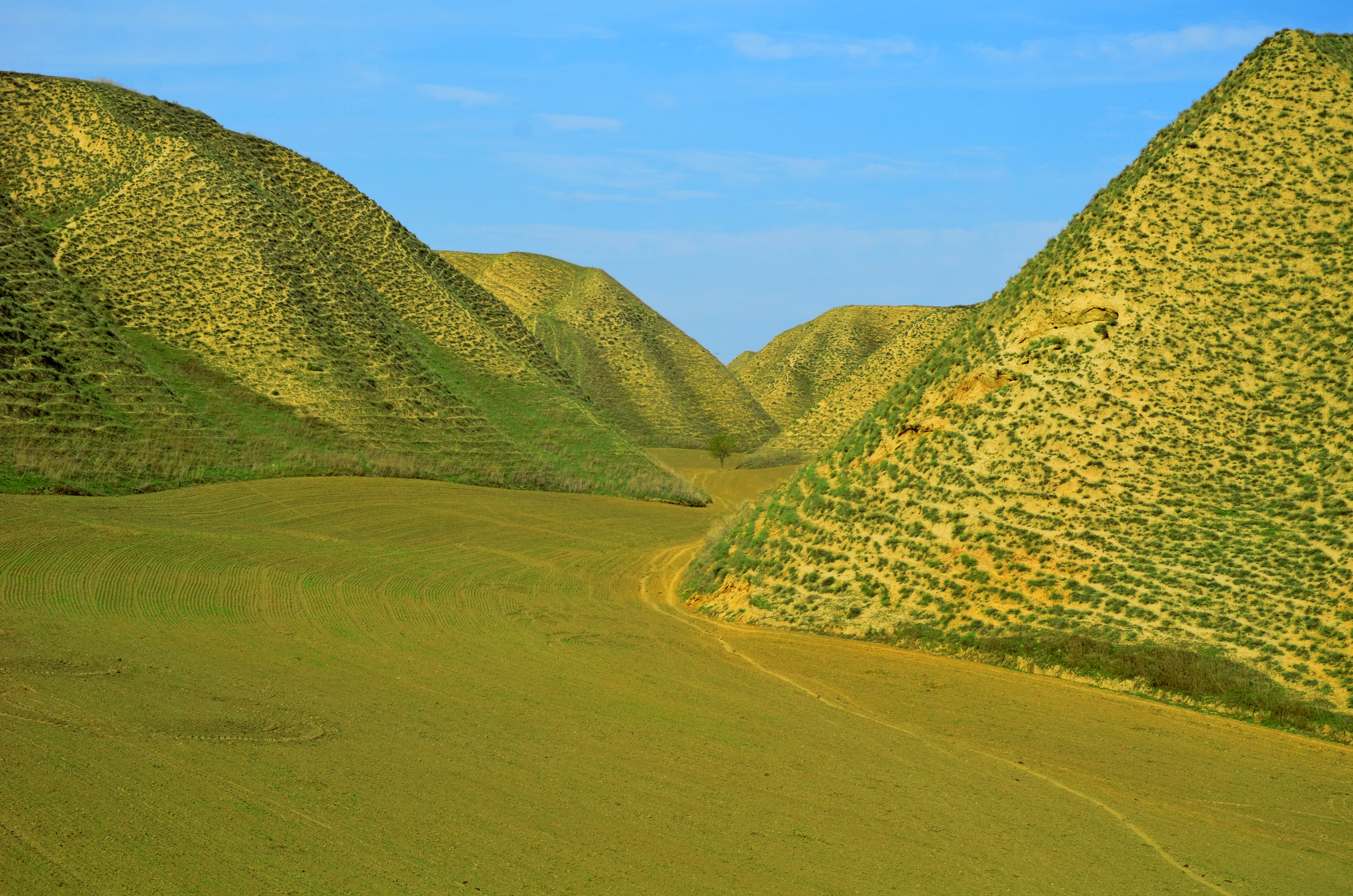
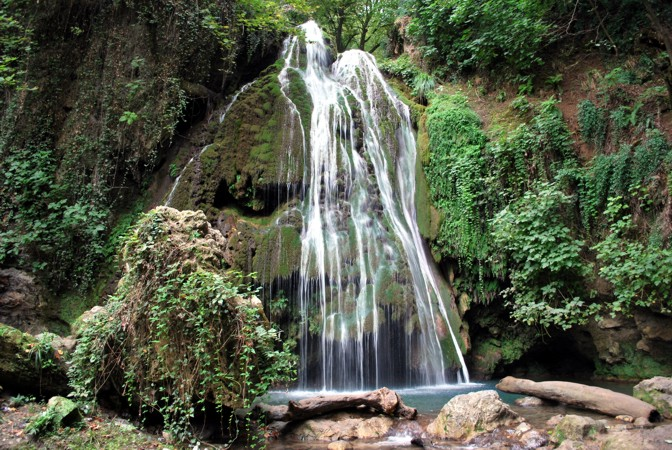
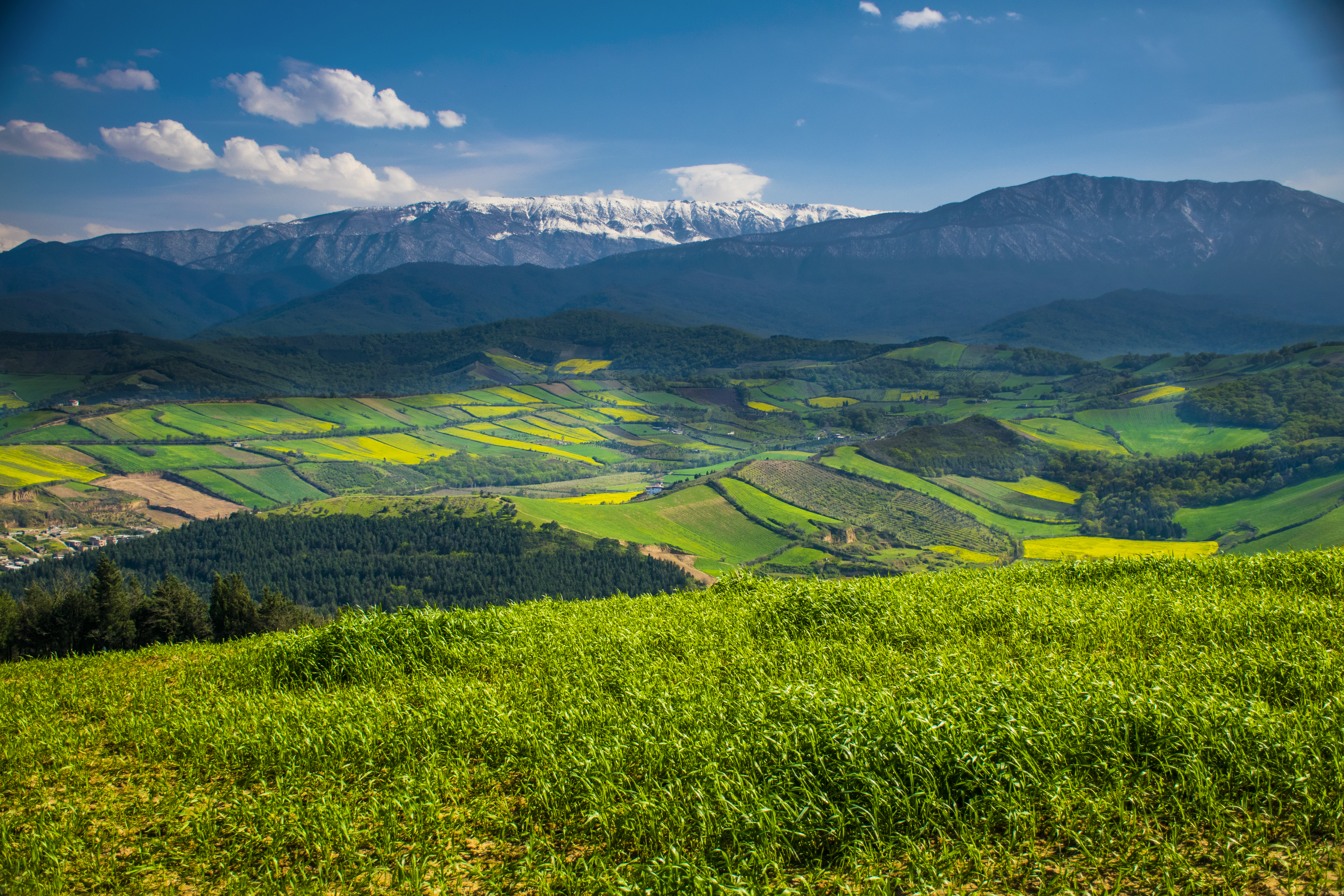
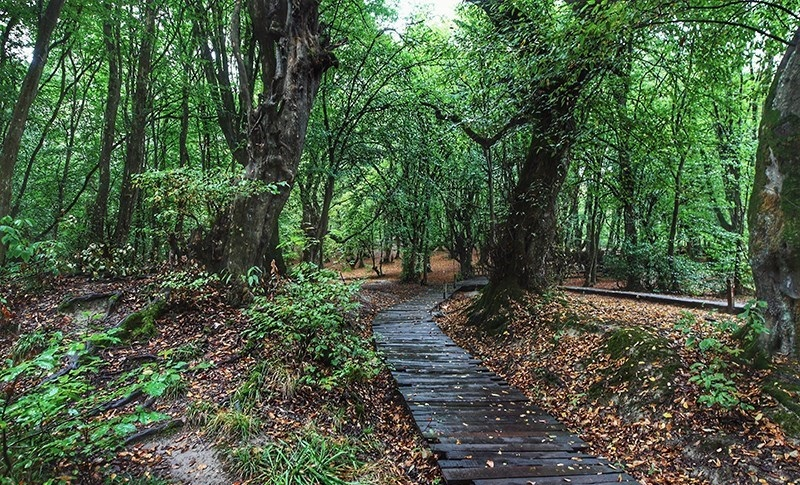

- Location of Golestan province within Iran
- Coordinates: 37°20′N 55°09′E
- Country: Iran
- Region: Region 1
- Established: 1997
- Capital: Gorgan
- Counties: 14

Government
  - Governor-general: Ali-Asghar Tahmasbi (Independent)

Area
  - Total: 20,367 km^{2} (7,864 sq mi)

Population (2016)
  - Total: 1,868,819
  - Density: 91.757/km^{2} (237.65/sq mi)
- Time zone: UTC+03:30 (IRST)
- Area code: 017
- Main language(s): Persian, Mazandarani, Turkmen
- HDI (2017): 0.778 high · 20th
- Website: http://golestanp.ir/

Golestan province (Note: Persian: استان گلستان, romanized: Ostân-e Golestân) is one of the 31 provinces of Iran, located in the northeast of the country and southeast of the Caspian Sea. Its capital is the city of Gorgan, formerly called Esterabad until 1937. Golestan was split off from Mazandaran Province in 1997.

Golestan province borders Turkmenistan to the north. One of the key border points between the two countries is Incheh Borun, which serves as a vital crossing point.

The province was made a part of Region 1 upon the division of the provinces into 5 regions, solely for coordination and development purposes, on 22 June 2014. The majority of its population are Shia Muslims.

== Etymology ==
Gulistan, Golestan, or Golastan translates to "gul-" meaning "flower" and "-stan" meaning "land" or "region." Golestan, therefore, literally means "land of flowers" in Iranian languages (e.g., Persian, Kurdish, and Mazandarani). This is a common toponym in countries with Persian linguistic roots (see Gulistan).

The capital of Gorgan derives its name from a wider region known historically as Gorgân (گرگان), Middle Persian Gurgān, and Old Persian Varkāna (in the Behistun Inscription) meaning "land of wolves". This is also the root of the Ancient Greek Ὑρκανία (Hyrkanía) and Latin Hyrcania. Wild wolves are still found in the province.

== History ==
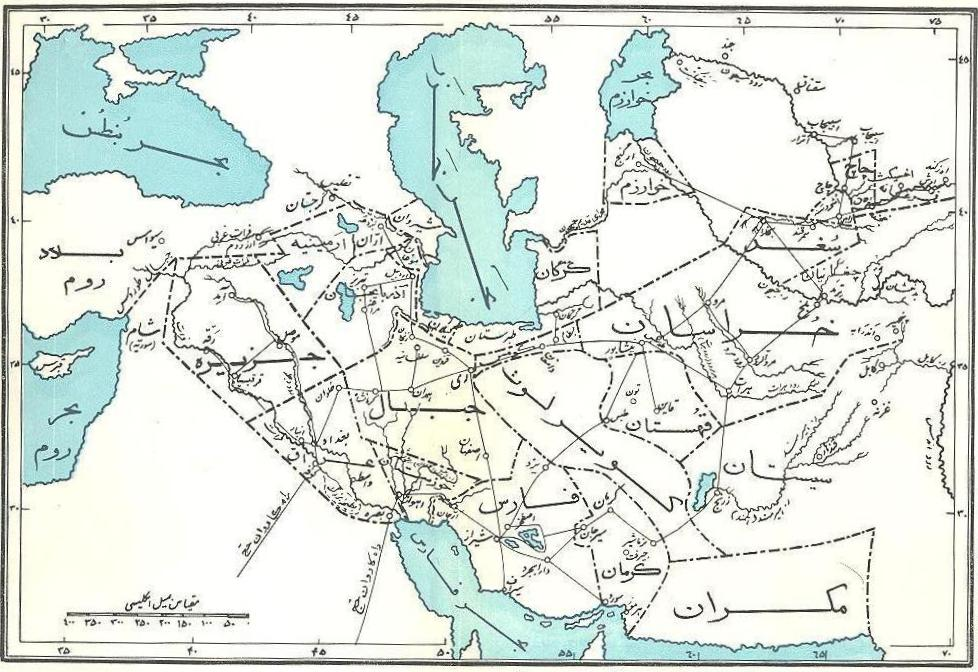
Map of the Abbasid Caliphate showing Gorgan province, forerunner to modern-day Golestan province

Human settlements in this area date back to 10,000 BC. Evidence of the ancient city of Jorjan can still be seen near the current city of Gonbad-e Kavus. It was an important city of Persia located on the Silk Road.

Under Achaemenid Iran, it seems to have been administered as a sub-province of Parthia and is not named separately in the provincial lists of Darius and Xerxes. The Hyrcanians, however, under the leadership of Megapanus, are mentioned by Herodotus in his list of Xerxes' army during the invasion of Greece.

== Demographics ==
=== Language and ethnicity ===
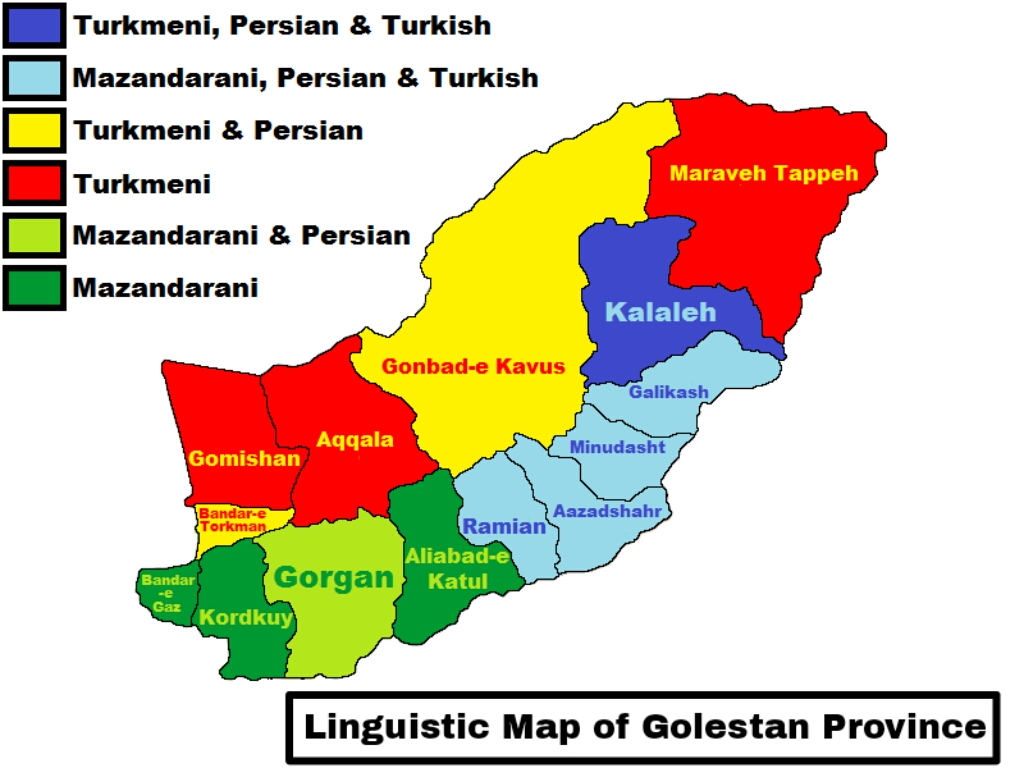
Linguistic Map of Golestan province

In 2006, the Ministry of Education of Iran estimated the ethnic breakdown of the province to be:

- Turkmens: 34.20%
- Mazandaranis: 30.40%
- Sistanis & Persians: 14.90%
- Baluchis: 10.90%
- Armaegianans: 7.30%
- Others (including Azeris, Kazakhs, Kurds, Armenians and Georgians): 2.3%

The Mazandaranis who inhabit the foothills to Shah Pasand were subsumed under the rubric "Persian" by these official statistics.

The Persians/Mazandaranis are considered by nearly all inhabitants of the province to be "the old natives" while all others are considered ethnic immigrants in the past.

Most Mazandaranis live in Gorgan, Ali Abad, Kordkuy, Bandar-e Gaz and Gonbad-e Kavus. They speak Mazanderani language.

The Turkmens reside in the north of the province, a plain called Turkmen Sahra. Since the 15th century, these formerly nomadic people have lived in this area, the main cities of which are Gonbad-e Kavus and Bandar Torkaman. Turkmens are Sunni Muslim. They form a sizable minority in cities such as Gorgan, Ali Abad, Kalaleh, and many eastern townships.

Azeris and the Qizilbash predate the Turkmen by centuries and have in time become completely Shia, and therefore, culturally associated with the Persians and other Shias.

The Sistani Persians and the Baluch are relatively recent arrivals and date back to the early 20th century. They are still arriving in the area in some numbers due to the lasting drought in their home areas of Sistan.

The people of Kordkuy are originally from the Kurdish areas of west Iran, Kermanshah and Kurdistan provinces. They belong to the Kord-rostami tribe and are also found in significant numbers in other cities like Gorgan and Bandare Gaz. Subtribes of the Kord-Rostami tribe are the Aghili and Sepanlou tribes. Moreover, the city of Maraveh Tappeh has a mixed population of Sunni Turkmens and Shia Kurds.

Other ethnic groups such as Kazakhs, Khorasani Kurds, Georgians, and Armenians also reside in this area, and have preserved their traditions and rituals.

A small minority of followers of the Baháʼí faith also live in Golestan (in Shahpasand).

=== Population ===
At the time of the 2006 National Census, the province's population was 1,593,055 in 379,354 households. The following census in 2011 showed an increase in population to 1,777,014 in 482,842 households. The 2016 census measured the population of the province as 1,868,819 in 550,249 households.

=== Administrative divisions ===

The population history and structural changes of Golestan province's administrative divisions over three consecutive censuses are shown in the following table.

Golestan Province
Counties	2006	2011	2016
Aliabad-e Katul (Note: Formerly Aliabad County)	123,923	132,757	140,709
Aqqala	109,440	124,185	132,733
Azadshahr	88,251	91,767	96,803
Bandar-e Gaz	46,179	46,315	46,130
Galikash (Note: Separated from Minudasht County)	—	59,975	63,173
Gomishan (Note: Separated from Torkaman County)	—	63,447	68,773
Gonbad-e Kavus	283,331	325,789	348,744
Gorgan	393,887	462,455	480,541
Kalaleh	149,857	110,473	117,319
Kordkuy	67,427	70,244	71,270
Maraveh Tappeh (Note: Separated from Kalaleh County)	—	55,821	60,953
Minudasht	126,676	75,659	75,483
Ramian	81,866	85,324	86,210
Torkaman	122,218	72,803	79,978
Total	1,593,055	1,777,014	1,868,819

=== Cities ===
According to the 2016 census, 1,015,774 people (over 54% of the population of Golestan province) live in the following cities:

City	Population
Aliabad-e Katul	52,838
Anbar Olum	7,003
Aqqala	35,116
Azadshahr	43,760
Bandar Torkaman	53,970
Bandar-e Gaz	20,742
Daland	20,754
Faraghi	5,777
Fazelabad	19,461
Galikash	23,394
Gomishan	19,191
Gonbad-e Kavus	151,910
Gorgan	350,676
Incheh Borun	2,494
Jelin	7,417
Kalaleh	36,176
Khan Bebin	10,878
Kordkuy	39,881
Maraveh Tappeh	8,671
Mazraeh	4,009
Minudasht	30,085
Neginshahr	8,138
Now Deh Khanduz	2,989
Now Kandeh	6,650
Ramian	12,426
Sangdevin	4,203
Sarkhon Kalateh	7,589
Siminshahr	17,205
Tatar-e Olya	4,782

== Culture ==
The world's tallest brick structure of its kind, the Gonbad-e Qabus tower, stands in this province.

== Climate and geography ==
Golestan enjoys mild weather and a temperate climate most of the year. Geographically, it is divided into two sections: The plains, and the mountains of the Alborz range. In the eastern Alborz section, the direction of the mountains faces northeast and gradually decreases in height. The highest point of the province is Shavar, with a height of 3,945 meters. Two of the main rivers are the Gharasu and Gorganrud.

=== Golestan National Park ===
Golestan National Park in northern Iran is faced with the construction of a road through the forest, allegedly for the ease of traffic for the villagers and woodmen but at the expense of losing the only national park in Iran throughout which a range of different climates (humidity near the Caspian Sea and desert farther south) is spread.

Golestan National Park is Iran's biggest national park which spans three provinces, Golestan, Mazandaran, and North Khorasan. Surprisingly, the authorities ignore repeated calls by experts to construct such roads around, instead of through, the forests, which in this way would no longer threaten animal and plant life.

The park has a significant biodiversity. Its fauna includes wild deer, bears, and small deer. However, with the exception of wild boars, the ungulate population has declined by 68–89% between 1970–1978 and 2011–2014 due to poaching, according to a study published in 2017. The park covers 5% of Iran's forests, and at least 1,362 plant species have been recorded there. The western forest zone, which is typical of the Hyrcanian mountain range, is home to numerous broad-leaved trees - including remnant species such as oak and maple - while the eastern steppe zone is mainly composed of evergreen shrubs such as juniper and artemisia.

== Colleges and universities ==
- Golestan University
- Golestan University of Medical Sciences
- Gonbad Kavous University
- Gorgan University of Agricultural Sciences and Natural Resources
- Islamic Azad University of Azadshahr
- Islamic Azad University of Gorgan
- Islamic Azad University of Ali Abad katool
