= Gorganrud River =

Gorganrud
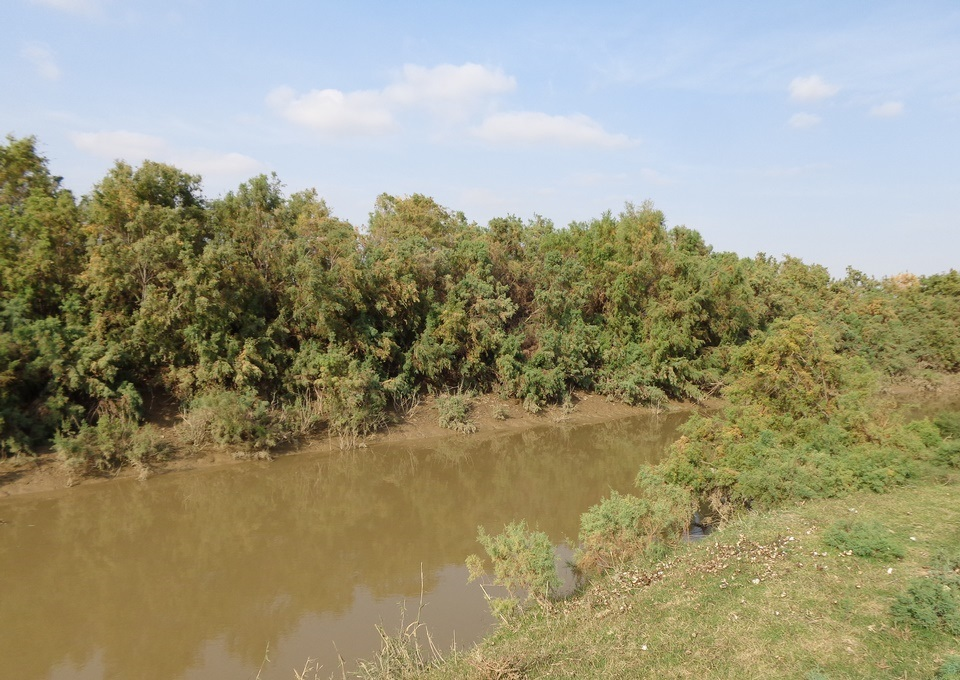
- Gorganrud River at Bibi Shirvan village

- Native name: گرگان‌رود (Persian)

Location
- Country: Iran

Physical characteristics
- Source
  - coordinates: 37°29′34″N 55°30′42″E
- Mouth
  - location: Caspian Sea
- Length: 251 kilometres (156 mi)

Gorganrud is a river in northeastern Iran. It begins in Mount Aladagh, located in the North Khorasan Province. Flowing through the Golestan Province, it ends at the Caspian Sea.

The condition of the Gorganrud estuary is of concern, partly as a result of upstream water use, including several dams, such as the Voshmgir, Golestan and Bostan.

Flash flooding occurred in 2001, with 300 fatalities, notably in the Madarsoo subcatchment upstream from Golestan Dam, including in Golestan National Park.

== Course ==
The largest settlement located by Gorganrud river is the city of Gonbad-e Kavus, the river passes the city from its north and west. Gorganrud also passes through the center of Aqqala, with 3 bridges connecting the northern and southern parts of the city by crossing the river.
