= Nader Ebrahimi =

Iranian writer and film director

- Native name: نادر ابراهیمی
- Born: April 3, 1936 Tehran, Iran
- Died: June 5, 2008 (aged 72) Tehran, Iran
- Resting place: Behesht Zahra
- Occupation: writer; journalist; filmmaker; songwriter; translator
- Years active: 1961–2008
- Spouse: Farzaneh Mansouri
- Children: 3
- Relatives: Maryam Zandi (half-sister)

Website
- naderebrahimi.com

Nader Ebrahimi (April 3, 1936 – June 5, 2008; Persian: نادر ابراهیمی) was an Iranian writer, screenwriter, photographer, director, actor, songwriter and novelist.

Son to Ata-ol-molk Ebrahimi, who was a descendant of a famous family from Kerman, Nader earned his diploma in Persian literature, and then received his BA in English literature. He was also affiliated with political activities, which resulted in periods of imprisonment. He worked in various jobs, including teaching and banking. He directed some TV series and documentaries, such as The Sound of the Desert but he's best known as a novelist, for Three Looks at the man coming from, Forty Letters to my wife, A Man in everlasting banishment, and Fire without smoke. He also directed Hami and Kami on Long Journeys to Their Homeland, a television series that aired on Iranian state television prior to the Islamic Revolution's victory in 1979.

== Life ==
Nader Ebrahimi was born in 1936 in Tehran. After finishing his high school in Tehran, he enrolled in law school, but withdrew after two years, to achieve his BA in English language and literature. Ebrahimi was married to Farzaneh Mansouri who was introduced to him through her relatives, and after a brief acquaintance, the two agreed to marry. My acquaintance with Nader happened at a family function, Farzaneh Mansouri stated in one of her interviews about her meeting with him.

At the age of thirteen, he became a member of a political organization and served time in prison. Ibn Mashghala's and Abu al-two Mashhaghal's books contain a detailed account of his life and deeds, written in his own language. He goes into greater detail regarding his actions in these two books. Ebrahimi tried various jobs. During his lifetime he has been a repairman in the desert, a printery worker, a bank accountant, a magazine layout designer, a translator and editor, a documentary and movie maker, a bookseller, a calligrapher, a painter, a university lecturer, and a writer.

In addition to politics, Nader Ebrahimi was a sports figure. He formed Abarmard, one of the earliest climbing groups. It influenced the development of mountaineering and mountaineering ethics as well.

In 1984 he was initiated as Freemason in the Italian Federation of the International Masonic Order for Men and Women Le Droit Humain, in the "Ugo Bassi" Lodge n.1143 in the city of Bologna.

== Writing career ==
He began writing at age 16 and never gave it up. His first book A House for Night was a big success. In addition to hundreds of scholarly articles, he has published more than 100 books. He also wrote and directed several movies, documentaries, and two well-made and popular television series. He had written over a hundred publications by 2001, including long and short stories, children's books, plays, screenplays, and studies on numerous subjects, in addition to hundreds of study and critique articles. Several of his writings have also been translated into several languages around the world.

Nader Ebrahimi and his wife started their careers in children's literature at the same time they founded the Institute for Children and Adolescents. The Asian and World Children's Book Illustration Festivals are named Hamgam Asia Publisher of Choice and World Publisher of Choice. Ebrahimi has won numerous prizes, including the first Bratislava Prize for Children's Literature, the first UNESCO Education Prize, the Iranian Book of the Year Award, and others. Nader Ebrahimi taught screenwriting and playwriting in his classes. Among his students, Ebrahim Hatami Kia – Kamal Tabrizi – Hojjat Baqaee are mentioned more than him.

== Recognition and awards ==
The author has a library and museum dedicated to him in Tehran's House of Poetry and Literature in 2020. The library has 5,000 books, all of which were donated by Ebrahimi's family from his personal collection. The museum has shown a collection of his unique things, including prizes, notebooks, and mountaineering equipment.

His other recognitions and awards include:

- He was awarded Bratislava first prize (1970), UNESCO prize for education, Iran's Book of the Year prize (1970), and several other awards.
- UNESCO Education Prize.
- He also won the Chosen Author of Fiction title in Twenty Years after the Revolution.
- He was granted the title of The best fiction writer in 20 years after the revolution for the novel Fire without Smoke. His work has been translated into several languages.
- Hamgam Institute for children's literature received The Best Publisher in Asia and The Best Publisher of the World award from Asian and worldwide festivals of children's books illustration.
- Bratislava Prize for Children's Literature
- Nader Ebrahimi was also among those selected for the Imam Mehrbani award in 2009 after his death.

== Works ==
- Ebrahimi, Nader (2018). A quiet romance. Rozbahan. p. 239.
- Ebrahimi, Nader (2007). A'tash Bedoone Dood. "Fire Without Smoke". Roozbehan. p. 2260. ISBN 978-9-645-52929-9.
- Sedaye Sahra (The Sound of the Desert)
- Aan ke khial baft, aan ke amal kard (The One Who Dreamed, the One Who Acted)
- Ibn Mashgaleh (the son of jobs), first published 1345, Roozbehan Publisher, Ebrahimi's autobiography, the first volume
- Abu al-mashagel( the father of jobs), first published 1365, Roozbehan Publisher, Ebrahimi's autobiography, the second volume
- Mardi dar tabeed abadi(a man in ever -lasting banishment)
- bar jade haye abi sorkh (on blue red roads)
- Ebrahimi, Nader (2017). Forty short letters to my wife. CreateSpace Independent Publishing Platform. p. 118. ISBN 978-1-978-36419-6.

== Death ==
After a long battle with Alzheimer's disease, Nader Ebrahimi died on the afternoon of June 5, 2008, at the age of 72.
