= Golestan University of Medical Sciences =

- Gorgan University of Medical Sciences
- Motto in English: With participation, empathy, and collective wisdom, we strive for the health of our beloved Iran.
- Type: public
- Chancellor: Dr Mohsen Ebrahimi
- Academic staff: 370
- Students: 3748
- Location: Gorgan, Golestan, Iran
- Campus: Urban
- Language: Persian, English
- Website: goums.ac.ir

Golestan University of Medical Sciences (GOUMS) (Persian: دانشگاه علوم پزشکی و خدمات بهداشتی درمانی گلستان) is located in Gorgan, northeastern Iran, south of the Caspian Sea. The university was first established in 1967 and consists of seven major faculties: Medicine, Dentistry, Public Health, New Technologies in Medical Sciences, Paramedicine, Nursing and Midwifery, and the Center for Medical Education Studies and Development.

The International Campus Branch of Golestan University of Medical Sciences began its educational activities in August 2013 and accepts Iranian and non-Iranian students.

This university has 7 vice-chancellors including development and management, education, student culture, treatment, health, food and medicine, and vice-chancellor for research and technology, and 55 educational groups.

This university has 22 research centers including gastroenterology and liver, infectious diseases, health management and social development, nursing research center, dentistry, clinical research development of Sayyad Shirazi Hospital, congenital anomalies, support for clinical research development of 5 Azar, stem cells, environmental health, rheumatology, cancer research, ischemic, metabolic, psychiatry, children, health of food and pharmaceutical products and supplements, cellular and molecular, neuroscience, laboratory sciences, reproductive health and counseling in midwifery, student research committee, as well as 2 research centers entitled biomedicine and clinical sciences of Jorjani.

Golestan University of Medical Sciences has 19 teaching hospitals including 5 Azar Hospital of Gorgan, Taleghani Hospital of Gorgan, Sayyad Shirazi Hospital of Gorgan, Deziani Specialized and Super-Specialized Clinic of Gorgan, Shohada Bandargaz Hospital, Imam Khomeini Hospital of Bandarturkman, Amiralmomenin Hospital of Kordkoy, Imam Reza Khan Hospital of Babbin, Alavi Maraveh Tappe Hospital, Prophet Azam Gonbad Hospital, Al Jalil Hospital of Aq Qala, Shahid Motahari Gonbad Hospital, Baqiyatullah Al Azam Hospital, Taleghani Gonbad Hospital, Shohada Gonbad Hospital, Hazrat Masoumeh Azadshahr Hospital, Fatemeh Zahra Mitodasht Hospital, Hazrat Rasool Akram Kalaleh Hospital, and affiliated Iranian and Complementary Medicine Health Centers.

The university has 14 health centers in different cities of the province including Ramian Health Center, Gomishan, Bandargaz, Gorgan, Gonbadkavous, Galikesh, Minudasht, Kalaleh, Bandarturkman, Kordkoy, Azadshahr, Ali Abad, Maraveh Tappe and Aq Qala.

Golestan University of Medical Sciences has 6 journals, 2 of which are indexed in Scopus.

Jorjani Biomedicine Journal – Medical Laboratory Journal – Journal of Clinical and Basic Research – Journal of Research Development in Nursing & Midwifery(Scopus) – International Journal of healthcare and Management and Development – Journal of Gorgan University of medical Science (Scopus)

The university is conducting the largest cohort project in the Middle East (Golestan Cohort Study) in collaboration with internationally renowned scientists. Since Golestan province is a high-risk region for upper gastrointestinal cancers, promoting cancer research has been considered a priority by the medical research community and policymakers. For this purpose, the Golestan Cancer Biobank (GoCB) was established in 2016 to provide biological samples and data related to cancer patients by applying international standards and supporting high-quality cancer research.

The university is currently ranked 801-1000 in the World University Rankings 2025, 601-800 in the Medicine & Health 2025, and 301-400 in the Times Higher Education Impact 2021..

== Schools ==
=== Medicine ===
Golestan Medical School was established in 1992. It currently offers educational activities in master's degree programs (microbiology, anatomical sciences, clinical biochemistry, virology, immunology) and clinical residency programs (pediatrics, gynecology, internal medicine, anesthesia and intensive care, radiology, orthopedics, psychiatry, general surgery) and doctorate programs (traditional medicine, clinical biochemistry, virology) with more than 3,500 students.

=== Dentistry ===
In 2009, after the second presidential visit to Golestan Province, a license to establish the faculty was issued by the Council for the Development of Medical Sciences Universities, and since October 2010, the first group of doctoral students in dentistry and bachelor's degree in prosthetics have been studying.

=== Health care ===
In 1995, the establishment of the Paramedical School and also admission to the two majors of Laboratory Sciences and Public Health (Family Health Orientation) were proposed to the Development Council. In 1995, the establishment of the two aforementioned majors was approved by the Development Council, and finally, in 1997, the establishment of the Paramedical School was definitively approved. Also, in 1999, the associate degree in environmental health was added to the school's majors, and in 2000, the disease control major was added to the school's majors. In July 2007, based on the resolution of the University Board of Trustees and also on the resolution of the Council for the Development of Medical Sciences Universities of the country on 17/8/2008, the school was upgraded to the Faculty of Paramedical and Health. Based on the vote issued in the 209th meeting of the Council for the Development of Medical Sciences Universities on 23/11/2008, the establishment of the Faculty of Health was approved, and the Faculty of Health was separated from the Faculty of Paramedical. In 2016, with the permission of the Ministry of Health, the Master's degree program in Biostatistics was launched at the Faculty of Health, in 2022, the Master's degree program in Health Services Management, and in 2024, the Master's degree program in Environmental Health Engineering was launched at the Faculty of Health. Currently, the Faculty of Health accepts students in the fields of Environmental Health Engineering (full-time undergraduate, part-time undergraduate, and master's degrees), Public Health (full-time undergraduate and part-time undergraduate), Nutritional Sciences (bachelor's degree), Biostatistics (master's degree), and Health Services Management (master's degree).

=== Nursing ===
The School of Nursing and Midwifery began its operations in 1967 under the name of Buyeh Nursing School and became a nursing school in 1977 with the admission of students in the associate degree in nursing. In 1988 with the admission of students in the bachelor degree in nursing and in 1993 with the admission of students in the field of midwifery, the School of Nursing and Midwifery was formed. This school has been accepting students in postgraduate studies, including Master of Critical Care Nursing since 2009, Master of Geriatrics since 2015, Master of Counseling in Midwifery since 2013, and Doctorate in Nursing since 2014. The School of Nursing and Midwifery is currently located in a philosophical educational complex with an infrastructure of more than two thousand square meters on two floors. The school has a suitable educational space equipped with modern technology for holding classes. The school has a library, nursing practice, midwifery practice, an amphitheater, a workshop room, and a computer site. The school has 28 faculty members at the levels of professor, associate professor, assistant professor, and instructor. Currently, the faculty has 470 undergraduate students, including 404 nursing students, 66 midwifery students, 58 graduate students, including 14 critical care students, 17 geriatrics students, 27 midwifery counseling students, and 17 doctoral students in nursing. The faculty has so far graduated 1,755 undergraduate nursing students, 519 bachelor's degree midwifery students, 87 master's degree specialists, 23 master's degree geriatrics students, 36 master's degree midwifery counseling students, and 14 doctoral students.

=== Paramedicine ===
In 1995, the establishment of the Paramedical School and also the admission to two majors of Public Health Laboratory Sciences (Family Health Orientation) were proposed to the Development Council. In 1995, the establishment of the two aforementioned majors was approved by the Development Council, and finally, in 1997, the establishment of the Paramedical School was definitively approved. In 1997, after the establishment of the Gorgan Paramedical School, two majors of operating room and anesthesia, which are considered sub-majors of paramedical majors, were separated from the Boyeh Nursing Faculty and joined the Paramedical School. Also, in 1999, the associate degree in environmental health majors and in 2000, the disease control major were added to the school's majors. In July 2007, based on the resolution of the University Board of Trustees and also based on the resolution of the Development Council of Medical Universities of the country on 17/8/87, the school was upgraded to a faculty. In the second semester of the academic year 1399-1400, the admission of postgraduate students for specialized studies (fellowship) in laboratory sciences was approved, followed by the admission of postgraduate students for medical mycology in the first semester of the academic year 1399-1401, and they are currently studying at the faculty. Currently, the Faculty of Paramedical Sciences accepts students in the fields of operating room (bachelor's degree), anesthesia (bachelor's degree), laboratory sciences (bachelor's degree), health information technology (bachelor's degree), medical mycology (master's degree), and the postgraduate course in laboratory sciences (fellowship).

=== Medical Modern Technologies ===
The Faculty of Modern Medical Technologies aims to train personnel to conduct applied research, provide health technology services, and produce product-oriented medical knowledge. Operational plans outline the roles of faculty, students, and staff in developing technology and research networks within medical technology fields. Achieving these objectives requires updating the faculty's structure, scientific foundation, and technology development mechanisms. The faculty's primary objective is to define technology, evaluate its role in medical sciences, and identify technology needs across prevention, diagnosis, and treatment to establish research connections with basic and clinical science groups. Development strategies involve utilizing current faculty, student, and staff resources, forming partnerships with domestic and international scientific centers, and transferring technical knowledge through knowledge-based companies. The faculty offers programs in Medical Biotechnology, Molecular Medicine, Human Genetics, Medical Nanotechnology, Neuroscience, Applied Cellular Sciences, and Medical Bioinformatics.

=== The International Campus ===
The International Campus of Golestan University of Medical Sciences started its educational activities in the first semester of the academic year 2014-15, with the final approval of the relevant ministry in August 2013. This unit, by establishing the High Campus Council, also benefits from the suggestions of the respected university president and the respected members of the Board of Trustees and other members to advance the high goals of the system. Currently, the International Campus of Golestan University of Medical Sciences, with its university building with a capacity of 5,000 square meters, 100-person amphitheater classes, and an electronic examination hall with a capacity of 200 units, accepts Iranian students in various fields including medicine, dentistry, and undergraduate and graduate degrees (all fields available at the university). It is worth noting that all Iranian students on the campus are introduced through the entrance exam of the National Education Assessment Organization, and a number of Iranian students studying abroad are accepted as transfers from abroad upon introduction by the Ministry of Health, Treatment and Medical Education. Since the second semester of the academic year 2016-2017, the admission and commencement of studies of foreign (non-Iranian) students in various fields of medicine, dentistry, Master of Medical Safety and Master of Clinical Biochemistry; with the payment of foreign exchange tuition fees has begun. All students, by paying the tuition fees approved by the Board of Trustees, are studying in the stages of basic sciences and physiopathology (medicine) and basic sciences (dentistry) in the International Campus building of the university and, in accordance with internal memorandums of understanding with the faculties of medicine and dentistry, in accordance with educational regulations and bylaws and other relevant laws and regulations, are introduced to the above educational fields for the stages of medical training and internship from the clinical and clinical facilities of educational and medical centers (teaching hospitals) and for the field of dentistry from the clinical facilities and specialized departments of the Faculty of Dentistry.

=== Gonbad Kavous County Nursing School ===
Gonbad Kavous County Nursing School is a state educational unit and is considered one of the components of Golestan University of Medical Sciences and Health Services and is subject to the rules and regulations of the Ministry of Health, Treatment and Medical Education. Gonbad Kavous County Nursing School first began its activities under the name of Health Educational Complex in February 2015 with the admission of students in the field of Oral Health Technician. In February 2016, it also accepted students in the same field. Since February 2002, it resumed its activities with the admission of students in the field of Medical Emergencies and Public Health, with a focus on combating diseases. On 2003/04/26, it was upgraded to Gonbad Kavous County Nursing School at the 290th meeting of the Ministry of Health Development Council. (In-Principle Agreement) The purpose of establishing this educational unit is to develop targeted health education, establish justice in access to higher education, increase student admissions at the provincial level, train human resources at bachelor's and higher levels in the county, and also conduct scientific research in health services. The school has a suitable educational space equipped with up-to-date technology for holding classes. This faculty has a library, nursing practice, midwifery practice, an amphitheater, a workshop room, and a computer site.

== Research Centers ==
- Digestion and liver center
- Infectious Diseases center
- Health Management and Social Development center
- Nursing Research Center
- Dentistry center
- Clinical Research Development at Sayad Shirazi Hospital center
- Congenital Anomalies center
- Support for Clinical Research Development 5 Azar
- Stem Cells center
- Environmental Health center
- Rheumatology center
- Cancer Research Center
- Ischemic Disorders center
- Biochemistry and Metabolic Disorders center
- Psychiatry center
- Child and Infant Health center
- Food and Drug and Supplement Health center
- Cellular and Molecular Biology Research Center
- Neurosciences center
- Laboratory Sciences center
- Reproductive Health and Midwifery Counseling center
- Student Research Committee center

== Research Institute ==
- Biomedicine
- Jorjani Clinical Sciences

== Ranking ==
- Timeshighereducation Ranking

This university is currently ranked 801-1000 in the World University Rankings 2025, 601-800 in the Medicine & Health 2025, and 301-400 in the Times Higher Education Impact 2021.

- leidenranking

Golestan University of Medical Sciences appears for the first time in the Leiden ranking system

- Qs
- Webometrics

Ranking results for the last three years in the Webometrics ranking system

Evaluation period	Country rank	World rank
July 2022	63	3387
January 2023	59	3214
July 2023	58	3098
January 2024	52	2956
July 2024	49	2864
January 2025	46	2797

ISC World Ranking

	2023	2024	2025
Word university ranking	1801-2000	1601-1800	2001+
Islamic Word university ranking	201-250	151-175	

== International Journals ==
Golestan University of Medical Sciences has 6 journals, 2 of which are indexed in Scopus.

1. Jorjani Biomedicine Journal
2. Journal of Clinical and Basic Research
3. Journal of Gorgan University of Medical Sciences (Scopus)
4. Journal of Research Development in Nursing and Midwifery (Scopus)
5. Medical Laboratory Journal (MLJ)
6. International Journal of healthcare and Management and Development

== See also ==
- Higher education in Iran
