= University of Mazandaran =

University in Babolsar, Iran

Coordinates: 36.699644°N 52.646134°E

- دانشگاه‌ مازندران; Daneshgah-e Mazendâran
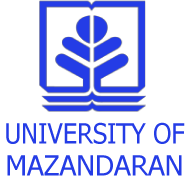
- Former names: Higher School of Economic and Social Sciences
- Type: Public
- Established: 1970
- President: Dr. Heshmatollah Alinezhad
- Faculty: 360
- Students: 12500
- Location: Babolsar, Mazandaran, Iran
- Campus: Urban
- Website: foreign.umz.ac.ir

University of Mazandaran is a public university in the city of Babolsar, Mazandaran Province. Before the 1979 Iranian Revolution, the university was known as the Higher School of Economic and Social Sciences.

In the latest ISC ranking in 2024, the University of Mazandaran ranks 31st among the universities of the country. Since 2010, the ranking of Iranian universities, by approval of the government, has been entrusted from the Ministry of Science and the Ministry of Health and Medical Education to the Islamic World Science and Technology Citation and Monitoring Institute or ISC.

== History ==
Babolsar College of Economics and Social Sciences (مدرسه‌ عالی‌ علوم‌ اقتصادی‌ و اجتماعی‌ بابلسر) was founded in 1970 and then in 1979 was merged with College of Higher Education (دانشكده‌ تحصیلات‌ تكمیلی) est. 1974, Babol Higher Technical School (دانشسرای عالی فنی بابل) est. 1969, Sari College of Agriculture (مدرسه عالی كشاورزی ساری) est 1972, and Gorgan School of Natural Resources (مدرسه عالی منابع طبیعی گرگان) est. 1957, which later separated off into Gorgan University in 1986. After merging this colleges, a new name was given to these educational centers. University of Mazandaran became the official name ever since.

Before the 1979 Iranian Revolution, the university was known as the Higher School of Economic and Social Sciences.

In the latest ISC ranking in 2024, the University of Mazandaran ranks 31st among the universities of the country. Since 2010, the ranking of Iranian universities, by approval of the government, has been entrusted from the Ministry of Science and the Ministry of Health and Medical Education to the Islamic World Science and Technology Citation and Monitoring Institute or ISC.

== Currently ==
The university currently covers an area of 350 hectares, and operates 6 Faculties, offering bachelor's degrees and twenty-six postgraduate programs in M.A, M.Sc and/or Ph.D levels.

== Faculties ==
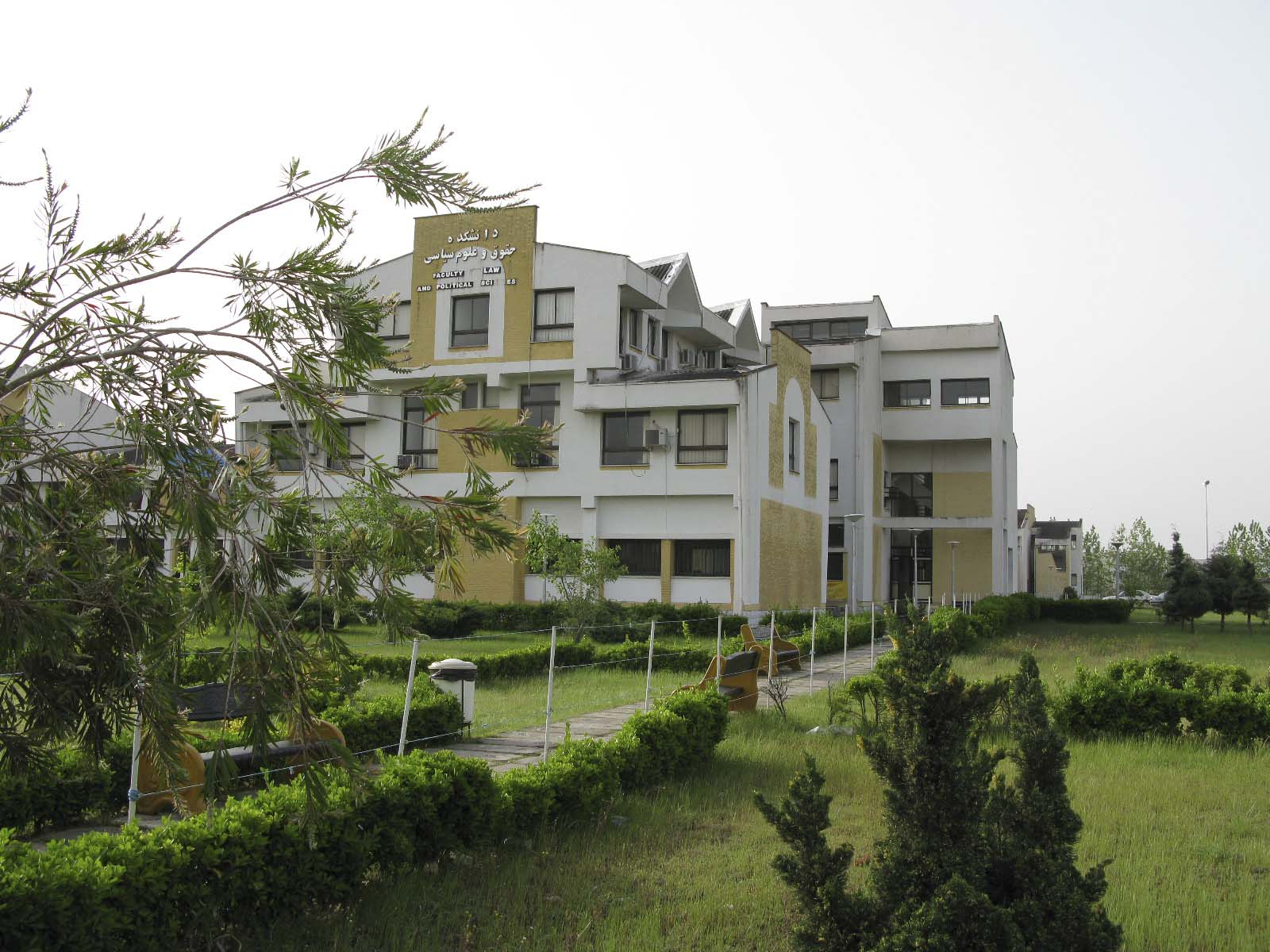
Faculty of Law & Political Science

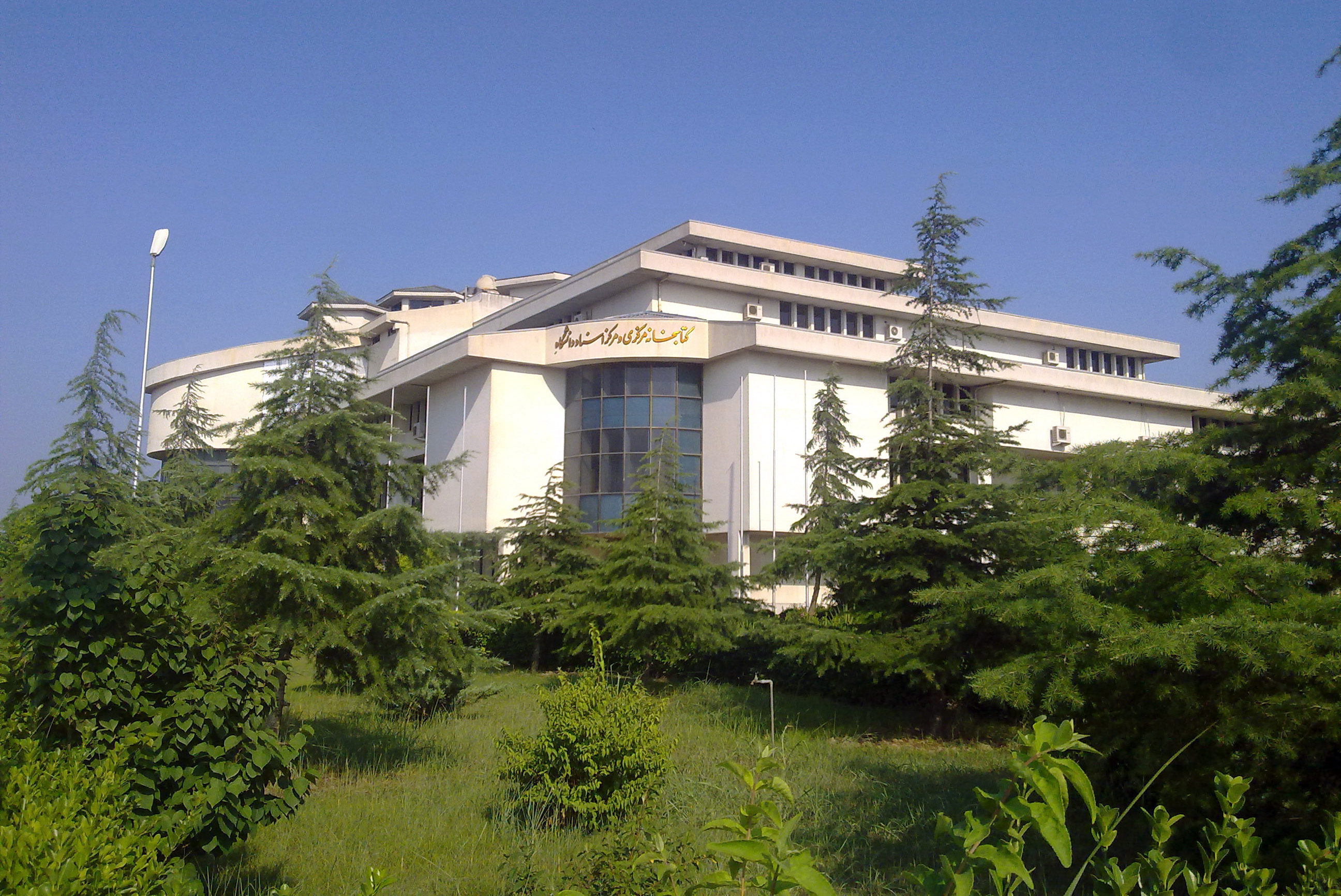
The Central Library and Documentation Center

- Faculty of Architecture & Art
    - Year of establishment: 2003 * Location: Babolsar City, Main Campus * Faculty members: 28 * Number of students: 754 * Degree Courses: * BA: handicraft arts, architecture, urban development, * MA: Art Research
- Faculty of Basic Sciences
    - Year of establishment: 1977 * Location: Babolsar, Main Campus * Faculty members: 44 * Number of students: 1368 * Degree Courses: - BSc: Cell and Molecular Biology, Plant Biology, Zoological Sciences, Solid State Physics, Atomic and Molecular Physics, Nuclear Physics - MSc: Systematic Biology, Plant Ecology, Animal Physiology, Solid State Physics, Atomic and Molecular Physics, Nuclear Physics, Particle Physics, Astronomy, Cell and Molecular Biology, Microbiology - PhD.: Solid State Physics, Atomic and Molecular Physics, Nuclear Physics, Particle Physics, Astronomy, NANO Physics, Cosmology
- Faculty of Chemistry
    - Year of establishment: 1978 * Location: Babolsar, Main Campus * Faculty members: 29 * Number of students: 869 * Degree Courses: * BSc: Applied Chemistry, and Pure Chemistry * MSc: Analytical Chemistry, Organic Chemistry, Inorganic Chemistry, Physical Chemistry, NANO Sciences and Technology * Ph.D.: Chemistry-Physics: Polymer and Kinetic, Computational Quantum, Electrochemistry Kinetic, Statistical Thermodynamics, Analytical Chemistry, Chemometrics, Electrochemistry, Spectroscopy, Separation, Organic Chemistry, Polymer Chemistry
- Faculty of Economics & Administrative Science
  - Year of establishment: 2004 * Location: Babolsar Pardis Complex * Faculty members: 35 * Number of students: 2570 * Degree Courses: - BA: Accounting, Economic Sciences, Theoretical Economics, Commercial Economics, Business Management, Industrial Management - MA: Accounting, Economic Sciences, Administrative Management, Business Management, Industrial Management - Ph. D.: Islamic Economics, Public Economics, Financial Economics, Econometrics, Development Economics, International Economics, Regional Economics, Statistics and Management, Production and Operation.
- Faculty of Engineering & Technology
    - Year of establishment: 2007 * Location: Babolsar, Main Campus * Faculty members: 24 * Number of students: 1332 * Degree Courses: B.Sc.: IT Engineering, Computer Engineering- Software, Chemical Engineering, and Civil Engineering M.Sc.: Civil Engineering
- Faculty of Culture Heritage, Handicraft and Tourism
    - Year of establishment: 2003 * Location: Babolsar, Main Campus * Degree Courses: BA: Tourism Management, Anthropology
- Faculty of Humanity & Social Science
    - Year of establishment: 1981 * Location: Babolsar, Main Campus * Faculty members: 74 * Number of students: 3006 * Degree Courses: - BA: Geography and Urban planning, English Language and Literature, Teaching English as a Foreign Language, Arabic Language and Literature, Persian Language and Literature, Russian Language Translation, Research in Social Sciences, Anthropology, Education, Tourism Management. - MSc: Teaching English as a Foreign Language, Geography and Urban Planning, Physical Geography, Ecotourism, Arabic Language and Literature, Persian Language and Literature, Social Sciences, Sociology, Youth Studies, Educational Administration and Planning, Philosophy of Education * Ph.D.: Persian Language and Literature, Sociology, Social Issues of Iran, Higher Education Development, Psychology
- Faculty of Law & Political Science
    - Year of establishment: 2005 * Location: Babolsar City, Main Campus * Faculty members: 23 * Number of students: 1029 * Degree Courses: * BA: law * MA: Criminal law, public law, international relations, political sciences * Ph.D.: criminal law and criminology, civil law
- Faculty of Mathematical Sciences
    - Year of establishment: 2009 * Location: Babolsar, Main Campus * Faculty members: 29 * Number of students: 998 * Degree Courses: - BSc: Statistics and its Applications, Pure Mathematics Applied Mathematics, Computer Sciences, - MSc: Mathematical Statistics, Pure Mathematics, Analysis, Geometry, Applied Mathematics, Research in Operation, Algebra, Numerical Analysis, Computer Sciences, - Ph.D.: Applied Mathematics (Numerical Analysis, Research in Operation), Asymptotic Analysis, Ring and Module, Pure Mathematics (Functional Applied Analysis), Differential Operators, Operators Theory, Algebraic, Graph Theory, Differential Geometric)
- Faculty of Physical Education & Sport Sciences
    - Year of establishment: 2005 * Location: Babolsar, Main Campus * Faculty members: 17 * Number of students: 484 * Degree Courses: - B.Sc.: Physical Education, Exercise Physiology, Sports Management, Sports Biomechanics - M.Sc.: Physical Education, Exercise Physiology, Sports Management, Sports Biomechanics - Ph.D.: Exercise Physiology, Sports Management, Sports Biomechanics
- Faculty of Theological Science
  - This faculty first was established in 1970 as the Technical Teachers Training Institute of Babol. In 1979 it amalgamated with the University of Mazandaran and operated as University of Mazandaran Faculty of Engineering. In 2005, the process of independence from University of Mazandaran started and until March 2008 it was operated as Noshirvani Institute of Technology (Babol Noshiravani Technical and Education Complex). The graduated student of Mazandaran University in Engineering until 2012 were studied in Babol Babol Noshiravani Technical and Education Complex. Babol Noshirvani University of Technology
    - Year of establishment: 2007
    - Location: Babolsar, Main Campus
        - Faculty members: 24 * Number of students: 1332 * Degree Courses: B.Sc.: IT Engineering, Computer Engineering- Software, Chemical Engineering, and Civil Engineering M.Sc.: Civil Engineering
- Faculty of Marine & Oceanic Sciences
  - Year of Establishment: 2002 Location: Babolsar, Main Campus Faculty Members: 5 Number of Students: 46 Degree Courses: MSc: Marine Chemistry, Marine Biology, Marine Physics

== Partner universities ==
In 2016, the university signed a partnership with Al-Beroni University to promote faculty exchange and networking.

- (Afghanistan) Al-Beroni University

== See also ==
- Higher education in Iran
- Golestan University
- Babol Noshirvani University of Technology
- Gorgan University of Agricultural Sciences and Natural Resources
- Allameh Mohaddes Nouri University
- List of universities in Iran
- Habib Nafisi
