= Gorgan University =

University in Golestan, Iran

Coordinates: 36°50′32″N 54°26′22″E

Gorgan University of Agricultural Sciences and Natural Resources
- دانشگاه علوم کشاورزی و منابع طبیعی گرگان; Daneshgah-e Olum-e Keshavârzi vâ Mânabe'-e Tâbi'i-ye Gorgan
- Type: Public
- Established: 1957
- President: Dr. Shaban Shataee Jouybari
- Faculty: 150
- Students: 3,403
- Undergraduates: 2,178
- Postgraduates: 1,225
- Location: Gorgan, Golestan Province, Iran
- Campus: Urban
- Website: www.gau.ac.ir

Gorgan University of Agricultural Sciences and Natural Resources, also called Gorgan University, is a university in Golestan Province of Iran.

== History ==
First founded in 1957 as the Junior College of Forestry and Range Management (مدرسه عالی منابع طبيعی گرگان), the university was among the first specialized agricultural universities of Iran. Through a course of continued development, the Junior College was promoted to the school of Natural Resources offering three major courses in Forestry, Range Management, and Soil Conservation in 1975.

After the 1979 Iranian Revolution, the School of Natural Resources was joined by the Ministry of Science, Research and Technology in 1981 and became part of the Mazandaran University.

In 1986, the school was united with the Junior College of Agriculture in the town of Gonbad and obtained approval from the Council of Academic Development of the Ministry of Science, Research and Technology, to upgrade to an independent institute called Gorgan University Complex of Agricultural Sciences and Natural Resources. Today, the university has 9 Colleges (Faculties), training 2800 graduate and post-graduate students. The university has an exchange student program with Astrakhan State University in neighbouring Russia.

The university is located in the historical city of Gorgan in the Golestan Province.

== Faculties ==
- Animal Science
- Agricultural Management
- Fisheries & Environmental Sciences
- Food Science & Technology
- Forest Science
- Plant Production
- Rangeland & Watershed Management
- Water & Soil Engineering
- Wood & Paper Engineering

== Journals ==
- Iranian journal of Aquatics Research
- International Journal of Lignocellulosic Products
- International Journal of Plant Production
- International Journal of Environmental Resources Research
- Poultry Science Journal
- Journal of Natural Resource Conservation (Persian)
- Electronic Journal of Crop Production (Persian)
- Journal of Ruminant Research (Persian)
- Journal of Range Land (Persian)
- Poultry Science Journal (Persian)
- Journal of Soil Management and Sustainable Production (Persian)
- Journal of Entrepreneurship & Agricultural Extension (Persian)
- Journal of Plant Production (Persian)
- Journal of Food Processing and Preservation (Persian)
- Journal of Aquaculture (Persian)
- Journal of Living in Environment (Persian)
- Journal of Wood Science and Technology (Persian)

== See also ==
- List of Islamic educational institutions
- Higher education in Iran
