= Baluchabad =

Baluchabad (Persian: بلوچ اباد) may refer to:

- Baluchabad, Aliabad, Golestan Province
- Baluchabad, Galikash, Golestan Province
- Baluchabad, Gorgan, Golestan Province
- Baluchabad, Ramian, Golestan Province
- Baluchabad-e Gardayesh, Golestan Province
- Baluchabad-e Mashu, Golestan Province
- Baluchabad, Kerman
- Baluchabad, Faryab, Kerman Province
- Baluchabad, Sistan and Baluchestan
- Baluchabad-e Kahnaki, Sistan and Baluchestan Province
