= Okhli (disambiguation) =

Okhli (Persian: اوخلي) may refer to:

- Okhli, a village in North Khorasan Province, Iran
- Okhli, Republic of Dagestan, a rural locality in Dagestan, Russia
- Okhli-ye Bala, a village in Golestan Province, Iran
- Okhli-ye Forugah Farahnak, a village in Golestan Province, Iran
- Okhli-ye Pain, a village in Golestan Province, Iran
