= Sazeman-e Darya =

Sazeman-e Darya سازمان دريا
- Village
- Location within Iran
- Coordinates: 37°05′48″N 55°03′54″E
- Country: Iran
- Province: Golestan
- County: Ramian
- Bakhsh: Central
- Rural District: Daland

Population (2016)
  - Total: 236
- Time zone: UTC+3:30 (IRST)

Sazeman-e Darya (Persian: سازمان دريا, also Romanized as Sāzemān-e Daryā), also known as Darya, is a village in Daland Rural District, in the Central District of Ramian County, Golestan Province, Iran. It is a southern suburb of Tatar-e Olya city.

At the time of the 2006 National Census, the village's population was 226 in 49 households. The following census in 2011 counted 207 people in 48 households. The 2016 census measured the population of the village as 236 people in 63 households.
