= Qarah Qach =

Qarah Qach or Qarah Qaj or Qaragaj or Qareh Qach or Qareh Qaj (Persian: قره قاچ or قره قاج), also rendered as Qara Qaj, may refer to:

- Qarah Qach, Chaharmahal and Bakhtiari
- Qarah Qach, Golestan
- Qarah Qach, Isfahan
- Qareh Qaj, Kermanshah
- Qarah Qach, West Azerbaijan
