= Sadd =

Sadd (Persian: سد, meaning "dam", "wall", or "rampart") may refer to:

- Sadd-e Chamran
- Sadd-e Ekbatan
- Sadd-e Kalateh
- Sadd-e Karun Chahar
- Sadd-e Kharu
- Sadd-e Kheyrabad
- Sadd-e Shavur
- Sadd-e Toroq

== See also ==
- SADD (computing), a sideways bit addition instruction in Donald Knuth's MMIX implementation
- Students Against Destructive Decisions, a students organization
