= Dar Kalateh =

Village in Golestan province, Iran

Dar Kalateh Persian: داركلاته
- Village
- Location within Iran
- Coordinates: 36°57′56″N 54°57′32″E
- Country: Iran
- Province: Golestan
- County: Ramian
- District: Fenderesk
- Rural District: Fenderesk-e Jonubi

Population (2016)
  - Total: 1,872
- Time zone: UTC+3:30 (IRST)

Dar Kalateh (Persian: داركلاته) (Note: Also romanized as Dār Kalāteh) is a village in, and the capital of, Fenderesk-e Jonubi Rural District (Note: Formerly Fenderesk Rural District) in Fenderesk District of Ramian County, Golestan province, Iran.

== Demographics ==
=== Population ===
At the time of the 2006 National Census, the village's population was 1,824 in 490 households. The following census in 2011 counted 1,934 people in 599 households. The 2016 census measured the population of the village as 1,872 people in 616 households.
