= Galand =

Village in Golestan province, Iran

Galand Persian: گلند
- Village
- Location within Iran
- Coordinates: 37°02′00″N 55°01′51″E
- Country: Iran
- Province: Golestan
- County: Ramian
- District: Central
- Rural District: Daland

Population (2016)
  - Total: 2,303
- Time zone: UTC+3:30 (IRST)

Galand (Persian: گلند) (Note: Also known as Findarisk and Garland) is a village in Daland Rural District of the Central District in Ramian County, Golestan province, Iran.

== Demographics ==
=== Population ===
At the time of the 2006 National Census, the village's population was 2,485 in 571 households. The following census in 2011 counted 2,265 people in 636 households. The 2016 census measured the population of the village as 2,303 people in 688 households.
