= Razi, Golestan =

Village in Golestan province, Iran

Razi Persian: رضی
- Village
- Location within Iran
- Coordinates: 36°53′10″N 55°11′54″E
- Country: Iran
- Province: Golestan
- County: Ramian
- District: Central
- Rural District: Qaleh Miran

Population (2016)
  - Total: 172
- Time zone: UTC+3:30 (IRST)

Razi (Persian: رضی) (Note: Also romanized as Raẕī and Razi; also known as Rizi) is a village in Qaleh Miran Rural District of the Central District in Ramian County, Golestan province, Iran.

== Demographics ==
=== Population ===
At the time of the 2006 National Census, the village's population was 196 in 52 households. The following census in 2011 counted 123 people in 40 households. The 2016 census measured the population of the village as 172 people in 59 households.
