= Hemmatabad, Ramian =

Village in Golestan province, Iran

Hemmatabad Persian: همت آباد
- Village
- Location within Iran
- Coordinates: 37°00′09″N 55°00′01″E
- Country: Iran
- Province: Golestan
- County: Ramian
- District: Fenderesk
- Rural District: Fenderesk-e Shomali

Population (2016)
  - Total: 128
- Time zone: UTC+3:30 (IRST)

Hemmatabad (Persian: همت آباد) (Note: Also romanized as Hemmatābād) is a village in Fenderesk-e Shomali Rural District of Fenderesk District in Ramian County, Golestan province, Iran.

== Demographics ==
=== Population ===
At the time of the 2006 National Census, the village's population was 99 in 24 households. The following census in 2011 counted 131 people in 35 households. The 2016 census measured the population of the village as 128 people in 40 households.
