= Naqiabad =

Naqiabad (Persian: نقي اباد) may refer to:

- Naqiabad, Golestan
- Naqiabad, North Khorasan
- Naqiabad-e Nadar, Lorestan Province
