= Nar Kalateh =

Village in Golestan province, Iran

Nar Kalateh Persian: ناركلاته
- Village
- Location within Iran
- Coordinates: 37°03′41″N 55°06′18″E
- Country: Iran
- Province: Golestan
- County: Ramian
- District: Central
- Rural District: Daland

Population (2016)
  - Total: 738
- Time zone: UTC+3:30 (IRST)

Nar Kalateh (Persian: ناركلاته) (Note: Also romanized as Nār Kalāteh; also known as Tār Kalāteh) is a village in Daland Rural District of the Central District in Ramian County, Golestan province, Iran.

== Demographics ==
=== Population ===
At the time of the 2006 National Census, the village's population was 593 in 123 households. The following census in 2011 counted 710 people in 179 households. The 2016 census measured the population of the village as 738 people in 207 households.
