= Allahabad, Golestan =

Allahabad الله‌آباد
- Village
- Location within Iran
- Coordinates: 37°02′40″N 55°04′24″E
- Country: Iran
- Province: Golestan
- County: Ramian
- Bakhsh: Central
- Rural District: Daland

Population (2016)
  - Total: 216
- Time zone: UTC+3:30 (IRST)

Allahabad (Persian: الله‌آباد, also Romanized as Allāhābād) is a village in Daland Rural District, in the Central District of Ramian County, Golestan Province, Iran.

At the time of the 2006 National Census, the village's population was 185 in 45 households. The following census in 2011 counted 186 people in 45 households. The 2016 census measured the population of the village as 216 people in 62 households.
