= Sadabad-e Fenderesk =

Village in Golestan province, Iran

Sadabad-e Fenderesk Persian: سعدآباد فندرسک
- Village
- Location within Iran
- Coordinates: 37°00′13″N 54°57′25″E
- Country: Iran
- Province: Golestan
- County: Ramian
- District: Fenderesk
- Rural District: Fenderesk-e Shomali

Population (2016)
  - Total: 2,166
- Time zone: UTC+3:30 (IRST)

Sadabad-e Fenderesk (Persian: سعدآباد فندرسک) (Note: Also romanized as Sa‘dābād-e Fenderesk) is a village in, and the capital of, Fenderesk-e Shomali Rural District in Fenderesk District of Ramian County, Golestan province, Iran.

== Demographics ==
=== Population ===
At the time of the 2006 National Census, the village's population was 2,268 in 555 households. The following census in 2011 counted 2,304 people in 689 households. The 2016 census measured the population of the village as 2,166 people in 698 households. It was the most populous village in its rural district.
