= Rajan, Iran =

Village in Golestan province, Iran

Rajan Persian: رجن
- Village
- Location within Iran
- Coordinates: 36.889°N 55.142°E
- Country: Iran
- Province: Golestan
- County: Ramian
- District: Central
- Rural District: Qaleh Miran

Population (2016)
  - Total: 10
- Time zone: UTC+3:30 (IRST)

Rajan (Persian: رجن) is a village in Qaleh Miran Rural District of the Central District in Ramian County, Golestan province, Iran.

Rajan lies inside the forested Alborz mountains, and has a waterfall.

== Demographics ==
=== Population ===
The 2006 National Census recorded a permanent population of 0. The following census in 2011 counted 40 people in 12 households. The 2016 census measured the population of the village as 10 people in 6 households.
