= Rezaabad, Golestan =

Village in Golestan province, Iran

Rezaabad Persian: رضاآباد
- Village
- Location within Iran
- Coordinates: 36°57′19″N 54°56′40″E
- Country: Iran
- Province: Golestan
- County: Ramian
- District: Fenderesk
- Rural District: Fenderesk-e Jonubi

Population (2016)
  - Total: 4,568
- Time zone: UTC+3:30 (IRST)

Rezaabad (Persian: رضاآباد) (Note: Also romanized as Reẕāābād) is a village in Fenderesk-e Jonubi Rural District (Note: Formerly Fenderesk Rural District) of Fenderesk District in Ramian County, Golestan province, Iran.

== Demographics ==
=== Population ===
At the time of the 2006 National Census, the village's population was 2,441 in 560 households. The following census in 2011 counted 2,893 people in 718 households. The 2016 census measured the population of the village as 4,568 people in 1,174 households. It was the most populous village in its rural district.
