= Ney Tappeh =

Village in Golestan province, Iran

Ney Tappeh Persian: نی تپه
- Village
- Location within Iran
- Coordinates: 37°01′54″N 54°57′28″E
- Country: Iran
- Province: Golestan
- County: Ramian
- District: Fenderesk
- Rural District: Fenderesk-e Shomali

Population (2016)
  - Total: 1,282
- Time zone: UTC+3:30 (IRST)

Ney Tappeh (Persian: نی تپه) is a village in Fenderesk-e Shomali Rural District of Fenderesk District in Ramian County, Golestan province, Iran.

== Demographics ==
=== Population ===
At the time of the 2006 National Census, the village's population was 1,308 in 317 households. The following census in 2011 counted 1,350 people in 379 households. The 2016 census measured the population of the village as 1,282 people in 374 households.
