= Sazeman-e Hajj Seyd =

Sazeman-e Hajj Seyyed سازمان حاج سيد
- Village
- Interactive map of Sazeman-e Hajj Seyyed
- Coordinates: 37.0935°N 55.026°E
- Country: Iran
- Province: Golestan
- County: Ramian
- Bakhsh: Central
- Rural District: Daland

Population (2016)
  - Total: 137
- Time zone: UTC+3:30 (IRST)

Sazeman-e Hajj Seyyed (Persian: سازمان حاج سيد, also Romanized as Sāzemān-e Ḩājj Seyyed) is a village in Daland Rural District, in the Central District of Ramian County, Golestan Province, Iran.

At the time of the 2006 National Census, the village's population was 106 in 27 households. The following census in 2011 counted 127 people in 33 households. The 2016 census measured the population of the village as 137 people in 47 households.
