= Pol-e Aram =

Village in Golestan province, Iran

Pol-e Aram Persian: پل آرام
- Village
- Location within Iran
- Coordinates: 36°55′17″N 55°07′21″E
- Country: Iran
- Province: Golestan
- County: Ramian
- District: Central
- Rural District: Qaleh Miran

Population (2016)
  - Total: 96
- Time zone: UTC+3:30 (IRST)

Pol-e Aram (Persian: پل آرام) (Note: Also romanized as Pol-e Ārām) is a village in Qaleh Miran Rural District of the Central District in Ramian County, Golestan province, Iran.

== Demographics ==
=== Population ===
At the time of the 2006 National Census, the village's population was 37 in 11 households. The following census in 2011 counted 13 people in four households. The 2016 census measured the population of the village as 96 people in 31 households.
