= Hoseynabad-e Tappeh Sari =

Village in Golestan province, Iran

Hoseynabad-e Tappeh Sari Persian: حسين آباد تپه سری
- Village
- Location within Iran
- Coordinates: 36°58′43″N 54°56′19″E
- Country: Iran
- Province: Golestan
- County: Ramian
- District: Fenderesk
- Rural District: Fenderesk-e Jonubi

Population (2016)
  - Total: 482
- Time zone: UTC+3:30 (IRST)

Hoseynabad-e Tappeh Sari (Persian: حسين آباد تپه سری) (Note: Also romanized as Ḩoseynābād-e Tappeh Sarī; also known as Ḩoseynābād-e Tappehsar) is a village in Fenderesk-e Jonubi Rural District (Note: Formerly Fenderesk Rural District) of Fenderesk District in Ramian County, Golestan province, Iran.

== Demographics ==
=== Population ===
At the time of the 2006 National Census, the village's population was 530 in 123 households. The following census in 2011 counted 443 people in 129 households. The 2016 census measured the population of the village as 482 people in 144 households.
