= Hoseynabad-e Qorbani, Ramian =

Hoseynabad-e Qorbani حسين آباد قربانی
- Village
- Location within Iran
- Coordinates: 37°03′45″N 55°02′22″E
- Country: Iran
- Province: Golestan
- County: Ramian
- Bakhsh: Central
- Rural District: Daland

Population (2016)
  - Total: 473
- Time zone: UTC+3:30 (IRST)

Hoseynabad-e Qorbani (Persian: حسين آباد قربانی, also Romanized as Ḩoseynābād-e Qorbānī; also known as Ḩoseynābād-e Do) is a village in Daland Rural District, in the Central District of Ramian County, Golestan Province, Iran.

At the time of the 2006 National Census, the village's population was 462 in 90 households. The following census in 2011 counted 455 people in 103 households. The 2016 census measured the population of the village as 473 people in 113 households.
