= Turan-e Fars =

Village in Golestan province, Iran

Turan-e Fars Persian: توران فارس
- Village
- Location within Iran
- Coordinates: 37°04′40″N 55°04′27″E
- Country: Iran
- Province: Golestan
- County: Ramian
- District: Central
- Rural District: Daland

Population (2016)
  - Total: 2,581
- Time zone: UTC+3:30 (IRST)

Turan-e Fars (Persian: توران فارس) (Note: Also romanized as Tūrān-e Fārs; also known as Tūrān-e Fārsī) is a village in, and the capital of, Daland Rural District in the Central District of Ramian County, Golestan province, Iran. The previous capital of the rural district was the city of Daland.

== Demographics ==
=== Population ===
At the time of the 2006 National Census, the village's population was 2,492 in 652 households. The following census in 2011 counted 2,610 people in 796 households. The 2016 census measured the population of the village as 2,581 people in 872 households.
