= Azdari =

Village in Golestan province, Iran

Azdari Persian: ازداری
- Village
- Location within Iran
- Coordinates: 37°01′23″N 55°00′18″E
- Country: Iran
- Province: Golestan
- County: Ramian
- District: Fenderesk
- Rural District: Fenderesk-e Shomali

Population (2016)
  - Total: 190
- Time zone: UTC+3:30 (IRST)

Azdari (Persian: ازداری) (Note: Also romanized as Āzdārī) is a village in Fenderesk-e Shomali Rural District of Fenderesk District in Ramian County, Golestan province, Iran.

== Demographics ==
=== Population ===
At the time of the 2006 National Census, the village's population was 311 in 80 households. The following census in 2011 counted 216 people in 57 households. The 2016 census measured the population of the village as 190 people in 58 households.
