= Shesh Ab =

Village in Golestan province, Iran

Shesh Ab Persian: شش آب
- Village
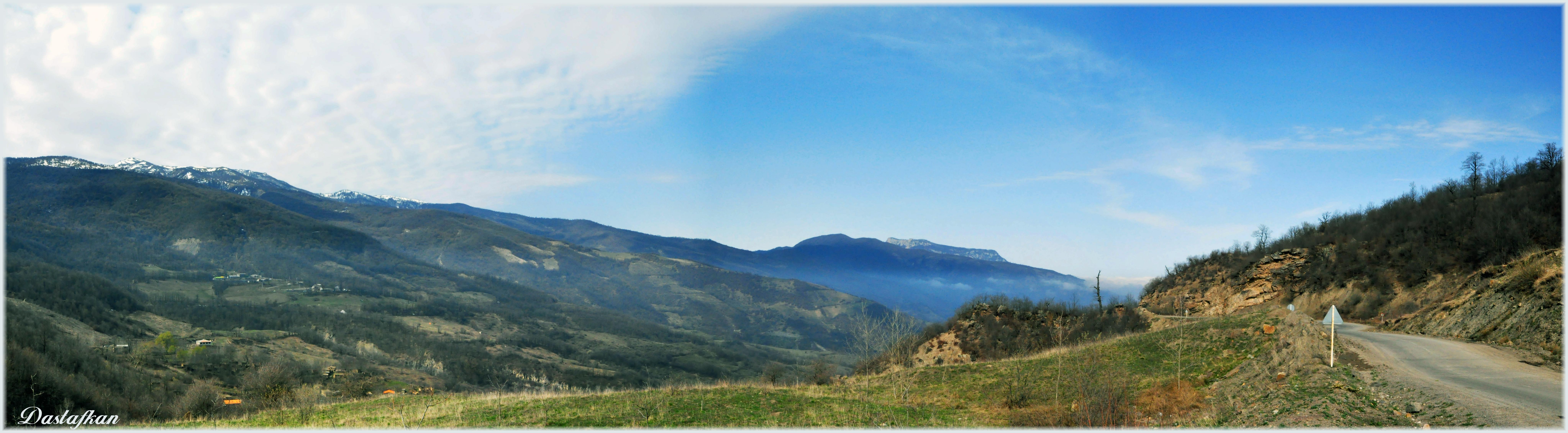
- Panoramic view of Shesh Ab area

- Location within Iran
- Coordinates: 36°55′53″N 55°07′32″E
- Country: Iran
- Province: Golestan
- County: Ramian
- District: Central
- Rural District: Qaleh Miran

Population (2016)
  - Total: 98
- Time zone: UTC+3:30 (IRST)

Shesh Ab (Persian: شش آب) (Note: Also romanized as Shesh Āb) is a village in Qaleh Miran Rural District of the Central District in Ramian County, Golestan province, Iran.

== Demographics ==
=== Population ===
At the time of the 2006 National Census, the village's population was 91 in 22 households. The following census in 2011 counted 79 people in 24 households. The 2016 census measured the population of the village as 98 people in 29 households.
