= Eslamabad-e Sofla, Golestan =

Eslamabad-e Sofla اسلام آباد سفلی
- Village
- Location within Iran
- Coordinates: 37°02′11″N 55°00′25″E
- Country: Iran
- Province: Golestan
- County: Ramian
- Bakhsh: Central
- Rural District: Daland

Population (2016)
  - Total: 401
- Time zone: UTC+3:30 (IRST)

Eslamabad-e Sofla (Persian: اسلام آباد سفلی, also Romanized as Eslāmābād-e Soflá; also known as Eslāmābād) is a village in Daland Rural District, in the Central District of Ramian County, Golestan Province, Iran.

At the time of the 2006 National Census, the village's population was 350 in 67 households. The following census in 2011 counted 398 people in 90 households. The 2016 census measured the population of the village as 401 people in 99 households.
