= Malech-e Aram =

Village in Golestan province, Iran

Malech-e Aram Persian: ملچ آرام
- Village
- Location within Iran
- Coordinates: 36°51′34″N 55°13′57″E
- Country: Iran
- Province: Golestan
- County: Ramian
- District: Central
- Rural District: Qaleh Miran

Population (2016)
  - Total: 49
- Time zone: UTC+3:30 (IRST)

Malech-e Aram (Persian: ملچ آرام) (Note: Also romanized as Malech-e Ārām) is a village in Qaleh Miran Rural District of the Central District in Ramian County, Golestan province, Iran.

== Demographics ==
=== Population ===
The 2006 National Census recorded a permanent population of 0. The following census in 2011 counted 27 people in 21 households. The 2016 census measured the population of the village as 49 people in 17 households.
