= Shafiabad, Golestan =

Village in Golestan province, Iran

Shafiabad Persian: شفيع آباد
- Village
- Location within Iran
- Coordinates: 36°57′45″N 54°58′18″E
- Country: Iran
- Province: Golestan
- County: Ramian
- District: Fenderesk
- Rural District: Fenderesk-e Jonubi

Population (2016)
  - Total: 1,155
- Time zone: UTC+3:30 (IRST)

Shafiabad (Persian: شفيع آباد) (Note: Also romanized as Shafī‘ābād) is a village in Fenderesk-e Jonubi Rural District (Note: Formerly Fenderesk Rural District) of Fenderesk District in Ramian County, Golestan province, Iran.

== Demographics ==
=== Population ===
At the time of the 2006 National Census, the village's population was 1,051 in 262 households. The following census in 2011 counted 1,160 people in 353 households. The 2016 census measured the population of the village as 1,155 people in 367 households.
