= Kalu, Ramian =

Village in Golestan province, Iran

Kalu Persian: كلو
- Village
- Location within Iran
- Coordinates: 37°05′07″N 55°07′10″E
- Country: Iran
- Province: Golestan
- County: Ramian
- District: Central
- Rural District: Daland

Population (2016)
  - Total: 656
- Time zone: UTC+3:30 (IRST)

Kalu (Persian: كلو) (Note: Also romanized as Kalū) is a village in Daland Rural District of the Central District in Ramian County, Golestan province, Iran.

== Demographics ==
=== Population ===
At the time of the 2006 National Census, the village's population was 700 in 162 households. The following census in 2011 counted 749 people in 212 households. The 2016 census measured the population of the village as 656 people in 195 households.
