= Eslamabad-e Olya, Golestan =

Eslamabad-e Olya اسلام آباد عليا
- Village
- Location within Iran
- Coordinates: 37°02′32″N 55°00′07″E
- Country: Iran
- Province: Golestan
- County: Ramian
- Bakhsh: Central
- Rural District: Daland

Population (2016)
  - Total: 340
- Time zone: UTC+3:30 (IRST)

Eslamabad-e Olya (Persian: اسلام آباد عليا, also Romanized as Eslāmābād-e ‘Olyā) is a village in Daland Rural District, in the Central District of Ramian County, Golestan Province, Iran.

At the time of the 2006 National Census, the village's population was 317 in 78 households. The following census in 2011 counted 321 people in 83 households. The 2016 census measured the population of the village as 340 people in 102 households.
