= Pa Qaleh, Golestan =

Village in Golestan province, Iran

Pa Qaleh Persian: پاقلعه
- Village
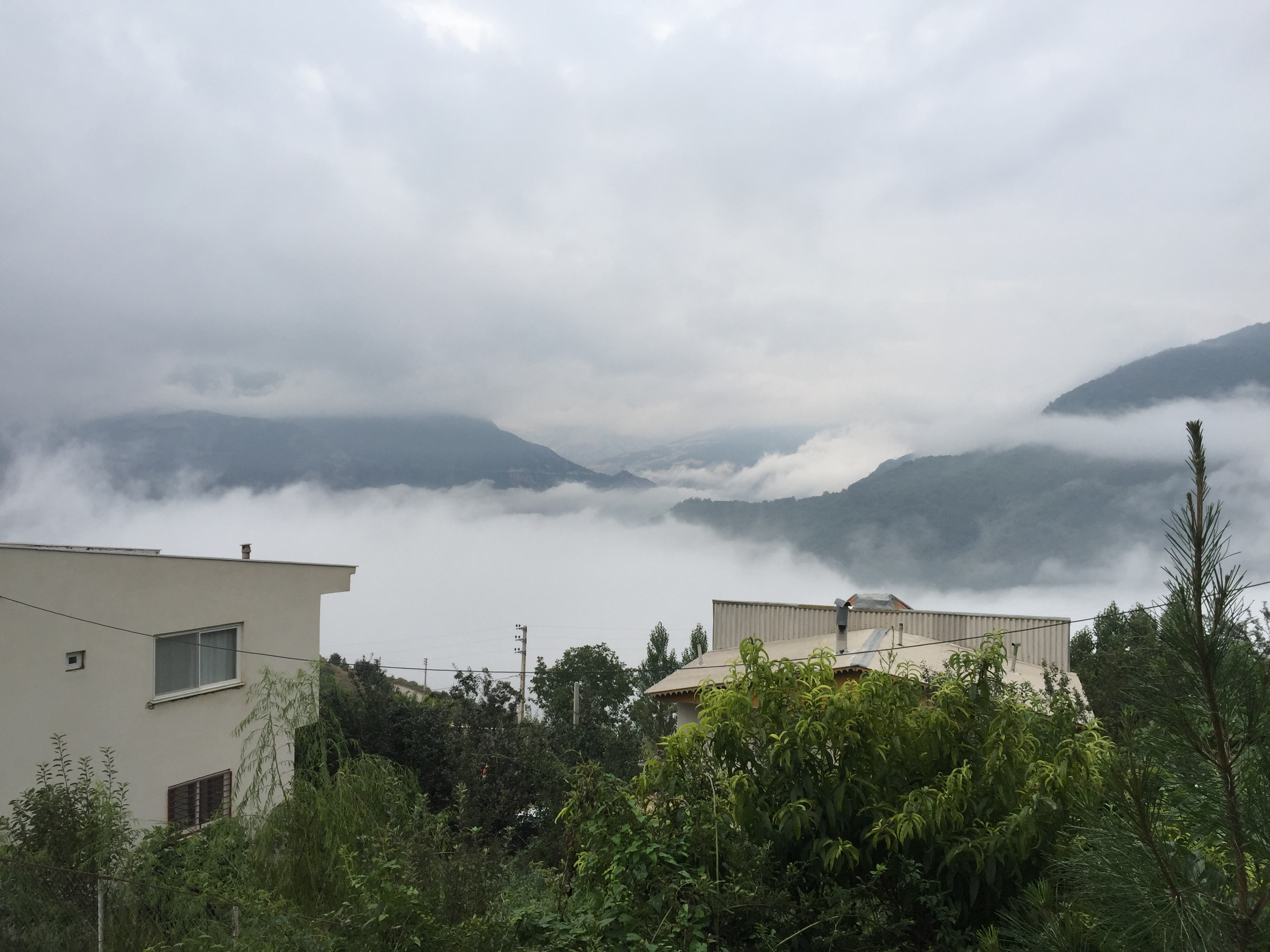
- Pa Qaleh Landscape

- Location within Iran
- Coordinates: 36°54′48″N 55°06′06″E
- Country: Iran
- Province: Golestan
- County: Ramian
- District: Central
- Rural District: Qaleh Miran

Population (2016)
  - Total: 304
- Time zone: UTC+3:30 (IRST)

Pa Qaleh (Persian: پاقلعه) (Note: Also romanized as Pā Qal‘eh) is a village in Qaleh Miran Rural District of the Central District in Ramian County, Golestan province, Iran.

== Demographics ==
=== Population ===
At the time of the 2006 National Census, the village's population was 238 in 61 households. The following census in 2011 counted 103 people in 36 households. The 2016 census measured the population of the village as 304 people in 98 households.
