= Sangestan, Golestan =

Village in Golestan province, Iran

Sangestan Persian: سنگستان
- Village
- Location within Iran
- Coordinates: 37°00′42″N 55°01′52″E
- Country: Iran
- Province: Golestan
- County: Ramian
- District: Fenderesk
- Rural District: Fenderesk-e Shomali

Population (2016)
  - Total: 379
- Time zone: UTC+3:30 (IRST)

Sangestan (Persian: سنگستان) (Note: Also romanized as Sangestān) is a village in Fenderesk-e Shomali Rural District of Fenderesk District in Ramian County, Golestan province, Iran.

== Demographics ==
=== Population ===
At the time of the 2006 National Census, the village's population was 417 in 116 households. The following census in 2011 counted 420 people in 127 households. The 2016 census measured the population of the village as 379 people in 123 households.
