= Mashu, Iran =

Village in Golestan province, Iran

Mashu Persian: مشو
- Village
- Location within Iran
- Coordinates: 36°58′00″N 54°59′00″E
- Country: Iran
- Province: Golestan
- County: Ramian
- District: Fenderesk
- Rural District: Fenderesk-e Jonubi

Population (2016)
  - Total: 159
- Time zone: UTC+3:30 (IRST)

Mashu (Persian: مشو) (Note: Also romanized as Mashū) is a village in Fenderesk-e Jonubi Rural District (Note: Formerly Fenderesk Rural District) of Fenderesk District in Ramian County, Golestan province, Iran.

== Demographics ==
=== Population ===
At the time of the 2006 National Census, the village's population was 146 in 37 households. The following census in 2011 counted 151 people in 43 households. The 2016 census measured the population of the village as 159 people in 49 households.
