= Turan, Iran =

Turan (Persian: طوران or توران) may refer to:

- Turan, Isfahan (طوران - Ţūrān)
- Turan-e Fars (توران - Tūrān), Golestan Province
- Turan-e Tork (توران - Tūrān), Golestan Province
