= Shirabad, Golestan =

Village in Golestan province, Iran

Shirabad Persian: شيرآباد
- Village
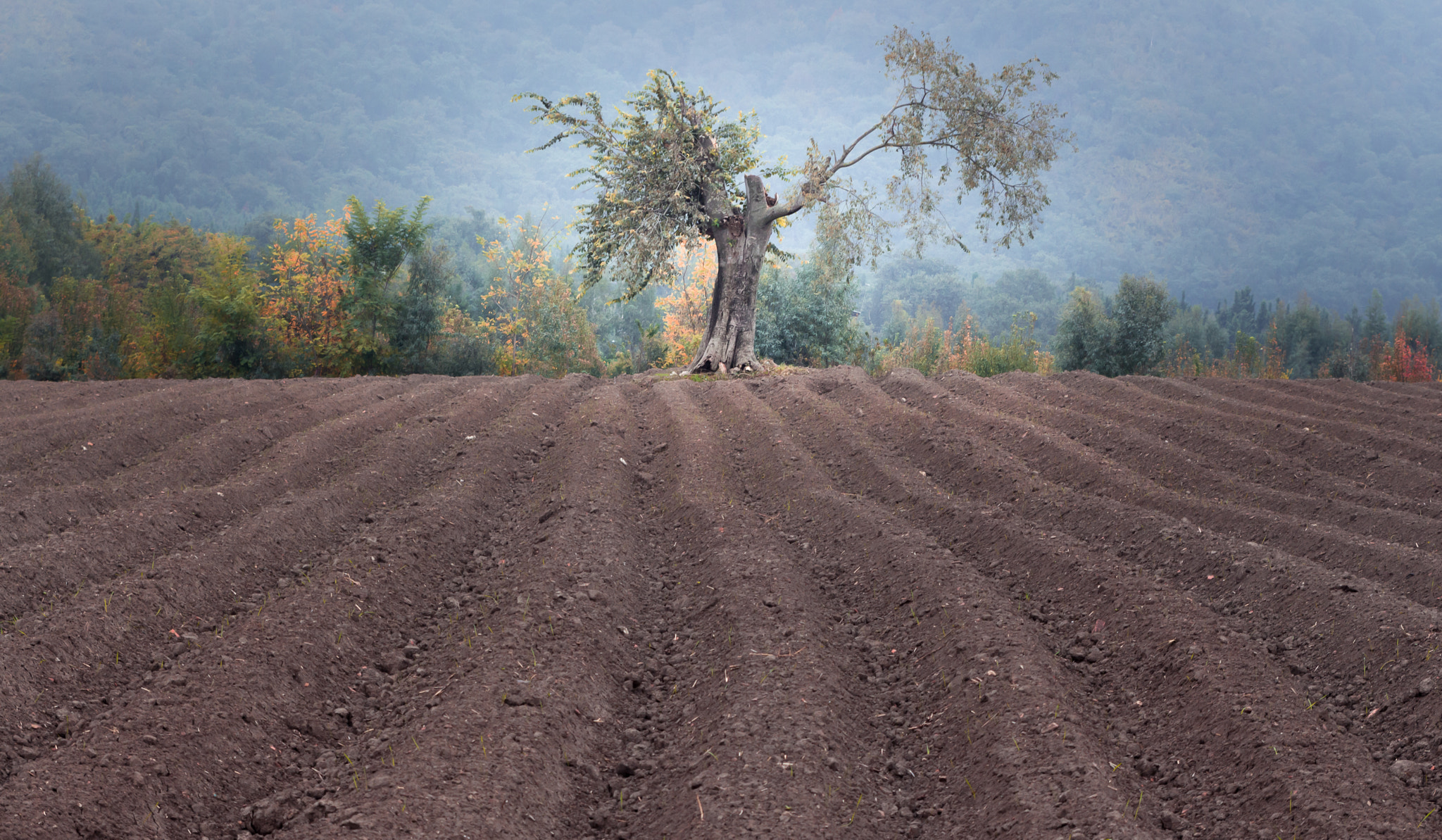

- Location within Iran
- Coordinates: 36°58′24″N 55°01′18″E
- Country: Iran
- Province: Golestan
- County: Ramian
- District: Fenderesk
- Rural District: Fenderesk-e Jonubi

Population (2016)
  - Total: 1,049
- Time zone: UTC+3:30 (IRST)

Shirabad (Persian: شيرآباد) (Note: Also romanized as Shīrābād) is a village in Fenderesk-e Jonubi Rural District (Note: Formerly Fenderesk Rural District) of Fenderesk District in Ramian County, Golestan province, Iran. It is in the Alborz (Elburz) mountain range. The Shir-Abad Waterfall is in the village.

== Demographics ==
=== Population ===
At the time of the 2006 National Census, the village's population was 893 in 230 households. The following census in 2011 counted 1,039 people in 313 households. The 2016 census measured the population of the village as 1,049 people in 322 households.
