= Hoseynabad-e Sistaniha =

Village in Golestan province, Iran

Hoseynabad-e Sistaniha Persian: حسين آباد سيستانيها
- Village
- Location within Iran
- Coordinates: 36°58′35″N 54°58′06″E
- Country: Iran
- Province: Golestan
- County: Ramian
- District: Fenderesk
- Rural District: Fenderesk-e Jonubi

Population (2016)
  - Total: 506
- Time zone: UTC+3:30 (IRST)

Hoseynabad-e Sistaniha (Persian: حسين آباد سيستانيها) (Note: Also romanized as Ḩoseynābād-e Sīstānīhā) is a village in Fenderesk-e Jonubi Rural District (Note: Formerly Fenderesk Rural District) of Fenderesk District in Ramian County, Golestan province, Iran.

== Demographics ==
=== Population ===
At the time of the 2006 National Census, the village's population was 665 in 157 households. The following census in 2011 counted 615 people in 173 households. The 2016 census measured the population of the village as 506 people in 158 households.
