= Abeh-ye Hajji Nazar =

Abeh-ye Hajji Nazar ابه حاجی نظر
- Village
- Location within Iran
- Coordinates: 37°05′28″N 55°06′26″E
- Country: Iran
- Province: Golestan
- County: Ramian
- Bakhsh: Central
- Rural District: Daland

Population (2016)
  - Total: 97
- Time zone: UTC+3:30 (IRST)

Abeh-ye Hajji Nazar (Persian: ابه حاجی نظر, also Romanized as Ābeh-ye Ḩājjī Naẓar; also known as Ḩājīnaẓar) is a village in Daland Rural District, in the Central District of Ramian County, Golestan Province, Iran.

At the time of the 2006 National Census, the village's population was 99 in 23 households. The following census in 2011 counted 99 people in 27 households. The 2016 census measured the population of the village as 97 people in 30 households.
