= Chaleh Polarz =

Chaleh Pelarz چاله پلرز
- Village
- Location within Iran
- Coordinates: 37°04′00″N 55°05′00″E
- Country: Iran
- Province: Golestan
- County: Ramian
- Bakhsh: Central
- Rural District: Daland

Population (2016)
  - Total: 229
- Time zone: UTC+3:30 (IRST)

Chaleh Polarz (Persian: چاله پلرز, also Romanized as Chāleh Polarz) is a village in Daland Rural District, in the Central District of Ramian County, Golestan Province, Iran.

At the time of the 2006 National Census, the village's population was 222 in 56 households. The following census in 2011 counted 212 people in 57 households. The 2016 census measured the population of the village as 229 people in 71 households.
