= Emamiyeh, Golestan =

Village in Golestan province, Iran

Emamiyeh Persian: اماميه
- Village
- Location within Iran
- Coordinates: 36°59′12″N 54°58′26″E
- Country: Iran
- Province: Golestan
- County: Ramian
- District: Fenderesk
- Rural District: Fenderesk-e Jonubi

Population (2016)
  - Total: 327
- Time zone: UTC+3:30 (IRST)

Emamiyeh (Persian: اماميه) (Note: Also romanized as Emāmīyeh) is a village in Fenderesk-e Jonubi Rural District (Note: Formerly Fenderesk Rural District) of Fenderesk District in Ramian County, Golestan province, Iran.

== Demographics ==
=== Population ===
At the time of the 2006 National Census, the village's population was 325 in 72 households. The following census in 2011 counted 354 people in 99 households. The 2016 census measured the population of the village as 327 people in 103 households.
