= Mohammadabad, Ramian =

Village in Golestan province, Iran

Mohammadabad Persian: محمدآباد
- Village
- Location within Iran
- Coordinates: 37°00′12″N 55°00′23″E
- Country: Iran
- Province: Golestan
- County: Ramian
- District: Fenderesk
- Rural District: Fenderesk-e Shomali

Population (2016)
  - Total: 164
- Time zone: UTC+3:30 (IRST)

Mohammadabad (Persian: محمدآباد) (Note: Also romanized as Moḩammadābād) is a village in Fenderesk-e Shomali Rural District of Fenderesk District in Ramian County, Golestan province, Iran.

== Demographics ==
=== Population ===
At the time of the 2006 National Census, the village's population was 230 in 54 households. The following census in 2011 counted 225 people in 61 households. The 2016 census measured the population of the village as 164 people in 48 households.
