= Sazeman-e Seyd Ahmad Khomeyni =

Sazeman-e Seyed Ahmad Khomeyni سازمان سيداحمد خمينی
- Village
- Location within Iran
- Coordinates: 37°03′39″N 54°58′32″E
- Country: Iran
- Province: Golestan
- County: Ramian
- Bakhsh: Central
- Rural District: Daland

Population (2016)
  - Total: 254
- Time zone: UTC+3:30 (IRST)

Sazeman-e Seyyed Ahmad Khomeyni (Persian: سازمان سيداحمد خمينی, also Romanized as Sāzemān-e Seyd Aḩmad Khomeynī; also known as Seyyedaḩmad-e Khomeynī) is a village in Daland Rural District, in the Central District of Ramian County, Golestan Province, Iran.

At the time of the 2006 National Census, the village's population was 245 in 64 households. The following census in 2011 counted 250 people in 74 households. The 2016 census measured the population of the village as 254 people in 76 households.
