= Baqerabad, Ramian =

Village in Golestan province, Iran

Baqerabad Persian: باقر آباد
- Village
- Location within Iran
- Coordinates: 36°57′18″N 55°06′56″E
- Country: Iran
- Province: Golestan
- County: Ramian
- District: Central
- Rural District: Qaleh Miran

Population (2016)
  - Total: 437
- Time zone: UTC+3:30 (IRST)

Baqerabad (Persian: باقرآباد) (Note: Also romanized as Bāqerābād) is a village in, and the capital of, Qaleh Miran Rural District in the Central District of Ramian County, Golestan province, Iran.

== Demographics ==
=== Population ===
At the time of the 2006 National Census, the village's population was 246 in 67 households. The following census in 2011 counted 254 people in 76 households. The 2016 census measured the population of the village as 437 people in 135 households.
