= Zeynababad =

Village in Golestan province, Iran

Zeynababad Persian: زينب اباد
- Village
- Location within Iran
- Coordinates: 37°04′10″N 55°08′21″E
- Country: Iran
- Province: Golestan
- County: Ramian
- District: Central
- Rural District: Daland

Population (2016)
  - Total: 3,868
- Time zone: UTC+3:30 (IRST)

Zeynababad (Persian: زينب اباد) (Note: Also romanized as Zeynabābād; also known as Zeynābād and Reynābād) is a village in Daland Rural District of the Central District in Ramian County, Golestan province, Iran.

== Demographics ==
=== Population ===
At the time of the 2006 National Census, the village's population was 3,574 in 886 households. The following census in 2011 counted 3,956 people in 1,122 households. The 2016 census measured the population of the village as 3,868 people in 1,200 households. It was the most populous village in its rural district.
