= Keshkak, Golestan =

Village in Golestan province, Iran

Keshkak Persian: کشکک
- Village
- Location within Iran
- Coordinates: 36°54′45″N 55°13′25″E
- Country: Iran
- Province: Golestan
- County: Ramian
- District: Central
- Rural District: Qaleh Miran

Population (2016)
  - Total: 794
- Time zone: UTC+3:30 (IRST)

Keshkak (Persian: کشکک) (Note: Also known as Keshgak and Keshkag) is a village in Qaleh Miran Rural District of the Central District in Ramian County, Golestan province, Iran.

== Demographics ==
=== Population ===
At the time of the 2006 National Census, the village's population was 740 in 160 households. The following census in 2011 counted 858 people in 229 households. The 2016 census measured the population of the village as 794 people in 222 households.
