= Araz Gol =

Village in Golestan province, Iran

Araz Gol Persian: ارازگل
- Village
- Location within Iran
- Coordinates: 37°02′23″N 54°55′10″E
- Country: Iran
- Province: Golestan
- County: Ramian
- District: Fenderesk
- Rural District: Fenderesk-e Shomali

Population (2016)
  - Total: 1,524
- Time zone: UTC+3:30 (IRST)

Araz Gol (Persian: ارازگل) (Note: Also romanized as Arāz Gol) is a village in Fenderesk-e Shomali Rural District of Fenderesk District in Ramian County, Golestan province, Iran.

== Demographics ==
=== Population ===
At the time of the 2006 National Census, the village's population was 1,601 in 376 households. The following census in 2011 counted 1,556 people in 409 households. The 2016 census measured the population of the village as 1,524 people in 423 households.
