= Shirabad Cave =

Shirabad Cave is located in the direction of Shirabad-waterfall in Khanbebin. It is a natural cave in Gorgan province, Fenderesk, Khanbehbin.
