= Sar Tappeh, Golestan =

Sar Tappeh سرتپه
- Village
- Location within Iran
- Coordinates: 37°05′43″N 55°08′18″E
- Country: Iran
- Province: Golestan
- County: Ramian
- Bakhsh: Central
- Rural District: Daland

Population (2016)
  - Total: 259
- Time zone: UTC+3:30 (IRST)

Sar Tappeh (Persian: سرتپه) is a village in Daland Rural District, in the Central District of Ramian County, Golestan Province, Iran.

At the time of the 2006 National Census, the village's population was 254 in 61 households. The following census in 2011 counted 275 people in 74 households. The 2016 census measured the population of the village as 259 people in 66 households.
