= Alhadi =

Village in Golestan province, Iran

Alhadi Persian: الهادی
- Village
- Location within Iran
- Coordinates: 36°56′10″N 55°09′23″E
- Country: Iran
- Province: Golestan
- County: Ramian
- District: Central
- Rural District: Qaleh Miran

Population (2016)
  - Total: 146
- Time zone: UTC+3:30 (IRST)

Alhadi (Persian: الهادی) (Note: Also romanized as Alhādī) is a village in Qaleh Miran Rural District of the Central District in Ramian County, Golestan province, Iran.

== Demographics ==
=== Population ===
At the time of the 2006 National Census, the village's population was 74 in 17 households. The following census in 2011 counted 67 people in 22 households. The 2016 census measured the population of the village as 146 people in 48 households.
