= Sefid Cheshmeh =

Village in Golestan province, Iran

Sefid Cheshmeh Persian: سفيدچشمه
- Village
- Location within Iran
- Coordinates: 36°59′48″N 55°03′54″E
- Country: Iran
- Province: Golestan
- County: Ramian
- District: Central
- Rural District: Daland

Population (2016)
  - Total: 575
- Time zone: UTC+3:30 (IRST)

Sefid Cheshmeh (Persian: سفيدچشمه) (Note: Also romanized as Sefīd Cheshmeh) is a village in Daland Rural District of the Central District in Ramian County, Golestan province, Iran.

== Demographics ==
=== Population ===
At the time of the 2006 National Census, the village's population was 489 in 115 households. The following census in 2011 counted 473 people in 136 households. The 2016 census measured the population of the village as 575 people in 175 households.
