= Tatar-e Sofla, Golestan =

Village in Golestan province, Iran

Tatar-e Sofla Persian: تاتارسفلي
- Village
- Location within Iran
- Coordinates: 37°05′01″N 54°59′58″E
- Country: Iran
- Province: Golestan
- County: Ramian
- District: Central
- Rural District: Daland

Population (2016)
  - Total: 2,094
- Time zone: UTC+3:30 (IRST)

Tatar-e Sofla (Persian: تاتارسفلي) (Note: Also romanized as Tātār-e Soflá; also known as Nātār-e Pā’īn and Tātār-e Pā’īn) is a village in Daland Rural District of the Central District in Ramian County, Golestan province, Iran.

== Demographics ==
=== Population ===
At the time of the 2006 National Census, the village's population was 1,759 in 314 households. The following census in 2011 counted 2,033 people in 490 households. The 2016 census measured the population of the village as 2,094 people in 543 households.
