= Towhidabad, Golestan =

Towhidabad توحيدآباد
- Village
- Location within Iran
- Coordinates: 37°21′00″N 55°29′00″E
- Country: Iran
- Province: Golestan
- County: Ramian
- Bakhsh: Central
- Rural District: Daland

Population (2016)
  - Total: 176
- Time zone: UTC+3:30 (IRST)

Towhidabad (Persian: توحيدآباد, also Romanized as Towḩīdābād; also known as Towḩīd) is a village in Daland Rural District, in the Central District of Ramian County, Golestan Province, Iran.

At the time of the 2006 National Census, the village's population was 171 in 36 households. The following census in 2011 counted 170 people in 35 households. The 2016 census measured the population of the village as 176 people in 46 households.
