= Jowzchal =

Village in Golestan province, Iran

Jowzchal Persian: جوزچال
- Village
- Location within Iran
- Coordinates: 36°51′35″N 55°11′25″E
- Country: Iran
- Province: Golestan
- County: Ramian
- District: Central
- Rural District: Qaleh Miran

Population (2016)
  - Total: 82
- Time zone: UTC+3:30 (IRST)

Jowzchal (Persian: جوزچال) (Note: Also romanized as Jowzchāl; also known as Jozchāl) is a village in Qaleh Miran Rural District of the Central District in Ramian County, Golestan province, Iran.

== Demographics ==
=== Population ===
At the time of the 2006 National Census, the village's population was 39 in eight households. The following census in 2011 counted 66 people in 22 households. The 2016 census measured the population of the village as 82 people in 23 households.
