= Maziaran =

Village in Golestan province, Iran

Maziaran Persian: مازياران
- Village
- Location within Iran
- Coordinates: 36°56′01″N 54°56′26″E
- Country: Iran
- Province: Golestan
- County: Ramian
- District: Fenderesk
- Rural District: Fenderesk-e Jonubi

Population (2016)
  - Total: 663
- Time zone: UTC+3:30 (IRST)

Maziaran (Persian: مازياران) (Note: Also romanized as Māzīārān) is a village in Fenderesk-e Jonubi Rural District (Note: Formerly Fenderesk Rural District) of Fenderesk District in Ramian County, Golestan province, Iran.

== Demographics ==
=== Population ===
At the time of the 2006 National Census, the village's population was 648 in 178 households. The following census in 2011 counted 701 people in 217 households. The 2016 census measured the population of the village as 663 people in 217 households.
