= Laleh Bagh =

Village in Golestan province, Iran

Laleh Bagh Persian: لاله باغ
- Village
- Location within Iran
- Coordinates: 37°01′40″N 54°56′11″E
- Country: Iran
- Province: Golestan
- County: Ramian
- District: Fenderesk
- Rural District: Fenderesk-e Shomali

Population (2016)
  - Total: 960
- Time zone: UTC+3:30 (IRST)

Laleh Bagh (Persian: لاله باغ) (Note: Also romanized as Lāleh Bāgh) is a village in Fenderesk-e Shomali Rural District of Fenderesk District in Ramian County, Golestan province, Iran.

== Demographics ==
=== Population ===
At the time of the 2006 National Census, the village's population was 942 in 230 households. The following census in 2011 counted 976 people in 291 households. The 2016 census measured the population of the village as 960 people in 304 households.
