= Jafarabad-e Namtalu =

Village in Golestan province, Iran

Jafarabad-e Namtalu Persian: جعفرآباد نامتلو
- Village
- Location within Iran
- Coordinates: 36°58′45″N 54°58′03″E
- Country: Iran
- Province: Golestan
- County: Ramian
- District: Fenderesk
- Rural District: Fenderesk-e Jonubi

Population (2016)
  - Total: 961
- Time zone: UTC+3:30 (IRST)

Jafarabad-e Namtalu (Persian: جعفرآباد نامتلو) (Note: Also romanized as Ja‘farābād-e Nāmtalū) is a village in Fenderesk-e Jonubi Rural District (Note: Formerly Fenderesk Rural District) of Fenderesk District in Ramian County, Golestan province, Iran.

== Demographics ==
=== Population ===
At the time of the 2006 National Census, the village's population was 985 in 247 households. The following census in 2011 counted 972 people in 271 households. The 2016 census measured the population of the village as 961 people in 297 households.
