= Viru, Iran =

Village in Golestan province, Iran

Viru Persian: ويرو
- Village
- Location within Iran
- Coordinates: 36°55′45″N 55°12′06″E
- Country: Iran
- Province: Golestan
- County: Ramian
- District: Central
- Rural District: Qaleh Miran

Population (2016)
  - Total: 815
- Time zone: UTC+3:30 (IRST)

Viru (Persian: ويرو) (Note: Also romanized as Vīrū) is a village in Qaleh Miran Rural District of the Central District in Ramian County, Golestan province, Iran.

== Demographics ==
=== Population ===
At the time of the 2006 National Census, the village's population was 762 in 175 households. The following census in 2011 counted 914 people in 223 households. The 2016 census measured the population of the village as 815 people in 225 households. It was the most populous village in its rural district.
