= Baluchabad, Ramian =

Village in Golestan province, Iran

Baluchabad Persian: بلوچ آباد
- Village
- Location within Iran
- Coordinates: 36°57′16″N 54°56′16″E
- Country: Iran
- Province: Golestan
- County: Ramian
- District: Fenderesk
- Rural District: Fenderesk-e Jonubi

Population (2016)
  - Total: 2,341
- Time zone: UTC+3:30 (IRST)

Baluchabad (Persian: بلوچ آباد) (Note: Also romanized as Balūchābād; also known as Balūchābād-e Sīāh Khān) is a village in Fenderesk-e Jonubi Rural District (Note: Formerly Fenderesk Rural District) of Fenderesk District in Ramian County, Golestan province, Iran.

== Demographics ==
=== Population ===
At the time of the 2006 National Census, the village's population was 2,138 in 437 households. The following census in 2011 counted 2,290 people in 596 households. The 2016 census measured the population of the village as 2,341 people in 639 households.
