= Gardayesh-e Baluchabad =

Village in Golestan province, Iran

Gardayesh-e Baluchabad Persian: گردايش بلوچ آباد
- Village
- Location within Iran
- Coordinates: 36.961°N 54.944°E
- Country: Iran
- Province: Golestan
- County: Ramian
- District: Fenderesk
- Rural District: Fenderesk-e Jonubi

Population (2016)
  - Total: 2,452
- Time zone: UTC+3:30 (IRST)

Gardayesh-e Baluchabad (Persian: گردايش بلوچ آباد) (Note: Also romanized as Gardāyesh-e Balūchābād; also known as Balūchābād-e Gardāyesh) is a village in Fenderesk-e Jonubi Rural District (Note: Formerly Fenderesk Rural District) of Fenderesk District in Ramian County, Golestan province, Iran.

== Demographics ==
=== Population ===
At the time of the 2006 National Census, the village's population was 3,418 in 725 households. The following census in 2011 counted 3,449 people in 897 households. The 2016 census measured the population of the village as 2,452 people in 628 households.
