= Qarah Qach, Golestan =

Village in Golestan province, Iran

Qarah Qach Persian: قره قاچ
- Village
- Location within Iran
- Coordinates: 37°03′50″N 55°07′28″E
- Country: Iran
- Province: Golestan
- County: Ramian
- District: Central
- Rural District: Daland

Population (2016)
  - Total: 1,914
- Time zone: UTC+3:30 (IRST)

Qarah Qach (Persian: قره قاچ) (Note: Also romanized as Qarah Qāch and Qareh Qāch; also known as Qarah Qāj, Qaragaj, and Qareh Qāj) is a village in Daland Rural District of the Central District in Ramian County, Golestan province, Iran.

== Demographics ==
=== Population ===
At the time of the 2006 National Census, the village's population was 2,190 in 533 households. The following census in 2011 counted 2,128 people in 558 households. The 2016 census measured the population of the village as 1,914 people in 576 households.
