= Seyyed Kalateh =

Village in Golestan province, Iran

Seyyed Kalateh Persian: سيدكلاته
- Village
- Location within Iran
- Coordinates: 36°57′20″N 55°06′34″E
- Country: Iran
- Province: Golestan
- County: Ramian
- District: Central
- Rural District: Qaleh Miran

Population (2016)
  - Total: 203
- Time zone: UTC+3:30 (IRST)

Seyyed Kalateh (Persian: سيدكلاته) (Note: Also romanized as Seyyed Kalāteh; also known as Sadd-e Kalāteh, Saiyid Qal‘eh, and Seyl Kalā) is a village in Qaleh Miran Rural District of the Central District in Ramian County, Golestan province, Iran.

== Demographics ==
=== Population ===
At the time of the 2006 National Census, the village's population was 232 in 47 households. The following census in 2011 counted 139 people in 41 households. The 2016 census measured the population of the village as 203 people in 66 households.
