= Naqiabad, Golestan =

Village in Golestan province, Iran

Naqiabad Persian: نقی آباد
- Village
- Location within Iran
- Coordinates: 36°57′07″N 54°57′41″E
- Country: Iran
- Province: Golestan
- County: Ramian
- District: Fenderesk
- Rural District: Fenderesk-e Jonubi

Population (2016)
  - Total: 664
- Time zone: UTC+3:30 (IRST)

Naqiabad (Persian: نقی آباد) (Note: Also romanized as Naqīābād) is a village in Fenderesk-e Jonubi Rural District (Note: Formerly Fenderesk Rural District) of Fenderesk District in Ramian County, Golestan province, Iran.

== Demographics ==
=== Population ===
At the time of the 2006 National Census, the village's population was 626 in 156 households. The following census in 2011 counted 658 people in 195 households. The 2016 census measured the population of the village as 664 people in 219 households.
