= Okhli-ye Pain =

Okhli-ye Pain اوخلی پائين
- Village
- Location within Iran
- Coordinates: 37°06′25″N 55°04′34″E
- Country: Iran
- Province: Golestan
- County: Ramian
- Bakhsh: Central
- Rural District: Daland

Population (2016)
  - Total: 401
- Time zone: UTC+3:30 (IRST)

Okhli-ye Pain (Persian: اوخلی پائين, also Romanized as Okhlī-ye Pā’īn; also known as Okhlī-ye Paeen) is a village in Daland Rural District, in the Central District of Ramian County, Golestan Province, Iran.

At the time of the 2006 National Census, the village's population was 371 in 92 households. The following census in 2011 counted 347 people in 97 households. The 2016 census measured the population of the village as 401 people in 113 households.
