= Okhli-ye Bala =

Okhli-ye Bala اوخلی بالا
- Village
- Location within Iran
- Coordinates: 37°05′57″N 55°05′17″E
- Country: Iran
- Province: Golestan
- County: Ramian
- Bakhsh: Central
- Rural District: Daland

Population (2016)
  - Total: 370
- Time zone: UTC+3:30 (IRST)

Okhli-ye Bala (Persian: اوخلی بالا, also Romanized as Okhlī-ye Bālā) is a village in Daland Rural District, in the Central District of Ramian County, Golestan Province, Iran.

At the time of the 2006 National Census, the village's population was 348 in 82 households. The following census in 2011 counted 373 people in 98 households. The 2016 census measured the population of the village as 370 people in 102 households.
