= Qur Chay, Ramian =

Village in Golestan province, Iran

Qur Chay Persian: قورچای
- Village
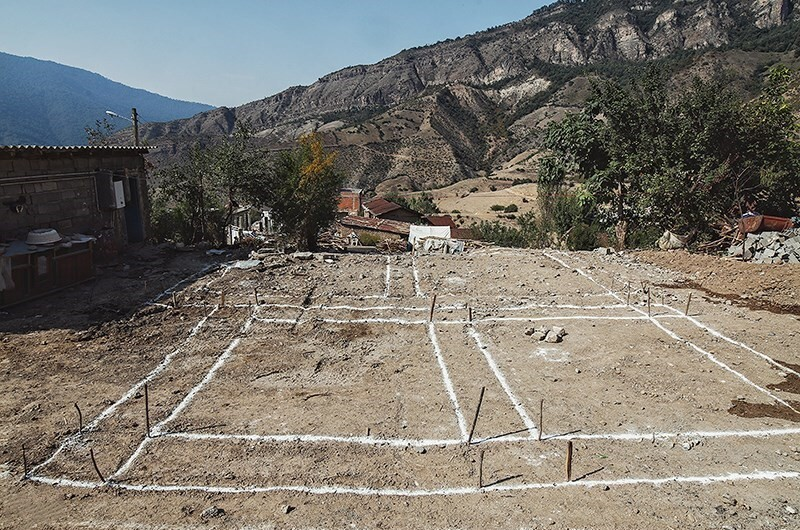
- The village of Qur Chay after an earthquake

- Location within Iran
- Coordinates: 36°56′52″N 55°08′32″E
- Country: Iran
- Province: Golestan
- County: Ramian
- District: Central
- Rural District: Qaleh Miran

Population (2016)
  - Total: 344
- Time zone: UTC+3:30 (IRST)

Qur Chay (Persian: قورچای) (Note: Also romanized as Qūr Chāy) is a village in Qaleh Miran Rural District of the Central District in Ramian County, Golestan province, Iran. Qur Chay was struck by an earthquake in October 2021, destroying and damaging houses.

== Demographics ==
=== Population ===
At the time of the 2006 National Census, the village's population was 328 in 83 households. The following census in 2011 counted 324 people in 92 households. The 2016 census measured the population of the village as 344 people in 102 households.
