= Turan-e Tork =

Village in Golestan province, Iran

Turan-e Tork Persian: توران ترك
- Village
- Location within Iran
- Coordinates: 37°04′57″N 55°06′11″E
- Country: Iran
- Province: Golestan
- County: Ramian
- District: Central
- Rural District: Daland

Population (2016)
  - Total: 1,070
- Time zone: UTC+3:30 (IRST)

Turan-e Tork (Persian: توران ترك) (Note: Also romanized as Tūrān-e Tork; also known as Tūrān) is a village in Daland Rural District of the Central District in Ramian County, Golestan province, Iran.

== Demographics ==
=== Population ===
At the time of the 2006 National Census, the village's population was 1,146 in 265 households. The following census in 2011 counted 1,182 people in 311 households. The 2016 census measured the population of the village as 1,070 people in 322 households.
