= Tarq =

Tarq (Persian: طرق) may refer to:

- Taroq
- Tarq, Isfahan
- Toroq (disambiguation)
