= Qurchay =

Qurchay or Qur Chay (Persian: قورچاي) may refer to:

- Qurchay, Azadshahr
- Qur Chay, Ramian
