= Okhli-ye Forugah Farahnak =

Okhli-ye Forugah Farahnak اوخلی فروگاه فرهناک
- Village
- Location within Iran
- Coordinates: 37°05′37″N 55°05′42″E
- Country: Iran
- Province: Golestan
- County: Ramian
- Bakhsh: Central
- Rural District: Daland

Population (2016)
  - Total: 295
- Time zone: UTC+3:30 (IRST)

Okhli-ye Forugah Farahnak (Persian: اوخلی فروگاه فرهناک, also Romanized as Okhlī-ye Forūgāh Farahnāḵ; also known as Okhlī-ye Forūdgāh) is a village in Daland Rural District, in the Central District of Ramian County, Golestan Province, Iran.

At the time of the 2006 National Census, the village's population was 330 in 87 households. The following census in 2011 counted 353 people in 102 households. The 2016 census measured the population of the village as 295 people in 91 households.
