= Baluchabad-e Mashu =

Village in Golestan province, Iran

Baluchabad-e Mashu Persian: بلوچ آباد مشو
- Village
- Location within Iran
- Coordinates: 36°58′30″N 54°57′43″E
- Country: Iran
- Province: Golestan
- County: Ramian
- District: Fenderesk
- Rural District: Fenderesk-e Jonubi

Population (2016)
  - Total: 1,236
- Time zone: UTC+3:30 (IRST)

Baluchabad-e Mashu (Persian: بلوچ آباد مشو) (Note: Also romanized as Balūchābād-e Mashū) is a village in Fenderesk-e Jonubi Rural District (Note: Formerly Fenderesk Rural District) of Fenderesk District in Ramian County, Golestan province, Iran.

== Demographics ==
=== Population ===
At the time of the 2006 National Census, the village's population was 1,025 in 219 households. The following census in 2011 counted 1,199 people in 294 households. The 2016 census measured the population of the village as 1,236 people in 330 households.
