= Ramian =

City in Golestan province, Iran

Ramian Persian: رامیان
- City
- Location within Iran
- Coordinates: 37°00′53″N 55°08′26″E
- Country: Iran
- Province: Golestan
- County: Ramian
- District: Central

Population (2016)
  - Total: 12,426
- Time zone: UTC+3:30 (IRST)

Ramian (Persian: رامیان) (Note: Also romanized as Rāmeyān, Rāmīān, and Rāmīyān) is a city in the Central District of Ramian County, Golestan province, Iran, serving as capital of both the county and the district.

== Demographics ==
=== Population ===
At the time of the 2006 National Census, the city's population was 11,719 in 2,831 households. The following census in 2011 counted 12,263 people in 3,408 households. The 2016 census measured the population of the city as 12,426 people in 3,772 households.

== See also ==
- Khorasani Turks
- Khorasani Turkish
