= Fenderesk-e Jonubi Rural District =

Rural district in Golestan province, Iran

Fenderesk-e Jonubi Rural District Persian: دهستان فندرسك جنوبي
- Rural District
- Location within Iran
- Coordinates: 36°55′N 54°58′E
- Country: Iran
- Province: Golestan
- County: Ramian
- District: Fenderesk
- Established: 1987
- Capital: Dar Kalateh

Population (2016)
  - Total: 18,435
- Time zone: UTC+3:30 (IRST)

Fenderesk-e Jonubi Rural District (Persian: دهستان فندرسك جنوبي) (Note: Formerly Fenderesk Rural District (دهستان فندرسك)) is in Fenderesk District of Ramian County, Golestan province, Iran. Its capital is the village of Dar Kalateh.

== Demographics ==
=== Population ===
At the time of the 2006 National Census, the rural district's population was 16,715 in 3,893 households. There were 17,858 inhabitants in 4,897 households at the following census of 2011. The 2016 census measured the population of the rural district as 18,435 in 5,263 households. The most populous of its 14 villages was Rezaabad, with 4,568 people.

=== Other villages in the rural district ===
- Baluchabad
- Baluchabad-e Mashu
- Emamiyeh
- Gardayesh-e Baluchabad
- Hoseynabad-e Sistaniha
- Hoseynabad-e Tappeh Sari
- Jafarabad-e Namtalu
- Mashu
- Maziaran
- Naqiabad
- Shafiabad
- Shirabad
