= Khan Bebin =

City in Golestan province, Iran

Khan Bebin Persian: خان ببين
- City
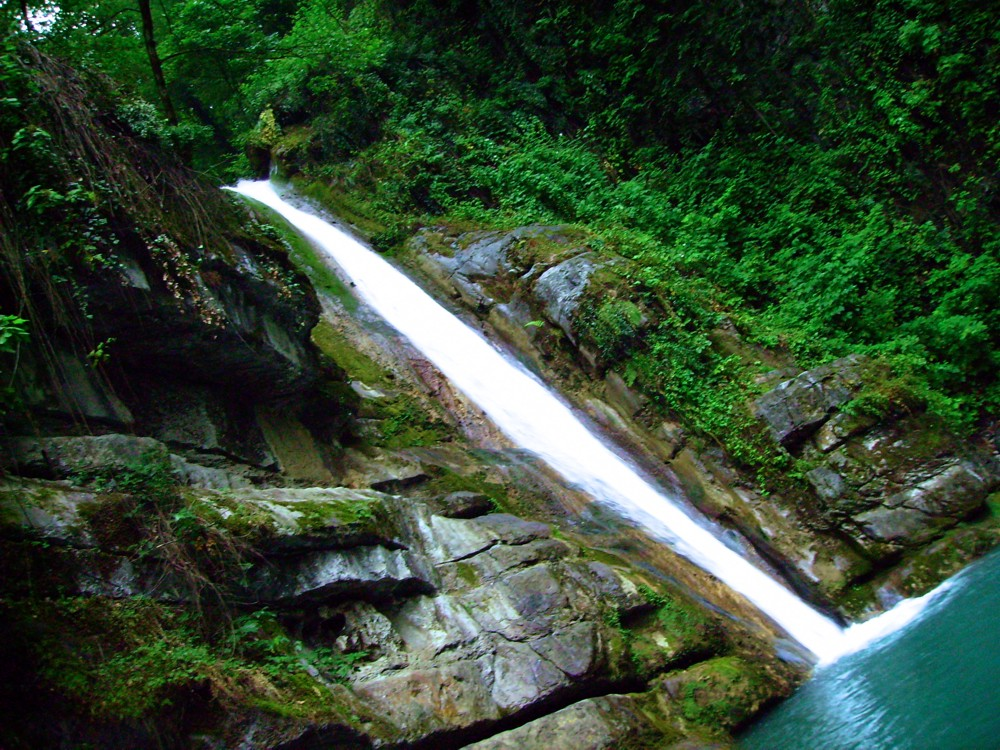

- Location within Iran
- Coordinates: 37°00′35″N 54°59′09″E
- Country: Iran
- Province: Golestan
- County: Ramian
- District: Fenderesk
- Elevation: 67 m (220 ft)

Population (2016)
  - Total: 10,878
- Time zone: UTC+3:30 (IRST)

Khan Bebin (Persian: خان ‌ببین) (Note: Also romanized as Khān Bebīn; also known as Khān Beben, Khān Behbīn, Khān Bīn, and Khanbeh Bon') is a city in, and the capital of, Fenderesk District in Ramian County, Golestan province, Iran. Central within the district, the city is close to Shir-Abad Waterfall.

== Demographics ==
=== Population ===
At the time of the 2006 National Census, the city's population was 10,435 in 2,561 households. The following census in 2011 counted 11,007 people in 3,098 households. The 2016 census measured the population of the city as 10,878 people in 3,328 households.
