= Daland Rural District =

Rural district in Golestan province, Iran

Daland Rural District Persian: دهستان دلند
- Rural District
- Location within Iran
- Coordinates: 37°04′N 55°04′E
- Country: Iran
- Province: Golestan
- County: Ramian
- District: Central
- Established: 1987
- Capital: Turan-e Fars

Population (2016)
  - Total: 20,754
- Time zone: UTC+3:30 (IRST)

Daland Rural District (Persian: دهستان دلند) is in the Central District of Ramian County, Golestan province, Iran. Its capital is the village of Turan-e Fars. The previous capital of the rural district was the city of Daland.

== Demographics ==
=== Population ===
At the time of the 2006 National Census, the rural district's population was 25,106 in 5,858 households. There were 25,660 inhabitants in 6,972 households at the following census of 2011. The 2016 census measured the population of the rural district as 20,754 in 6,188 households. The most populous of its 26 villages was Zeynababad, with 3,868 people.

=== Other villages in the rural district ===
- Abeh-ye Hajji Nazar
- Allahabad
- Chaleh Polarz
- Eslamabad-e Olya
- Eslamabad-e Sofla
- Fajr
- Galand
- Hoseynabad-e Qorbani
- Kalu
- Nar Kalateh
- Okhli-ye Bala
- Okhli-ye Forugah Farahnak
- Okhli-ye Pain
- Qarah Qach
- Sar Tappeh
- Sazeman-e Darya
- Sazeman-e Hajj Seyd
- Sazeman-e Miankaleh
- Sazeman-e Seyd Ahmad Khomeyni
- Sefid Cheshmeh
- Shahid Chamran
- Tatar-e Sofla
- Towhidabad
- Turan-e Fars
- Turan-e Tork
