= Tatar-e Olya, Golestan =

City in Golestan province, Iran

Tatar-e Olya Persian: تاتارعليا
- City
- Location within Iran
- Coordinates: 37°06′38″N 55°02′48″E
- Country: Iran
- Province: Golestan
- County: Ramian
- District: Central
- Established as a city: 2011

Population (2016)
  - Total: 4,782
- Time zone: UTC+3:30 (IRST)

Tatar-e Olya (Persian: تاتارعليا) (Note: Also romanized as Tātār-e ‘Olyā; also known as Ţāţār Bāyjeq, Tātār-e Bālā, and Ţāţār-e Bālā) is a city in the Central District of Ramian County, Golestan province, Iran.

== Demographics ==
=== Population ===
At the time of the 2006 National Census, Tatar-e Olya's population was 4,709 in 1,074 households, when it was a village in Daland Rural District. The following census in 2011 counted 4,785 people in 1,299 households. The 2016 census measured the population of the village as 4,782 people in 1,317 households, by which time Tatar-e Olya had been converted to a city.
