= Fenderesk-e Shomali Rural District =

Rural district in Golestan province, Iran

Fenderesk-e Shomali Rural District Persian: دهستان فندرسك شمالي
- Rural District
- Location within Iran
- Coordinates: 37°00′N 55°00′E
- Country: Iran
- Province: Golestan
- County: Ramian
- District: Fenderesk
- Established: 2001
- Capital: Sadabad-e Fenderesk

Population (2016)
  - Total: 7,159
- Time zone: UTC+3:30 (IRST)

Fenderesk-e Shomali Rural District (Persian: دهستان فندرسك شمالي) is in Fenderesk District of Ramian County, Golestan province, Iran. Its capital is the village of Sadabad-e Fenderesk.

== Demographics ==
=== Population ===
At the time of the 2006 National Census, the rural district's population was 7,176 in 1,752 households. There were 7,525 inhabitants in 2,143 households at the following census of 2011. The 2016 census measured the population of the rural district as 7,159 in 2,180 households. The most populous of its 10 villages was Sadabad-e Fenderesk, with 2,166 people.

=== Other villages in the rural district ===
- Araz Gol
- Azdari
- Cheqer
- Hemmatabad
- Laleh Bagh
- Mohammadabad
- Ney Tappeh
- Salman Farsi
- Sangestan
