= Toroq =

Toroq or Tarq (Persian: طرق) may refer to:

- Tarq, Isfahan
- Toroq, Kashmar, Razavi Khorasan Province
- Toroq, Mashhad, Razavi Khorasan Province
