= Qaleh Miran Rural District =

Rural district in Golestan province, Iran

Qaleh Miran Rural District Persian: دهستان قلعه ميران
- Rural District
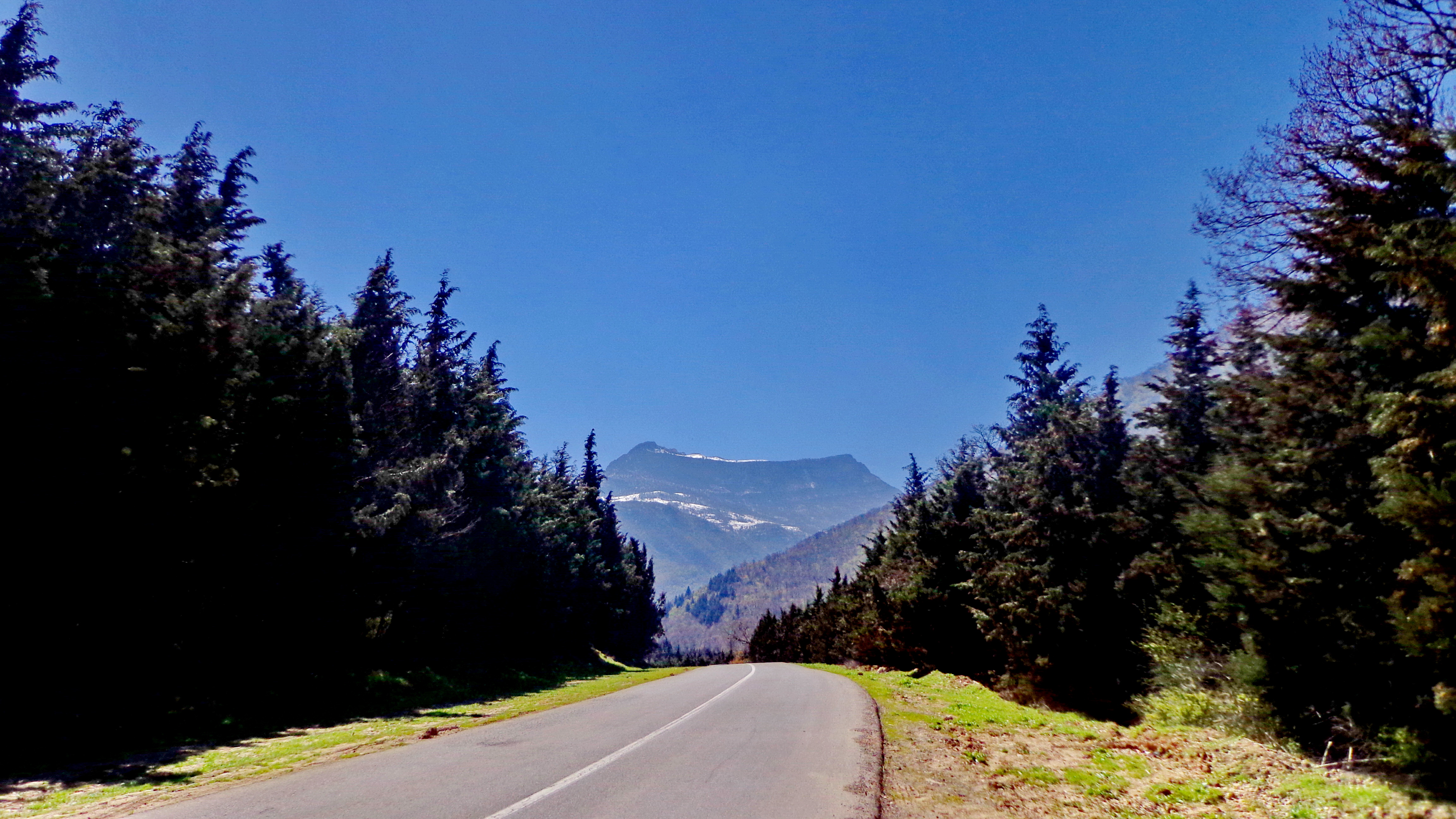
- Qaleh Miran Peak

- Location within Iran
- Coordinates: 36°54′N 55°08′E
- Country: Iran
- Province: Golestan
- County: Ramian
- District: Central
- Established: 1987
- Capital: Baqerabad

Population (2016)
  - Total: 3,591
- Time zone: UTC+3:30 (IRST)

Qaleh Miran Rural District (Persian: دهستان قلعه ميران) is in the Central District of Ramian County, Golestan province, Iran. Its capital is the village of Baqerabad.

The rural District was named after Qaleh Miran Mountain, also known as Qaleh Muran and Qaleh Maran, a 2,430 m (7,970 ft) tall mountain, with historical significance and also a famous natural sight.

== Demographics ==
=== Population ===
At the time of the 2006 National Census, the rural district's population was 2,983 in 703 households. There were 3,019 inhabitants in 853 households at the following census of 2011. The 2016 census measured the population of the rural district as 3,591 in 1,077 households. The most populous of its 17 villages was Viru, with 815 people.

=== Other villages in the rural district ===
- Alhadi
- Dozdak
- Jowzchal
- Keshkak
- Malech-e Aram
- Na'im Abad Mazraeh
- Pa Qaleh
- Pol-e Aram
- Qur Chay
- Rajan
- Razi
- Seyyed Kalateh
- Shesh Ab

== Gallery ==
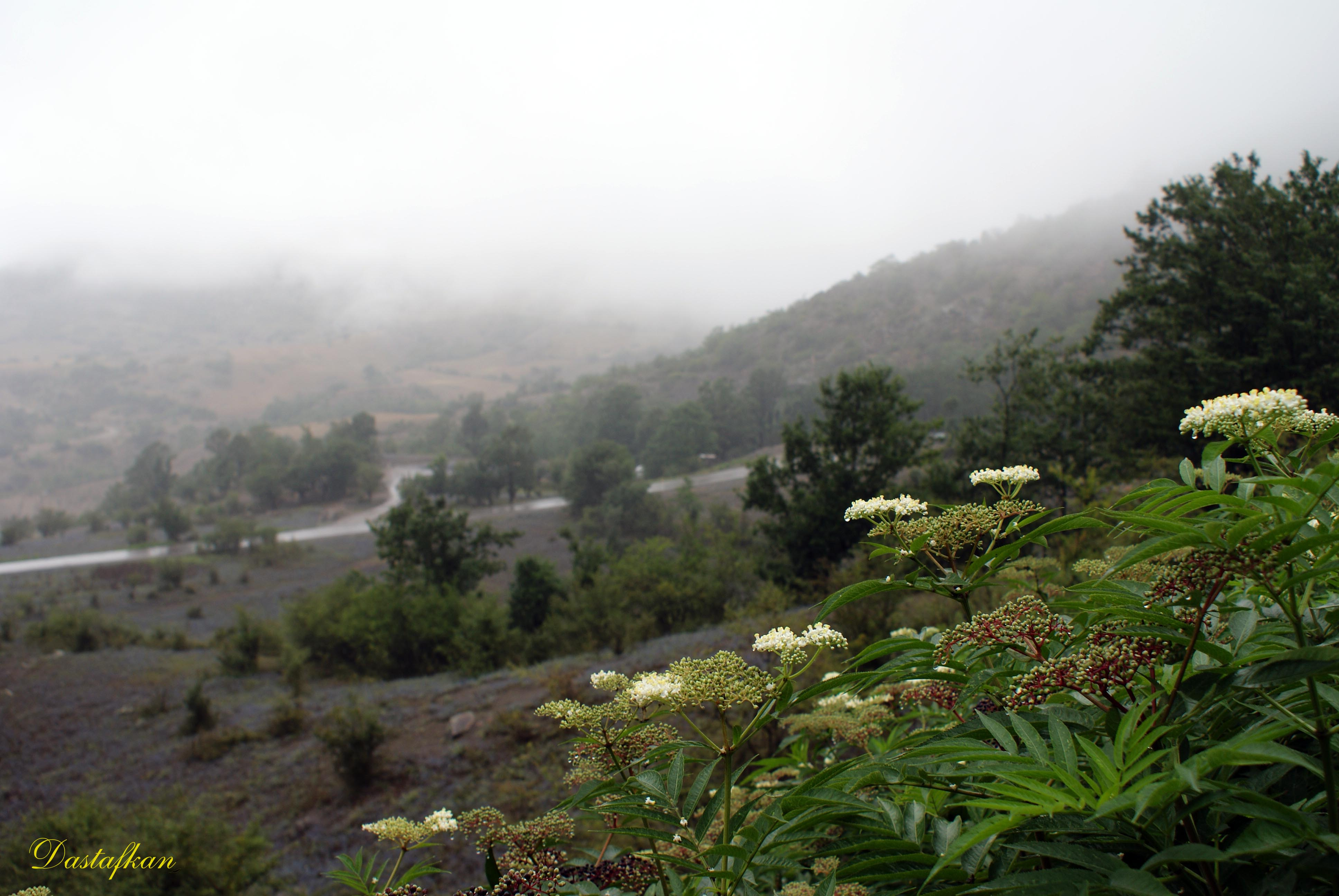
Olang Forest

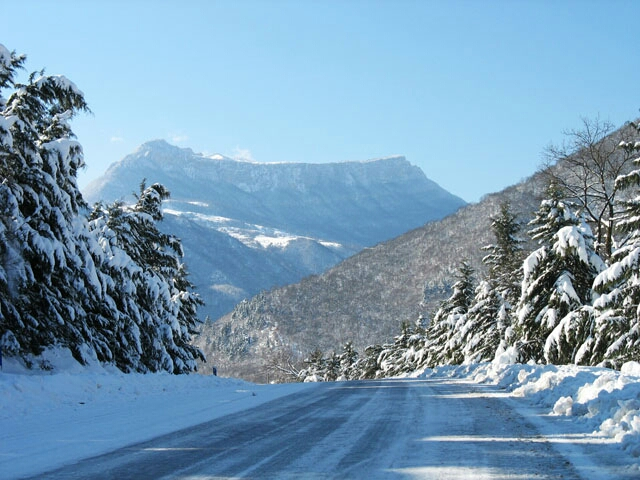
Qaleh Miran in Winter

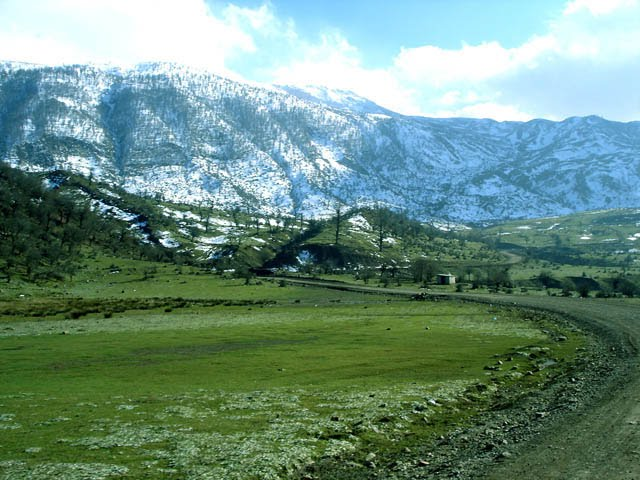
Ulang Mountains

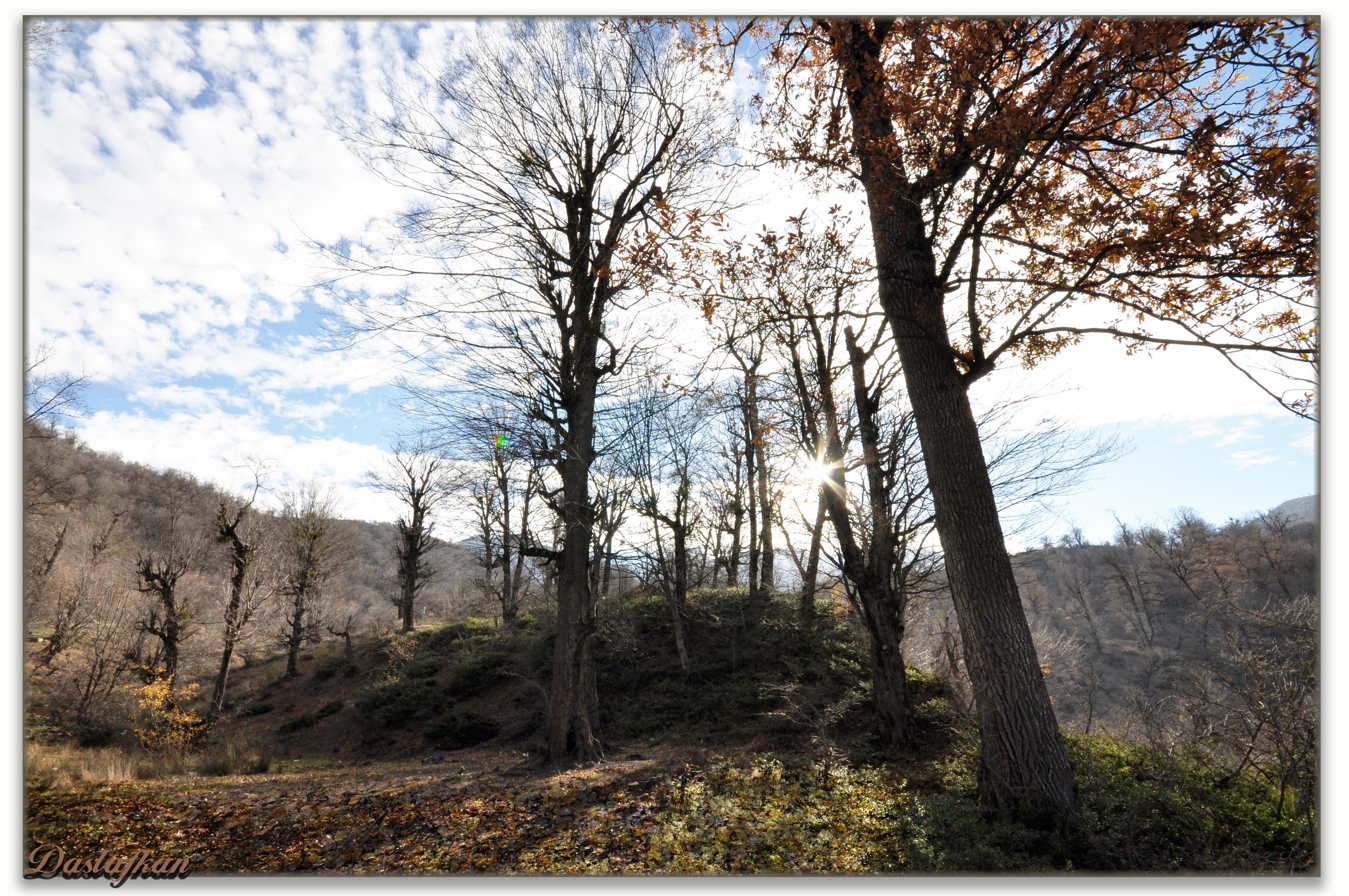

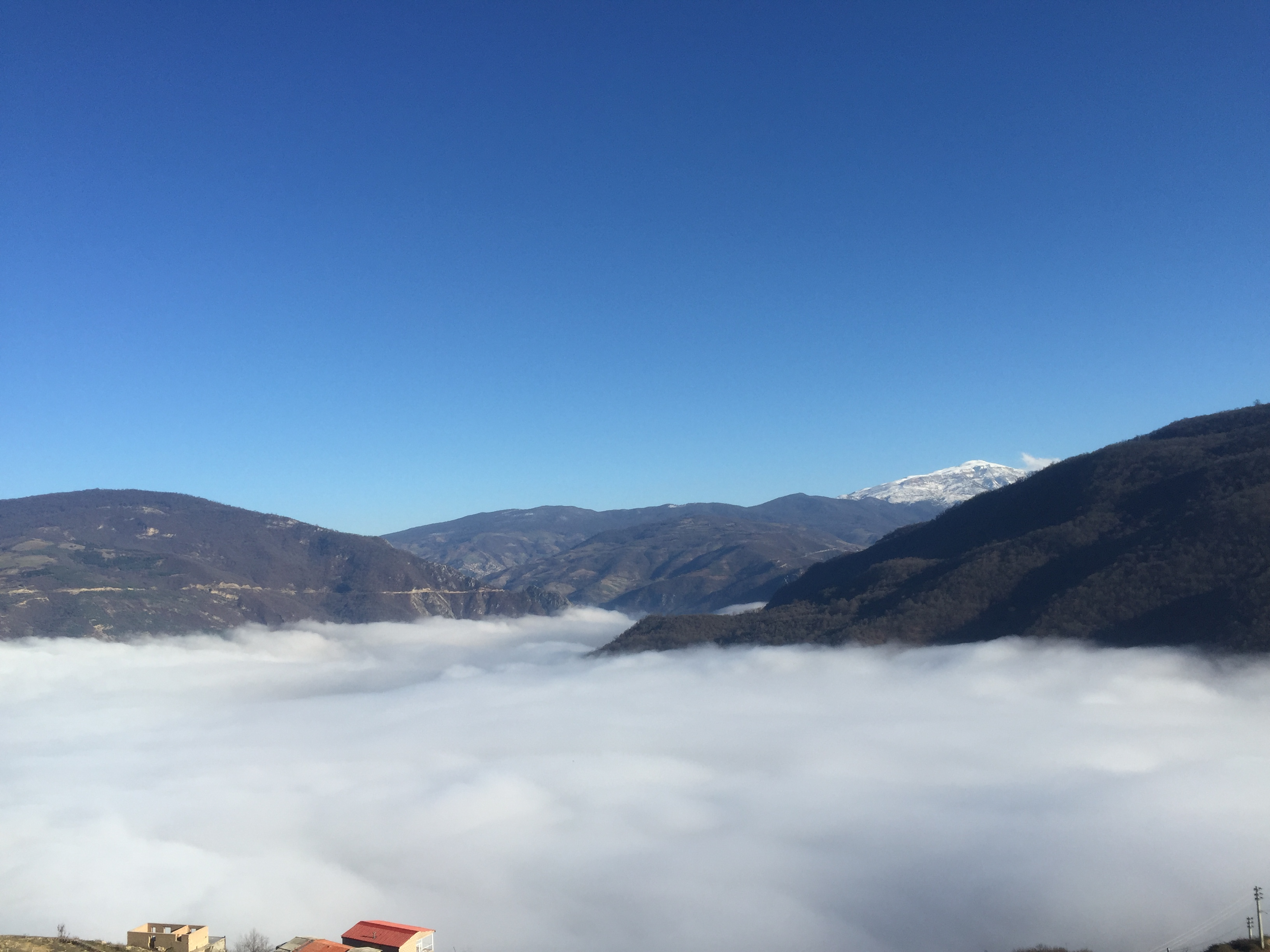
