= Shirabad Waterfall =

Coordinates: 36°58′21″N 55°01′31″E

- آبشار شیرآباد
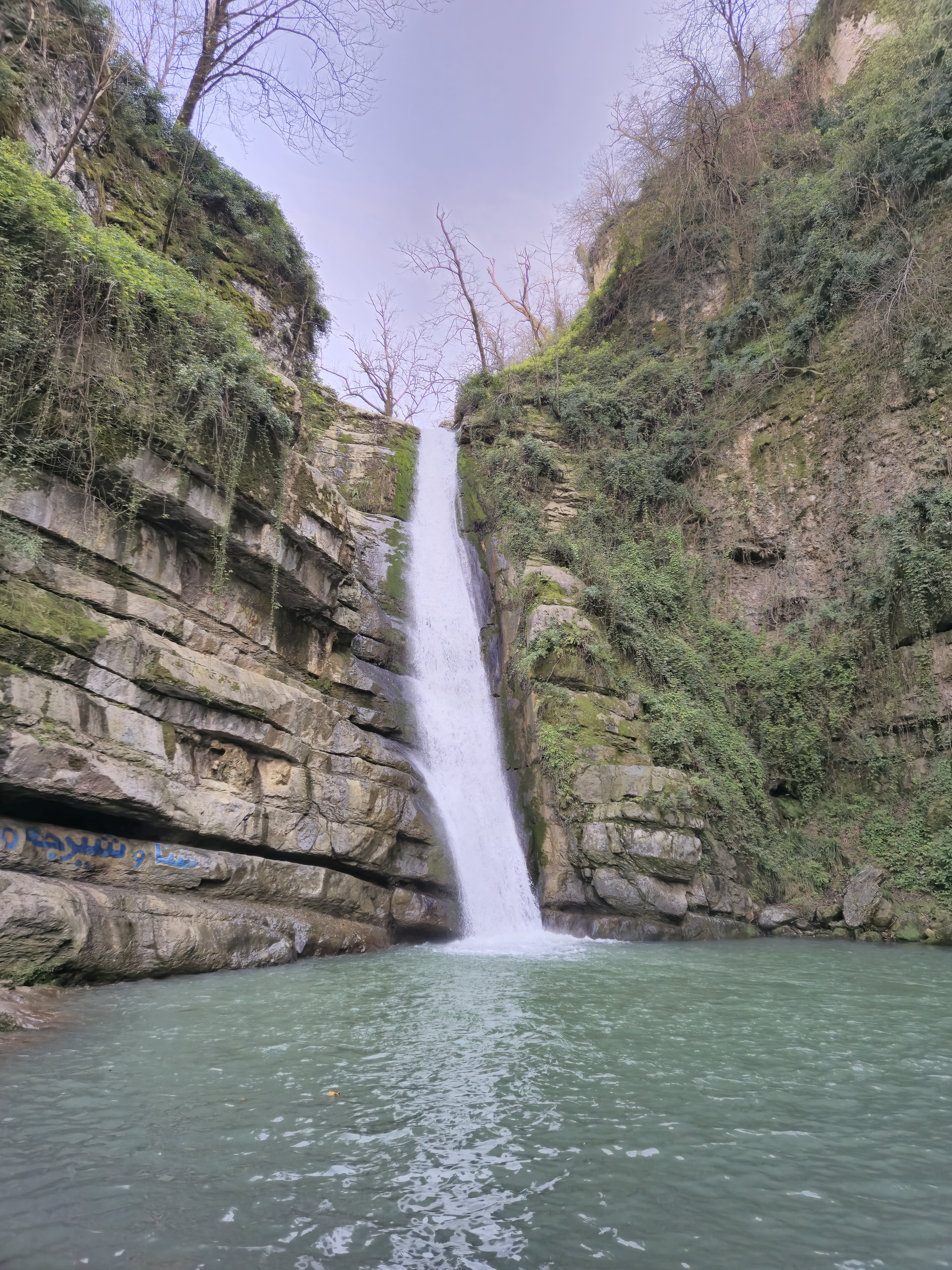
- Shirabad Waterfall in the Alborz mountain range
- Interactive map of Shirabad Waterfall
- Location: Shirabad, Fenderesk District, Ramian County, Golestan Province, Iran
- Longest drop: 30 metres (98 ft)

The Shirabad Waterfall (Persian: آبشار شیرآباد) is a waterfall in the Alborz mountain range, at the village of Shirabad in the Fenderesk District of Golestan Province, northern Iran.

== Description ==
Shirabad Waterfall is in the form of a stairway cascade and includes 12 large and small waterfall, the largest of which is over 30 m high.The area has been designated a natural heritage site by the Iranian Department of Environment.

== See also ==
- List of waterfalls
- Alborz mountain range topics
