= Qareh Qaj, Kermanshah =

Qareh Qaj قره قاج
- Village
- Location within Iran
- Coordinates: 34°40′41″N 47°22′16″E
- Country: Iran
- Province: Kermanshah
- County: Sahneh
- Bakhsh: Dinavar
- Rural District: Horr

Population (2006)
  - Total: 311
- Time zone: UTC+3:30 (IRST)
  - Summer (DST): UTC+4:30 (IRDT)

Qareh Qaj (Persian: قره قاج, also Romanized as Qareh Qāj; also known as Qarah Qāch, Qara Qāj, Qareh Qāch, and Qareh Qāreh) is a village in Horr Rural District, Dinavar District, Sahneh County, Kermanshah Province, Iran. At the 2006 census, its population was 311, in 77 families.
