= Naqiabad-e Nadar =

Naqiabad-e Nadar نقي ابادندر
- Village
- Location within Iran
- Coordinates: 33°49′48″N 48°16′15″E
- Country: Iran
- Province: Lorestan
- County: Selseleh
- Bakhsh: Central
- Rural District: Qaleh-ye Mozaffari

Population (2006)
  - Total: 190
- Time zone: UTC+3:30 (IRST)
  - Summer (DST): UTC+4:30 (IRDT)

Naqiabad-e Nadar (Persian: نقي ابادندر, also Romanized as Naqīābād-e Nadar; also known as Naqīābād) is a village in Qaleh-ye Mozaffari Rural District, in the Central District of Selseleh County, Lorestan Province, Iran. At the 2006 census, its population was 190, in 44 families.
