= Baluchabad-e Kahnaki =

Baluchabad-e Kahnaki بلوچ ابادكهنكي
- Village
- Location within Iran
- Coordinates: 28°31′41″N 60°36′04″E
- Country: Iran
- Province: Sistan and Baluchestan
- County: Khash
- Bakhsh: Nukabad
- Rural District: Eskelabad

Population (2006)
  - Total: 26
- Time zone: UTC+3:30 (IRST)
  - Summer (DST): UTC+4:30 (IRDT)

Baluchabad-e Kahnaki (Persian: بلوچ ابادكهنكي, also Romanized as Balūchābād-e Kahnakī; also known as Balūchābād) is a village in Eskelabad Rural District, Nukabad District, Khash County, Sistan and Baluchestan Province, Iran. At the 2006 census, its population was 26, in 7 families.
