= Okhli, Republic of Dagestan =

Okhli Охли Ухӏлиб
- Selo
- Location within Republic of Dagestan Location within Russia
- Coordinates: 42°33′N 47°12′E
- Country: Russia
- Region: Republic of Dagestan
- District: Levashinsky District
- Time zone: UTC+3:00

Okhli (Russian: Охли; Avar: Ухӏлиб) is a rural locality (a selo) in Levashinsky District, Republic of Dagestan, Russia. The population was 1,901 as of 2010. There are 15 streets.

== Geography ==
Okhli is located 23 km northwest of Levashi (the district's administrative centre) by road, on the Nakhatar River. Kulemtsa and Akhkent are the nearest rural localities.

== Nationalities ==
Avars live there.
