= Qarah Qach, West Azerbaijan =

Qarah Qach قره‌قاچ
- village
- Location within Iran
- Coordinates: 36°36′51″N 45°33′21″E
- Country: Iran
- Province: West Azerbaijan
- County: Mahabad
- Bakhsh: Khalifan
- Rural District: Mangur-e Sharqi

Population (2006)
  - Total: 44
- Time zone: UTC+3:30 (IRST)
  - Summer (DST): UTC+4:30 (IRDT)

Qarah Qach (Persian: قره‌قاچ, also Romanized as Qarah Qāch; also known as Qarah Qāj) is a village in Mangur-e Sharqi Rural District, Khalifan District, Mahabad County, West Azerbaijan Province, Iran. At the 2006 census, its population was 44, in 8 families.
