= Baluchabad-e Sargorich =

Baluchabad-e Sargorich بلوچ ابادسرگريچ
- Village
- Location within Iran
- Coordinates: 28°06′26″N 57°30′14″E
- Country: Iran
- Province: Kerman
- County: Faryab
- Bakhsh: Central
- Rural District: Mehruiyeh

Population (2006)
  - Total: 216
- Time zone: UTC+3:30 (IRST)
  - Summer (DST): UTC+4:30 (IRDT)

Baluchabad-e Sargorich (Persian: بلوچ ابادسرگريچ, also Romanized as Balūchābād-e Sargorīch; also known as Balūchābād) is a village in Mehruiyeh Rural District, in the Central District of Faryab County, Kerman Province, Iran. At the 2006 census, its population was 216, in 43 families.
