= Okhli =

Okhli اخلي
- Village
- Location within Iran
- Coordinates: 37°37′23″N 57°18′14″E
- Country: Iran
- Province: North Khorasan
- County: Bojnord
- Bakhsh: Garmkhan
- Rural District: Garmkhan

Population (2006)
  - Total: 233
- Time zone: UTC+3:30 (IRST)
  - Summer (DST): UTC+4:30 (IRDT)

Okhli (Persian: اخلي, also Romanized as Okhlī) is a village in Garmkhan Rural District, Garmkhan District, Bojnord County, North Khorasan Province, Iran. At the 2006 census, its population was 233, in 58 families.
