= Baluchabad, Kerman =

Baluchabad بلوچ اباد
- Village
- Interactive map of Baluchabad
- Coordinates: 28°03′42″N 57°49′15″E
- Country: Iran
- Province: Kerman
- County: Kahnuj
- Bakhsh: Central
- Rural District: Nakhlestan

Population (2006)
  - Total: 209
- Time zone: UTC+3:30 (IRST)
  - Summer (DST): UTC+4:30 (IRDT)

Baluchabad (Persian: بلوچ اباد, also Romanized as Balūchābād) is a village in Nakhlestan Rural District, in the Central District of Kahnuj County, Kerman Province, Iran. At the 2006 census, its population was 209, in 43 families.
