= Sadd-e Karun Chahar =

Sadd-e Karun Chahar سدكارون چهار
- Village
- Country: Iran
- Province: Khuzestan
- County: Andika
- Bakhsh: Abezhdan
- Rural District: Abezhdan

Population (2006)
  - Total: 22
- Time zone: UTC+3:30 (IRST)
  - Summer (DST): UTC+4:30 (IRDT)

Sadd-e Karun Chahar (Persian: سدكارون چهار, also Romanized as Sadd-e Kārūn Chahār) is a village in Abezhdan Rural District, Abezhdan District, Andika County, Khuzestan Province, Iran. At the 2006 census, its population was 22, in 9 families.
