= Toroq, Mashhad =

Toroq طرق
- Village
- Location within Iran
- Coordinates: 36°12′32″N 59°39′50″E
- Country: Iran
- Province: Razavi Khorasan
- County: Mashhad
- Bakhsh: Ahmadabad
- Rural District: Sarjam

Population (2006)
  - Total: 23,491
- Time zone: UTC+3:30 (IRST)
  - Summer (DST): UTC+4:30 (IRDT)

Toroq (Persian: طرق, also Romanized as Ţoroq; also known as Sadd-e Ţoroq and Turuq) is a village in Sarjam Rural District, Ahmadabad District, Mashhad County, Razavi Khorasan Province, Iran. At the 2006 census, its population was 23,491, in 5,943 families.
