= Daland, Iran =

City in Golestan province, Iran

Daland Persian: دلند
- City
- Location within Iran
- Coordinates: 37°02′04″N 55°02′53″E
- Country: Iran
- Province: Golestan
- County: Ramian
- District: Central
- Established as a city: 1995

Population (2016)
  - Total: 8,184
- Time zone: UTC+3:30 (IRST)

Daland (Persian: دلند) is a city in the Central District of Ramian County, Golestan province, Iran. The village of Daland was converted to a city in 1995.

== Demographics ==
=== Population ===
At the time of the 2006 National Census, the city's population was 7,732 in 1,981 households. The following census in 2011 counted 7,992 people in 2,247 households. The 2016 census measured the population of the city as 8,184 people in 2,453 households.
