= Fenderesk District =

District in Golestan province, Iran

Fenderesk District Persian: بخش فندرسک
- District
- Location within Iran
- Coordinates: 36°58′N 54°59′E
- Country: Iran
- Province: Golestan
- County: Ramian
- Established: 2001
- Capital: Khan Bebin

Population (2016)
  - Total: 36,472
- Time zone: UTC+3:30 (IRST)

Fenderesk District (Persian: بخش فندرسک) is in Ramian County, Golestan province, Iran. Its capital is the city of Khan Bebin.

== Etymology ==
The origin of the name Fenderesk is rooted in the administrative structure of the mountain districts of northern Iran. On the Iranian landscape today, a mountain is generally referred to as a kuh (Persian), dagh (Turkic) and, to a much lesser extent, jabal (Arabic). Lost among these are words such as “gar or jar”, “ostan”, “fand/fend”, and “band/vand” that in their own context also mean “mountain”.

=== Mountain worship ===
In Persian mythology, mountains occupied a place of prominence. As noted in the legends of Iran's kings and heroes described in Ferdowsi's Shahnamah (Book of Kings), Saam sent his albino son Zaal into the Alborz Mountains to be rid of the evil that had afflicted him; Alborz was King Manouchehr's retreat and the scene of many a battle fought by Rostam, Persia's national hero; the villain Zahak was imprisoned at Damavand, in the Alborz range; and the hero Arash Kamangheer (the Archer) flung his arrow from Damavand to mark the eastward frontier of Manouchehr's kingdom. On Mount Asnavand, Keikhosro, the mythical Kyanian king, built the first of the three celebrated fire-temples. Another Kyanian king, Gashtasp, built the temple Azar Barzin Mehr at Navand, a mountain in the northwest of present-day Sabzevar in Kohrassan. According to Avestan traditions, the sacred libation hom grew in the mountains. The Greek historian Herodotus (d. 425 BCE) noted that the Persians’ “wont ... is to ascend the summits of the loftiest mountains, and there to offer sacrifice to [Ahuramazda] which is the name they give to the whole circuit of firmament”.

==== Lords of Mountains ====
Spirituality aside, in a practical sense, the snow-capped mountains were the source of water, they afforded protection, and dominated the plains, roads and settlements below, and served as watchtowers. It would have been quite a thing to command or rule one. The principal Avestan word (Yasht 19, section 1) for mountain was gar. The first of Persia's legendary kings was Kyoumars, who was known also as Garshah, which meant, according to the Iranian lexicographer Dehkhoda, “mountain king”. The name of another king, Garshasp, too embodied an association with mountains. The title of a Sassanid prince, Hormuz son of Bahram, was kuhbod, which meant “commander of the mountain”.

The Arabicized form of gar was jar and, according to Ibn Isfandiyar (c. 1226), this latter term, in the Tabari tongue of northern Iran, had come to mean a mountain that bore trees and bushes and on which one could farm. Not unexpectedly among the mountain majesties of northern Iran one encounters the titles of jar-shah and malek al-jebal borne by the Karanvand dynasts who ruled in the mountains of Tabarestan from 570 to 839 AD. Of these titles, the first was a variation of Garshah (mountain king) and the second appellation was a construction meaning “lord of mountains”. According to Abu-Ali Mohammad Balami (fl. 946-973 AD), in the area ruled by Karan “there are many villages and there the people are kuhyar [mountain-folk] and ... all the mountains there were named for him and to this day are named after his descendents”.

The Padusban dynasts of northern Iran governed the region from Gilan to Amol from 665 to 1596. Initially they bore the title Ostandar. In Tabari, the word ostan meant “mountain” and dar by itself or from dara, meaning “king”, meant “one who has/holds/rules” and so an ostandar was one who governed the mountain. The term Ostandari, as in Ruyan Ostandari, as mentioned in Ibn Isfandiyar's Tarikh-e Tabarestan (History of Tabarestan, c. 1216), denoted an administrative office/title or seat of the mountain governorate.

Beginning in the 8th century one finds among the Karanvand and Padusban dynasts the use of the name Vandad (variation: Vanda). The fourth Karanvand ruler bore the name Vandad Hormoz son of Neda (d. c. 813-833 AD). A Padusban ruler called Vanda Omid son of Shahriyar (r. 791-823– ). Among the Bavand dynasts, who ruled in the Mazandaran region of Tabarestan as “kings of mountains” from 665 AD to 1006 AD, was Vanda son of Bavand (c. late 10th century). Vandad or Bandad occurred in many exotic forms: By the 10th century variations such as Bandad, Bandaz, Bondaz, and Bandar were noted in Ibn al-Faqih al-Hamadhani's Kitab al-Buldan (c. 902 AD). Arguably, vandad and bandad were related, phonetically, as “b” is an accepted substitute for the older “v” in Persian, according to Dehkhoda. These names were related also in that they sprang in regions that were mountainous.

According to Seyyed Zahir al-Din Mar'ashi, a 15th-century Persian historian, in 838-839 AD the lieutenant of the Abbasid Caliphate in Tabarestan delegated the governorship of Kuhestan, land of many mountains, bordering Khorassan, to one called Bandar. Because the reference to this individual contained no eponymous designation one may conclude that Bandar [read: Band+dar, like Ostan+dar or Vand+dar] was a title or office, and it would have been an apt one for one destined to govern a mountainous region.

In Steingass's Persian Dictionary (1892), the noun band is noted, among other things, to mean “mound”. Its popular and familiar usage as “dam” is obvious in Band-e Amir near Shiraz and its meaning as “obstacle or road block” is evident in the word rah-bandan. Band-e Amir was built in the 10th century on the order of the Buyeh ruler Azod-Dowleh Dailami, whose dynasty originated from the Dailam mountain region in Gilan in north-central Iran that encompasses the Caspian Provinces of Gilan, Mazandaran and Golestan (formerly Gorgan, Astarabad).

That word band in Gilaki and Tabari languages of north-central Iran meant “mountain”. According to Hyacinth Louis Rabino (Mazandaran and Astarabad, 1924), the Langa region of Tankabon district was divided into Jurband (or Balaband, upper-band) and Jirband (Zir-band/Payin-band, lower-band) and the low wooded hills that separated the plain from the summer camps were known as Miyanband (middle-band). The meaning of “band” as “mountain” in Miyanband is supported further by the example of Siyahband (Black Mountain) and Kiyabandan (Kiya Mountains) as the unambiguous names of two mountains so-named and located in the Larijan area near Amol.

=== Fenderiyya ===
Where there is a vand or band, meaning "mountain", there can be also a fand. This obtains on one level under the rules of substitution of sounds (ibdal). In Persian fand is recognized expressly as a form of band. By the 9th century fand had begun to replace band in Iranian place-names: As recorded by Yahya bin Jaber al-Baladhuri (d. 892), for example, Ashband, a district near Naishahpur, in Khorassan became Ashfand. On another level, fand is also an acceptable form for vand, particularly in Arabic transformation of Persian or other foreign words – such as in Fandal, which is the Arabic for Vandal, a Germanic people who ruled parts of North Africa from 429 to 534 AD. Another example of this “v” to “f”’ substitution is offered in the place-name Sarvandkar/Sarfandkar in Sham (Syria) as reported in the geographical work of Abulfeda (d. 1331).

Yaqut al-Hamavi’s geographical dictionary (c. 1224) defined fand as a section of a mountain (jabal). His work contained references to a number of place-names that contained the morpheme /fnd/ such as in Fendalau in Sham (Syria), Fandavayn in Marv (Northwest Iran), Fandisajan in Nahavand (Iran) and Sarfandeh, a village in the Sur region of Syria. With the exception of a few place-names that have retained the morpheme /fnd/ there is no mountain in modern Iran that is referred to as “fand” or by its variant fend. Yaqut's Fandavayn in Marv and Fandisajan in Nahavand regions of Iran are decidedly mountainous in character. Among less than a handful of contemporary fand-bearing toponyms in Iran, Fandoglu near Miyaneh in Azarbaijan and Fandokht near Birjand in Kohrassan are mountainy places, too, as are Fand in the Damavand region, and Fenderesk northeast of Gorgan.

It is not clear exactly when fand or fend entered the nomenclature of place-names in north-central Iran other than it would have been associated with Islamic conquest of Mazandaran and the ensuing 8th century migrations by descendants of Muhammad from Hejaz, Syria and Iraq into areas of present-day northern Iran such as Amol, Babol (formerly Barforush, earlier Mamtir) and Babolsar (formerly Mashadsar), Qaemshahr (formerly Shahi, earlier Aliababd), Sari and Gorgan (formerly Astarabad, presently Golestan).

In the course of migration of the descendants and adherents of Imam Ali from Hejaz, Syria and Iraq to Mazandaran/Tabarestan in northern Iran, there was one Ebrahim (b. Madina, after 765 AD) and his sister Bibi Sakineh, children of Imam Musa Kazem (d. Baghdad, 799). Ebrahim is cited as a direct ancestor in the genealogy of the Mousavi-Hosseini family that governed Fenderesk between 16th and early 19th centuries. Ebrahim settled in the present-day area of Babolsar, fifteen kilometers north of Mamtir (later, Barforoush and now Babol). After Ebrahim's death a sanctuary (imamzadeh) began around his tomb and for the sake of the prayers that were answered he received the name Abu Javab. The settlement became a town and took the name Mashadsar, the resting place for the martyred.

At the time of their arrival in the 8th century, the religious migrants of the House of Ali became neighbors to the Padusban rulers of Mazandaran and emulated from them the administrative nomenclature ostandariyya, which in the Tabari language meant “place of mountain lord” from ostan ("mountain"), dar ("holder"), and the locative suffix -iyya ("-place"). In their vernacular the new arrivals devised fanderiyya or fenderiyya, in which fand substituted for the local ostan and this became the name of a place that Rabino identified as Fender-i Namavar [Persian: ﺮﻮﺎﻤﻧ ﻯﺮﺩﻧﻔ], a rural district located at the foot of the mountains nineteen miles of Babol and eight five miles south-southwest of Aliabad (later, Shahi, presently Qaemshahr) in the Bala Taijan area, which is shown in a 1720 Dutch map Nova Persiae (Amsterdam: R & I Ottens, 1720) as Panderis. The designation Fender-i was clearly an administrative designation. The name Namavar itself was borne by many among the Padusban ruling-family of the Amol region (665-1596).

Among the siyyids who emigrated to the Amol region, the Mar’ashis were one group that stood out as the probable originator of the term fanderiyya or fenderiyya. Claiming descent from Imam Zayn al-Abedin (b. Madina, 658-59; d. Madina, 713-14 AD), it is not clear when they arrived in the region except that they first went from Madina to Mar’ash, in Sham (Syria), where they were settled long enough to acquire the relational (nisba) Mar’ashi.

=== Fenderesk ===
Mar’ash itself lay south east of a place called Sarfandkar. In the geographical work of Abulfeda (d. 1331) reference is made to a place called Sarfandkar, which was also written as Sarvandkar. According to Abulfeda, this was an important place in Sham: It was a citadel located on the southern bank of the Djaihan River east of Tell Hamoun, southeast of Ain Zarbah, and west of the Marra defile, one of the passes into the Almanus Mountains. Commanding the defile, the citadel was built atop a rock and it had no walls, as it was itself surrounded naturally by rocks. In light of its geographical description and a 10th-century map of Sham in Ashkal al-Alam by Abulqasem bin Ahmad Jaihani (F. Mansouri edition, 1989–90), the place would have been in the northwest corner of present-day Syria known as Kordagh (Kord Mountain), northeast of Mar’ash.

Etymologically, the structure of Sarfandkar offers a useful clue about the structure of Fenderesk. In Sumerian, the suffix kar meant “fortification”, a meaning that resonates in the Persian meaning for kar as “construction or building”. So, fand/mountain + kar/fortification could = fandkar/mountain fortress. The noun sar in Persian meant “head” or “summit” but its occurrence in both Yaqut's Sarfandeh and Abulfeda's Sarfandkar would suggest that it was a part of a compound noun such as sarfand meaning “mountain chief”, an office. This would have had to be so because Sarfandkar was situated in a valley even though it was built on a rock, hardly a reason to call the place “mountain top”.

By 1359, the Mar’ashi were sufficiently in favor among the Amol population that they rose against the established local order and assumed control of the region. After the Mongol invasion of Persia, the government of Gorgan and Astarabad fell into the hands of a local chief named Mir-Vali, who ruled from 1353 to 1382. The rulers of the Amol-Sari region at this time were the Mar’ashi and one among them, Siyyid Kamal ad-Din Mar’ashi (r. 1361-1393– ), became a target for assassination plots hatched by Mir-Vali. In a battle fought at Tamisheh (probably Behshahr) east of Sari and on the border of Gorgan, the Mar’ashi chief overcame his rival and sent him scurrying eastward into the mountains (kuhsarat) and farther into Khorassan. This defeat placed Gorgan and Astarabad in the Mar’ashi domain. In connection with the aftermath of this event, a group of immigrants from Fenderi possibly settled the region that was identified with Fender.

That the toponymy of Fenderesk be rooted in the Mar’ashi migration from the Mar’ash region of Syria is further buttressed by the probable transposition of the name Marra, the name of the mountain range, from the Sarfandkar-Mar’ash region of Syria, to north-central Iran – such as in the names of Maran fortress at Marankuh Mountain in the Takht-e Rustam area of Ramiyan, south of Fenderesk), halfway between the Asyman and Nilkuh mountains. The name Maran also occurs in toponyms Maran and Marankuh in the Tankabon (Shahsavar of the Pahlavi era) region of north-central Iran. According to Mohammad-Ebrahim Nazari (from Shahi, now Qaem-Shahr) (Tarikh-i katul, 1996), the fand/fend in Fenderesk refers to the mountainous topography of the region, but in the Gilaki language of northern Iran, the term fander signifies looking in a watchful or inquisitive fashion, which, according to Nazari, could have been the function of the area's Maran fortress.

While the foregoing explains how fend (mountain) evolved to fenderiyya or ostandariyya evolved to fenderiyya (mountain administrative unit) and then to Fenderi, it does not explain how Fenderesk came to acquire its -sk ending. One explanation may be that Fenderi was indeed F/Penderis, as the aforementioned Dutch map indicated. In that case it is likely that F/Penderis would become, when transplanted in a new region, as Fenderisak, literally meaning, “Little Fenderis”. This would be in league with examples such as Farim, a rural district sixty kilometers south of Sari and Farimak, a village eighty kilometers east of Sari. Another explanation would be that “s” in F/Penderis was a residue of a longer suffix that attached to Fenderi. In the Fenderi region, the noun rustak referred to rural districts. One particular and rare form of it was reskat and an example of it appeared in the place-name Bala–reskat [ﺖﻛﺳﺮﻻﺎﺑ], upper village, in northern Shahi, where a domed brick-structure supported an inscription dating to 1009. At one point Fenderi-reskat (village) became Fenderiskat and later Fenderis, for short. The inversion of k and t in rustak/reskat would have been no less anomalous than when in current Persian one hears ask for aks (picture) or in English one hears "ax" for "ask" (inquire).

It is equally likely that when the migrants from Fenderi reached the Gorgan region their abode came to be known as Fenderiasak or Fenderasak or, as the lexicologist F. Steingass's Persian-English Dictionary (1892) noted, Fandarsag. The German Iranist and Avesta scholar Wilhelm Geiger (d. 1943) believed that in the Avestan language the word asagh (var. asak) meant “district”. Based on this assumption, arguably Fenderesk (by way of Fenderi-asak, or Fenderi-sak) therefore derived its name from the place being designated as the district of the Fenderi.

It is possible that Fandarsag, if a correct form, could have derived from the protonym “vandarasak”, in which “vandar” meant the holder of the mountain and “asak” meant district, yielding the toponym “district of the holder of the mountain”, whom the phonetically inclined – emigrant or outsider - converted into Fandarasak, and eventually into Fenderesak.

=== First nisba ===
The earliest evidence of Fenderesk as a toponym appeared in the form of a nisba (relational) for one Khajeh Ahmad Fendereski, who was ruling Astarabad in 1508-09. This reference predated the birth of the region's preeminent son, Hakim Abul Qasem Mir Fendereski (d. 1563) and this eliminates with certainty the Hakim as the source of the place-name. According to the grants of Astarabad collected in the sixth volume of Az Astara ta Astarabad (Masih Zabihi and Manouchehr Sotodeh, 1975), in May/June 1522, his son, Mir Kamal ad-Din, received from Shah Ismail Safavi a grant for Chupalani village to which more places were added as the family was favored more. In a firman (edict) dated August 1591, Shah Abbas I the Great confirmed the land grant of Fenderesk, Ramiyan and Abr to Mirza Beik Fendereski (d. 1601).

== Demographics ==
=== Population ===
At the time of the 2006 National Census, the district's population was 34,326 in 8,206 households. The following census in 2011 counted 36,390 people in 10,138 households. The 2016 census measured the population of the district as 36,472 inhabitants in 10,771 households.

=== Administrative divisions ===
Fenderesk District Population
Administrative Divisions	2006	2011	2016
Fenderesk-e Jonubi RD (Note: Formerly Fenderesk Rural District)	16,715	17,858	18,435
Fenderesk-e Shomali RD	7,176	7,525	7,159
Khan Bebin (city)	10,435	11,007	10,878
Total	34,326	36,390	36,472
RD = Rural District

== Geography ==
The Shirabad waterfall is 7 km to the south of Khanbehbin town and in the slopes of the Alborz mountains in a forested area. On its way, there are some beautiful springs and rivers. This waterfall is in the form of a stairway and includes twelve large and small waterfalls. Its largest waterfall is 30 meters high and its lake is 40–80 meters deep.

== Notable people ==
Jafar Abad Namtaloo in Fenderesk District is the birthplace of the scientist and philosopher Mir Abulqasim Mirfendereski (c. 970-1050 AH).
