= Central District (Ramian County) =

District in Golestan province, Iran

Central District (Ramian County) Persian: بخش مرکزی شهرستان راميان
- District
- Location within Iran
- Coordinates: 36°58′N 55°07′E
- Country: Iran
- Province: Golestan
- County: Ramian
- Established: 2001
- Capital: Ramian

Population (2016)
  - Total: 49,737
- Time zone: UTC+3:30 (IRST)

The Central District of Ramian County (Persian: بخش مرکزی شهرستان راميان) is in Golestan province, Iran. Its capital is the city of Ramian.

== History ==
The village of Tatar-e Olya was converted to a city in 2011.

== Demographics ==
=== Population ===
At the time of the 2006 National Census, the district's population was 47,540 in 11,373 households. The following census in 2011 counted 48,934 people in 13,480 households. The 2016 census measured the population of the district as 49,737 inhabitants in 14,807 households.

=== Administrative divisions ===
Central District (Ramian County) Population
Administrative Divisions	2006	2011	2016
Daland RD	25,106	25,660	20,754
Qaleh Miran RD	2,983	3,019	3,591
Daland (city)	7,732	7,992	8,184
Ramian (city)	11,719	12,263	12,426
Tatar-e Olya (city)			4,782
Total	47,540	48,934	49,737
RD = Rural District
