= Ramian County =

County in Golestan province, Iran

Ramian County Persian: شهرستان راميان
- County
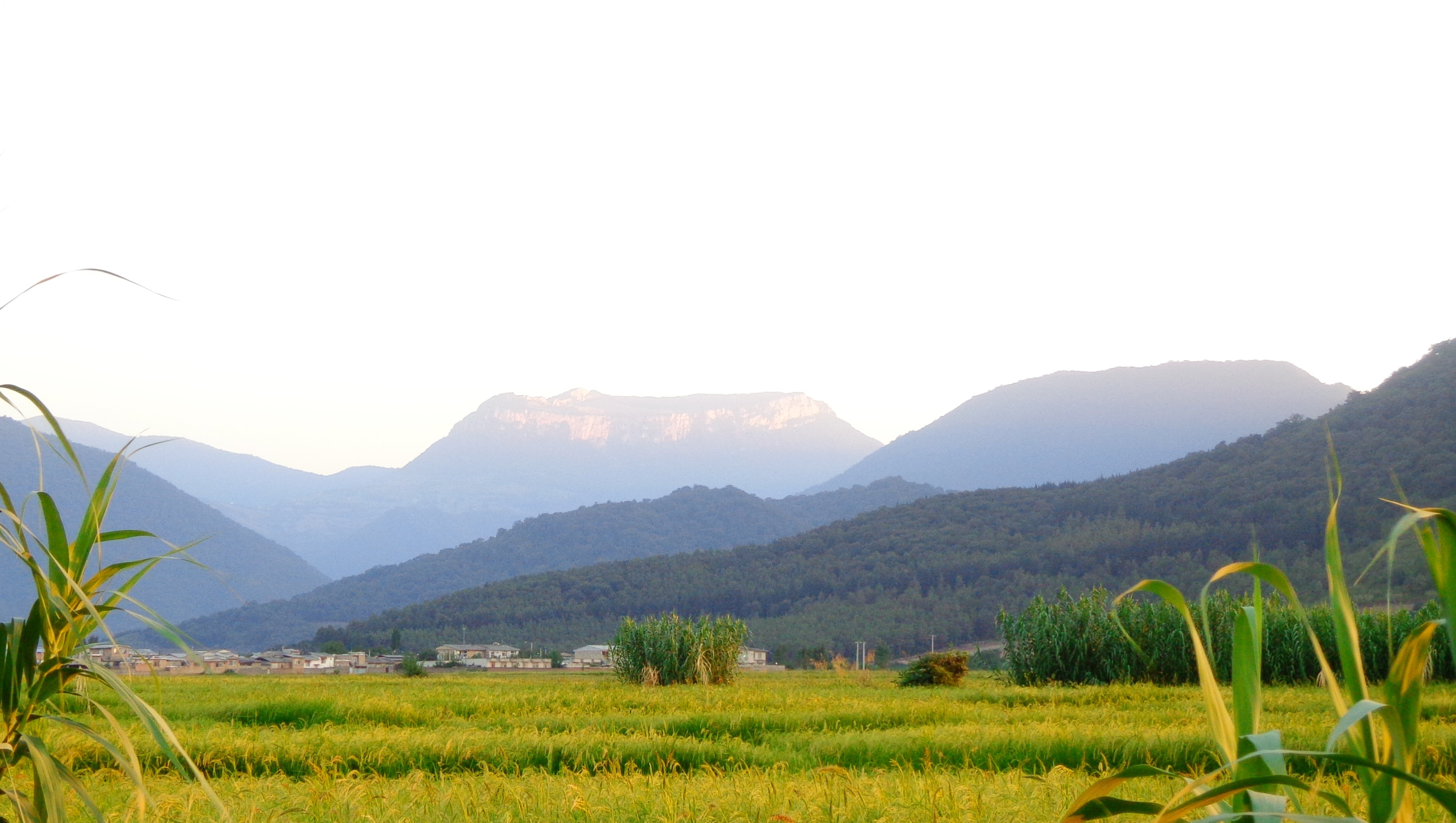
- Ramian County in summer

- Location of Ramian County in Golestan province (center, purple)

- Location of Golestan province in Iran
- Coordinates: 37°00′N 55°06′E
- Country: Iran
- Province: Golestan
- Established: 2001
- Capital: Ramian
- Districts: Central, Fenderesk

Population (2016)
  - Total: 86,210
- Time zone: UTC+3:30 (IRST)

Ramian County (Persian: شهرستان رامیان) is in Golestan province, Iran. Its capital is the city of Ramian.

== History ==
The village of Tatar-e Olya was converted to a city in 2011.

== Demographics ==
=== Population ===
At the time of the 2006 National Census, the county's population was 81,866 in 19,579 households. The following census in 2011 counted 85,324 people in 23,598 households. The 2016 census measured the population of the county as 86,210 in 25,579 households.

=== Administrative divisions ===
Ramian County's population history and administrative structure over three consecutive censuses are shown in the following table.

Ramian County Population
Administrative Divisions	2006	2011	2016
Central District	47,540	48,934	49,737
Daland RD	25,106	25,660	20,754
Qaleh Miran RD	2,983	3,019	3,591
Daland (city)	7,732	7,992	8,184
Ramian (city)	11,719	12,263	12,426
Tatar-e Olya (city)			4,782
Fenderesk District	34,326	36,390	36,472
Fenderesk-e Jonubi RD (Note: Formerly Fenderesk Rural District)	16,715	17,858	18,435
Fenderesk-e Shomali RD	7,176	7,525	7,159
Khan Bebin (city)	10,435	11,007	10,878
Total	81,866	85,324	86,210
RD = Rural District

== See also ==
Media related to Ramian County at Wikimedia Commons
