= Sepehr Arash =

Iranian arm wrestler (born 1999)

Personal information
- Born: 18 February 1999 (age 27) Bojnord, Iran

Sport
- Sport: Arm wrestling
Medal record
International competitions (representing Iran)
| Silver medal – second place | Mr. Universe – Tehran (2024) | Right Hand – Para/Standing 65+ |
National championships
| Gold medal – first place | Iran National Championships (2022) | Open Category Arm Wrestling |
| Gold medal – first place | Iran National Championship (2023) |

Sepehr Arash (born 29 February 1999, in Bojnord) is an Iranian athlete and member of the national arm wrestling team. In 2024, he won the silver medal at the International Mr. Universe Arm Wrestling Championships.
