= Mount Shahjahan =

Mountain in Iran

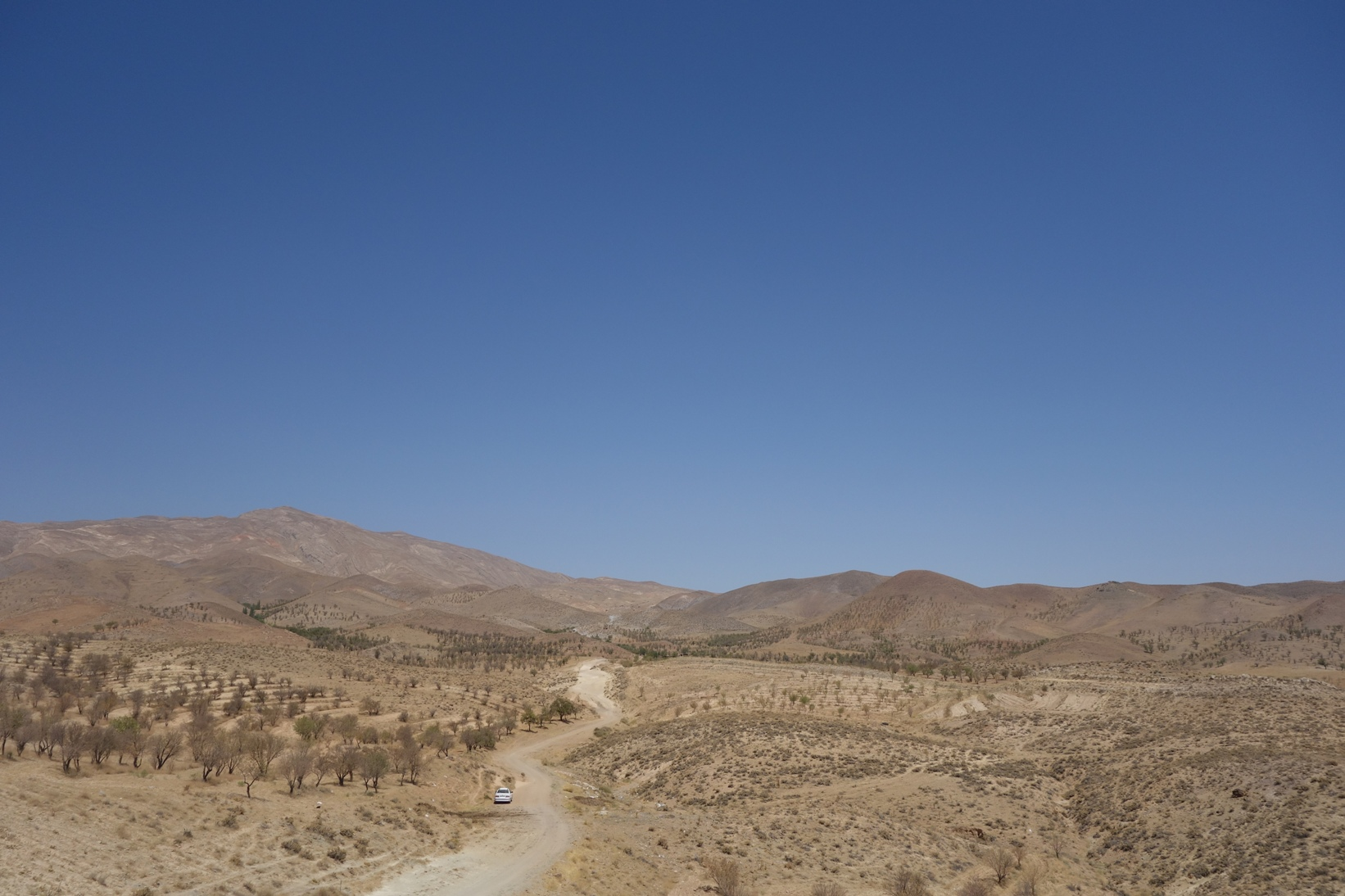
Mount Shahjahan in 2009

With an elevation of 3,032 metres, Mount Shahjahan (Kuh-e Shahjahan) is the highest point in the Aladagh Mountains and North Khorasan Province in the northeastern Iran. This peak is located in the southeastern part of the Aladagh Range. The cities of Faruj and Shirvan are situated in the northeast and the north, respectively, the city of Esfarayen lies to the west, and Bojnurd, the capital of North Khorasan, is to the northwest. Mainly formed in the Miocene and the Pliocene, Mount Shahjahan is made chiefly of Jurassic rocks.
