= North Khorasan University of Medical Sciences =

Public medical university in Bojnord, Iran

- دانشگاه علوم پزشکی و خدمات بهداشتی درمانی خراسان شمالی
- Type: Public
- Established: 1991
- Parent institution: Ministry of Health and Medical Education
- Chancellor: Seyed Ahmad Hashemi
- Students: 2,221 (2026)
- Location: Bojnord, North Khorasan, Iran; 37.4513°N 57.3207°E
- Website: nkums.ac.ir

North Khorasan University of Medical Sciences (NKUMS; Persian: دانشگاه علوم پزشکی و خدمات بهداشتی درمانی خراسان شمالی) is a public medical university in Bojnord, North Khorasan province, Iran. It is administered by the Iranian Ministry of Health and Medical Education and operates faculties, research centres and hospitals across the province.

== History ==
The university began as the Bojnord School of Nursing in 1991. The school was initially affiliated with Mashhad University of Medical Sciences. Following the creation of North Khorasan province, it became an independent faculty of medical sciences in 2005.

The institution was granted university status in 2008 following approval by the Council for the Development of Medical Universities.

In 2014, the nursing school in Esfarayen was upgraded to the Esfarayen Faculty of Medical Sciences and became independent from North Khorasan University of Medical Sciences.

== Faculties and schools ==
North Khorasan University of Medical Sciences includes the following faculties and schools:

- Faculty of Medicine
- Faculty of Dentistry
- Faculty of Nursing and Midwifery
- Faculty of Health and Nutrition Sciences
- Faculty of Paramedical Sciences
- Shirvan School of Nursing

The university also operates an emergency medical education centre in Maneh and Samalqan.

== Research ==
Research centres affiliated with the university work in areas including natural products and medicinal plants, vector-borne diseases, addiction and behavioural sciences, regenerative medicine and clinical care.

=== Academic journal ===
The university publishes the Journal of North Khorasan University of Medical Sciences, which covers research in medicine and the health sciences.

=== Highly cited researchers ===
In 2025, faculty members Fatemeh Oroujlouyan and Amir Amani were reported as being among the world's top one per cent of highly cited researchers, based on Web of Science–ESI data and a report by the Islamic World Science Citation Center.

== Rankings ==
North Khorasan University of Medical Sciences was placed in the 1501+ band of the 2026 Times Higher Education World University Rankings. It was also placed in the 1001+ band for Medical and Health subjects.

== Affiliated hospitals ==
Hospitals affiliated with the university include:

- Imam Reza Hospital, Bojnord
- Imam Hassan Hospital, Bojnord
- Bentolhoda Hospital, Bojnord
- Imam Ali Hospital, Bojnord
- Imam Khomeini Hospital, Shirvan
- Ayatollah Hashemi Rafsanjani Hospital, Shirvan
- Javad al-Aemeh Hospital, Jajarm
- Pour Sina Hospital, Ashkhaneh
- Shohadaye Faruj Hospital, Faruj

== International activities ==
The university's international programmes are administered by its Directorate of International Affairs.

In January 2026, an office of the Universal Scientific Education and Research Network (USERN) was opened at the university. The office was established to support international educational and research cooperation.

== See also ==
- List of universities in Iran
- List of medical schools in Iran
- Ministry of Health and Medical Education
- Mashhad University of Medical Sciences
