= Reactions to the assassination of Qasem Soleimani =

Worldwide responses to the killing of Qasem Soleimani and other military commanders

The killing of Iranian Major General and Quds Force commander Qasem Soleimani in Iraq by the United States brought strong reactions from around the world; Including: United Nations, Iran, United States, Iraq, NATO, G20 states, China, Russia, France, Germany, India, Indonesia, Italy, Japan, South Korea, Mexico, South Africa, Turkey, UK," Afghanistan, Albania, Armenia, Azerbaijan, Bahrain, Belarus, Bulgaria, Cuba, Denmark Egypt, Finland, Georgia, Greece, Kazakhstan, Lebanon, Malaysia, Pakistan, Philippines, Qatar, Slovakia, Syria, United Arab Emirates, Venezuela, Yemen, etc.

Supreme Leader (of Iran) Ali Khamenei declared three days of mourning, and vowed to take "harsh revenge" against the U.S. The Iranian president also said that Iran "will take revenge". A number of anti-war rallies were held in more than 30 U.S. cities, asking the withdrawal of U.S. troops from Iraq. Thousands marched in 70 cities across the country in New York City, Chicago, Washington, D.C. and others.

On 4 January, a funeral procession for Soleimani was held in Iraq with thousands of mourners in attendance, waving Iraqi and militia flags and chanting "death to America, death to Israel". The procession started at the Al-Kadhimiya Mosque in Baghdad. Iraq's prime minister, Adil Abdul-Mahdi, and leaders of Iran-backed militias attended the funeral procession. Soleimani's remains were taken to the holy Shia cities of Karbala and Najaf. Also, the remains of the bodies arrived in Ahvaz, and then Mashhad. Tens of thousands of mourners in black clothes attended the funeral procession with green, white, and red flags.

== United Nations ==
A BBC article on 9 July 2020, has a link to the Report of the Special Rapporteur on extrajudicial, summary or arbitrary executions (5 June – 3 July 2020) which states:

"Accordingly, in light of the evidence that the US has provided to date, the targeting of General Soleimani, and the deaths of those accompanying him, constitute an arbitrary killing for which, under IHRL, the US is responsible. The strike was in violation of Art. 2(4) of the UN Charter with insufficient evidence provided of an ongoing or imminent attack. No evidence has been provided that General Soleimani specifically was planning an imminent attack against US interests, particularly in Iraq, for which immediate action was necessary and would have been justified. No evidence has been provided that a drone strike in a third country was necessary or that the harm caused to that country was proportionate to the harm allegedly averted. While there is information suggesting that the US requested, at least in December 2019, that Iraq take action against Kata'ib Hezbollah, no evidence has been provided that Iraq was consulted on how to alleviate any threats posed to the US arising from the visit of General Soleimani, such that Iraq should bear the burden of addressing those threats. No evidence has been produced that there was no time for the US to seek aid from the international community, including the UNSC, in addressing the alleged imminent threats. Major General Soleimani was in charge of Iran military strategy, and actions, in Syria and Iraq. But absent an actual imminent threat to life, the course of action taken by the US was unlawful."

A report by the United Nations Special Rapporteur on extrajudicial, summary, or arbitrary executions, Agnes Callamard, states that the United States did not provide sufficient evidence of an imminent threat to life to justify the attack.

Iran issued arrest warrants for U.S. President Donald Trump and 35 others on charges of murder and terrorism related to the killing. As the commander of the Quds Force, the overseas operations branch of the Islamic Revolutionary Guard Corps (IRGC), Soleimani was a key architect of Iranian policy across the Middle East. He was responsible for the Quds Force's covert missions and for providing guidance, funding, weapons, intelligence, and logistical support to allied governments and armed groups, including Hezbollah, Hamas, and Palestinian Islamic Jihad.

== Iran ==
Supreme Leader Ali Khamenei declared three days of mourning, and vowed to take "harsh revenge" against the U.S.

President Hassan Rouhani also said that Iran "will take revenge".

Foreign Minister Mohammad Javad Zarif posted on Twitter that the attack was "an extremely dangerous and foolish escalation" and released a statement saying that "the brutality and stupidity of American terrorist forces in assassinating Commander Soleimani ... will undoubtedly make the tree of resistance in the region and the world more prosperous." But in the leaked audiotape, he declared that "by assassinating [Soleimani] in Iraq, the United States delivered a major blow to Iran, more damaging than if it had wiped out an entire city in an attack".

Majid Takht-Ravanchi, the Permanent Representative of Iran to the United Nations, wrote in an official letter to the United Nations Security Council and Secretary-General António Guterres: "by any measure, is an obvious example of State terrorism and, as a criminal act, constitutes a gross violation of the fundamental principles of international law, including, in particular, those stipulated in the Charter of the United Nations".

Minister of Information and Communications Technology Mohammad-Javad Azari Jahromi compared Trump to ISIL, Hitler, and Genghis Khan, also calling him a "terrorist in a suit."

Former IRGC commander Mohsen Rezaee posted that "[Soleimani] joined his martyred brothers, but we will take vigorous revenge on America." Soleimani's daughter Zeinab Soleimani said during her father's funeral that "the families of the American soldiers in western Asia will spend their days waiting for the death of their children."

Red flag hoisted on Jamkaran Mosque. Video from FARS News Agency.

On 4 January, a red flag unfurled above the dome of Jamkaran Mosque in response to the airstrike, that according to Washington Examiner, symbolizes vengeance. While being broadcast on Iran's Channel One, the eulogist at Soleimani's funeral procession addressed a crowd during processions at Mashhad and called for a bounty of US$80 million (roughly US$1 for every Iranian citizen) to be placed on Donald Trump.

On 7 January, Iran's parliament approved a €200 million increase in the Quds Force's budget, to be used in two months. Iran's parliament also voted to declare the United States Armed Forces to be a terrorist organization.

On 8 January, Iran's President Hassan Rouhani praised Qasem Soleimani's merits on fighting ISIS, al-Nusra and al-Qaeda and announced, Iran's "final answer to his assassination will be to kick all US forces out of the region".

The following are reactions from Iranian officials and Soleimani’s family to his death. To Soleimani’s daughter: “Everyone is grieving and grateful to your father. This gratitude stems from his immense sincerity, for hearts are in God’s hands. Without sincerity, people’s hearts would not have been with him in this way. May God bestow His blessings upon all of us.” Described as an “honorable” commander who “courageously fought for years against the evils and bandits of the world.” “His ascension to God does not mark the end of his path or mission; rather, a forceful revenge awaits the criminals.” “The loss of our selfless and dear general is bitter, but the continued struggle and the ultimate victory will make life more bitter for the murderers and criminals.” —January 3, 2020, in a statement reported by Fars News Agency.

=== Reactions from Iranian opposition groups ===
- The People's Mojahedin Organization of Iran, an exiled Iranian militant group, welcomed the killing of Soleimani. Maryam Rajavi, the head of the National Council of Resistance of Iran (NCRI), stated that the killing is an "irreparable blow for the regime of the mullahs" while she accused Soleimani of being "one of the biggest criminals in Iran's history" and "personally implicated in the massacre of thousands of people in the region".
- The exiled Tudeh Party of Iran condemned the airstrike, while simultaneously criticizing the Iranian regime for intervening in both Iraq and Lebanon.
- Reza Pahlavi, heir to the throne of the Shah of the defunct Imperial State of Iran, strongly backed the airstrike and killing of Soleimani saying that it is "a breakthrough that is positive for the region."

== Iraq ==
Outgoing Prime Minister Adel Abdul Mahdi condemned the attack, calling it an assassination and stating that the strike was an act of aggression and a breach of Iraqi sovereignty which would lead to war in Iraq and declared three days of national mourning. He said the strike violated the agreement on the presence of U.S. forces in Iraq and that safeguards for Iraq's security and sovereignty should be met with legislation. The prime minister said the U.S. strike violated terms of the U.S. military presence in Iraq, adding that U.S. troops were exclusively in Iraq to train Iraqi security forces and fight Islamic State within the framework of a global coalition.

Abdul Mahdi said in a statement the U.S. air strike was "a dangerous escalation that will light the fuse of a destructive war in Iraq, the region. The media office of the Iraqi military's joint operations forces posted a photo of a destroyed vehicle on fire after the attack. "The assassination of an Iraqi military commander who holds an official position is considered aggression on Iraq ... and the liquidation of leading Iraqi figures or those from a brotherly country on Iraqi soil is a massive breach of sovereignty," Iraqi Prime Minister Adel Abdul Mahdi said. …Abdul Mahdi called on parliament to convene an extraordinary session to "take legislative steps and necessary provisions to safeguard Iraq's dignity, security and sovereignty."

The speaker of Iraq's parliament Mohammed al Halbousi vowed to "put an end to U.S. presence" in Iraq. On January 5 in reaction to the airstrikes the Iraqi parliament passed a bill calling for the expulsion of US troops from the country.

Muqtada al-Sadr, leader of the Sadrist Movement and the Saraya al-Salam militia, ordered his followers to "prepare to defend Iraq". He later called for ceasefire.

After the Iranian missile attack on U.S. forces in Iraq, Iran-backed Iraqi militia commander Qais Khazali said that Iran had made its initial response for the United States killing its top general, and it was now time for Iraq to give its initial response to the assassination of Popular Mobilization Forces's deputy commander Abu Mahdi al-Muhandis.

On 24 January, several hundred thousand Iraqis protested against U.S. military presence in Iraq and called for them to leave the country after Shia cleric Muqtada al-Sadr called for a "Million Man March." Iraqi President Barham Salih tweeted, "Iraqis insist on a state with complete sovereignty that will not be breached."

In January 2021, a judge in Baghdad's court issued an arrest warrant for President Donald Trump.

Sheikh Kataib, a leader of Iran-backed Kata'ib Sayyid al-Shuhada militia said Soleimani's assassination had “greatly affected” the morale of Shia-aligned outfits across the region, told this reporter during a trip to Baghdad in 2022, “Qassem would come and say hello to the leaders. But then he also said hello to the cooks and cleaners; he would kiss them. He was a supporter of the oppressed. These men died poor when they could have earned so much.”

Abdul Mahdi, whose government was supported by Iran and its Iraqi allies, called Soleimani and Muhandis important figures in the victory over the Islamic State (ISIS). Iraq's Popular Mobilisation Forces (PMF), a group of mostly Iran-backed Shi'ite militias led by Muhandis, helped Iraqi security forces regain control of areas taken by ISIS. The PMF was later officially included in Iraq's armed forces. Since October 1, thousands of Iraqis have protested against several issues, including the militias and their Iranian supporters who back Abdul Mahdi's government.

== United States ==
U.S. President Donald Trump delivers remarks on the airstrikes, Mar-a-Lago, 3 January 2020.

President Trump tweeted pictures of the American flag shortly before the United States confirmed its responsibility for the attacks, at 3:00 a.m. GMT on 3 January 2020 (6:00 am in Baghdad). In a subsequent public statement he said he had authorized the strike because Soleimani was plotting "imminent and sinister attacks" on Americans. He added, "We took action last night to stop a war. We did not take action to start a war." He also said that he did not seek a regime change in Iran. On 4 January, Trump tweeted that 52 Iranian targets (representing the 52 American hostages in the 1979–1981 Iran hostage crisis) had been selected if Iran "strikes any Americans, or American assets". In the same tweet, Trump also mentioned targeting Iranian "cultural sites", an act that would constitute a violation of international law under the Hague Convention, but not if used by Iran as cover for weapons that could target U.S. interests. Trump insisted he would not hesitate to destroy such targets even after some said it could be considered a war crime.

On the day of the strike, U.S. secretary of state Mike Pompeo asserted the attack was ordered by Trump to disrupt an "imminent attack" by Soleimani operatives, although subsequent reports on that rationale were mixed. After the strike, Pompeo tweeted a video he said showed Iraqis celebrating Soleimani's death on the streets of Baghdad, although the video showed no more than 40 individuals among a crowd of thousands and the minor demonstration ended within two minutes. In a tweet, former National Security Advisor John Bolton called the airstrike "a long in the making, decisive blow against Iran's malign Quds Force activities worldwide ... Hope this is the first step to regime change in Tehran." Vice President Mike Pence claimed without evidence that Soleimani was involved in the 9/11 attacks.

US Ambassador to the United Nations Kelly Craft wrote a letter to the UN Security Council in which she said that the act was one of self-defense. At the same time, she wrote in the letter that the US stood "ready to engage without preconditions in serious negotiations with Iran, with the goal of preventing further endangerment of international peace and security or escalation by the Iranian regime."

When asked about the possible responses that Iran could take to this action, former Deputy Secretary of Defense Michael Mulroy said that the IRGC Quds Force has a worldwide reach and that targets would include American civilians, and that Iraq might decide to expel U.S. forces in their country. Former Defense Secretary and CIA Director Leon Panetta warned that the U.S. is closer to war with Iran than at any time in the last 40 years.

Characterizing the attack as "murder", "assassination", "act of war", or something else proved controversial. Some critics of Trump described the attack as a wag the dog incident to distract from impeachment proceedings, parallel to the bombing of Iraq, Afghanistan, and Sudan by president Bill Clinton during his own impeachment process, which had itself been seen as reminiscent of the contemporaneous film Wag the Dog. In 2011 and 2012, Trump asserted that President Obama would start a war with Iran to improve his reelection chances.

According to a Facebook spokesperson, Instagram and its parent company Facebook were picking up posts "that voice support for slain Iranian commander Qasem Soleimani to comply with US sanctions".

=== Domestic U.S. political reactions ===
Republican Senate leader Mitch McConnell addresses the U.S. Senate, 3 January 2020

Democratic Senate leader Chuck Schumer addresses the U.S. Senate, 3 January 2020

American politicians reacted along party lines. Republicans generally supported the mission, while Democrats blamed Soleimani "for the deaths of hundreds of American servicemen during the Iraq war" but questioned the wisdom, timing, and motivation for the attack.

Senate Majority Leader Mitch McConnell celebrated the attack, referring to Soleimani as "Iran's master terrorist". House of Representatives Speaker Nancy Pelosi referred to the strike as "provocative and disproportionate", and introduced a "war powers resolution" requiring Trump's administration to end hostilities with Iran not approved by Congress within 30 days.

All the Democratic candidates for the 2020 U.S. presidential election, political challengers to Trump, largely condemned the airstrike. Former Vice President Joe Biden warned of further escalation and said that Trump "just tossed a stick of dynamite into a tinderbox". Senator Bernie Sanders said that "Trump's dangerous escalation brings us closer to another disastrous war in the Middle East that could cost countless lives and trillions more dollars." Senator Elizabeth Warren described the attack as a wag the dog, an attempt by Trump to distract from the impeachment process through an act of war. South Bend, Indiana Mayor Pete Buttigieg said the Trump administration must plan for possible consequences before taking action, must ensure its action is supported by its allies, and must take only actions that will benefit U.S. national interests and stability in the region. Representative Tulsi Gabbard called the airstrike an act of war by President Trump and a violation of the U.S. Constitution, arguing that the president does not have Congressional authorization for such an act. At the seventh Democratic Party presidential debate hosted by CNN and the Des Moines Register at Drake University in Des Moines, Iowa, the candidates Bernie Sanders, Tom Steyer, and Pete Buttigieg favored a complete U.S. disengagement from the region, while Joe Biden and Amy Klobuchar defended retaining special forces in Iraq. Meanwhile, President Trump used the killing of Soleimani to promote his reelection campaign, in which he defended the action at rallies in Toledo and Milwaukee.

Sanders, along with Representative Ro Khanna, announced that they would be introducing legislation to prevent the use of Pentagon funding for military action in Iran without Congressional approval. Tim Kaine (D-VA), a member of the Senate Armed Services and Foreign Affairs Committees, said, "Congress must act to stop President Trump from entangling America in yet another unnecessary war in the Middle East." In June 2019, Kaine had introduced a resolution to require Congressional authorization before going to war with Iran, and on 3 January 2020 he introduced a similar resolution. Kaine's counterpart, Mark Warner (D-VA) said it is not clear that the Trump administration has a clear plan to prevent another endless war in the Middle East.

Senator Rand Paul (R-KY) criticized the airstrikes, saying that it will increase tensions between the two countries. Fox News's Tucker Carlson criticized the killing and "chest-beaters" who promote foreign interventions, particularly Senator Ben Sasse (R-NE). He asked, "By the way, if we're still in Afghanistan, 19 years, sad years, later, what makes us think there's a quick way out of Iran?"

New York City Mayor Bill de Blasio expressed strong concerns about potential retaliatory strikes, putting the police department on high alert, including the potential of bag checks at subway stations and vehicle checks at tunnels and bridges. Mayor Muriel Bowser of Washington, D.C. said she did not see any immediate threats, but she reminded citizens to report any suspicious activities.

President of the Council on Foreign Relations, Richard Haass, called the airstrike potentially "the most significant development" in the region since the Iraq War, and called for the U.S. to prepare for an Iranian retaliation. Oona A. Hathaway, a professor of international law at Yale Law School, evaluated the various legal justifications the Trump Administration gave for the airstrike, compared the attack with similar events of the past and concluded that, "the Soleimani strike defied the U.S. Constitution. If Congress fails to respond effectively, the constitutional order will be broken beyond repair, and the president will be left with the unmitigated power to take the country to war on his own—anywhere, anytime, for any reason."

Medea Benjamin (the founder of anti-war advocacy group Code Pink) and Hillary Mann Leverett (a political risk consultant and former director of Iran affairs at the White House's National Security Council) called the assassination of Soleimani "flatly illegal".

==== Congressional resolution to limit Trump's war powers ====
Some members of the United States Congress, which generally was not consulted or briefed before the Soleimani strike, sought to restrict the president's ability to conduct future military operations against Iran without congressional consent. On 6 January 2020, House Speaker Pelosi announced plans to hold a vote within the week on limiting President Trump's war powers concerning Iran. On 8 January 2020, Pelosi announced that a vote will be held by the entire U.S. House of Representatives on 9 January to limit President Trump's war powers concerning any future escalation of conflict with Iran. The House Rules Committee cleared the way for a full House vote by approving parameters which set up a two-hour debate on 9 January. The House vote is considered significant, as the U.S. Constitution provides that while the president may use the military to defend the country, any declaration of war must be approved by Congress. Trump criticized the effort, arguing that congressional approval should not be needed to militarily engage Iran "because you have to be able to make split-second decisions sometimes."

On 9 January 2020, the U.S. House of Representatives considered the measure and eventually voted 224–194 to approve it. White House Deputy Press Secretary Hogan Gidley criticized the resolution's passage, calling it "just another political move" and an attempt to "hinder the President's authority to protect America and our interests in the region ..." It was unclear if the resolution was binding or non-binding and whether the Senate would ultimately approve it; House Minority Leader Kevin McCarthy called it a "meaningless vote" while Democrats insisted it sent a strong message that Trump must work with Congress on national security.

The constitutionality of the resolution is unclear since the U.S. Supreme Court limited legislative veto with the Immigration and Naturalization Service v. Chadha decision in 1983 in a majority opinion written by Chief Justice Warren E. Burger. Defense Secretary Esper argued that the President has full authority to attack Iran in response to attacks by Iraqi proxy militias under the 2002 Authorization for Use of Military Force Against Iraq and Article II of the Constitution, and has discouraged Congress from adopting the resolution.

On 13 February, the U.S. Senate voted 55–45 to constrain Trump's ability to wage war on Iran without congressional approval. The bipartisan vote for the Iran War Powers Resolution included eight Republican senators. Trump threatened to veto the resolution.

On 14 February, in an unclassified memorandum to Congress, the Trump administration said it was authorised under both the Constitution and the 2002 Authorisation of Use of Military Force Against Iraq. The Chairman of the House Committee on Foreign Affairs Engel said "The 2002 authorisation was passed to deal with Saddam Hussein. This law had nothing to do with Iran or Iranian government officials in Iraq. To suggest that 18 years later this authorization could justify killing an Iranian official stretches the law far beyond anything Congress ever intended," adding that he "looked forward" to Pompeo testifying in a February 28 hearing.

On 11 March, the U.S. House voted 227–186 for the Senate's resolution, sending the Iran War Powers Resolution to the President.

On 6 May, Trump vetoed the Iran War Powers Resolution and issued a statement regarding the veto. The Senate attempted to override the veto the following day, needing at least 67 votes to override. The override failed with a vote of 49–44.

=== U.S. general public ===
An anti-war protest in Washington, D.C., 4 January 2020

Characterization of the attack as "murder", "assassination", or an "act of war", led to some controversy and debate. Jan Goldman of The Citadel, The Military College of South Carolina, a leading expert on the role of ethics in intelligence operations, argued that the attack met the criteria for "assassination", adding that "killing anyone on foreign soil that is not a battlefield could be considered unethical". Peter Singer, Australian moral philosopher and professor of bioethics at Princeton University, concluded that if the attack counts as an act of war, then Trump did not have the authority to order it, otherwise, "as an extrajudicial assassination that was not necessary to prevent an imminent attack, it was both illegal and unethical".

The hashtags #WorldWarIII and #WWIII trended on social media, along with concerns that the military draft might be reinstated. Many Internet memes on the topic became popular on sites such as Twitter and TikTok. The U.S. Selective Service System website crashed with many looking for information on draft requirements and exemptions. The agency attributed the crash to "the spread of misinformation".

Members of Catholic communities in the United States particularly raised concerns about its morality. Sojourners Community leader Jim Wallis called the attack "not justifiable" and "immoral".

Documentary film director and activist Michael Moore opposed the assassination. Hollywood actors Rose McGowan and John Cusack criticized Trump's airstrike, with McGowan describing Americans as "being held hostage by a terrorist regime," while Cusack remarked that Trump was in "full fascist 101 mode."

An Associated Press poll found that only 41% of Americans supported the killing of Soleimani. An USA Today–Ipsos poll, found that 55% of Americans said they believe that the U.S. is less safe because of the killing of Soleimani.

== Global reactions ==
=== Supranational ===
- NATO temporarily suspended its training mission in Iraq on 4 January. A spokesperson said in an emailed statement, "The safety of our personnel in Iraq is paramount. We continue to take all precautions necessary."
- United Nations Secretary-General António Guterres expressed concern over the escalation and called for leaders to "exercise maximum restraint".

=== G20 states ===
- Argentina: The government said they were "worried about the escalating situation in the Middle East". It also said the Argentine people acknowledges terrorism ever since suffering two terrorist attacks in the past (the Israeli embassy attack and AMIA bombing), and urged all parties to diplomacy and restraint. On 4 January 2020, Argentine President Alberto Fernández ordered the armed forces to secure the borders and reinforced security at the main airports, the American airliners and the U.S. embassy in response to the operation.
- Australia: Prime Minister Scott Morrison said he was concerned over the events and calls for calm and de-escalation in the region.
- Brazil's president Jair Bolsonaro said he supports any "initiative against terrorism", also reaffirmed his support for U.S. President Donald Trump in the action. Subsequently, the Brazil's Ministry of Foreign Affairs, in a communiqué, assumed his "support for the fight against the scourge of terrorism ..."
- Canada urged restraint and de-escalation of the tensions, but it also said it has long been concerned by the Islamic Revolutionary Guard Corps' Quds Force, led by Soleimani, whose "aggressive actions have had a destabilizing effect in the region and beyond". However, the Conservative Party of Canada under Andrew Scheer, the opposition party in the House of Commons, welcomed Soleimani's death and stated "Iran's Islamic Revolutionary Guard Corps (IRGC) has long been a tool of repression and violence in Iran and across the world" while further calling Soleimani who "was at the centre of IRGC operations and bear responsibility for violence, destruction and a destabilizing influence across the Middle East." The CPC asked the Justin Trudeau-led Liberal government to label IRGC as a terrorist organization.
- China appealed for restraint from all sides, "especially the United States", stating that China has always opposed the use of force in international relations. During the meeting in Baghdad on 6 January, Zhang Tao, the Chinese Ambassador, said to Iraq's caretaker Prime Minister al-Mahdi that "China is keen to increase security and military cooperation in Iraq".
- France deputy minister for foreign affairs, Amelie de Montchalin, told RTL radio, "We are waking up in a more dangerous world. Military escalation is always dangerous." According to Agnès Callamard, the UN special rapporteur on extrajudicial killing, "the killings of Qassem Suleimani and Abu Mahdi al-Muhandis violates international human rights law". She said the U.S. is required to confirm "the individual targeted constituted an imminent threat to others." Callamard also described the killing of other individuals alongside Soleimani as "unlawful"
- Germany advised that the Middle East has reached "a dangerous escalation point" and the conflict can only be resolved diplomatically. German foreign minister Heiko Maas said that the airstrikes had not "made it easier to reduce tensions", but noted they "followed a series of dangerous Iranian provocations". Part of the German military contingent in Iraq was moved to other countries due to "safety concerns".
- India's Minister of External Affairs & Foreign Affairs Subrahmanyam Jaishankar had expressed serious concerns over ongoing tensions in Iran. He said, "India remains deeply concerned, and will stay in touch." He also had telephonic conversation with both countries' foreign ministers, Mohammad Javad Zarif and U.S. Secretary Mike Pompeo, on the present situation in Middle East, and highlighted India's stakes and concerns. India further urged both countries to be restraint and maintain peace. Shia groups in India also organised protest against the killing of Soleimani in New Delhi, Kargil, Budgam, Lucknow and Pune.
- Indonesia's Ministry of Foreign Affairs issued a statement requesting parties to refrain from further violent actions, and called on Indonesian citizens in Iraq to "remain vigilant".
- Italy's prime minister Giuseppe Conte stated that his government target is to "avoid further escalation". He also added that a "European action is necessary" to prevent that rising tensions could fuel further "terrorism and violent extremism". However, opposition leader Matteo Salvini applauded the killing of Soleimani, whom he called, "one of the most dangerous and pitiless men in the world, an Islamic terrorist, an enemy of the West, of Israel, of rights and of freedoms".
- Japan announced its Prime Minister, Shinzo Abe will visit Saudi Arabia, Oman and the United Arab Emirates between 12 and 15 January. About the killing, Japan expressed concern and that Abe expects to "contribute to peace and stability in the region through diplomatic efforts to ease tensions." The trip was canceled due to the Iranian strikes on a U.S. base in Iraq on 8 January.
- South Korean government was monitoring the security situation of around 1,600 South Koreans living in Iraq.
- Mexico’s government was concerned about the recent events in Iraq and Iran and asked all parties involved to act with restraint and avoid escalating regional tensions.
- Russia's Foreign Minister Sergei Lavrov stated that, "U.S. had embarked illegal power move" and condemned the air strike saying that it believed the incident will raise Middle East tensions. Russian Foreign Ministry spokeswoman Maria Zakharova said that, "Washington was looking to remake the Middle East, a call Moscow would have made in the heady days of the regime change wars that first started in Iraq in 2003 under George W. Bush's 'pre-emptive strike' policy." According to the Russian Ministry of Defense, "Russia has offered Iraq their S-400 air defense system to protect their airspace". Since the start of the country's civil war nearly nine years ago, that was the second time, the Russian president, Vladimir Putin arrived in Damascus meeting with Bashar al-Assad on 7 January.
- Saudi Arabia called for restraint and said the events in Iraq were the result of previous "terrorist acts". During a press conference on 6 January, Foreign Minister Faisal bin Farhan Al Saud stated that Saudi Arabia was "very keen that the situation in the region doesn't escalate any further."
- South Africa's Minister of International Relations and Cooperation, Naledi Pandor, stated: "It is crucial for all sides to remain calm and desist from taking any further action that will exacerbate the already fragile situation. South Africa emphasises its principled view that conflicts should be resolved through political dialogue rather than resorting to the use of force".
- Turkey said that it believed that the air strike increases insecurity and instability in the region and that it was deeply concerned by the rising tensions between the United States and Iran. Turkish President Recep Tayyip Erdoğan expressed his distaste for external interference, which he said destabilizes the region. Erdogan denied Russian media reports that he had described Soleimani as a "martyr" in a phone call with Iranian President Hassan Rouhani.

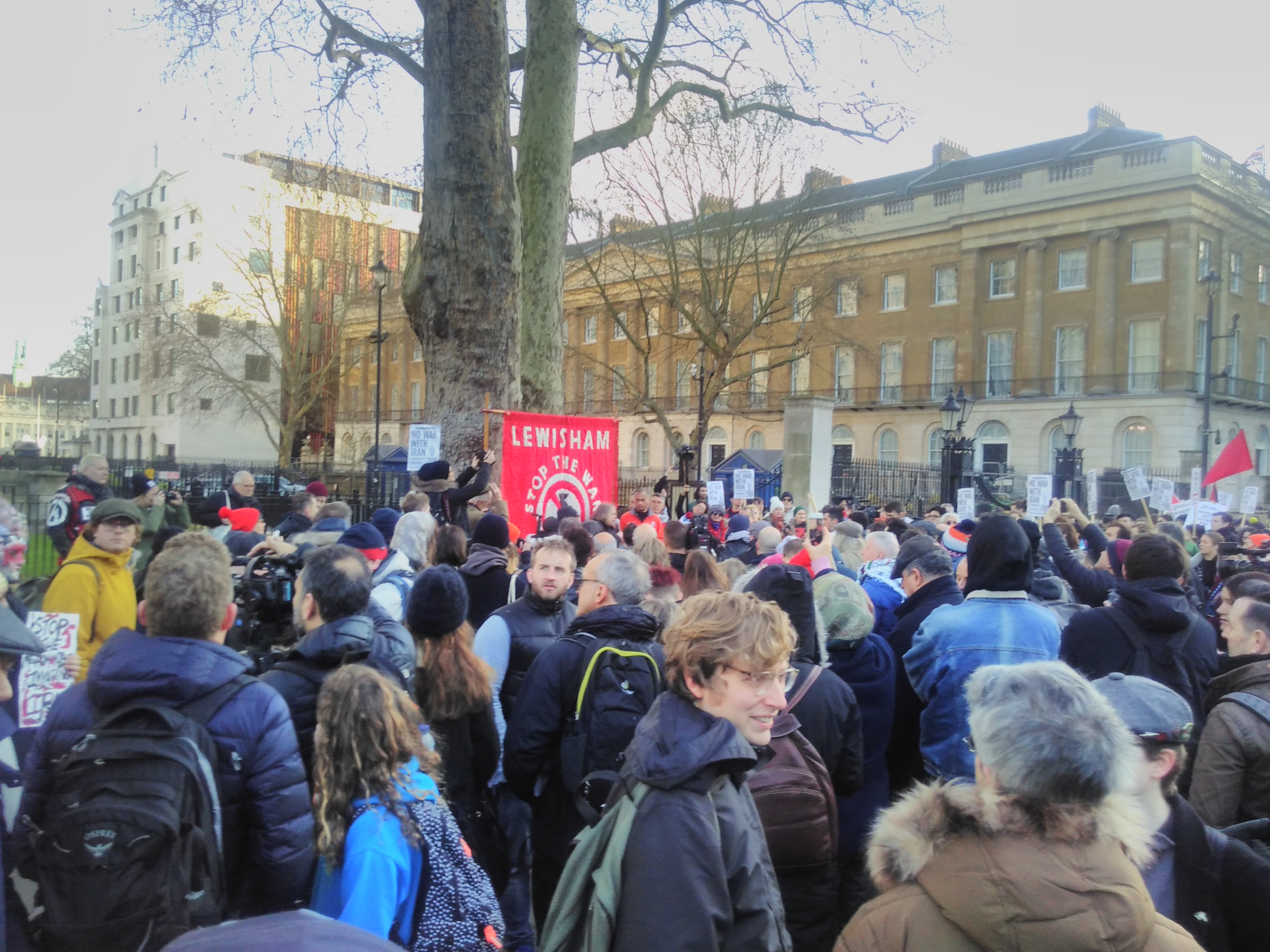
An anti-war protest in London on 4 January 2020

- United Kingdom encouraged all involved parties to react with caution, saying "further conflict is in none of our interests." However, British foreign minister Dominic Raab noted that his government had "always recognized the aggressive threat posed by the Iranian Quds force". Shadow Foreign Secretary Emily Thornberry condemned the actions of the United States government. She said that she shed no tears over the death, but was fearful of escalating tensions in the region.

=== Other UN member states ===
- Afghanistan's government released a statement calling for both parties to prevent further escalations and resolve the crisis through negotiations, and noted that Afghan President Ashraf Ghani had requested to Pompeo that U.S. bases in Afghanistan not be used against other countries, in accordance to the bilateral security agreement between the two countries.
- Albania's Prime Minister Edi Rama stated that "as a country which recognized a while ago Iran's nefarious activity against the free world, and took clear distance from it, Albania cannot but strongly approve the stance of the US president towards a malicious activist of Teheran's regime. We stand firm with the US and hope everyone does so." Later in the week Ayatollah Ali Khamenei announced that Albania was a "small, diabolical country", referring in part to the presence of MEK political refugees in Albania.
- Armenia's Foreign Ministry stated: "We are deeply concerned about the recent events in Baghdad, which also led to human casualties. They can further increase the threat to peace in the region and destabilize the situation in the Middle East and beyond. Armenia is in favor of defusing the situation exclusively by peaceful means." Prime Minister Nikol Pashinyan on his Facebook page advised "homegrown politicians who want to spread panic…to sit quietly in their places."
- Azerbaijan's Foreign Minister Elmar Mammadyarov discussed over the telephone with Iranian Foreign Minister Zarif issues of growing tension in light of recent events in the region. "The Azerbaijani side calls on all parties involved to refrain from violence and to be committed to commitments to strengthen regional security. Minister Mammadyarov expressed deep condolences to the leadership and people of the Islamic Republic of Iran over the death of General Soleimani," the Foreign Ministry said.
- Bahrain called for de-escalation.
- Belarus's Foreign Affairs Minister Vladimir Makei has called on all the parties to show restraint and strive for de-escalation of tensions, and also stressed the need to comply with the principles of international law in order to ensure sustainable international security in global and regional terms.
- Bulgaria called for de-escalation.
- Cuba's government has condemned the airstrike strongly, the use of missiles for targeted assassination as being "in clear violation of International Law and Iraq's sovereignty."
- Denmark's prime minister Mette Frederiksen called it "a really serious situation". She avoided question on whether the killing was right, instead called for de-escalation. Denmark have about 130 troops in Iraq as part of the U.S.-led coalition there, and following the Iraqi parliament's vote to ask them to leave, Minister of Foreign Affairs Jeppe Kofod said: "We are in Iraq to fight ISIL. And that task is not done." Following the subsequent Iranian missile strikes, Denmark temporarily withdrew soldiers to Kuwait, leaving about 30–40 troops on the hit Al-Asad Airbase.
- Egypt's Foreign Ministry appealed to both Iran and the U.S. to avoid any further escalation and was following developments in Iraq with great concern.
- Finland's president Sauli Niinistö commented that the attack could lead to a cycle which will be difficult to stop and that its effects could be felt even outside region.
- Georgian Ministry of Foreign Affairs did not release a statement but David Zalkaliani wrote on his Twitter: "We condemned the recent violent provocative attack on the US Embassy in Baghdad. The United States has a legal right to protect its citizens. It is also time for diplomacy to … ease tensions."
- Greece's Ministry of Foreign Affairs released a statement saying that "Greece is monitoring the developments in Iraq with great concern. The stability of the country and the wider region remains a priority as well as the avoidance of any further escalation. Only this will enable the Iraqi people to return to normal everyday life, free from violence and terrorism. The situation calls for composure and sobriety".
- Israel's prime minister Benjamin Netanyahu praised the air strike, saying that Trump had acted "swiftly, forcefully and decisively". He affirmed Israel's alliance with the U.S., saying "Israel stands with the United States in its just struggle for peace, security and self-defense." Israel will convene its security cabinet on 5 January to discuss increased threats due to the killings. They have warned Hamas and other groups in Gaza Strip against responding. Hamas had earlier expressed "sincere condolences" to Iran's leadership and praised Soleimini's support for the Palestinian struggle. The IDF spokesperson expressed that "Israeli army had no role, this was an American-executed operation."
- Kazakhstan's Foreign Affairs Minister Mukhtar Tleuberdi expressed concern about the aggravation of situation in the region. He urged all parties to exercise restraint to prevent an escalation of the tension and to seek political and diplomatic ways of resolving the conflict.
- Lebanon condemned the attack as a violation of Iraqi sovereignty and an escalation against Iran, while calling for Lebanon and its vicinity to be spared from the repercussions of the incident.
- Malaysia said they were deeply concerned over the situation following the airstrikes and called on all parties concerned to exercise maximum restraint and de-escalate tensions. Mahathir Mohamad, Prime Minister of Malaysia, compared assassination of Soleimani with assassination of Jamal Khashoggi and said it was "illegal" and "immoral".
- Pakistan urged all parties to exercise maximum restraint, engage constructively to de-escalate the situation, and resolve issues through diplomatic means, in accordance with UN Charter and international law. Foreign Minister Shah Mehmood Qureshi said that Pakistan will not allow its territory to be used in a regional conflict. Shia groups in Islamabad and Karachi protested against the strike.
- Philippines President Rodrigo Duterte ordered the country's military to prepare to evacuate Filipino citizens from Iraq and Iran "at any moment's notice". According to Presidential Spokesman Salvador Panelo, Duterte decreed that the Philippines would side with the United States, its close military ally, if Filipinos are "harmed" in the Middle East.
- Qatar's foreign minister, Mohammed bin Abdulrahman Al Thani on a two-day visit to Tehran (3–4 January), said the situation is 'delicate and worrying' and called for easing tensions and calm.
- Slovakia called for de-escalation. Slovak army in Iraq was also relocated to Kuwait.
- Syria's Foreign Ministry strongly condemned the "treacherous, criminal American aggression" that led to the killing of Soleimani, according to a statement released by news agency SANA.
- United Arab Emirates Minister of State for Foreign Affairs Anwar Gargash called for wisdom and political solutions over confrontation and escalation.
- Venezuela condemned the air strike saying that it believed the incident will raise Middle East tensions. Venezuelan National Assembly and disputed interim president Juan Guaidó said that Soleimani "led a criminal and terrorist structure in Iran that for years caused pain to his people and destabilized the Middle East, just as Abu Mahdi al-Muhandis did with Hezbollah". Guaidó also accused Nicolás Maduro of allowing him and his Quds Forces to incorporate their sanctioned banks and companies in Venezuela.
- Yemen's Government praised the Assassination as an "important step to end conflict in the region", while the Iran-backed Houthis condemned the attacks and called for "swift reprisals".

=== Partially-recognized states ===
- Kosovo Prime Minister Ramush Haradinaj announced that "Kosovo stands firm in support of the U.S. in its right to self-defense".

=== Non-state actors ===
- African National Congress secretary-general, Ace Magashule, issued a statement describing the killing of Soleimani as an act of "international terrorism" by the United States and appealed "for maximum restraint" so as encourage a peaceful outcome. Magashule called on the United Nations to take action against the American "act of international terrorism."
- Combined Joint Task Force – Operation Inherent Resolve issued a press release suggesting military activities beyond protecting their own personnel would be paused. "We are now fully committed to protecting the Iraqi bases that host Coalition troops. This has limited our capacity to conduct training with partners and to support their operations against Daesh and we have therefore paused these activities, subject to continuous review."
- Hamas, the de facto government of the Gaza Strip, sent condolences upon Soleimani's death and condemned the airstrikes. On 4 January, hundreds in Gaza Strip, joined by leaders of Hamas and the Palestinian Islamic Jihad faction, mourned Soleimini's death. Israeli and American flags were placed on the ground for people to step on, and then the flags were burned.
- Hezbollah Secretary General Hassan Nasrallah said that "the shoe of Qassem Soleimani is worth the head of Trump and all American leaders", adding that the response must be the expulsion of U.S. forces from the region.
- Islamic State of Iraq and the Levant has praised the killing of Soleimani and described the general's demise as an act of divine intervention that benefitted jihadists.
- Taliban in Afghanistan condemned the killing of Soleimani, describing it as "American adventurism" and hailing Soleimani as a "great warrior".
- National Coalition for Syrian Revolutionary and Opposition Forces welcomed Soleimani's death, a man they blame for thousands of deaths in the nearly nine-year-old civil war.

=== Financial markets ===
Global oil prices rose moderately in reaction to Soleimani's death to heights not seen for three months, before falling back. Arms company stocks (Northrop Grumman, Lockheed Martin and Raytheon) also rose in the wake of the event.

== Demonstrations ==
A number of anti-war rallies were held in more than 30 U.S. cities were set by Code Pink and the ANSWER Coalition for Saturday night, 4 January, asking the withdrawal of U.S. troops from Iraq. Thousands marched in 70 cities across the country in New York City, Chicago, Washington, D.C. and others. Similar demonstrations took place in London, Berlin, Prague, Moscow, Vancouver, Toronto, Ottawa, Montreal, Istanbul, Sana'a, Islamabad, Karachi, Lahore, Tokyo, Seoul, Kargil, Budgam, New Delhi, Lucknow and Pune.

In Los Angeles, where a large number of Iranian Americans reside, praised the death of Soleimani while celebrations took place in Baghdad, Toronto and Idlib.

On 3 January 2021, thousands of Iraqis demanded American forces to withdraw from the country during protests in Liberation Square, Baghdad, a year after the assassination of Qasem Soleimani and Abu Mahdi al-Muhandis. The anniversary of their deaths in Baghdad was also marked in Iran as well as by supporters in Syria, Lebanon, Yemen and other Middle East countries.

Following the assassination of Qasem Soleimani, the people of Kashmir held protests in response to the attack, and to condemn this assassination. A commemoration ceremony for Soleimani was held in Syria (Damascus) near the Shrine of Zaynab, attended by a number of people, and also Latakia saw a gathering of people condemning the U.S. action.

=== Demonstrations in Iran ===
Demonstrations or funerals in cities in Iran such as: Tehran, Mashhad, Tabriz, Shiraz, Isfahan, Kerman, Arak, Karaj, Rasht, Ahvaz, Yasuj, Qazvin, Hamedan, Qom, Semnan, Kermanshah, Sanandaj, Ardabil, Sari Birjand, Kerman, Rasht, Bojnord, Urmia, Ilam, Bandar Abbas, etc.

== See also ==
- Reactions to the assassination of Ali Khamenei
