= University of Bojnord =

Public university in Bojnord, Iran

Coordinates: 37.4352°N 57.2958°E

- دانشگاه بجنورد; Dāneshgāh-e Bojnord
- University of Bojnord (UB) coat of arms
- Motto: میاسای ز آموختن یک زمان
- Motto in English: Rest not a moment from learning
- Type: Public
- Established: 2005
- Affiliations: FUIW
- Chancellor: Mohammad Sheikhzadeh
- Administrative staff: 90
- Students: 4400
- Undergraduates: 4000
- Postgraduates: 400
- Location: Bojnord, Iran
- Colours: Blue
- Website: ub.ac.ir
- Location within Iran

The University of Bojnord is a public university located in Bojnord, Iran.

As the grand university of the province, university of Bojnord was established in October 2005 at the center of North Khorasan, Bojnord, in order to fulfill its main mission of educating young people in different levels and fields of study in line with the programs approved by the Ministry of Science, Research and Technology.

The approval for the establishment of the University of Bojnord, with four faculties of Engineering, Humanities, Arts and Sciences was issued by the Ministry of Science, Research and Technology at 1383/11/11 (01/31/2005) under the letter No. 22/8621. Thus, on October 200 University of Bojnord enrolled 210 students in three fields of study, as the beginning step.

In the academic year 2019-2020, about 4600 students studied under the tuition of 172 faculty members in 53 academic fields (27 undergraduate and 24 postgraduate degrees).
