= Mostafa Tabrizi =

Iranian politician (b. 1946)

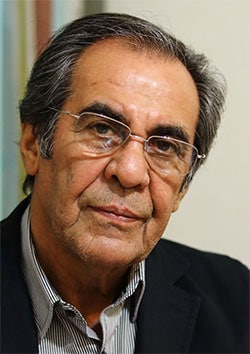
- Tabrizi in 2018

Member of the Parliament of Iran
- In office 28 May 1980 – 27 May 1984
- Constituency: Bojnourd
- Majority: 56,949 (59.10%)

Personal details
- Born: 15 March 1946 (age 80) Bojnourd, Imperial State of Iran
- Occupation: politician

Mostafa Tabrizi (Persian: مصطفی تبریزی; born 15 March 1946 in Bojnourd) is a psychologist and counselor and reformist politician who was formerly represented Bojnourd constituency in the first term of the Parliament of Iran in the Islamic Consultative Assembly.

He is a professor at Allameh Tabatabai University and the director of Roozbeh Counseling Center. He was also the first representative of Bojnourd in the Islamic Consultative Assembly after the 1979 Iranian Revolution.
