= 2026 May Day protests =

International protests on May 1

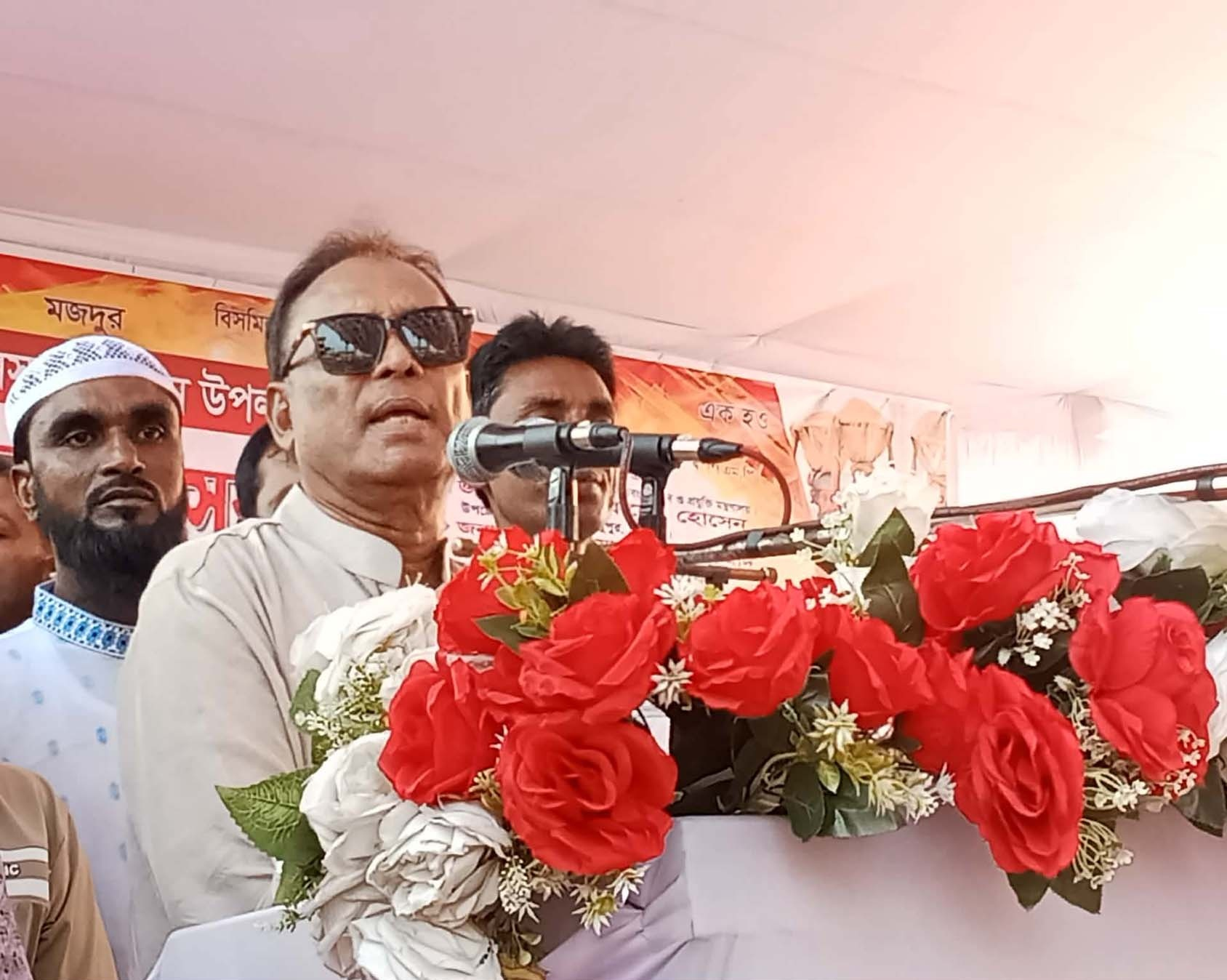
Fakir Mahbub Anam Swapan speaking in Tangail at an International Workers' Day event

The 2026 May Day protests were held internationally on May 1, 2026, as part of International Workers' Day. Demonstrations were held in various countries, including Colombia, Cuba, France, Germany, United States, Thailand, Turkey, Pakistan and Venezuela.

== Protests ==
=== Cuba ===
Workers in Cuba celebrated International Worker's Day and protested the Cuban government and the United States' blockcade against Venezuela.

=== Philippines ===
A Labour Day rally organized by labour group Kilusang Mayo Uno was held in Manila, Philippines. During the rally, protesters attempted to storm the U.S. Embassy to demand an end to the Iran war and clashed with police, injuring seven officers. Among the seven officers injured is a 26-year-old patrolman who had been punched in the head during the stand-off, resulting in a skull and wrist injury.

=== United States ===
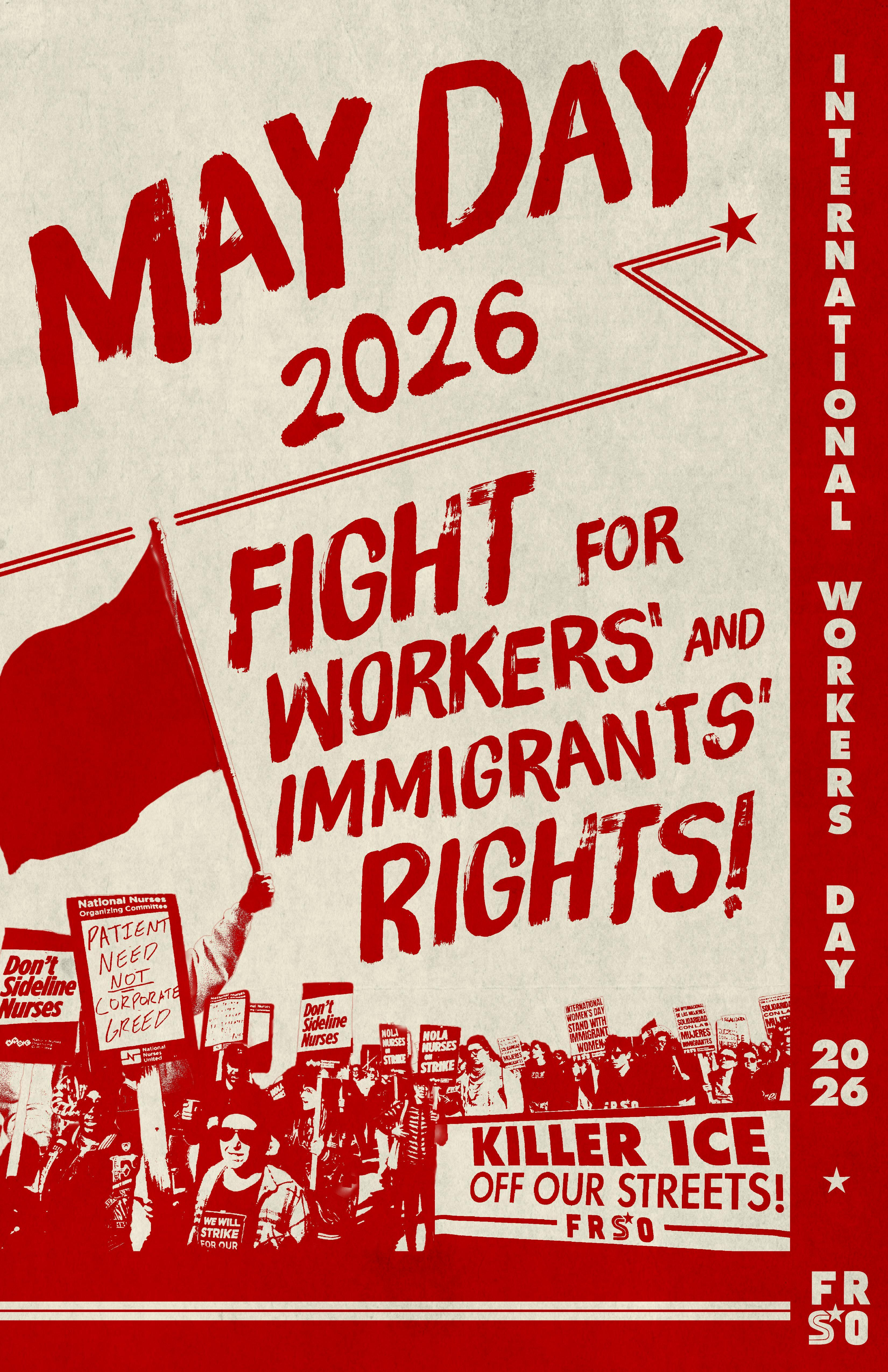
Flyer for a May Day protest in the United States by Freedom Road Socialist Organization

Protests and demonstrations were held in the United States to call for peace, higher wages and better working conditions, and against the Iran war and the global energy and fuel crisis caused by the war. An "economic blackout" was organized by a coalition of hundreds of organizations around the country, working under the banner of May Day Strong. Over 5,000 demonstrations have been held in the U.S against president Donald Trump and his administration, including the Iran war and immigration policies including tactics by ICE.

==== Locations ====
- Chicago, Illinois
- Los Angeles, California
- New York City, New York
- Philadelphia, Pennsylvania
- Portland, Oregon
- San Francisco, California
- Washington, D.C.

In connection with these efforts, the slogan “no school, no work, no shopping” was used to describe participation in the one-day boycott and related protest actions.

=== Thailand ===
Labour groups marched to the Government House of Thailand to submit their nine demands, including a call to raise the minimum wage to 712 THB per day.

=== Turkey ===
Police arrested at least 570 people and use tear gas to disperse demonstrators in Istanbul, access to Taksim Square was blocked to prevent marches.

=== Pakistan ===
In Lahore, rallies were held under the All Pakistan Federation of Trade Unions, with workers demanding wage increases, labour-law enforcement, workplace safety, and removal of recruitment bans. In Islamabad, The News reported PTUDC activists protesting for labour demands on May 1.

== See also ==
- 2025 May Day protests
