= Aladagh Mountains =

Mountain range in Iran

- Map of Iran with Aladagh Mountains in northeast

Highest point
- Peak: Mount Shahjahan
- Elevation: 3,032 m (9,948 ft)

The Aladagh Mountains or the Aladagh Range refers to a mountain range situated in the southeastern section of Iran's North Khorasan province, southeast of the Caspian Sea. The range is located 25 kilometres south of Bojnurd, the capital city of North Khorasan. The Aladagh Mountains merge with the Alborz Mountains in the west and then run southeastwards in a northwest-southeast direction. The highest peak of the range is Mount Shahjahan with an elevation of 3,032 metres (9,948 ft). This peak is located about 35 kilometres (22 mi) east of Esfarayen, almost in southeastern part of North Khorasan Province.

== Etymology ==
Linguistically, the word Aladagh comes from the Turkic branch of the Altaic language family (- and, more specifically, from the Khorasani Turkic language ) and consists of two parts, ala and dagh /dag. Ala means "variegated", "patchwork", "particoloured " or "speckled" and dagh means "mountain", and therefore the word Aladagh means "(the) variegated or speckled mountain (range)".

== Geology ==
Geologically, the mountains were mainly uplifted in the Alpine orogeny during the Neogene and especially in the Miocene, although the orogenic phase continued in the Pliocene. The range is made chiefly of Jurassic rocks in the western, south-central, eastern and southeastern parts, with a smaller portion of Paleozoic rocks in the north-central section.

== Climatology ==
The Aladagh Mountain Range consists of high mountains situated far from the temperate mediterranean climate of the northwestern and western mountains of Iran. Aside from the highest section of the central Elburz that has a cold mountain climate, even the Elburz Mountain Range has a generally Mediterranean climate in the eastern, central, and Western parts.
