= Reactions to the assassination of Ali Khamenei =

Reactions to 2026 assassination

The assassination of Iran's supreme leader, Ali Khamenei, on 28 February 2026, during joint United States–Israeli airstrikes on Tehran, prompted official mourning in Iran, condemnations and calls for restraint from foreign governments and international organizations, and demonstrations among Shia communities abroad.

Iranian state-affiliated media described his assassination as a martyrdom, while Iranian security and military institutions publicly vowed retaliation. Outside Iran, reactions included official statements, rallies and vigils, and, in some cases, violence at protests, particularly in Pakistan and Iraq. Some Iranian diaspora communities and anti-Islamic Republic activists also celebrated his death.

The assassination occurred during a broader regional conflict. In the following days, Iran launched retaliatory strikes across several Gulf states hosting U.S. assets, attacks were reported on critical infrastructure, governments carried out emergency measures including evacuations, and oil prices rose above $100 per barrel amid disruptions to production and shipping through the Strait of Hormuz.

During the subsequent power transition, Iran's Assembly of Experts selected Khamenei's son, Mojtaba Khamenei, as the next supreme leader. The decision prompted official calls for unity in Iran and drew international commentary and criticism.

== Background ==
Khamenei had served as Iran's supreme leader since 1989. On 28 February 2026, during the first day of a major United States–Israeli strikes against Iran, he was killed in his compound. Iranian state broadcasting later confirmed his death in the early hours of 1 March 2026, and the Iranian cabinet announced an extended period of national mourning and public holidays.

== Domestic ==
Iranian state media announced 40 days of mourning and a series of public holidays following confirmation of Khamenei's death. They described the killing as martyrdom and stated that Khamenei's political and religious path would continue after his death. Iranian president Masoud Pezeshkian described the killing as a "great crime" and said that it would not go unanswered.

Public mourning gatherings were reported in Tehran and elsewhere. Supporters of Khamenei mourned his death near the Imam Reza shrine in Mashhad; videos show several people crying and wailing as others appear collapsed on the floor in grief. On 1 March, crowds assembled in Enghelab Square, where participants were described as wearing black, waving Iranian flags, and carrying portraits of Khamenei. Videos were reported showing thousands of people in Yasuj and Isfahan mourning his death, with similar scenes being reported in Shiraz and the province of Lorestan. During the public mourning gatherings, a red Shia flag of revenge was raised at the Jamkaran Mosque in Qom after the assassination, which is a signal of retaliation in the context of Shia symbolism and state-aligned rhetoric. The Islamic Revolutionary Guard Corps publicly pledged retaliation and blamed the United States and Israel for what it described as Khamenei's murder.

Reactions within Iranian society were not uniform. Some accounts described celebrations by certain Iranians inside and outside the country alongside official mourning and pro-government gatherings. Following the initial announcements of Khamenei's death, celebrations were heard in the capital, and videos of celebrations in cities like Isfahan, Karaj, Kermanshah, Qazvin, Sanandaj, Shiraz, and Izeh circulated online. In Dehloran, people were filmed cheering as a statue of Khamenei was toppled. Security forces were also deployed to prevent an uprising, with footage showing them opening fire on celebrants in the streets. Exiled crown prince Reza Pahlavi, eldest son of the last shah of Iran Mohammad Reza Pahlavi and noted dissident against the Islamic Republic regime, unilaterally declared the "end of the Islamic Republic" shortly following Khamenei's death. Pahlavi later said Khamenei's death is not "the end" and called on Iranians to overthrow the Islamic Republic by preparing for "widespread and decisive presence in the streets." Maryam Rajavi, co-leader of the dissident group MEK, released a statement on her website hailing the death of Khamenei as the "end of religious tyranny" and the "collapse of the Velayat-e Faqih regime", calling for a transitional government that excludes mullahs and monarchists, and saying that MEK does not seek foreign intervention in Iran.

President Trump announces the death of Ali Khamenei at Mar-a-Lago on 1 March 2026

Forty days after his death, large-scale memorial ceremonies were held in Tehran and other major cities across Iran. The main gathering took place in the capital, where large crowds participated in organized mourning processions, religious ceremonies, and public demonstrations. Reuters reported that hundreds of thousands of people took part in the main march in Tehran, while state and international media described nationwide participation across multiple cities.

== International ==
Reports of Khamenei's assassination were followed by demonstrations in a number of countries across Asia, the Middle East, and Europe. Reactions varied by location: in some cities, people gathered for mourning rallies and protests against the United States and Israel, while in others smaller groups assembled to express support for the strikes. Celebration rallies were also held worldwide by the Iranian diaspora after news of Khamenei's death. Reports of celebrations of Khamenei's death were censored in China.

Across the United States, hundreds of demonstrators gathered in cities including Washington, D.C., New York, Los Angeles, Atlanta, Chicago, and Boston, to protest the US–Israeli strikes.

In India, thousands nationwide joined protests in outcry. Prayer meetings and widespread demonstrations were organized by members of Shia Muslim communities in Jammu and Kashmir, New Delhi and other areas. Some participants carryied portraits of Khamenei and Iranian flags, and were condemning the attacks. Mourning and protest rallies were held across Shia-populated areas of India, especially in Jammu and Kashmir, Lucknow, and Kargil. In Jammu and Kashmir, the Shia Shariat Association announced a period of public mourning for 40 days and asked their followers to celebrate the day by hoisting black flags and organizing religious activities. Protest rallies were also held in the cities of Lucknow and Kargil, with a large number of citizens carrying the pictures of the Iranian leader while expressing solidarity with the people of Iran.

In Bangladesh, a demonstration organized by the Bangladesh Jamaat-e-Islami condemned Khamenei's killing and called for OIC intervention.

In Greece, over 1,300 protesters, rallied in Athens with banners reading "Hands off Iran."

In Baghdad, demonstrators attempted to approach the US embassy, leading to clashes with security forces.

Anti-war protests were held in Rabat, Morocco, while in Kano, Nigeria, Shia Muslims waved Iranian and Palestinian flags and decried US and Israeli actions.

In Pakistan, many condemned the strikes that killed Khamenei and expressed solidarity with Iran. The MMU and various communities launched widespread protests and three-day mourning periods in solidarity with Iran. Demonstrators gathered in major cities voiced opposition to the assassination and called out perceived government complicity. Some protests in Karachi and Gilgit-Baltistan escalated into clashes with security forces, resulting in casualties and prompting temporary curfews and military deployment.

Smaller anti-war demonstrations were also reported in South Korea, Spain, Turkey, and United Kingdom.

=== State actors ===
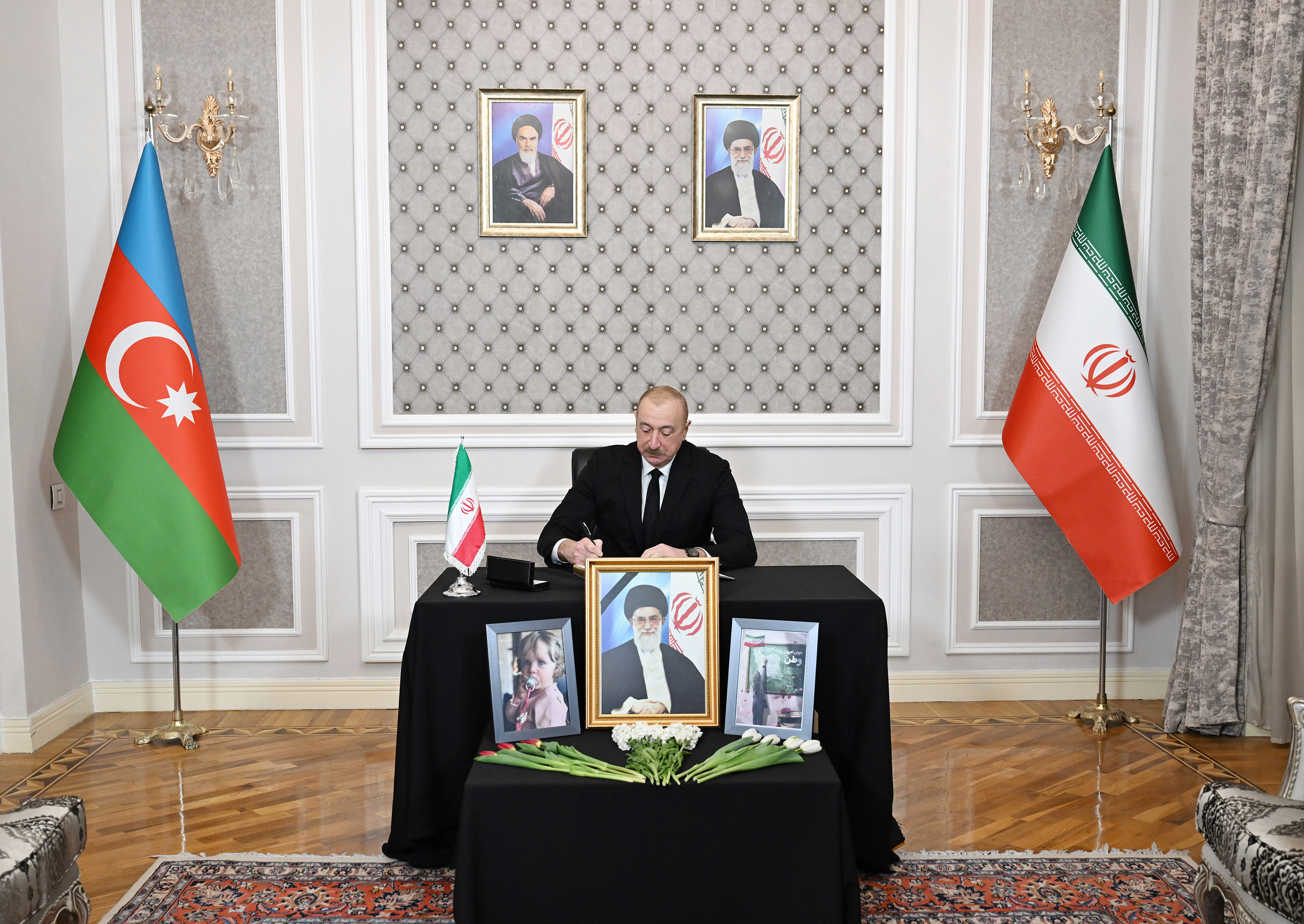
Azerbaijani President Ilham Aliyev at the Iranian Embassy in Azerbaijan to offer condolences

Afghanistan Foreign Minister Amir Khan Muttaqi condemned the attack on Iran and expressed condolences to the Iranian government and public over the targeting of Iran's Supreme Leader Ayatollah Ali Khamenei.

Reactions from other governments and officials were divided. In Argentina, President Javier Milei praised the Israeli–United States military operation and described Khamenei in highly condemnatory terms, while also linking him to Iran's support for terrorism and the 1994 AMIA bombing in Buenos Aires. Foreign Minister Pablo Quirno similarly attributed the AMIA bombing to Iran through Hezbollah and said Khamenei's death and the possible collapse of the Iranian government could bring relief to victims' families. Australian Prime Minister Anthony Albanese said Khamenei would not be mourned and held him responsible for Iran’s missile program, support for proxy groups, and repression of civilians. Armenia's Prime Minister Nikol Pashinyan sent condolences to Iranian President Masoud Pezeshkian over the deaths of Khamenei and other Iranian officials in the reported US-Israeli strikes. Azerbaijan's President Ilham Aliyev also expressed condolences to Pezeshkian, describing Khamenei's death as a major loss for Iran without referring to its cause. Bangladesh's Foreign Ministry said it was saddened by the assassination and characterized it as a violation of international law and norms. In Canada, Prime Minister Mark Carney supported the strikes, including the one reported to have killed Khamenei, while denying Canadian involvement; however, retired Major-General Denis Thompson said, citing sources within CENTCOM, that Canadian personnel at the Combined Aerospace Operations Centre had provided intelligence support during the war.

China strongly condemned the killing, calling it a serious violation of Iran's sovereignty, the UN Charter, and international norms. Foreign Minister Wang Yi said in a call with Russian Foreign Minister Sergey Lavrov that the killing of a sovereign leader and calls for regime change were unacceptable. Belarusian President Alexander Lukashenko condemned the killing as treacherous and offered condolences on behalf of the Belarusian people. Malaysia Prime Minister Anwar Ibrahim condemned Khamenei's assassination but recommended that Iran avoid further escalation. North Korea condemned the attacks on Iran as an "illegal act of aggression", calling it "shameless and gangster-like conduct" by the United States and Israel, which it claimed had chosen to "abuse military force to fulfill their selfish and hegemonic ambitions," though it did not mention the assassination of Khamenei. Russian President Vladimir Putin called the assassination a "cynical murder". He sent his condolences to Pezeshkian and said that "Khamenei's assassination is a violation of all standards of human morality and international law." In Turkey, President Recep Tayyip Erdoğan stated that he was saddened by Khamenei's death and that Turkey will continue diplomatic efforts to "regain peace and stability".

In Africa, Chad's President Mahamat Déby expressed condolences to Iran and solidarity with the Iranian people.

European Union leaders reacted by emphasizing the possibility of political change in Iran. Foreign policy chief Kaja Kallas called it a defining moment in Iranian history and said it opened a path to a different future, while European Commission president Ursula von der Leyen said it created renewed hope for the Iranian people. Estonia Foreign Minister Margus Tsahkna characterized the death of Ayatollah Khamenei as a strategic blow to the Russia–Iran alliance. Finland Foreign Minister Elina Valtonen posted on X that "This opens a window for long-awaited change in the Middle East. Iran's dictatorship has long been a shackle on its own citizens and an obstacle to regional peace", and added "Iran has provided Russia with drones and missiles used in its war of aggression against Ukraine. Its non-compliance with nuclear non-proliferation agreements has been a constant threat to world peace". Latvia Foreign Minister Baiba Braže reacted to the death of Ali Khamenei by saying the world would not mourn him, calling it a relief for the Iranian people and expressing hope for a future free of oppression. Lithuania Foreign Minister Kęstutis Budrys issued a statement regarding the death of Ali Khamenei, stating that the "hope for [a] better future, for [the] Iranian people — but also for Israelis and all of the Middle East — seems to have come closer." Defence Secretary John Healey told Sky News that "few people will mourn" Khamenei's death, describing him as the leader of an evil regime that sponsored terrorist attacks in the West. Reactions among opposition figures were split, with some celebrating Khamenei's killing and others alleging that it violated international law. Austria's Foreign Ministry described his death as opening a possible opportunity for change in Iran, with Foreign Minister Beate Meinl-Reisinger stating that Iranians had suffered under the ruling clerical establishment and that the cycle of violence should end.

India did not issue a condemnation, consistent with its approach in similar past cases, although Foreign Secretary Vikram Misri signed a condolence book a few days later without mentioning any background of Khamenei's demise. In Pakistan, Prime Minister Shehbaz Sharif expressed his condolences about "the martyrdom of His Eminence Ayatollah Seyyed Ali Khamenei" and stood with the Iranian people in their "grief and sorrow."

In Iraq, the government announced three days of mourning after the assassination. Iraqi opposition leader and Shia cleric Muqtada al-Sadr expressed his "sadness and sorrow" on X after Khamenei's death. Grand Ayatollah Ali al-Sistani also offered condolences to the Iranian people and Muslims worldwide, calling on Iranians to preserve unity and "thwart the aggressors' sinister goals".

American, Israeli, and Ukrainian leaders publicly celebrated the killing. Prime Minister Benjamin Netanyahu was the first to report and celebrate the assassination, stating "for 47 years, the Ayatollah regime has chanted 'Death to Israel' and 'Death to America.' It has spilled our blood, murdered many Americans, and slaughtered its own people." Defense Minister Israel Katz celebrated the killing, stating "he who acted to destroy Israel – has been destroyed ... Justice has been served, and the axis of evil has suffered a mortal blow." President Donald Trump, commenting on Khamenei's death, called him "one of the most evil people in history" and announced that the US would continue to bomb Iran. Some members of Congress from the Democratic Party, including Senator John Fetterman, reacted positively to the announcement, while many from the Republican Party, such as Representative Tom Emmer, cheered Trump's post. The official X account of Ukraine celebrated Khamenei's death, writing that "nothing beats the death of a dictator".

=== Non-state actors ===
Hamas released a statement mourning the death of Ayatollah Ali Khamenei, describing him as a source of political, diplomatic, and military support for the Palestinian cause and for armed resistance. It also blamed the United States and Israel for the attack, calling them fully responsible for what it described as aggression against Iranian sovereignty and for the wider regional consequences. The al-Qassam Brigades referred to Khamenei as a principal backer of the so-called Axis of Resistance and its fighters. Hezbollah Secretary-General Naim Qassem condemned the killing as an extreme crime and said Hezbollah would retaliate and continue confronting what he described as aggression. Hezbollah subsequently joined the war by launching attacks on northern Israel. The Houthis' political leadership expressed condolences to the Iranian people. Kurdistan Region President Nechirvan Barzani also offered condolences to Iran's people, government, and leadership, describing Khamenei as both the Supreme Leader of Iran and a prominent religious scholar. Palestinian Islamic Jihad condemned the killing as both a war crime and a treacherous attack.

Polish politician Grzegorz Braun signed a condolence book at Iran’s embassy in Warsaw.

== Analysis ==
The Economist described the killing of Khamenei as an "enormous success" for the United States and Israel, noting that a comparable effort to kill Saddam Hussein during the 2003 invasion of Iraq had taken nine months. It also suggested Khamenei's assassination, framed within Shia concepts of martyrdom, may actually benefit the regime rather than weaken it. Harlan Ullman, chairman of the strategic advisory Killowen Group and adviser to the Atlantic Council has called assassination of Khamenei a "big mistake", writing that US has made him a "martyr".

Julian Borger of The Guardian warned of a "Libya-style collapse" where a fractured, multi-ethnic Iran leads to a massive security vacuum, leading to separatist movements and creating a refugee crisis for the West.

The New York Times wrote that by killing Khamenei, Israel had "crossed a new Rubicon, killing the head of state of a sovereign country—something it had shied away from doing early in the war last June, according to two ... Israeli defense officials." The Atlantic framed the killing of Khamenei as the culmination of a long internal decay, arguing that his regime's collapse stemmed less from foreign firepower than from rot within. According to Graeme Wood, "the best-planned defenses don't count for much if the people you trust to run them are ready to sell you out," casting Khamenei as ultimately undone by betrayal bred by his own system.

Iran International cast the killing of Khamenei as the long-awaited end of "the dictator a nation longed to see gone", framing his death as the closing of an era defined by repression, ideological rigidity, and mass bloodshed, especially the January 2026 massacre. In this telling, his assassination lands at a moment of profound internal crisis, with a hollowed-out system facing succession struggles, public fury, and possible collapse, making his death less a geopolitical shock than the culmination of accumulated domestic illegitimacy. In an article for The Atlantic, Karim Sadjadpour described Khamenei as a rigid guardian of a revolution increasingly disconnected from much of Iranian society, arguing that his anti-Americanism was rooted more in regime preservation than ideology. He concluded by noting the symbolic irony that, after decades defined by hostility toward the United States and Israel, Khamenei was killed in a strike by those same adversaries.

Some analysts argue that Khamenei's death may serve as a powerful symbol for Iran's leadership, uniting supporters and strengthening ideological commitment in the face of external attack. Ali Vaez of the International Crisis Group (ICG) observes that the Khamenei's assassination removes the most pragmatic decision-maker in the system, potentially closing the door on nuclear diplomacy and empowering less predictable hardliners.

Omani mediators have observed that prior to the strike, a peace deal was within reach including Iranian concessions on uranium stockpiles. The assassination is seen by some as a deliberate sabotage of these diplomatic channels. It has also noted that this could bolster hardline elements and reduce prospects for rapid regime change rather than achieving strategic goals for the US and Israel, and will contribute to further regional instability.

Most legal and policy analysts have criticized his assassination as a violation of international law and that it risk normalizing the deliberate killing of foreign leaders.

== See also ==
- Reactions to the assassination of Qasem Soleimani
