= Protests against the 2026 Iran war =

- Part of Reactions to the 2026 Iran war
- "Free Iran Demonstration" opposing the US–Israeli strikes in Washington, D.C., with the demonstrators carrying a large replica of the preamble to the United States Constitution, 28 February 2026
- Date: 28 February 2026 – present (8 months, 2 weeks and 5 days)
- Location: Worldwide
- Caused by: 2026 Iran war
- Methods: Protests; Demonstrations; Riots; Civil disobedience

Parties
Anti-war demonstrators Pro-Iran/Pro-Islamic Republic demonstrators	Security forces (in some locations) Pro-war demonstrators

Casualties and losses
- Pakistan: 26–35 killed, 120+ injured Kenya: 4 killed, 30+ injured Comoros: 1 killed, 5 injured Philippines: 7 police officers injured

Following strikes against Iran on 28 February 2026 by a joint military operation conducted by Israel and the United States against the Government of Iran, including the assassination of Ali Khamenei, the long-time Supreme Leader of Iran, protests opposing the war were held in several countries. In addition to Khamenei's death, the strikes targeted Iranian military sites, nuclear facilities, and government infrastructure, resulting in the deaths of other high-ranking officials.

Protests erupted in multiple countries, with demonstrators condemning the attacks as acts of aggression and calling for an end to foreign intervention, and some expressing support for the government of Iran. In Iran, pro-government rallies occurred in major cities such as Tehran, where crowds gathered to mourn Khamenei and denounce the strikes. Internationally, anti-war groups organized demonstrations in the United States, Europe, and the Middle East. Violence also occurred in some locations, including near U.S. diplomatic facilities in Iraq and Pakistan.

The demonstrations have varied in scale, from hundreds in U.S. cities to thousands in Tehran. In contrast, celebratory demonstrations supporting the strikes, particularly among Iranian diaspora communities opposed to the Islamic Republic, have also occurred but are distinct from these anti-war actions.

== Background ==
Operation Epic Fury, a coordinated Israeli–U.S. military campaign against Iran, was launched on 28 February 2026. The operation was justified by U.S. president Donald Trump as a response to Iran's nuclear program and its suppression of domestic protests in January 2026, which had resulted in thousands of deaths. Iranian state media confirmed Khamenei's death, prompting retaliatory missile strikes by Iran on Israeli and U.S. targets in the region.

The protestors have framed the strikes as violations of international law.

== Involved parties ==
=== Iran ===
In Tehran, pro-government demonstrators marched on 28 February, waving Islamic Republic flags and chanting against the U.S. and Israel. Similar rallies occurred in Yasuj, where crowds mourned Khamenei. State media reported gatherings in Enqelab Square on 1 March.

==== Pro-government rallies ====
Since the onset of the 2026 Iran war, Iranians have held nightly rallies in support of the Iranian government. According to The Guardian, more than 850 pro-government demonstrations had taken place across Iran by March 2026. According to Iranian media, these gatherings have continued for 223 consecutive nights so far, including different cities such as: Tehran, Mashhad, Isfahan, Tabriz, Karaj, Qom, Shiraz, Ahvaz, Kermanshah, Zanjan, etc.

=== Israel ===
On 28 March 2026, anti-war protests broke out across Israel after the Supreme Court ordered police to allow the protests. Police clashed with the protesters at the Habima Square in Tel Aviv despite the court order. 22 people were arrested during protests in twenty locations including Tel Aviv, Haifa, and Jerusalem.

On 4 April, the Israeli High Court of Justice ordered the Israel Police to allow anti-war protests in Israel. The Israel Police forcibly dispersed an anti-war protest at the Habima Square in Tel Aviv, defying the recent high court order. This followed protesters' defiance of a previous order by the Israel Defense Forces to limit gatherings to 150 people.

=== United States ===
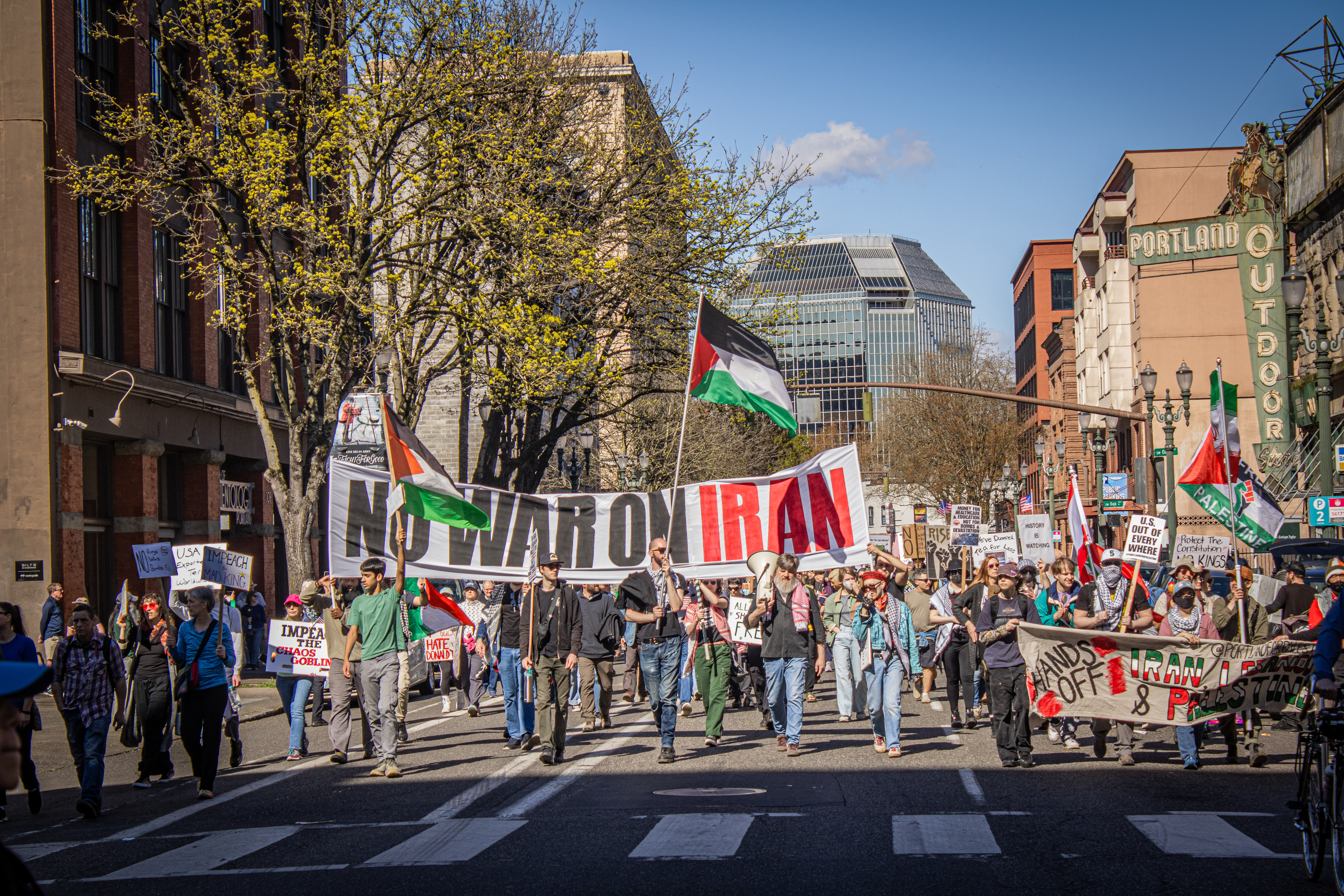
Protesters in Portland, Oregon during the 28 March 2026 No Kings 3 protests

Demonstrations occurred in multiple cities in the United States on 28 February. In Washington, D.C., hundreds protested near the White House. In New York City, pro-Iranian protests took place in Times Square. Protests were also held in other cities including Atlanta, Baltimore, Boston, Chicago, Cincinnati, Denver, Las Vegas, Los Angeles, Miami, Minneapolis, San Francisco, and Philadelphia.

The protests were sponsored mainly by a coalition of left-wing groups critical of the United States' involvement in the strikes. These groups include the A.N.S.W.E.R. Coalition, the 50501 movement, American Muslims for Palestine, The People's Forum, Palestinian Youth Movement, Code Pink, Black Alliance for Peace, Democratic Socialists of America, and the National Iranian American Council, who all gathered to denounce the United States' Iran strikes as illegal and a violation of international law.

Actress and activist Jane Fonda joined anti-war demonstrators sponsored by these groups at a Los Angeles rally. On 28 March, millions of protesters joined the third "No Kings" protest, with anti-war sentiment over the conflict in Iran being one of the major issues.

In contrast, some in the Iranian-American diaspora community held celebration rallies across the country. A poll commissioned by the National Iranian American Council and conducted by Zogby analytics from February 27th to March 5, near the start of the conflict, showed that 49.3% of the Iranian-American diaspora opposed the war and 48.9% supported it (1.8% being unsure). However, a similar survey conducted from 24 to 27 March, a month into the war, found that 66.1% of surveyed Iranian Americans opposed the war and only 32.7% supported it (1.2% being unsure). (Note: The survey's margin of error with 95% confidence was +/- 4.4 percentage points.)

==== Washington D.C. ====
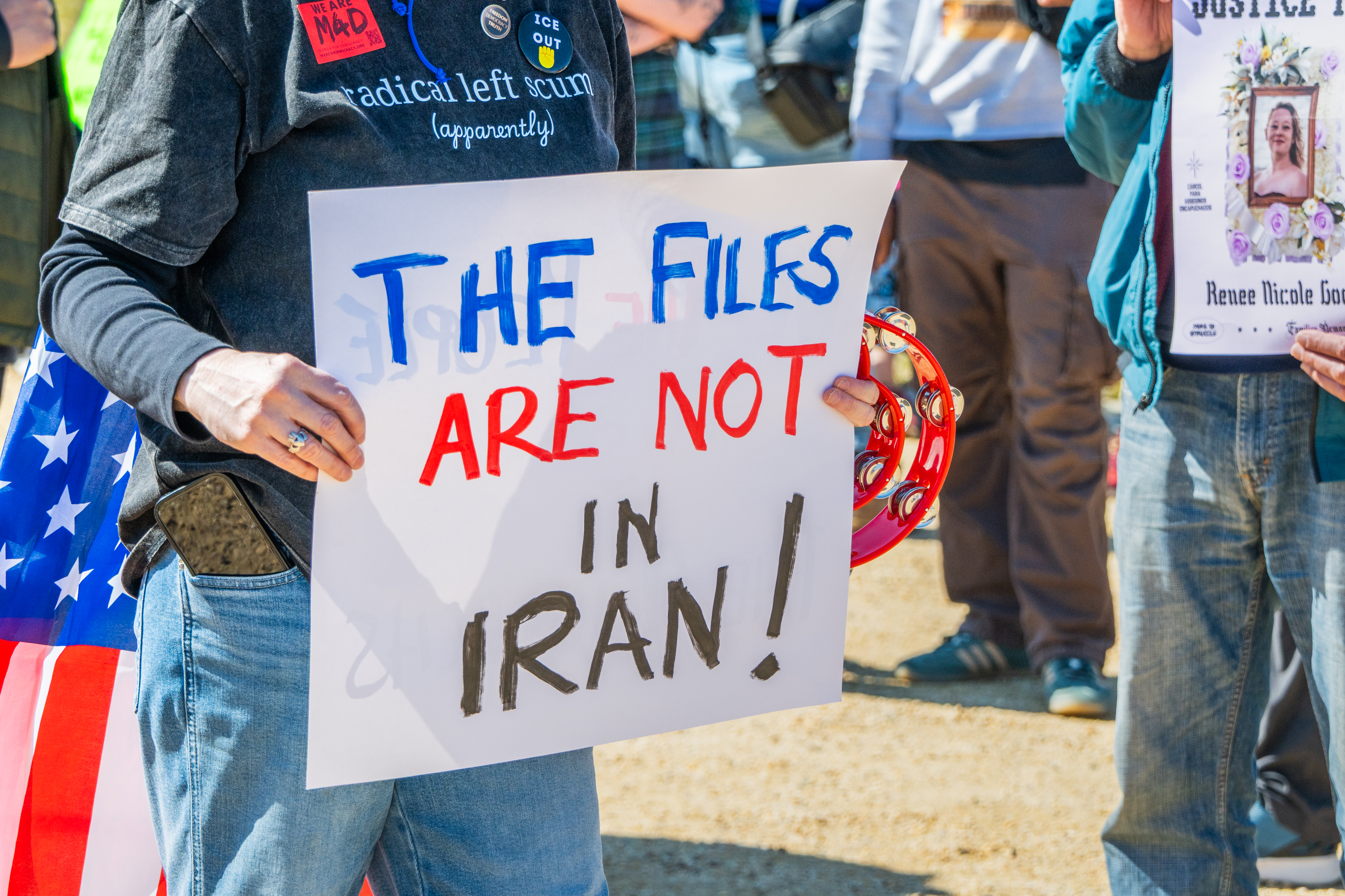
Protester on 28 February 2026, in Washington D.C., referencing the Epstein files

Hundreds of protesters have gathered in front of the White House since 28 February, both in support and in opposition to the war. Protests have persisted despite severe weather.

On 4 March, former Marine Brian McGinnis interrupted a Senate Armed Services Committee hearing on Iran in the Hart Senate Office Building with shouts of “America does not want to send its sons and daughters to war for Israel!” US senator Tim Sheehy (R-MT) attempted to assist Capitol police in forcibly removing him, breaking his arm in the process.

On 18 March, a protest from Win Without War included the display of children backpacks on Capitol Hill in protest of an airstrike on an Minab elementary school that killed 160 children. Additionally, several Democrats in Congress attended the protest.

On 7 April, a protest was held outside the White House despite the ceasefire announcement to call for Trump's removal from office, accusing him of war crimes.

On 21 April, over 62 veterans and their families were arrested in the Cannon House Office Building after a protest organized by several veterans' group occupied the building.

On 21 July, protesters interrupted a hearing in the United States Senate by U.S Defense Secretary Pete Hegseth over the wars in Iran and Palestine, with the protesters removed by police.

==== Arizona ====
On 2 March in Phoenix, protesters gathered at the Arizona State Capitol, both in support and in opposition to the war.

==== California ====
Since 28 February in Los Angeles, protesters gathered outside Los Angeles City Hall, joined by various speakers including Jane Fonda on 28 February and Party for Socialism and Liberation on 3 March.

Since 28 February in San Francisco, hundreds of protesters have gathered outside the Federal Building. Over 1,000 people marched down Market Street on 28 February. On 7 April, activists in San Francisco, California organize an emergency anti-war rally at the Federal Building to protest against Trump’s threats and rhetoric of military action against Iranian infrastructure and nuclear power plants.

On 7 April, protests were held in other cities in California such as San Diego and Chico even despite Trump later backing off on his threats.

On the evening of 18 April 2026, during the Coachella festival, The Strokes denounced the strikes and accused the Central Intelligence Agency of using violence to promote regime change while performing "Oblivius".

==== Hawaii ====
Since 28 February, protests were held in Honolulu, Hawaii, including the ʻIolani Palace. One protest called “Stop the U.S. War on Iran”, organized by Refuse Fascism Hawaii, was held on Ala Moana Boulevard. On 2 March, a protest was held at the Hawaii State Capitol, with Iranian Americans opposing the war.

==== Illinois ====
Since 28 February in Chicago, protesters gathered in various locations, Large crowds gathered in Federal Plaza along with several anti-war organizations, before marching downtown on 28 February. An "emergency protest" was held on 2 March. Students at the Evanston Township High School staged a walk-out protest against the war and other actions by the Trump administration on 27 March.

==== Iowa ====
A protest was held on 2 March in the East Village area of Des Moines, Iowa against the US-Israel strikes. Additionally, over 100 protesters gathered at the Iowa Capitol.

==== Michigan ====
A protest was held on 28 February on Jefferson Avenue to protest the US strikes. Additionally, protests were also held at Hart Plaza and Wayne State University. On Easter, a protest is held in downtown Detroit to protest the US-Israeli airstrikes. On 25 September 2026, a protest was held in Lansing at a Speedway gas station against high gas prices.

==== Minnesota ====
In Minneapolis, protesters, including Iranian protesters in support of the strikes, gathered downtown. Members of the Minnesota DFL Party condemned the war, calling it "unlawful" and "illegal".

==== New York ====
Since 28 February in New York City, various protests across the city have taken place. Around 1,000 people gathered in Times Square on 28 February in a "Freedom for Iran" rally. In Manhattan, protesters gathered at Columbus Circle in a "Stop the War" rally. The New York City Police Department (NYPD) has increased security at "sensitive locations" across the city.

On 7 March, an explosive device was thrown outside of Zohran Mamdani's official residence at Gracie Mansion during a counter protest. The FBI is investigating the incident as an act of terrorism.

On 14 April 90 were arrested during a protest against arms sales to Israel in Manhattan organized by the Jewish Voice for Peace, the group says that those who were arrested included whistleblower Chelsea Manning, actress Hari Nef and New York City Council Member Alexa Avilés.

==== Nevada ====
Veterans hold a Veterans Speak Out gathering at the Nevada State Capitol in Carson City, Nevada, U.S., to honor the U.S. troops who were killed during the Iran war. Additionally, veterans also criticize the war as unconstitutional, citing Article 1 Section 8 of the U.S. Constitution.

==== Pennsylvania ====
In Philadelphia, protesters gathered outside Philadelphia City Hall, joined by the Philly Iranians group.

==== Texas ====
On 28 February – 1 March, protesters gathered in Houston both in support and in opposition to the war.

==== Washington ====
On 28 February, hundreds of protesters gathered in downtown Seattle, with support from Washington senators Maria Cantwell and Patty Murray. Iranian protesters in support of the strikes held a vigil for protesters killed in Iran at Seattle City Hall on 2 March. On 7 April, a protest is held at the Seattle City Hall in Seattle.

== Other countries ==
=== Australia ===
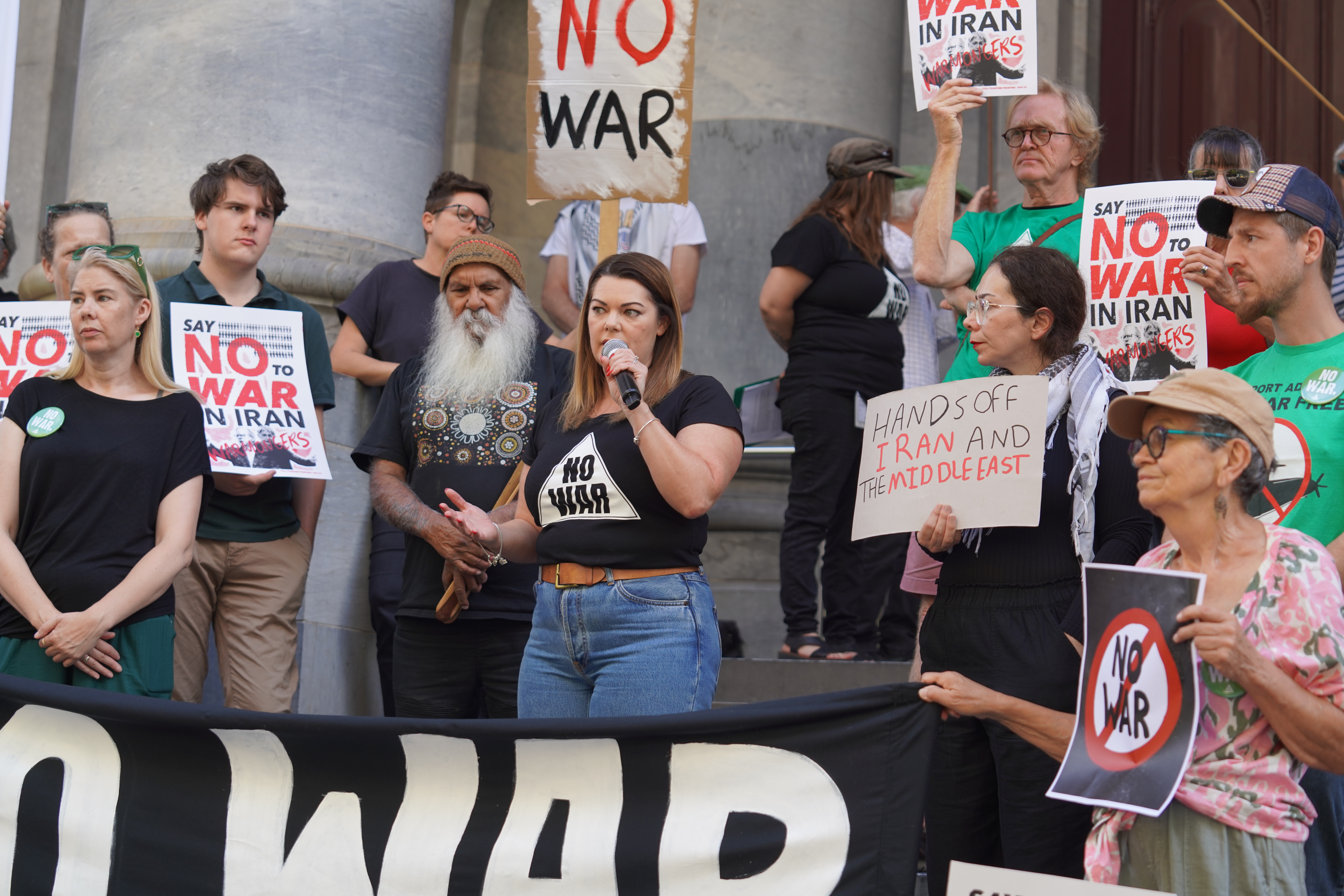
Anti-war rally at Parliament House, Adelaide, Australia

The group Democratic Solidarity of Iranians organized a protest outside the United States consulate in Sydney on 6 March, where they were met by counter-protesters. The Sydney Anti-AUKUS Coalition organized an anti-war protest at Sydney Town Hall on 14 March. On 15 March, the South Australian Greens organized a rally attended by 300 people outside of the South Australia Parliament House in Adelaide, demanding an end to Australian involvement with the US-Israeli war effort. On the morning 8 April, approximately 10 activists blocked the entrance to the Adelaide headquarters of the military contractor BAE Systems Australia for around three hours, with one chaining himself to the entrance gates.

=== Bangladesh ===
Pro-Iran demonstration was organized by the Bangladesh Jamaat-e-Islami at Baitul Mukarram National Mosque on 1 March condemning Khamenei's death and demanding the intervention of the Organization of Islamic Cooperation. Anti-war demonstrations were staged by Ganosanhati Andolan in Dhaka on 6 March, demanding Bangladeshi government's initiative to end the "sacrilegious war" against Iran. Anti-war signs were also featured in Bengali New Year parade on 14 April.

=== France ===
On 15 March, more than 85 co-ordinated rallies against military operations in Iran, Lebanon and Palestine were held across France. The group the collective Femmes, Vie, Liberté Nantes called for a rally in Place Royale, Nantes on 28 March, denouncing the war as "illegal" while calling for democracy and secularism within Iran.

=== Germany ===
Reza Pahlavi, the former crown prince of Iran, was splashed with red liquid after leaving a press conference in Berlin, Germany in which he criticized the ceasefire between Iran and the U.S.

=== Greece ===
On 1 March, over 1,300 demonstrators, mainly affiliated with the Communist Party of Greece, protested in Athens, with people holding ‌banners and placards reading, "Hands off Iran" and "Close Souda base".

=== India ===
Shia Muslims protested the killing of Ali Khamenei across India on 1 March 2026. Candle marches, demonstrations and protests were held by the Shias and supporting political parties in the states and union territories of Bihar, Delhi, Chhattisgarh, Jammu and Kashmir, Jharkhand, Karnataka, Ladakh, Madhya Pradesh, Punjab, Tamil Nadu, Telangana and Uttar Pradesh. In many places, demonstrators carried portraits of Khamenei, and raised anti-US and anti-Israel slogans while mourning his death through various rituals.

=== Indonesia ===
Several civil groups organized protests in front of the U.S. Embassy in Jakarta in support of Iran, and called for Indonesia to leave the U.S.-formed Board of Peace.

=== Iraq ===
In Baghdad, pro-Iranian protesters attempted to approach the U.S. Embassy on 1 March, leading to clashes with security forces using tear gas.

=== Japan ===
In March, the winner of the 2024 Nobel Peace Prize Nihon Hidankyo issued a statement calling a cease-fire and accusing the United States and Israel of carrying out "preemptive strikes on Iran that disregard international law." On 7 March, anti-war protest was held in Nagasaki which was also joined by Koichi Kawano, a survivor of the atomic bombing of Nagasaki. On 25 March, 24,000 demonstrators gathered outside the National Diet in Chiyoda-ku, Tokyo to protest against revisions to Japan's Constitution and to oppose United States and Israel on attacking Iran. On 28 March, an anti-war protest was organized by the civil group Paresuchina ni Heiwa o! Kinkyū Kōdō (lit. 'Peace for Palestine! Emergency Action'), which was held in front of Shinjuku Station and attended by 700 people. On 8 April, 50,000 protestors across over 150 locations, including around 30,000 outside the National Diet Building in Chiyoda-ku, Tokyo, protested against the war and proposals by prime minister Sanae Takaichi plan to revise Article 9 of the constitution.

=== Mexico ===
On 8 March, protests were reported outside of the US consulate in Mexico City. Protesters were seen with a portrait of Ali Khamenei, waving Iranian and Lebanese flags and beating a piñata depicting Israeli prime minister Benjamin Netanyahu.

=== Morocco ===
On 28 February there are reports of anti-war protests in Rabat.

=== Nigeria ===
Shia Muslim demonstrators affiliated with the Islamic Movement gathered in Kano to mourn the death of Khamenei. Demonstrators were seen waving Iranian and Palestinian flags while dragging US and Israeli flags on the ground.

=== New Zealand ===
The Socialist Aotearoa group organised a public meeting at the Mount Eden Memorial Hall in Auckland on 11 March to express opposition to the war in Iran. Notable speakers at the event included Socialist Aotearoa leader Joe Carolan, New Zealand Labour Party Member of Parliament Phil Twyford, Green Party co-leader Marama Davidson and New Zealand Council of Trade Unions president Sandra Grey and several Iranian New Zealander speakers. The meeting was picketed by Iranian New Zealander counter-protesters supporting the US and Israeli strikes as a means of regime change. Police arrested a counter-protester who was involved in a scuffle with a pro-Palestine protester.

On 4 April, anti-war protesters gathered in Auckland's Te Komititanga square in opposition to the New Zealand government's refusal to condemn US and Israeli actions against Iran. The event was organised by the Stop Wars Aotearoa coalition and featured speakers from the Iranian New Zealand community and the Palestine Solidarity Network Aotearoa (PSNA).

On 11 April, several "Stop Wars Aotearoa" rallies were held in several New Zealand cities including Auckland and Christchurch to protest against US and Israeli military actions in Iran and Lebanon. These protests were organised by the Stop Wars Aotearoa coalition which included the Socialist Aotearoa, "Americans Abroad Against the War," Worker First Union, PSNA, and members of the Iranian and Afghan communities in New Zealand. In Auckland, protesters marched to the United States Consulate-General on Customs Street where they staged a "die in" to mark the 2026 Minab school attack. A smaller group of pro-Pahlavi and pro-Israel counter-protesters also gathered outside the US Consulate. Several speakers also addressed the Auckland rally including the PSNA's co-chair Maher Nazzal, Labour MP Phil Twyford, Green MP Ricardo Menéndez March, Alliance Party candidate Victor Billot, and NZCTU president Sandra Grey.

=== Pakistan ===
Protests erupted across Pakistan on 1 March 2026, primarily among Shia Muslim communities, in response to the killing of Supreme Leader Ali Khamenei in the joint US-Israeli strikes. The demonstrations condemned the attacks and expressed solidarity with Iran, with chants of "Death to America" and "Death to Israel." Protestors also accused the Pakistani government of siding with the US during the conflict. The nationwide protests lead to the deaths of 26–35 protestors and 120 injured, including 10–16 at the US Consulate in Karachi, at least 3 at the US embassy in Islamabad and at least 13 in Gilgit-Baltistan.

In Karachi, hundreds of protesters attempted to storm the US Consulate, breaching the outer wall and clashing with police and paramilitary forces who used tear gas and live fire. As protests escalated, the Marine Security Guards opened fire, killing at least 10 and upto 16 protestors and injuring over 60 people. Protesters smashed windows, torched a nearby police post, and set vehicles ablaze before being dispersed.

In Lahore, hundreds gathered outside the US Consulate, but were dispersed by the police after the consulate was attacked. Protests also occurred in Islamabad, authorities blocked roads to the Red Zone and increased security around the US Embassy amid calls for demonstrations with 3 protesters being killed near the embassy. Additional rallies were reported in Multan, where Shia participants mourned Khamenei and condemned the strikes, and plans were noted for further actions in Peshawar and other areas. Protests and demonstrations were also reported in Faisalabad.

In Gilgit-Baltistan, pro-Iranian protests erupted in Gilgit, on 1 March 2026 following the killing of Khamenei, thousands of Shia demonstrators targeted and set fire to the offices of the United Nations Military Observer Group amid widespread unrest in the region. At least 13 protesters and 1 security officer were killed and 60 were injured in Gilgit, Skardu, and Shigar districts, and other buildings, including a school, were damaged. A three-day curfew was imposed in Gilgit-Baltistan and Pakistan Army troops were deployed in the region.

=== Philippines ===
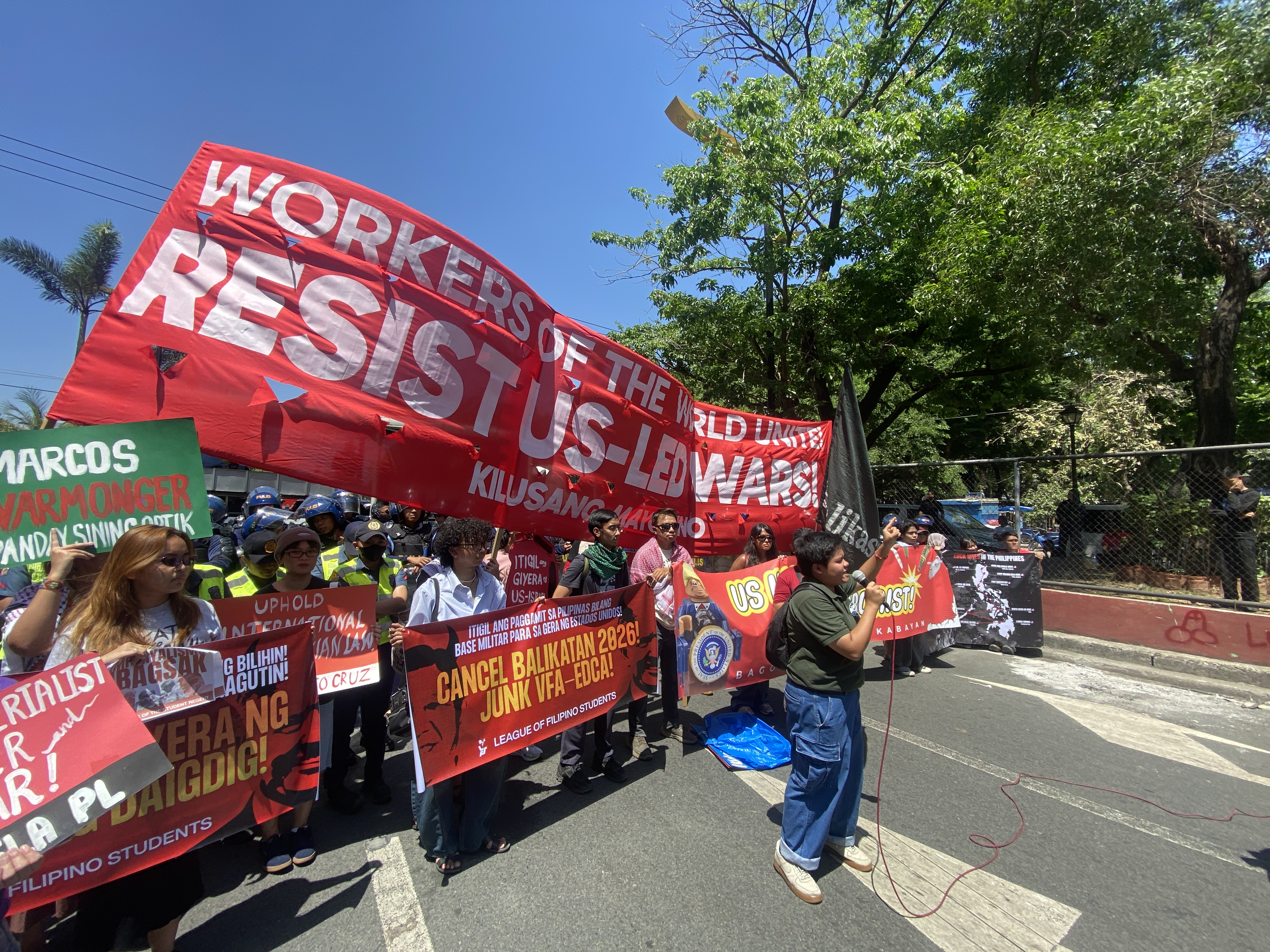
Anti-war protest in Manila on 9 April (Day of Valor)

On 6 March, several protest organized by several groups such as Bahaghari, Gabriela, Anakbayan, and the Moro-Christian People’s Alliance was held outside the US embassy in Manila denouncing the war. On 24 April, students at the University of the Philippines Baguio in Baguio, Cordillera Administrative Region, Philippines staged a walkout to protest against the US-Israeli strikes against Iran, and hold a candle vigil for slain UP Diliman student council member Alyssa Alano, who was killed in a 19 April clash with the New People's Army in Toboso, Negros Occidental.

On 1 May, a Labour Day rally organized by labour group Kilusang Mayo Uno, was held in Manila, Philippines. During the rally, protesters attempted to storm the U.S. Embassy to demand an end to the Iran war and clashed with police, injuring seven officers.

=== South Korea ===
On the anniversary of the March First Movement, civic groups such as the People's Solidarity for Participatory Democracy held an anti-war demonstration at the US embassy in Seoul. On 17 March, around 60 Buddhist monks from the Jogye Order marched around three kilometres to the embassy to protest the war, with some performing full body prostration.

=== Spain ===
On 12 March, the Assembly Against Armament and Militarization organized a human chain against the war in the Middle East in Madrid, which was attended by Podemos leader Ione Belarra. A petition signed by civil society groups and public figures called for nationwide demonstrations on 14 March.

=== Turkey ===
Demonstrations against the strikes were held in İzmir on 28 February. On 1 March, members of the Revolutionary Party protested against the war outside the US embassy in Ankara. Members of the Labour and Democracy Platform in Adana protested against the attacks and called for a closure of US and NATO airbases in Turkey, including the Incirlik base hosted in the city.

=== United Kingdom ===
In London, anti-strikes protests took place on 28 February. London's Metropolitan Police imposed conditions on both the Iranian diaspora rallies and the pro-Palestinian "Hands off Iran" protests in order to prevent potential clashes between the opposing groups. On 7 March, more than 50,000 people joined protests in London against the strikes, organized by groups that includes the Campaign for Nuclear Disarmament, Stop The War, the Palestine Solidarity Campaign, the Muslim Association of Britain, the Palestinian Forum in Britain, and Friends of Al-Aqsa. That same day, four people were arrested in total on 7 March for suspicion of inciting racial hatred, possession of an offensive weapon, racially aggravated public order offences, and violent disorder in relation to an incident the day prior near the Islamic Centre of England. Subsequently, an Iran-linked pro-Palestinian Quds Day march planned for 15 March in London was banned by the Home Secretary to "prevent serious public disorder" by request of the Metropolitan Police.

== See also ==
- 2026 Iranian diaspora protests
- Reactions to the assassination of Ali Khamenei
