= List of medical schools in Iran =

This list of medical schools in Iran includes major academic institutions in Iran that award Doctor of Medicine (MD) degrees.

== Current medical schools ==
Province	City	School	Est.	Reference
Tehran	Tehran	Tehran University of Medical Sciences School of Medicine	1851	
Tehran	Tehran	Shahid Beheshti University of Medical Sciences School of Medicine	1961	
Isfahan	Isfahan	Isfahan University of Medical Sciences School of Medicine	1946	
Fars	Shiraz	Shiraz University of Medical Sciences School of Medicine	1946	
Eastern Azerbaijan	Tabriz	Tabriz University of Medical Sciences School of Medicine	1947	
Khorasan Razavi	Mashhad	Mashhad University of Medical Sciences	1949	
Razavi Khorasan	Neyshabur	Neyshabur University of Medical Sciences	2009	
Tehran	Tehran	Iran University of Medical Sciences School of Medicine	1974	
Tehran	Tehran	Shahed University of Medical Sciences School of Medicine	1990	
Tehran	Tehran	Baqiyatallah University of Medical Sciences School of Medicine	1994	
Tehran	Tehran	AJA University of Medical Sciences School of Medicine	1993	
Hamadan	Hamadan	Hamadan University of Medical Sciences School of Medicine	1975	
Khuzestan	Ahvaz	Ahvaz Jundishapur University of Medical Sciences School of Medicine	1955	
Tehran	Tehran	Islamic Azad University Medical Branch of Tehran	1985	
Markazi	Arak	Arak University of Medical Sciences School of Medicine	1987	
Western Azerbaijan	Urmia	Urmia University of Medical Sciences School of Medicine	1980	
Fars	Jahrom	Jahrom University of Medical Sciences School of Medicine	1978	
Qom	Qom	Qom University of Medical Sciences School of Medicine	1997	
Alborz	Karaj	Alborz University of Medical Sciences School of Medicine	2010	
Mazandaran	Babol	Babol University of Medical Sciences School of Medicine International Branch	1962	
Sistan and Balouchistan	Zahedan	Zahedan University of Medical Sciences School of Medicine	1986	
