= Bojnord =

City in North Khorasan province, Iran

Bojnord بجنورد
- City
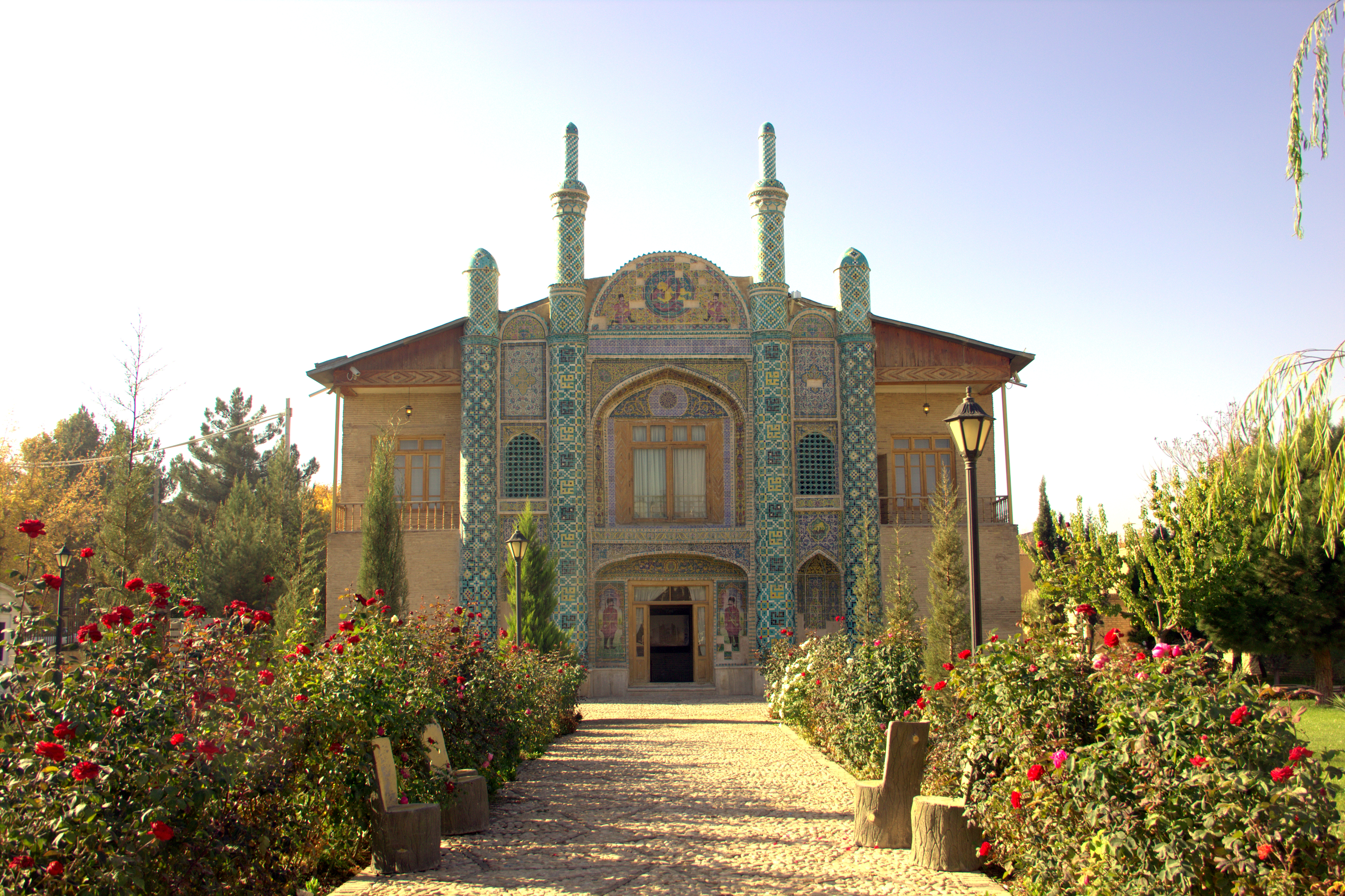
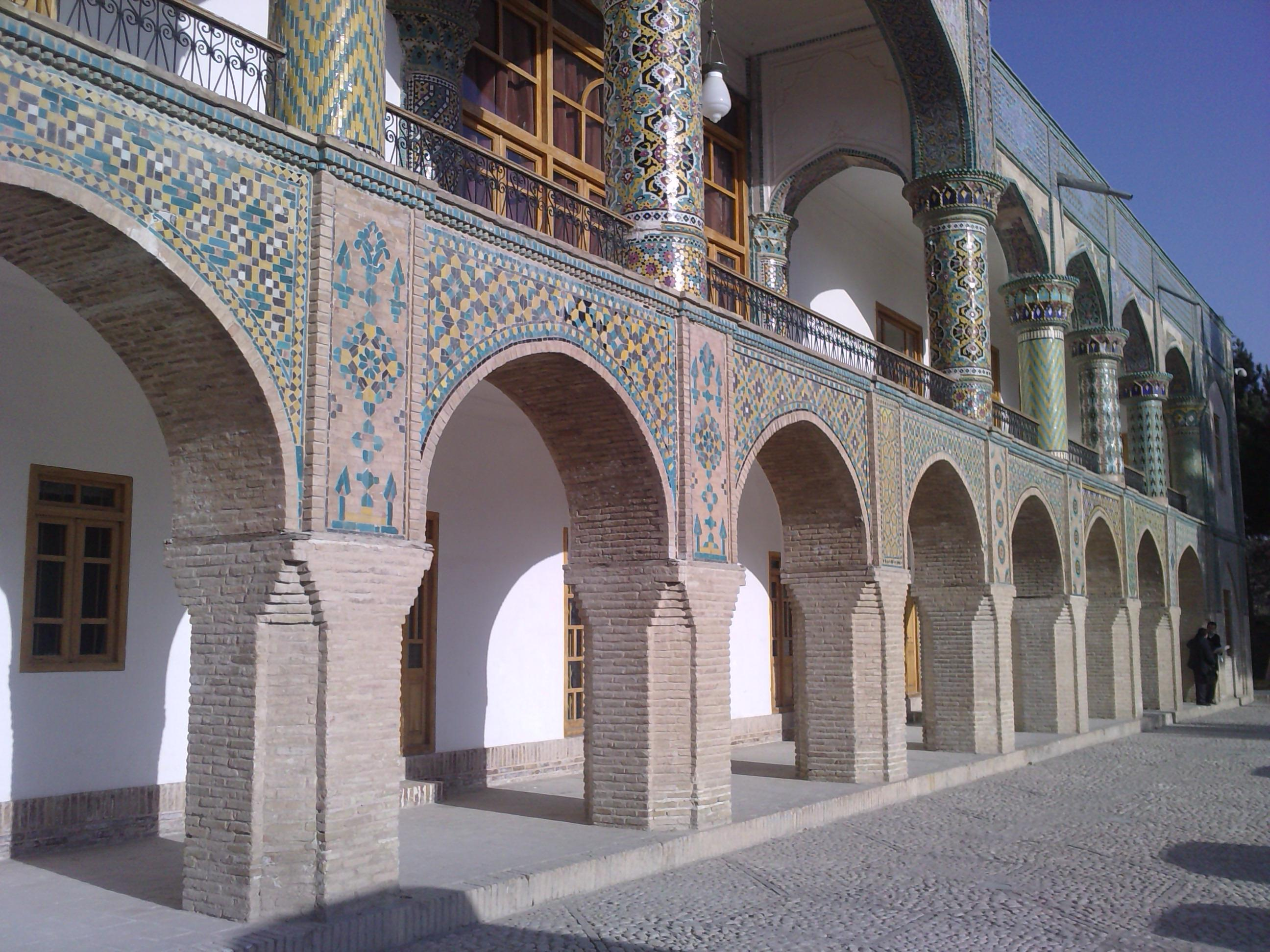
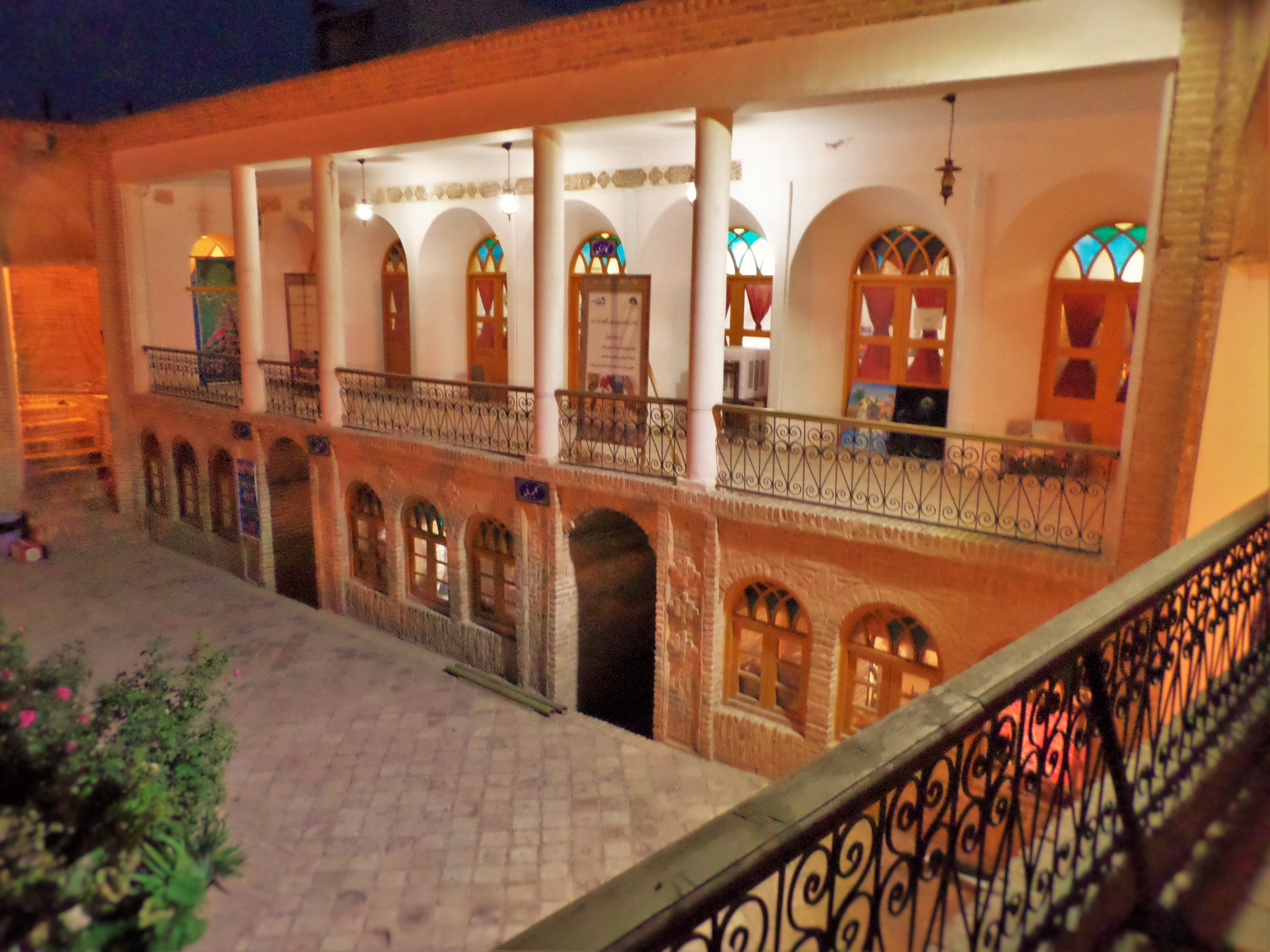
- Mofakham's House of Mirrors, Sardar Mofkham Mansion, Jajarmi Mansion

- Seal

- Location within Iran
- Coordinates: 37°28′20″N 57°19′44″E
- Country: Iran
- Province: North Khorasan
- County: Bojnord
- District: Central

Government
  - Mayor: Mohammad Ali Keshmiri

Area
  - City: 36 km^{2} (14 sq mi)
- Elevation: 1,070 m (3,510 ft)

Population (2016)
  - Urban: 228,931
  - Metro: 335,931
- Time zone: UTC+03:30 (IRST)
- Area code: (+98) 58
- Climate: BSk
- Website: http://www.bojnord-city.ir/

Bojnord (Note: Also romanized as Bojnoord and Bojnūrd; and known during the Middle Ages as Buzanjird.) or Bojnurd (Persian: بجنورد, pronounced [bod͡ʒˈnuːɹd]) is a city in the Central District of Bojnord County, North Khorasan province, Iran, serving as capital of the province, the county, and the district. It is about 701 km (436 mi) from Tehran. and 242 kilometres (150 mi) from Mashhad, the capital of Razavi Khorasan province.

== History ==
According to local tradition, the whole area was controlled by the Qarai Turks since the Mongol invasion in the 13th century.

Bojnurd is of recent origin and possibly built by the Safavids for the Kurdish Şadiyan tribe who had been settled there to strengthen the Safavid borders against hostile Turkmens. Traditionally, the city was surrounded by a defensive wall and consisted of eleven quarters, bazaars and four mosques.

In 1849, the city saw a revolt which destroyed the city. When traveller G. C. Napier visited the city in 1876, it was noted that the chief of Bojnurd was a Kurd who governed the city without taxation in exchange for military support to the central government in Tehran.

Severe earthquakes in 1896 and 1929 destroyed the city and its surroundings. The city would consequently be rebuilt without historical or recent fortifications in a modern manner. In 1997, a magnitude 6.5 earthquake caused significant damage and many fatalities in the city.

== Demographics ==
=== Population ===
Population history
Year	Pop.	±%
1956	19,253	—
1966	31,248	+62.3%
1976	47,719	+52.7%
1986	93,392	+95.7%
1991	112,426	+20.4%
1996	134,835	+19.9%
2006	172,772	+28.1%
2011	199,791	+15.6%
2016	228,931	+14.6%

At the time of the 2006 National Census, the city's population was 172,772 in 44,217 households. The following census in 2011 counted 199,791 people in 56,761 households. The 2016 census measured the population of the city as 228,931 people in 67,335 households.

== Geography ==
Bojnourd city, the capital of North Khorasan province with an area of 36 square kilometers, is located in northeastern Iran at 57 degrees and 20 minutes longitude and 37 degrees and 28 minutes latitude south of Kopedagh mountain range and east of Aladagh mountain range and north of Alborz mountain range. Bojnourd is 1070 meters above sea level and its distance to Tehran is 821 kilometers.

=== Climate ===
Bojnord has a cold semi-arid climate (BSk) according to the Köppen climate classification.

Climate data for Bojnurd (1991–2020) (Note: Rainy days calculated using parameter codes 46 and 71)
Month	Jan	Feb	Mar	Apr	May	Jun	Jul	Aug	Sep	Oct	Nov	Dec	Year
Record high °C (°F)	19.2 (66.6)	27.2 (81.0)	30.8 (87.4)	34.4 (93.9)	37.4 (99.3)	40.0 (104.0)	41.2 (106.2)	40.6 (105.1)	39.0 (102.2)	33.6 (92.5)	27.8 (82.0)	25.0 (77.0)	41.2 (106.2)
Mean daily maximum °C (°F)	6.9 (44.4)	8.7 (47.7)	13.9 (57.0)	19.9 (67.8)	24.9 (76.8)	30.3 (86.5)	32.8 (91.0)	32.1 (89.8)	28.2 (82.8)	21.8 (71.2)	13.9 (57.0)	8.8 (47.8)	20.2 (68.3)
Daily mean °C (°F)	0.9 (33.6)	2.4 (36.3)	7.0 (44.6)	12.6 (54.7)	17.8 (64.0)	22.9 (73.2)	25.4 (77.7)	24.4 (75.9)	20.2 (68.4)	13.8 (56.8)	7.0 (44.6)	2.7 (36.9)	13.1 (55.6)
Mean daily minimum °C (°F)	−3.7 (25.3)	−2.4 (27.7)	1.7 (35.1)	6.6 (43.9)	11.2 (52.2)	15.5 (59.9)	18.2 (64.8)	16.7 (62.1)	12.8 (55.0)	6.9 (44.4)	1.8 (35.2)	−1.9 (28.6)	7.0 (44.5)
Record low °C (°F)	−19.0 (−2.2)	−21.0 (−5.8)	−13.6 (7.5)	−5.4 (22.3)	−0.2 (31.6)	4.0 (39.2)	10.0 (50.0)	5.4 (41.7)	1.6 (34.9)	−5.0 (23.0)	−14.4 (6.1)	−18.1 (−0.6)	−21.0 (−5.8)
Average precipitation mm (inches)	22.2 (0.87)	31.9 (1.26)	45.3 (1.78)	38.7 (1.52)	30.4 (1.20)	10.2 (0.40)	6.8 (0.27)	4.8 (0.19)	7.7 (0.30)	12.4 (0.49)	25.8 (1.02)	19.2 (0.76)	255.4 (10.06)
Average precipitation days (≥ 1.0 mm)	5.4	6.3	7.4	6.1	4.9	1.9	1.1	0.7	1	2.8	4.5	4.5	46.6
Average rainy days	4	5.5	9.2	9.6	7.9	2.9	2.1	1.1	1.9	4.5	7.4	5.9	62
Average snowy days	7.2	7.5	4.7	0.6	0	0	0	0	0	0	1.2	4.1	25.3
Average relative humidity (%)	72	71	68	64	58	47	45	42	48	57	69	73	59.5
Average dew point °C (°F)	−4.1 (24.6)	−3.0 (26.6)	0.5 (32.9)	4.9 (40.8)	8.1 (46.6)	9.1 (48.4)	11.0 (51.8)	8.8 (47.8)	7.2 (45.0)	4.0 (39.2)	0.8 (33.4)	−2.3 (27.9)	3.8 (38.7)
Mean monthly sunshine hours	152	152	174	211	272	325	342	342	289	248	175	144	2,826
Source: NOAA (Snow and Sleet days 1981–2010)

Climate data for Bojnurd (1977–2010)
Month	Jan	Feb	Mar	Apr	May	Jun	Jul	Aug	Sep	Oct	Nov	Dec	Year
Mean daily maximum °C (°F)	6.2 (43.2)	7.8 (46.0)	13.0 (55.4)	19.8 (67.6)	24.3 (75.7)	29.8 (85.6)	32.5 (90.5)	31.9 (89.4)	28.2 (82.8)	21.4 (70.5)	14.3 (57.7)	8.6 (47.5)	19.8 (67.7)
Daily mean °C (°F)	1.2 (34.2)	2.6 (36.7)	7.2 (45.0)	13.3 (55.9)	17.6 (63.7)	22.5 (72.5)	25.2 (77.4)	24.3 (75.7)	20.3 (68.5)	14.1 (57.4)	8.3 (46.9)	3.6 (38.5)	13.4 (56.0)
Mean daily minimum °C (°F)	−3.7 (25.3)	−2.6 (27.3)	1.4 (34.5)	6.7 (44.1)	10.9 (51.6)	15.2 (59.4)	17.9 (64.2)	16.6 (61.9)	12.5 (54.5)	6.9 (44.4)	2.2 (36.0)	−1.5 (29.3)	6.9 (44.4)
Average precipitation mm (inches)	25.1 (0.99)	32.2 (1.27)	42.9 (1.69)	39.1 (1.54)	33.3 (1.31)	9.0 (0.35)	8.7 (0.34)	5.5 (0.22)	9.3 (0.37)	12.4 (0.49)	26.0 (1.02)	24.3 (0.96)	267.8 (10.55)
Average precipitation days	10.6	11.4	12.4	10.8	9.8	3.8	2.4	1.9	2.8	5.3	8.1	9.9	89.2
Average relative humidity (%)	72	71	68	63	58	48	46	43	48	57	67	72	59
Mean monthly sunshine hours	144.4	148.6	164.7	206.8	267.1	309.0	328.5	331.3	281.1	243.2	178.1	142.3	2,745.1
Source 1: World Meteorological Organisation
Source 2:

== Colleges and universities ==
Universities located in Bojnord include:

- University of Bojnurd
- North Khorasan University of Medical Sciences
- Islamic Azad University of Bojnurd
- Eshragh Institute of Higher Education (Bojnurd, North Khorasan)
- Payam Noor University of Bojnurd
- University of Kosar

== Notable people ==
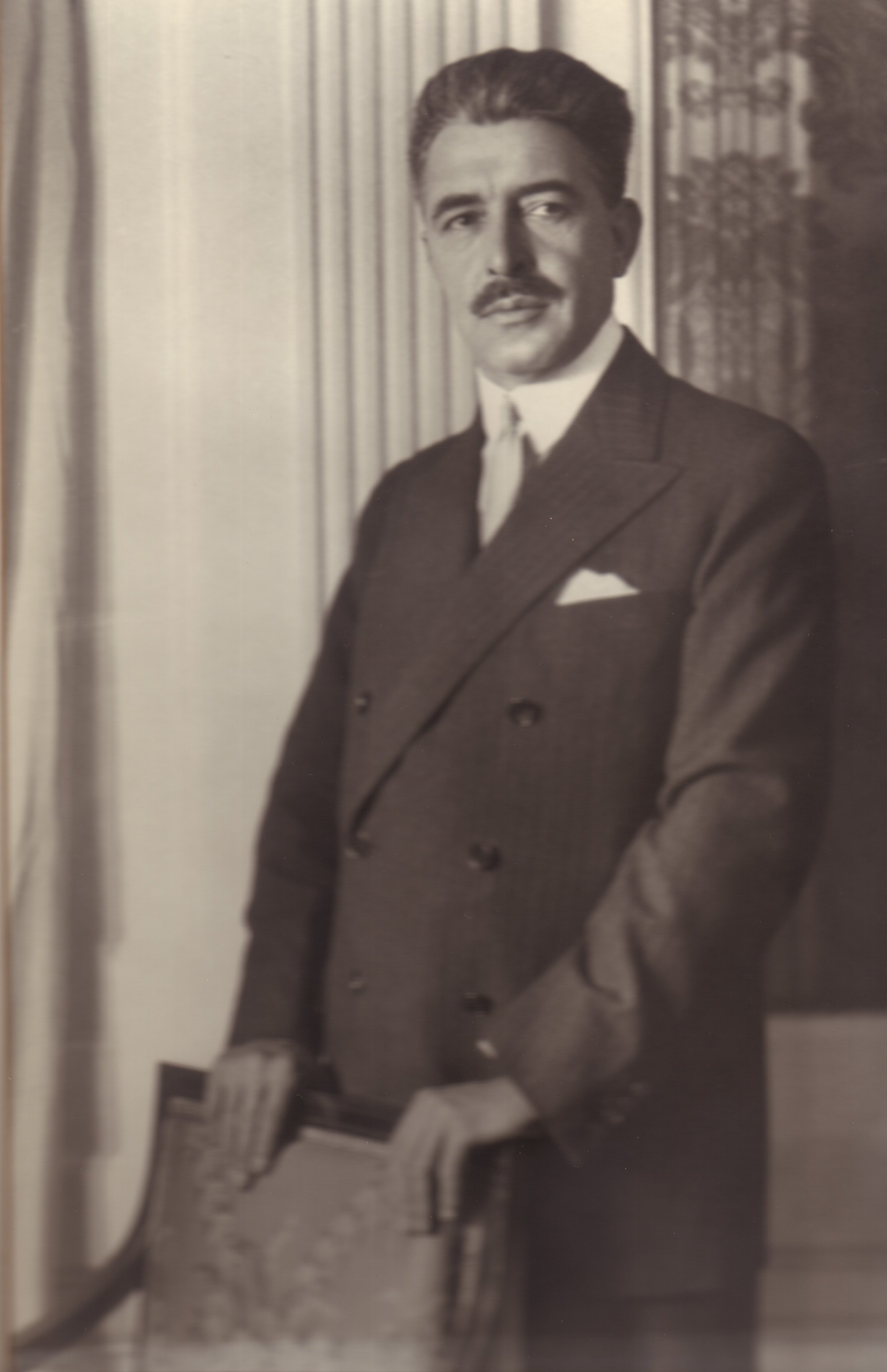
Abdolhossein Teymourtash (Sardar Moazzam Khorasani), a distinguished and influential Iranian politician of the 20th century (Pahlavi dynasty), was born in Bojnord

- Abdolhossein Teymourtash (Sardar Moazzam Khorasani), a distinguished and influential politician of the 20th century (Pahlavi dynasty)
- Ali-Akbar Davar, politician and judge and the founder of the modern judicial system of Iran
- Kazem Mousavi Bojnurdi, historian, theologian, writer and the curator of the National Library of Iran (1997–2005)
- Mohammad Davari, journalist, known for arrest in 2009–10 Iranian election protests
- Mostafa Tabrizi, politician

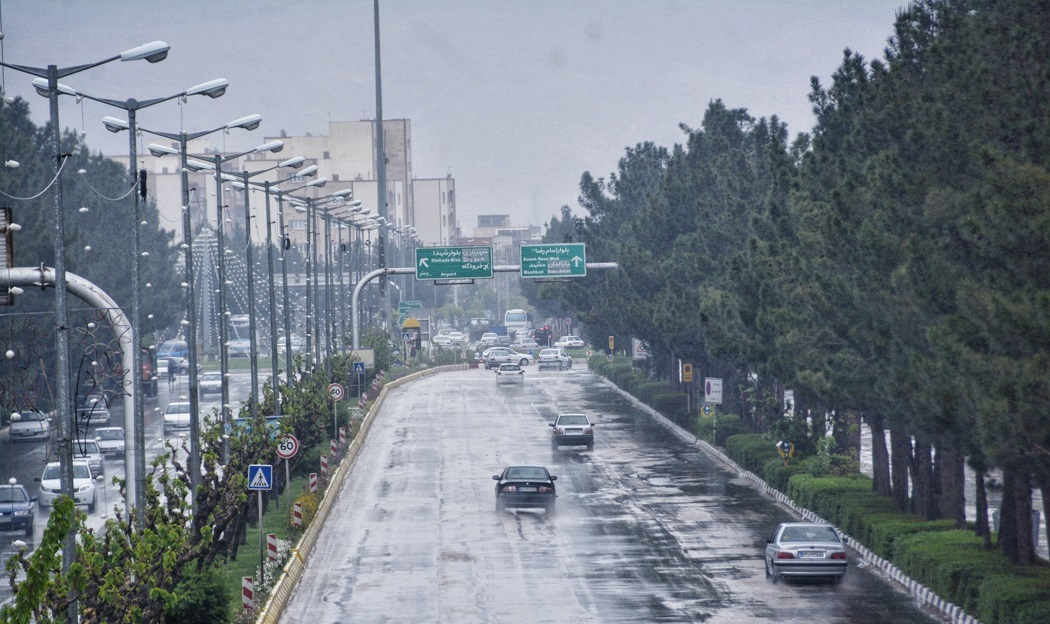
A rainy spring day in Bojnord

== See also ==
Media related to Bojnord at Wikimedia Commons
