= U Nar Auk Monastery =

Buddhist monastery in Myanmar

- ဦးနာအောက်ကျောင်း
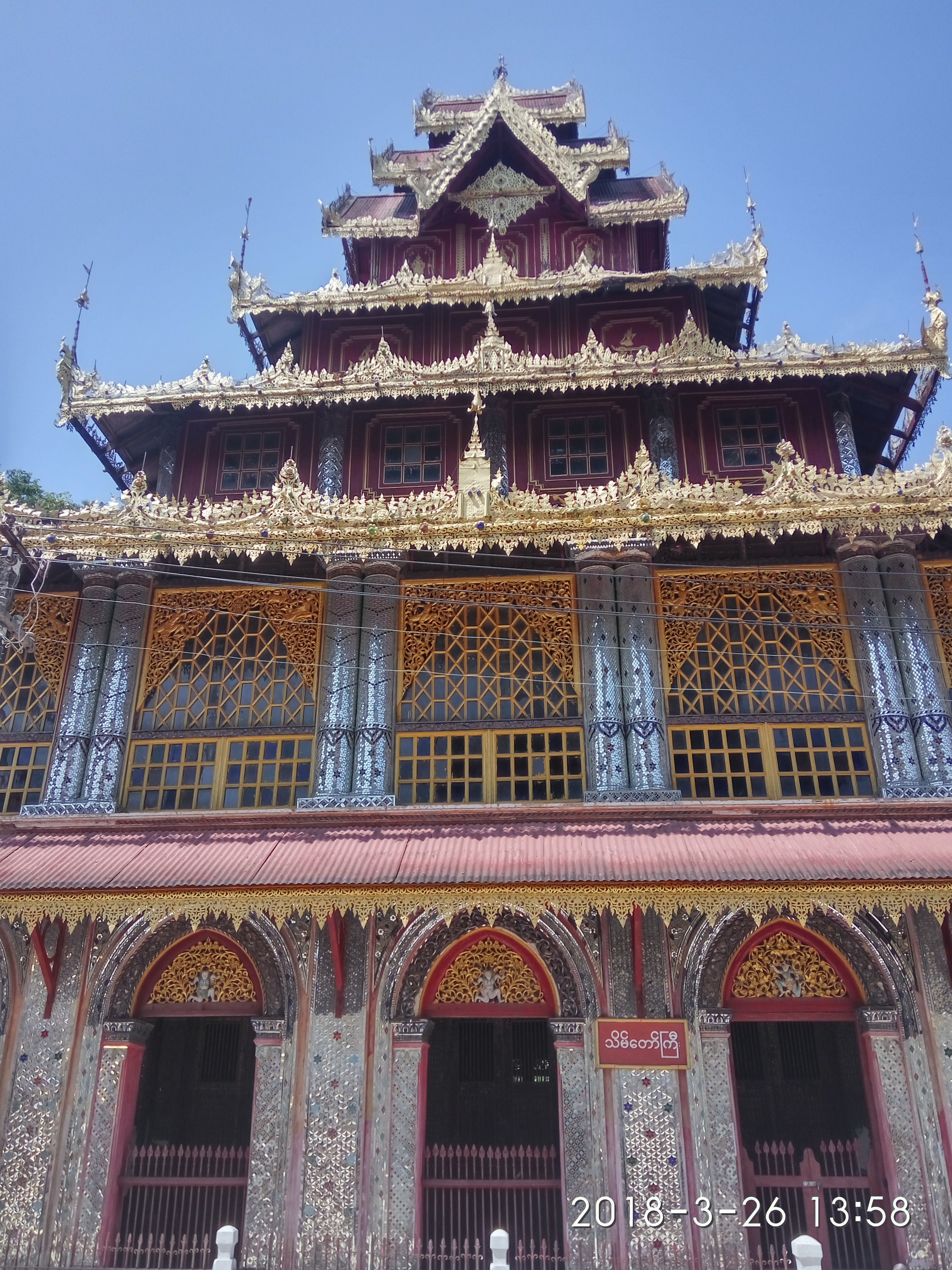

Religion
- Affiliation: Theravada Buddhism

Location
- Country: Kawhnat, Mawlamyine District, Mon State, Myanmar
- Interactive map of U Nar Auk Monastery
- Coordinates: 16.584581°N 97.660565°E

Architecture
- Founder: Nar Auk
- Completed: 1895; 131 years ago

U Nar Auk Monastery (Burmese: ဦးနာအောက် ကျောင်း; Mon: ကျာ်နဲာအံက်ကွာန်ကအ်နှာတ်), also known as the U Nar Auk Shrines, is a historic Buddhist monastery located in the village of Kawhnat, Mon State, Myanmar. The monastic compound, known for its ornate blending of traditional Burmese and foreign architectural craftsmanship, contains an ordination hall built in 1895, as well as three shrines and two pagodas built between 1902 and 1904. The 28 Buddhas shrine (နှစ်ကျိပ်ရှစ်ဆူဝတ်တန်ဆောင်) is known for its arabesque archways, carved teak slab reliefs depicting the histories of Thaton and Bagan, its ceiling, and glass mosaic craftsmanship. Two of the monastery buildings, which incorporate Indo-European and Chinese motifs, were donated by logging tycoons Htaw Ei and Htun Kyaw.

The monastery is named after Nar Auk (my), an ethnic Mon teak-logging tycoon (1832–1913).

== See also ==
- Buddhism in Myanmar
