= Ayeneh-kari =

Iranian mirror-work

Ayeneh-Kari, the art of mirror-work in Persian architecture
- UNESCO Intangible Cultural Heritage
- Country: Iran
- Reference: 02319
- Region: Asia and the Pacific

Inscription history
- Inscription: 2025 (20th session)
- List: Representative

Ayeneh-kari (Persian: آینه‌کاری, lit. 'Mirror-work') is a kind of Iranian interior decoration where artists assemble finely cut mirrors together in geometric, calligraphic or foliage forms (inspired by flowers and other plants). This creates a shining surface covered with complex facets, reflecting light as intricate abstract patterns or glittering reflections. Beside their decorative use, this art form is used as a strong durable cover for interior spaces.

== Etymology ==
The word Ayeneh-kari is a Persian compound word, composed of the words ayeneh and kari. Ayeneh means mirror. Kari means to do or place something onto something else. Together, the word Ayeneh-kari means mirror-work.

== History ==
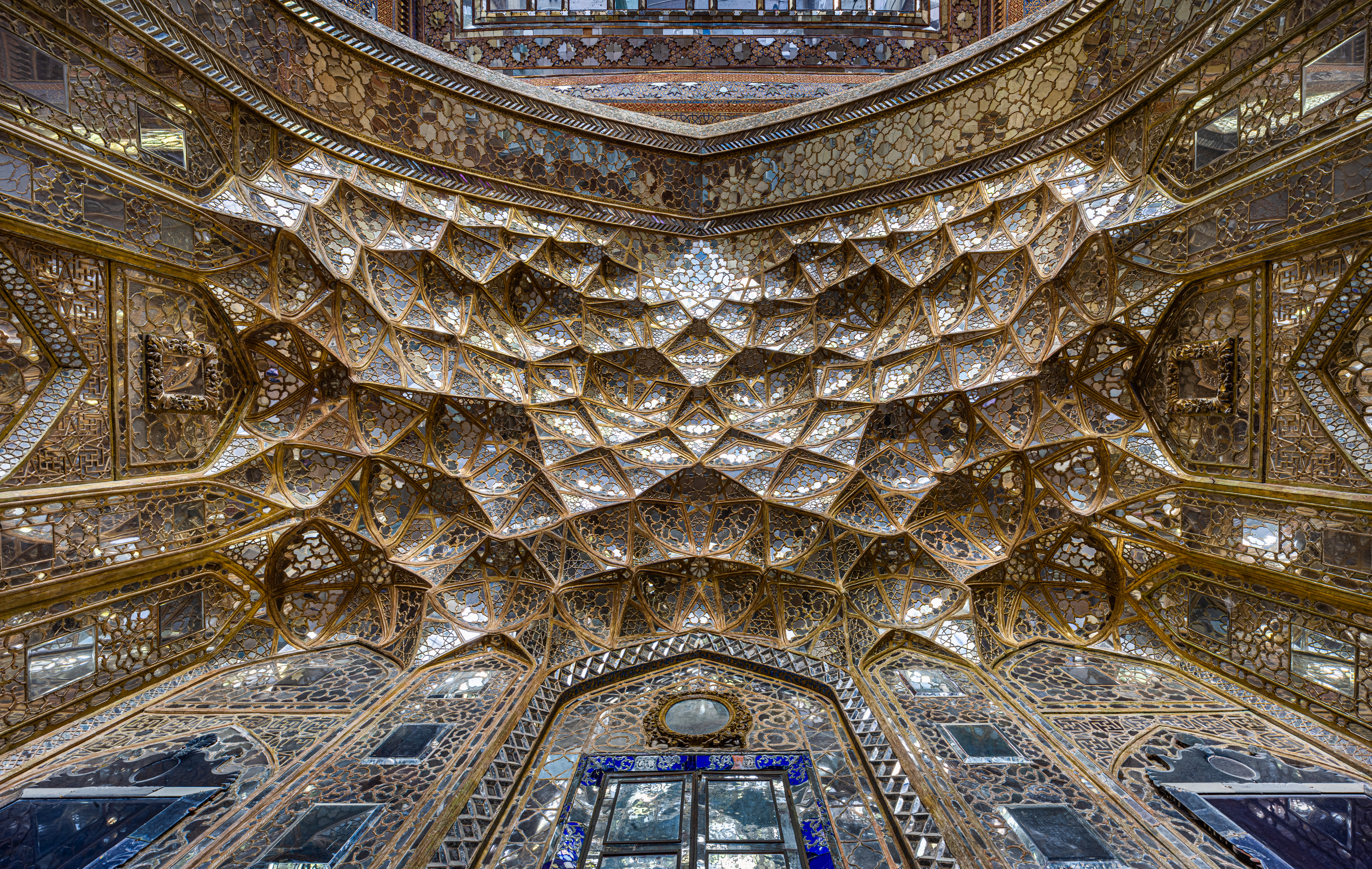
Ayeneh kari on the ceiling of Chehel Sotoun, a Safavid era pavillion in Isfahan

This art form may have evolved from the creative reuse of shattered fragments of imported mirrors. The craft of ayeneh-kari began during the Safavid era, when it became closely associated with the ornamentation of Shia shrines and imamzadehs. In these sacred spaces, walls and vaulted ceilings were decorated with intricate, geometric mosaics of small cut mirrors. While mirror-work was also employed in secular palatial architecture, its application in shrines differed significantly through the use of fractured and shattered glass that intentionally distorted individual reflections. By the 19th century, affluent homes in Isfahan featured a 'mirror room' as a reception space, in which mirror work was combined with carved stucco and the display of artist's prints.

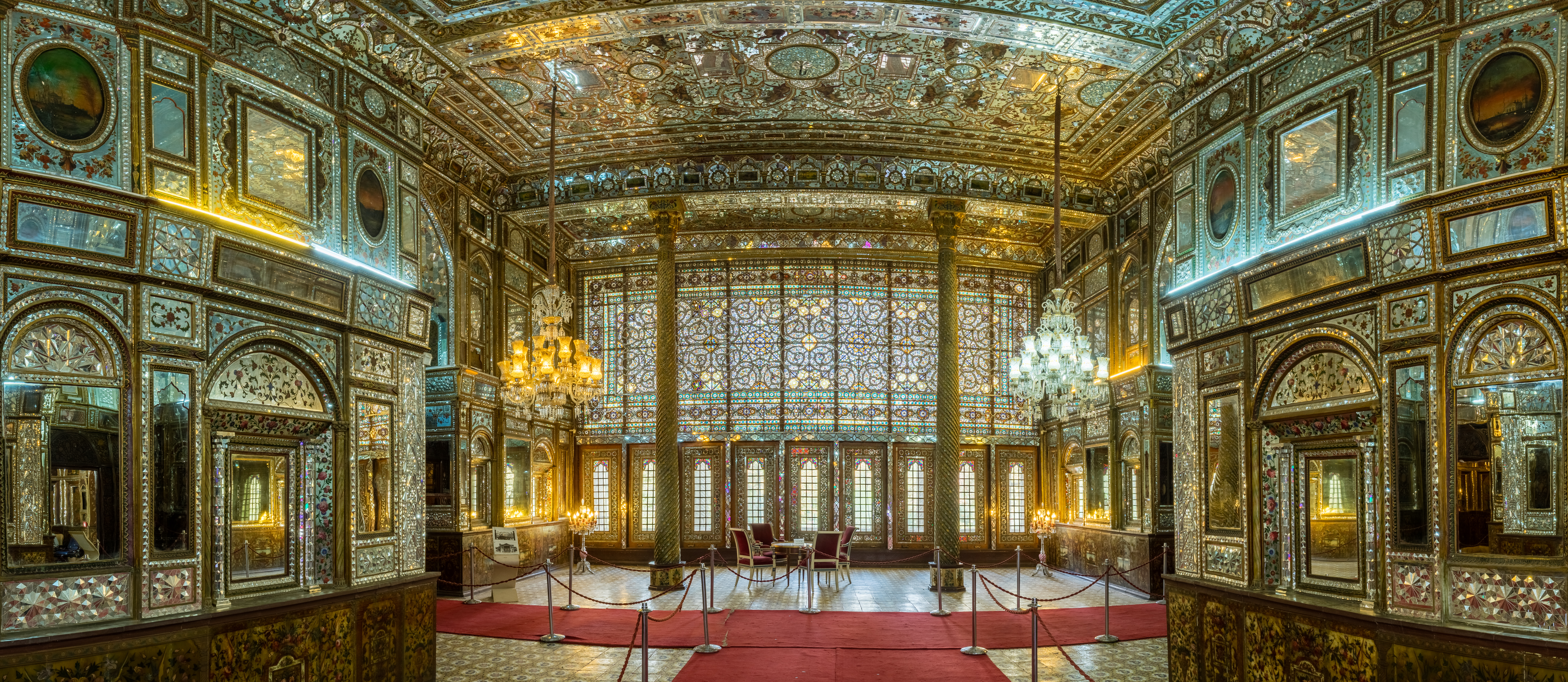
Ayeneh-kari in the main hall of Emarat-e Badgir, a Qajar era mansion in Golestan Palace, Tehran

During the Zand and Qajar eras, this craft was applied over doorways, window-frames, walls, ceilings, and columns in pavilions and private houses, tea-houses and zūrḵānas, as well as royal buildings and shrines. Mofakham's House of Mirrors in Bojnord, North Khorasan is another notable example of ayeneh-kari in the Qajar era. The funerary complex of Shah Cheragh in Shiraz, Iran, features extensive use of Ayeneh-kari. It also appears as an external architectural facade, within semi-domed Iwans that mark the entrance of tālārs, courtyards, gardens and reflecting pools.

Monir Shahroudy Farmanfarmaian was an Iranian artist who, by re-interpreting Ayeneh-kari, brought the art form into the contemporary art scene.

== Gallery ==
Ayeneh-kari of Fatima Masumeh Shrine, Qom

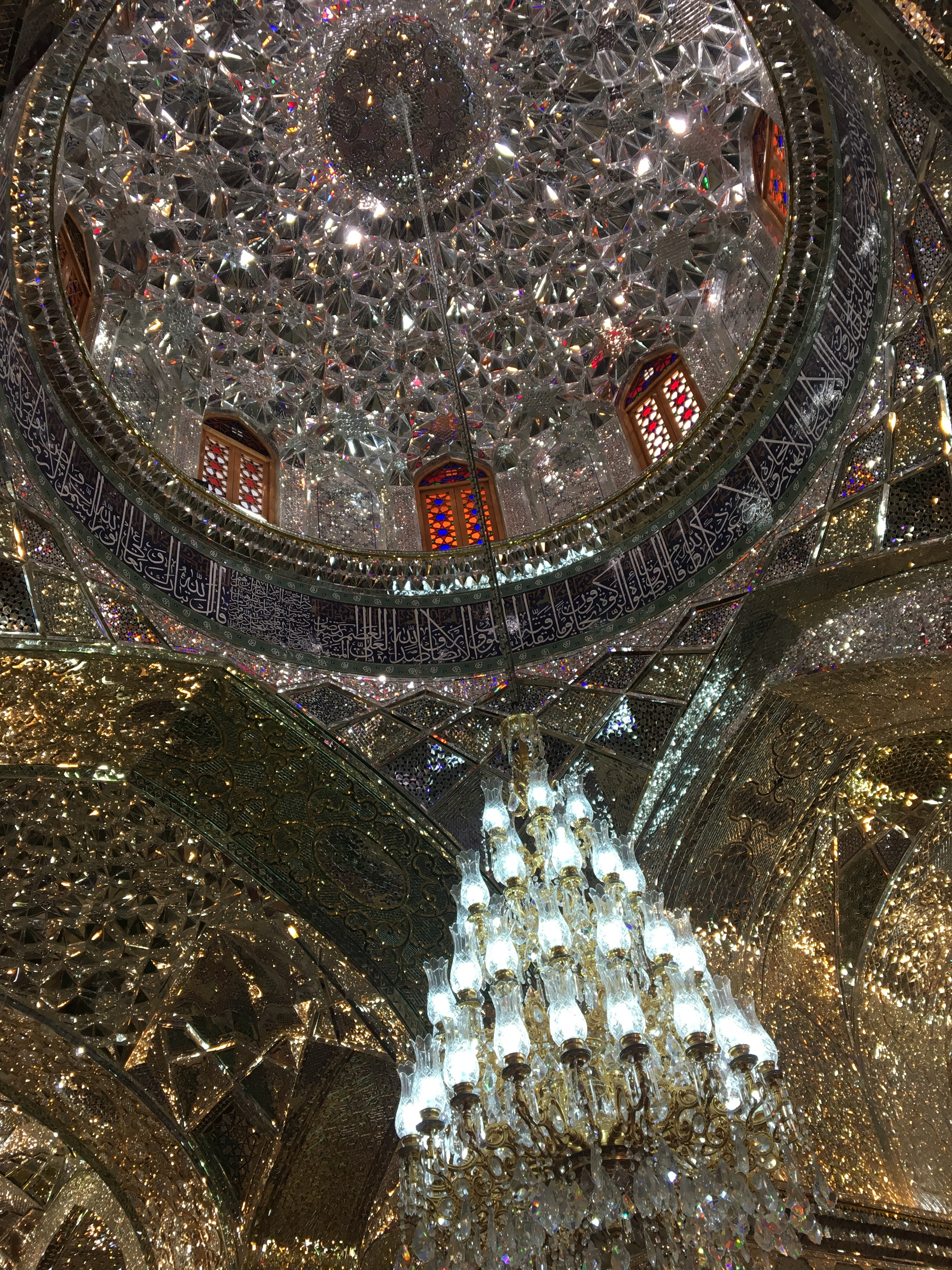
Ayeneh-kari on the ceiling of Shah Cheragh shrine, Shiraz

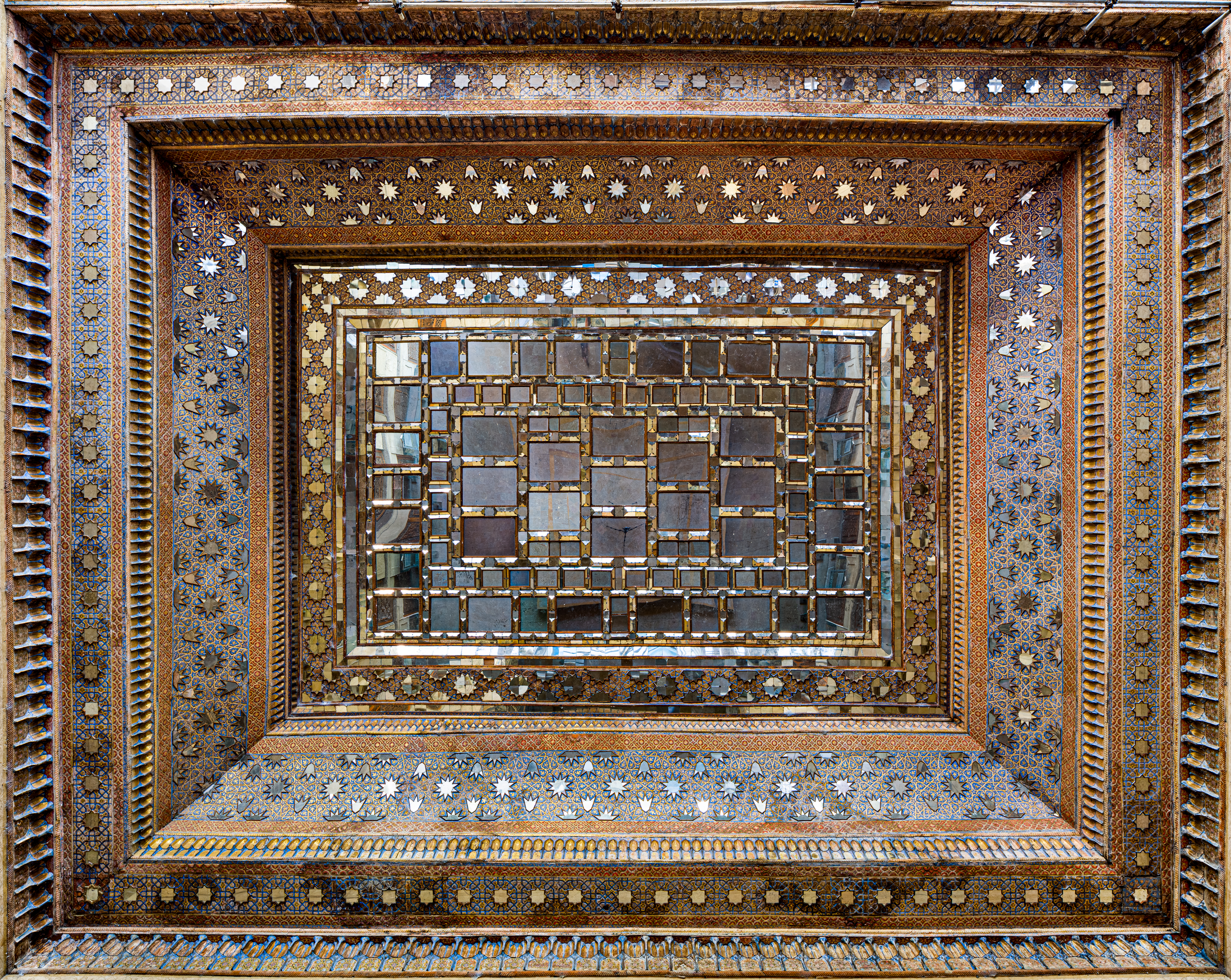
Ceiling of Chehel Sotoun's mirror hall that contains Ayeneh-kari, Isfahan

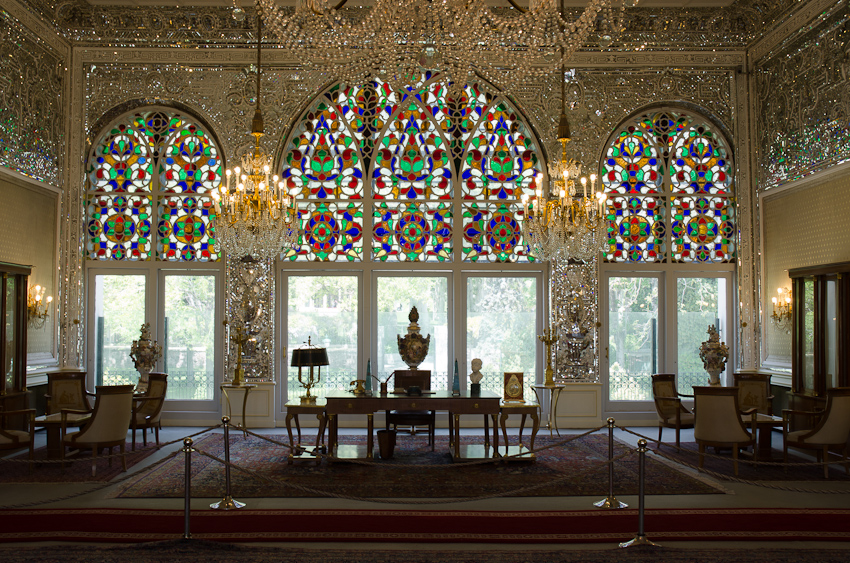
Ayeneh-kari in Sahebgharaniyeh Palace, Niavaran Complex, Tehran

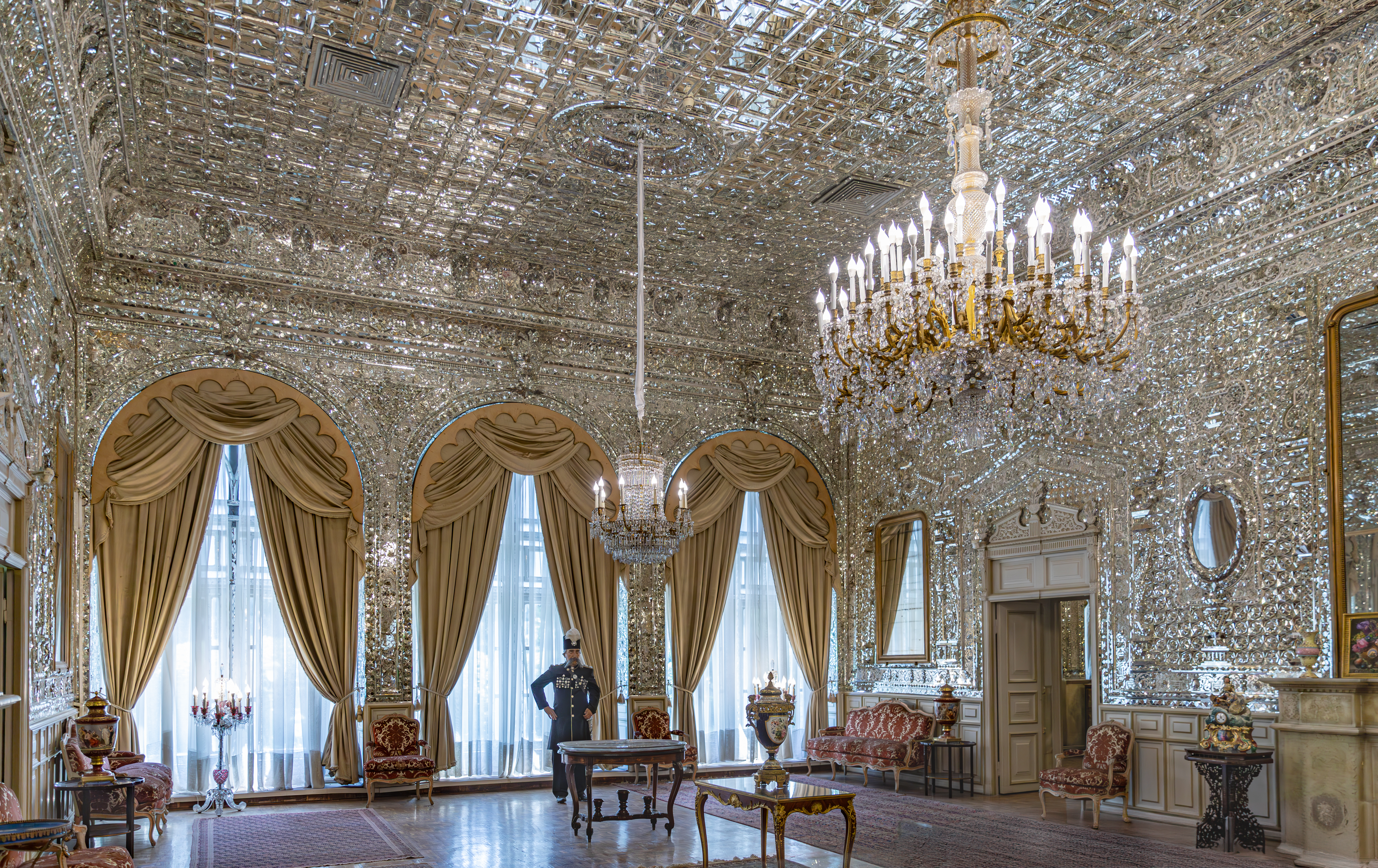
Ayeneh-kari in the Brilliant Hall of Golestan Palace, Tehran

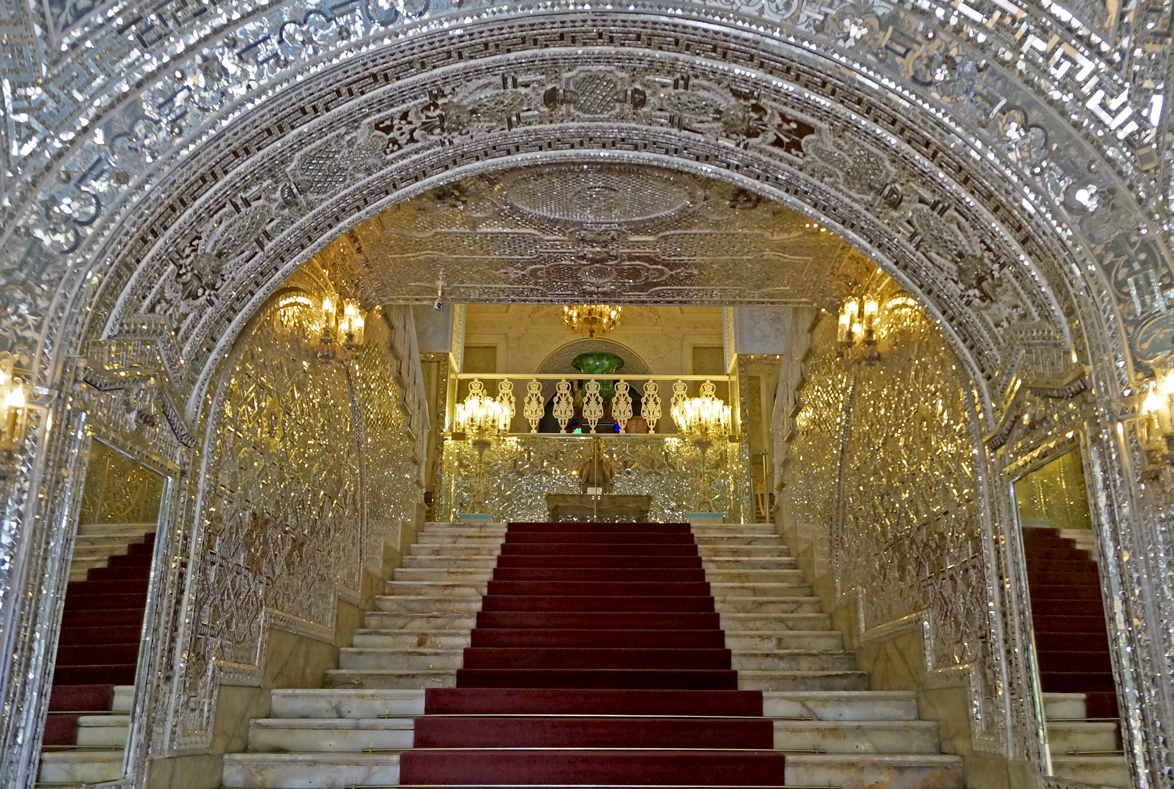
Ayeneh-kari on the stairs leading up to the Salam Hall of Golestan Palace, Tehran

== See also ==
- Glass mosaic, a similar Burmese mosaic technique
