= Chehel Sotoun =

Pavilion in Isfahan, Iran

Chehel Sotoun Palace کاخ چهل‌ستون
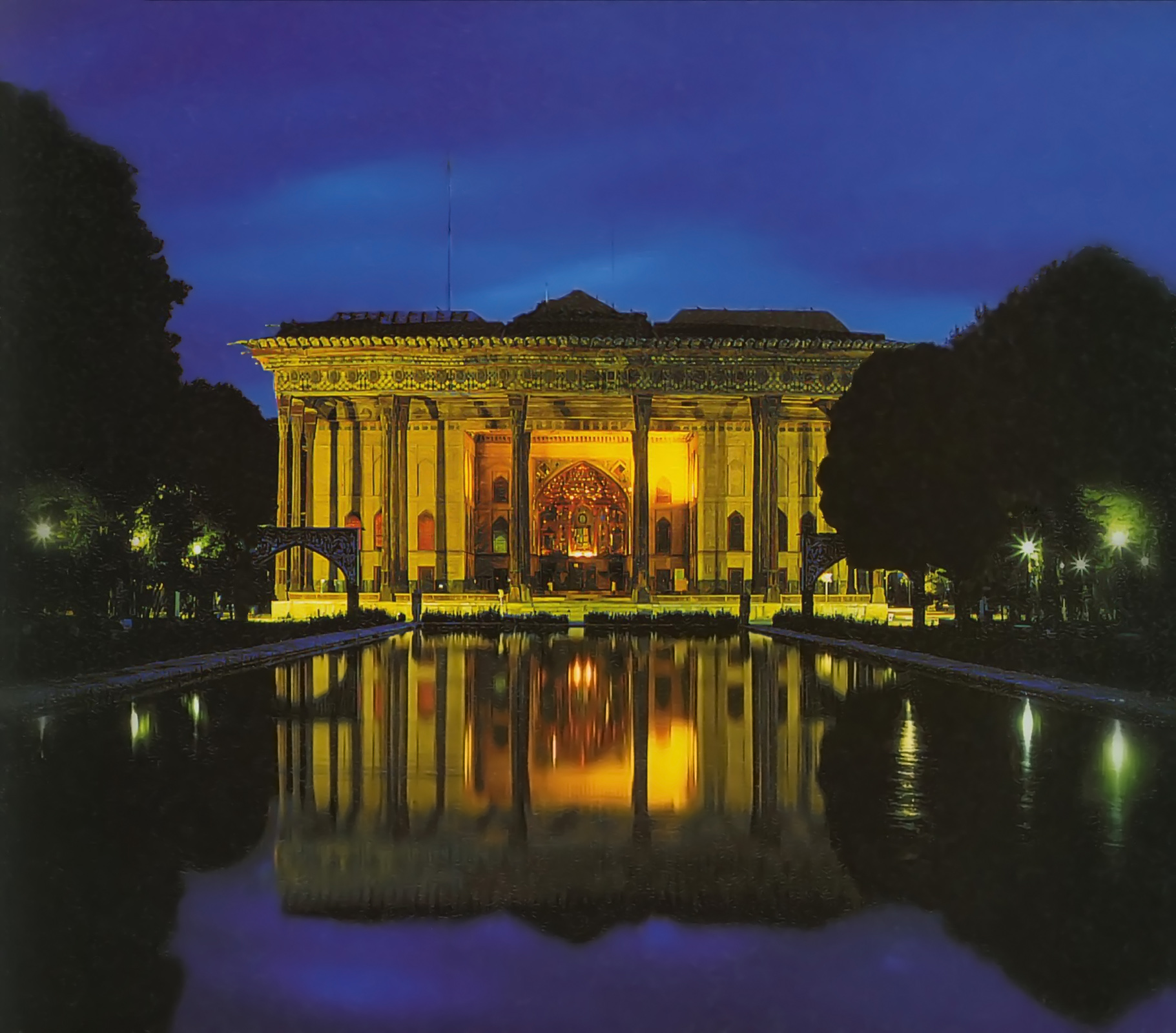

- Location within Iran
- 32°39′27″N 51°40′20″E
- Location: Isfahan, Isfahan Province, Iran

UNESCO World Heritage Site
- Official name: Chehel Sotoun Palace, part of The Persian Garden
- Type: Cultural
- Criteria: i,ii, iii , iv, vi
- Designated: 2011 (35th session)
- Reference no.: 1372-003
- Region: Asia-Pacific

Iran National Heritage List
- Official name: Chehel Sotoun Palace
- Type: Palace
- Designated: 1932
- Reference no.: 109
- Conservation organization: Cultural Heritage, Handicrafts and Tourism Organization of Iran

Chehel Sotoun (Persian: چهل‌ستون, lit. 'Forty Columns') is a 17th century pavilion and garden, in Isfahan, Iran. It was commissioned by Abbas the Great and completed by Shah Abbas II, both Safavid Shahs, mostly for royal entertainment and receptions. Chehel Sotoun Garden, along with eight other gardens all located in Iran, have been inscribed as Persian Gardens World Heritage Sites since 2011.

== Early paintings (1647–1666) ==
As with the Ali Qapu, the palace contains many frescoes and paintings on ceramic. Many of the ceramic panels have been dispersed and are now in the possession of major museums in the West. Four of the major frescoes are thought to have been painted circa 1650, and in any case between 1647 (date of the construction of the Chehel Sotoun) and 1666, based on stylistic grounds, and on the fact that Jean Chardin described the specific paintings as "three royal entertainments and one battle scene" during his visit in 1666. They were commissioned by the Safavid ruler Abbas II. They are:

- the Battle of Marv in 1510 where the Safavid Shah Ismail I vanquished and killed the Uzbek king Shaybani Khan
- the welcoming by Shah Tahmasp of the Mughal Emperor Humayun taking refuge in Iran in 1544
- the reception by Abbas the Great of the Uzbek ruler Vali Muhammad Khan
- the reception of Uzbek king Nader Mohammad Khan by Abbas II in 1646, when the palace had just been completed
Chehel Sotoun's wall paintings of Safavid historical scenes (painted circa 1650)

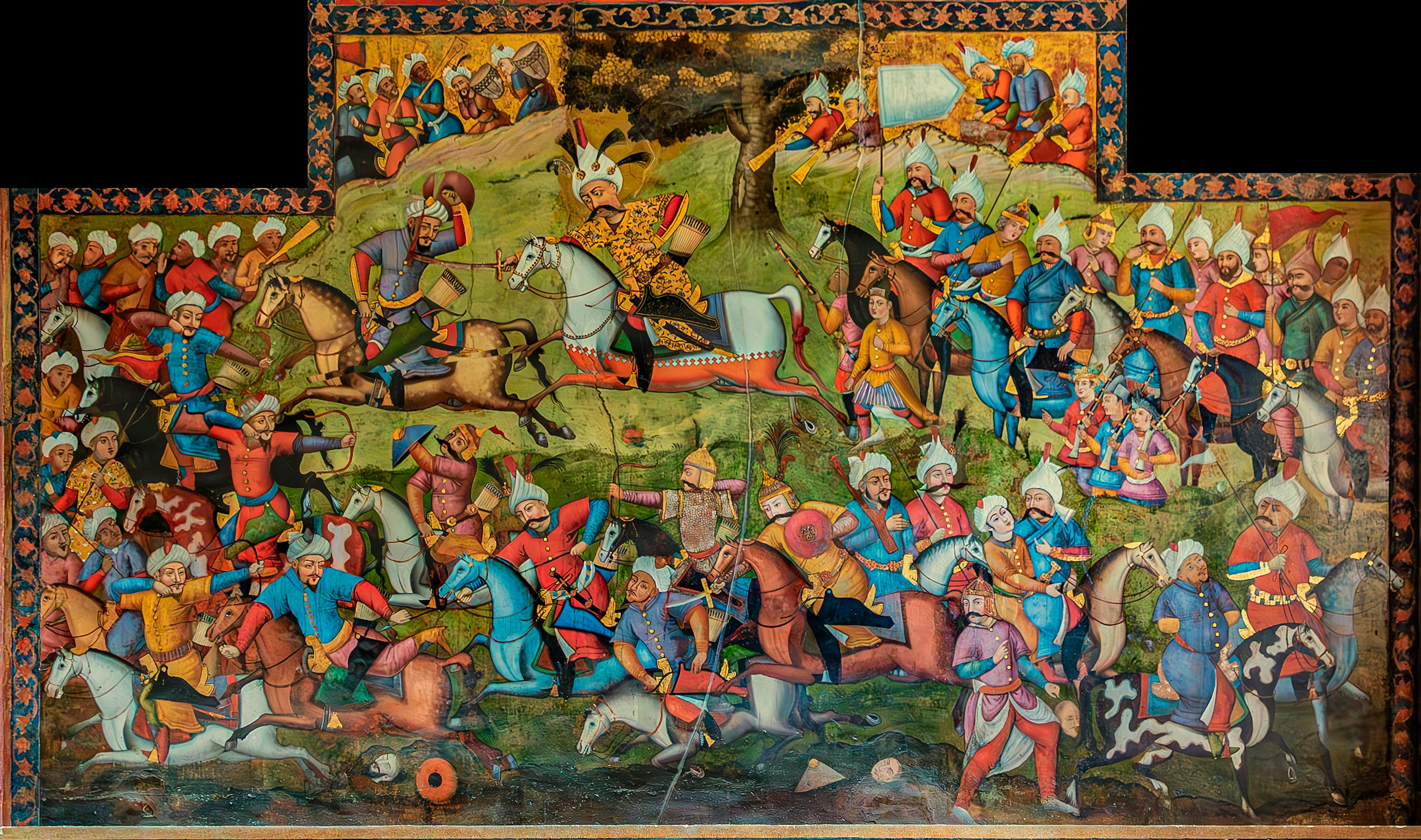
Battle of Merv (1510), between Ismail I and Shaybani Khan

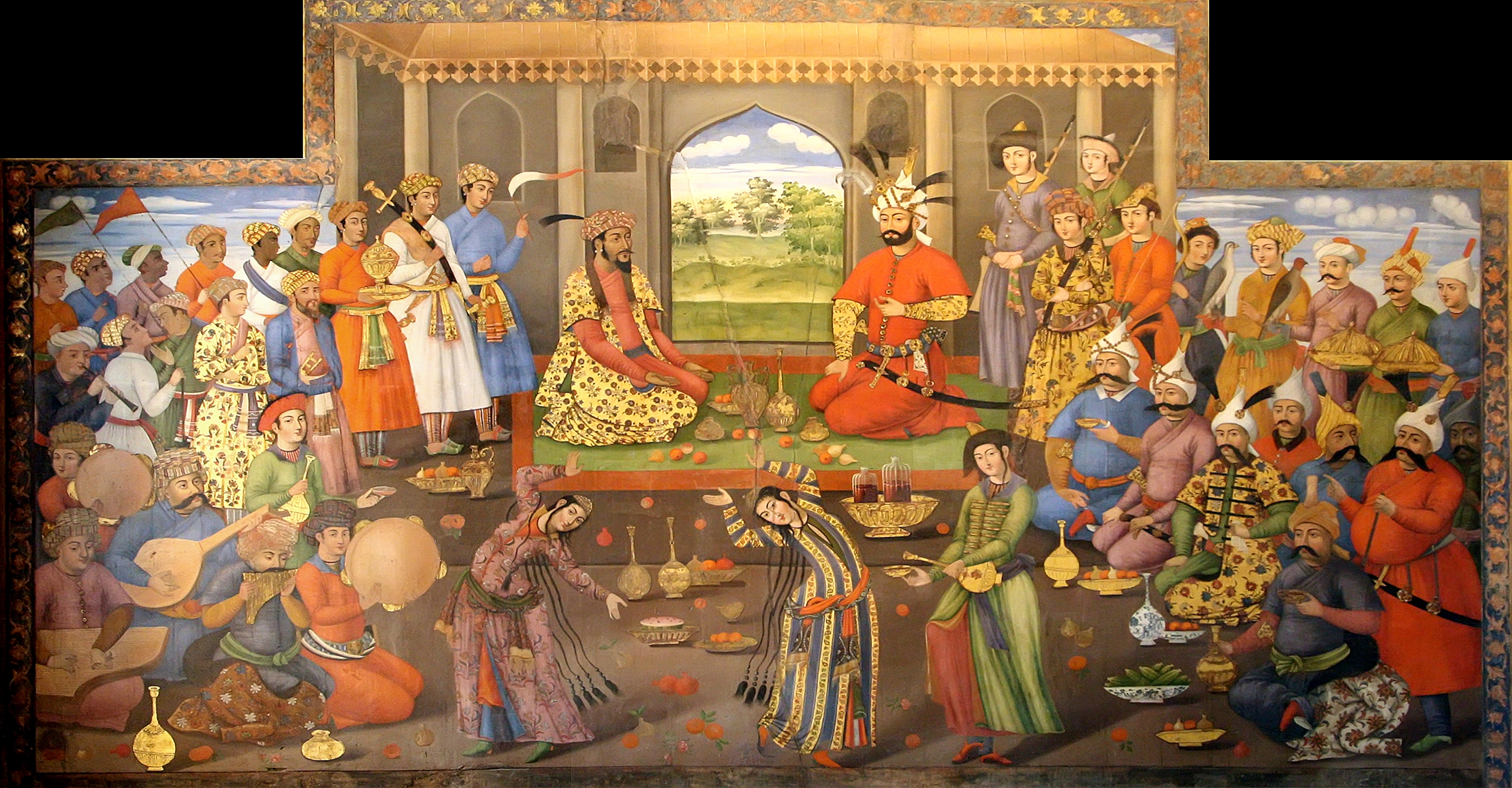
Meeting of Tahmasp I and Humayun

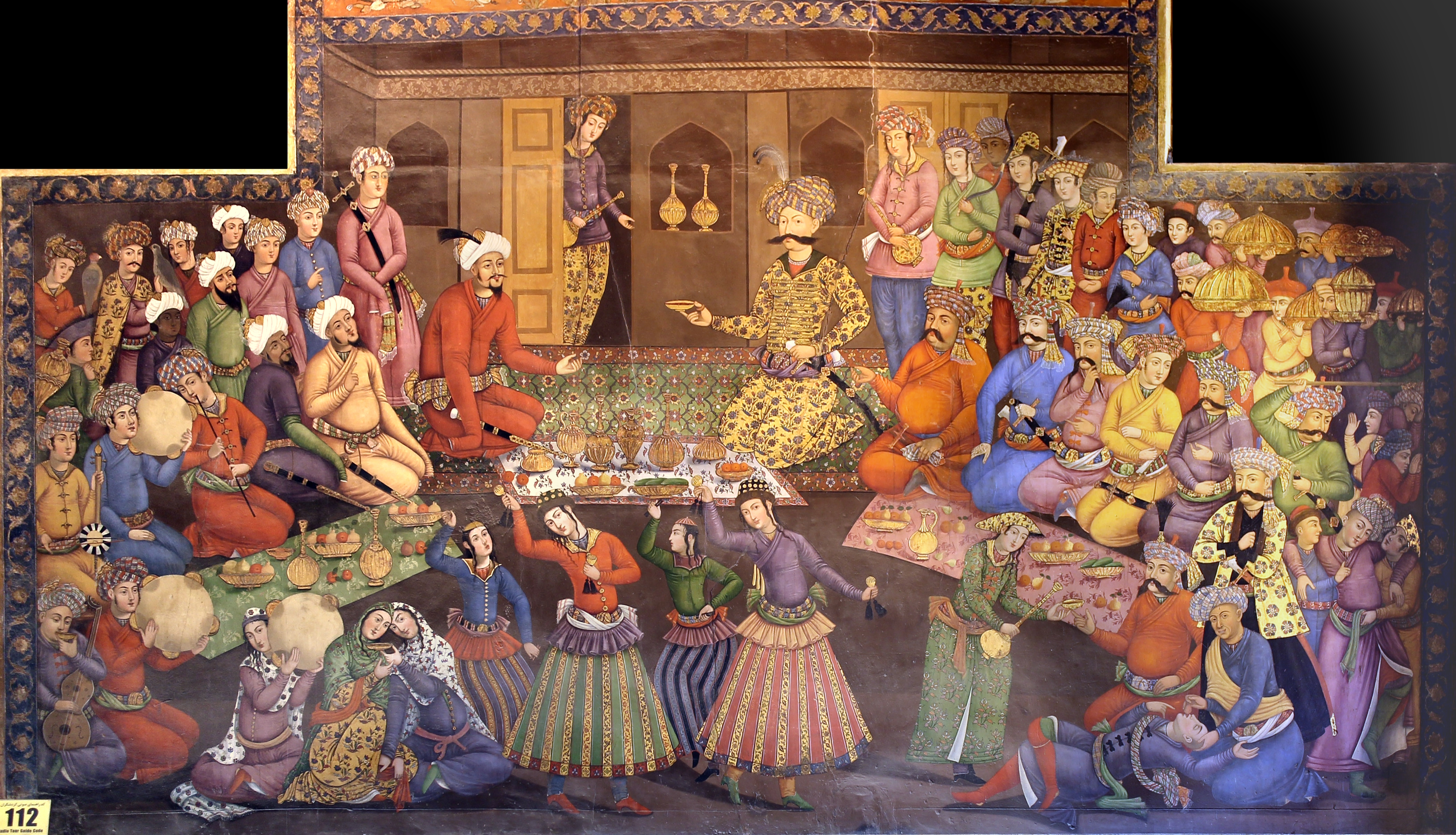
Meeting of Abbas the Great and Vali Muhammad Khan

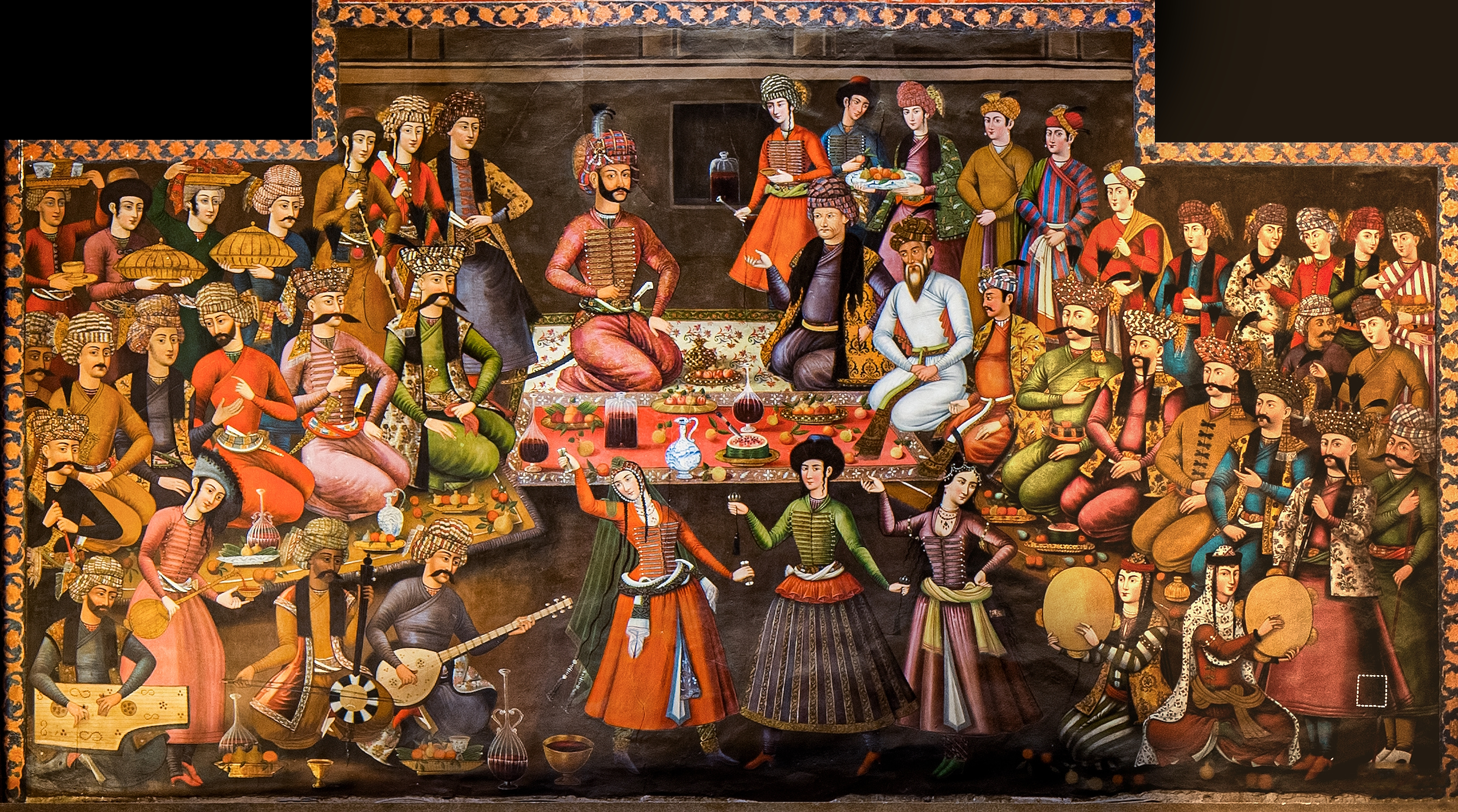
Meeting of Abbas II and Nader Mohammad Khan

== Later paintings ==
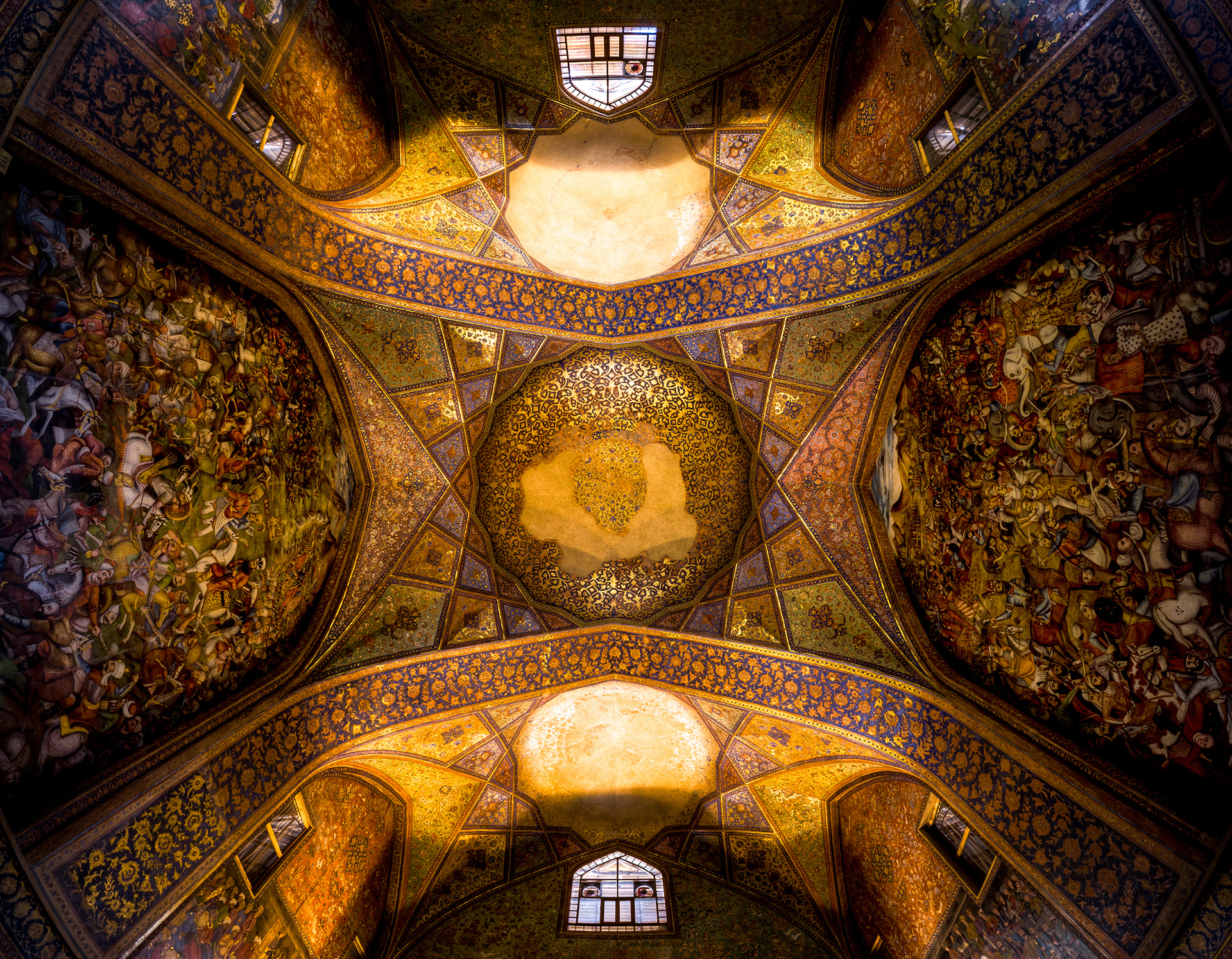
Ceiling artworks and wall paintings

There are also more recent paintings, generally dating to Qajar era, such as the infamous Battle of Chaldiran against the Ottoman Sultan Selim I, and Nader Shah's victory against the Indian Army at Karnal in 1739. There are also less historical, but more aesthetic compositions in the traditional miniature style, themed around life, love, and joy.

== Architecture ==
In the pavilion, the combined designs of the walls and ceiling of the hall, which are placed in Lachak Toranj (corner and medallion), and the main lines of the building divisions, which are a combination of painting, tiling, ayeneh-kari, and various other decorations, make the building one of the best examples of Persian architecture during the Safavid era. At present, the mansion operates as a museum; and its central hall displays some works of art from different periods of Iran.

== Gallery ==
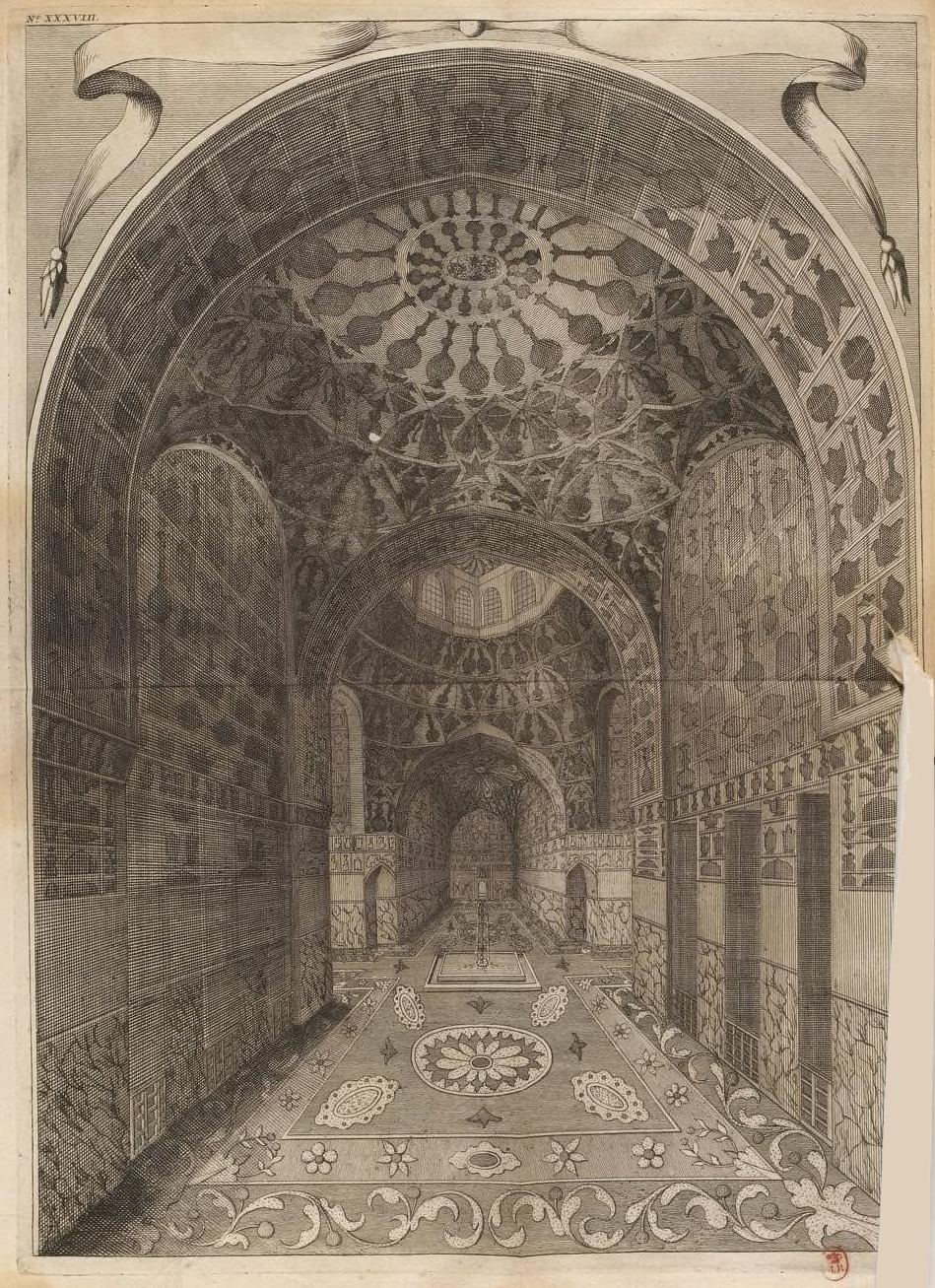
Interior of Chehel Sotun by Jean Chardin, 1666

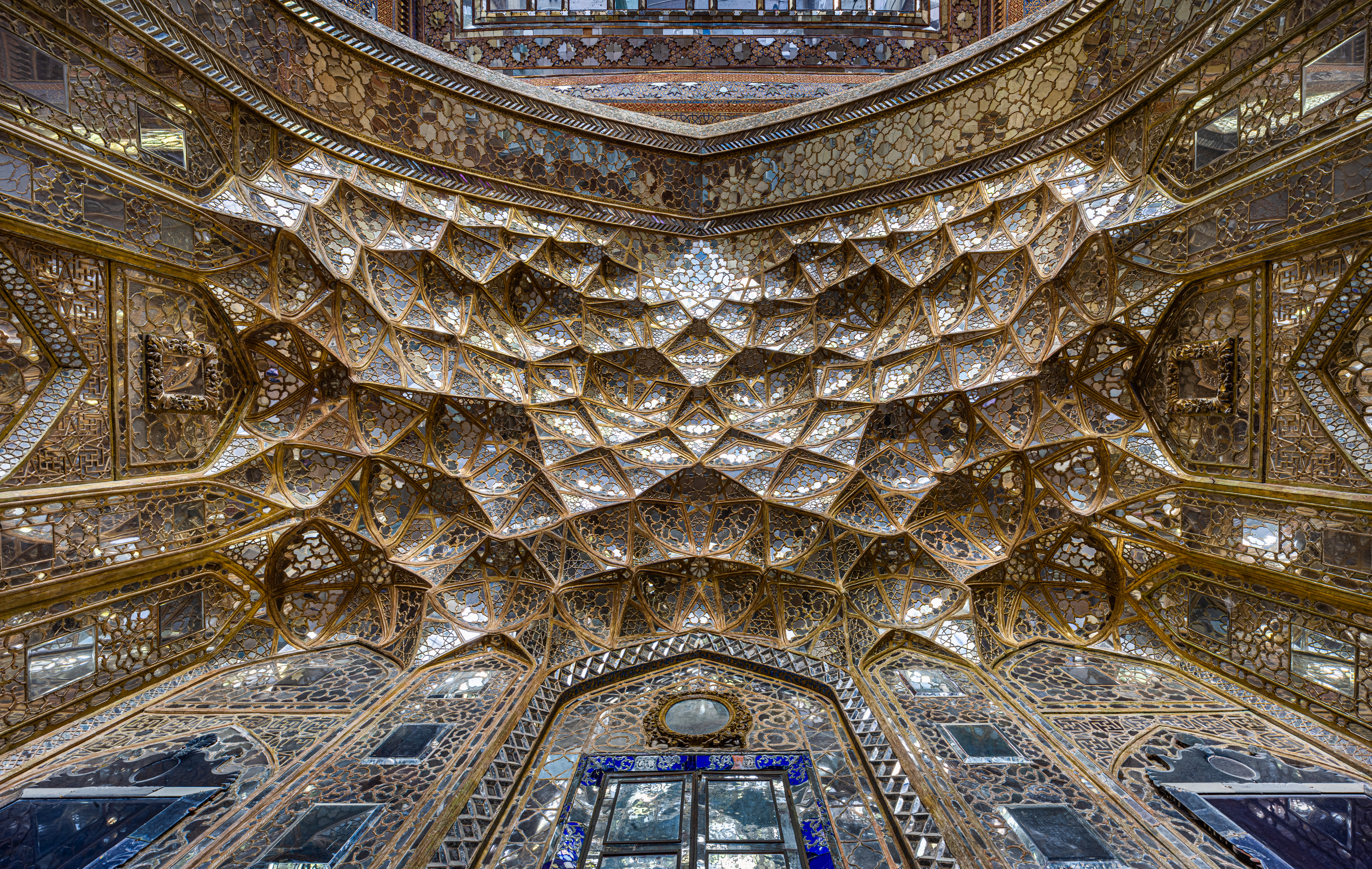
Muqarnas featuring Ayeneh-kari

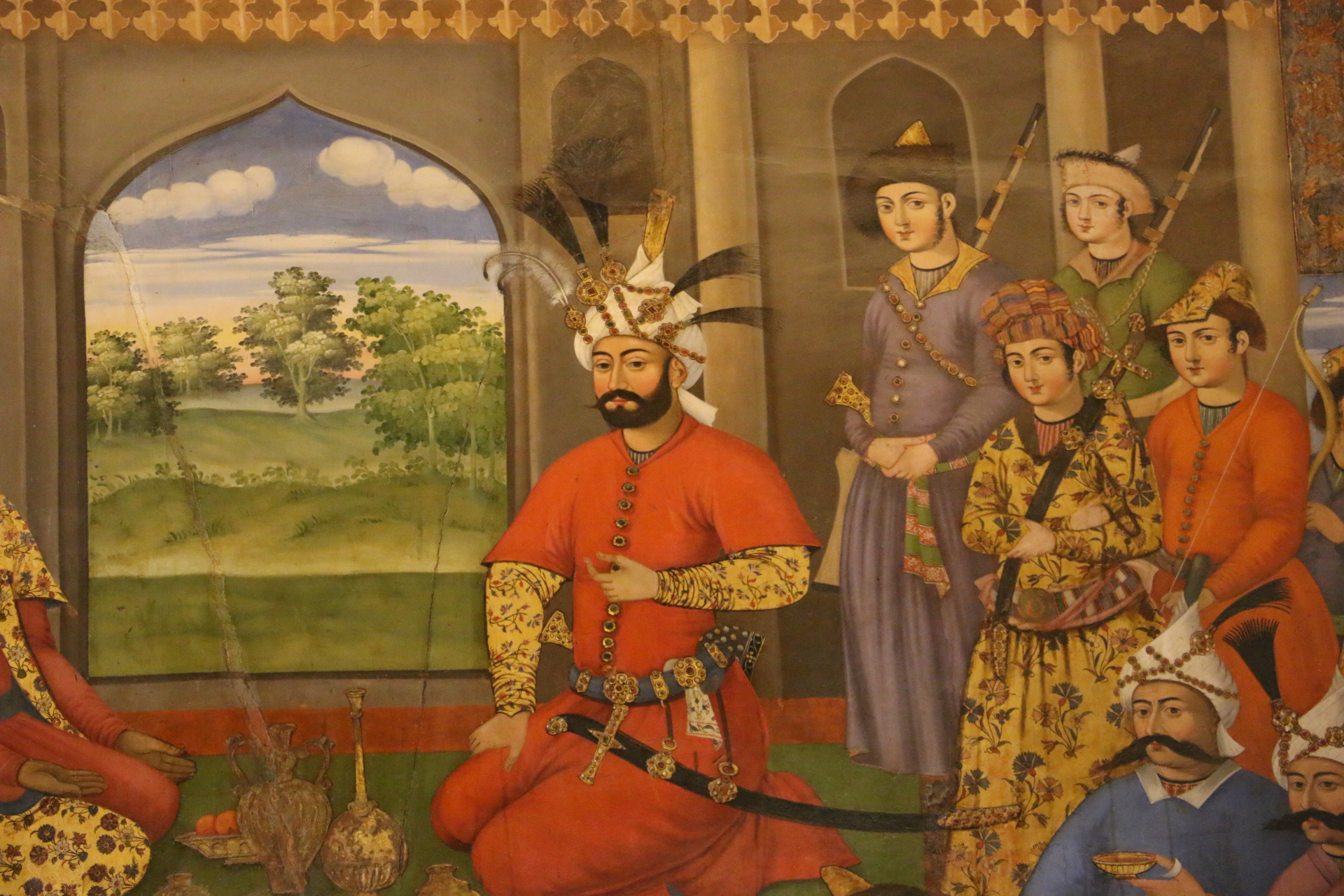
Shah Tahmasp I, painted circa 1647

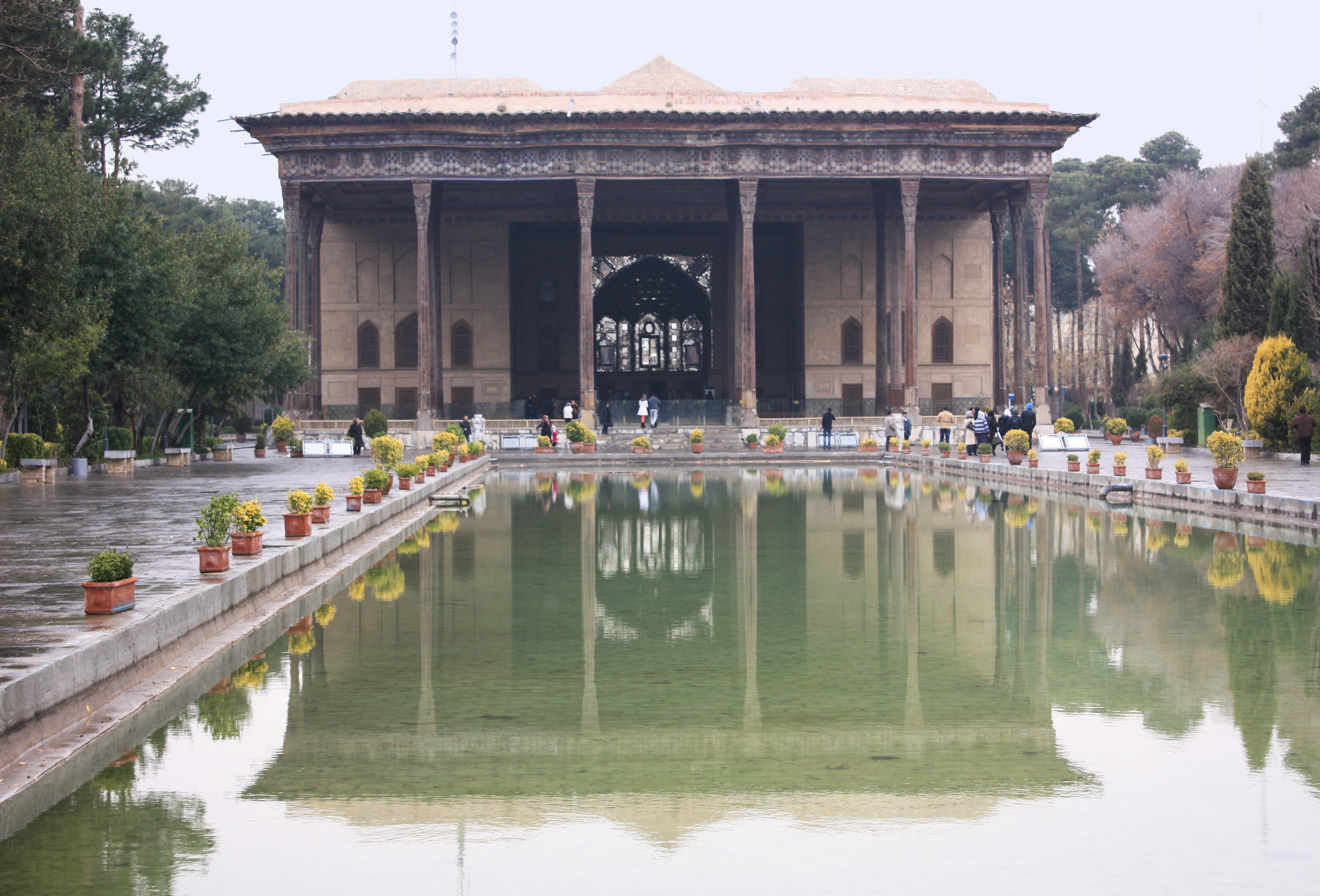
Day view of the palace

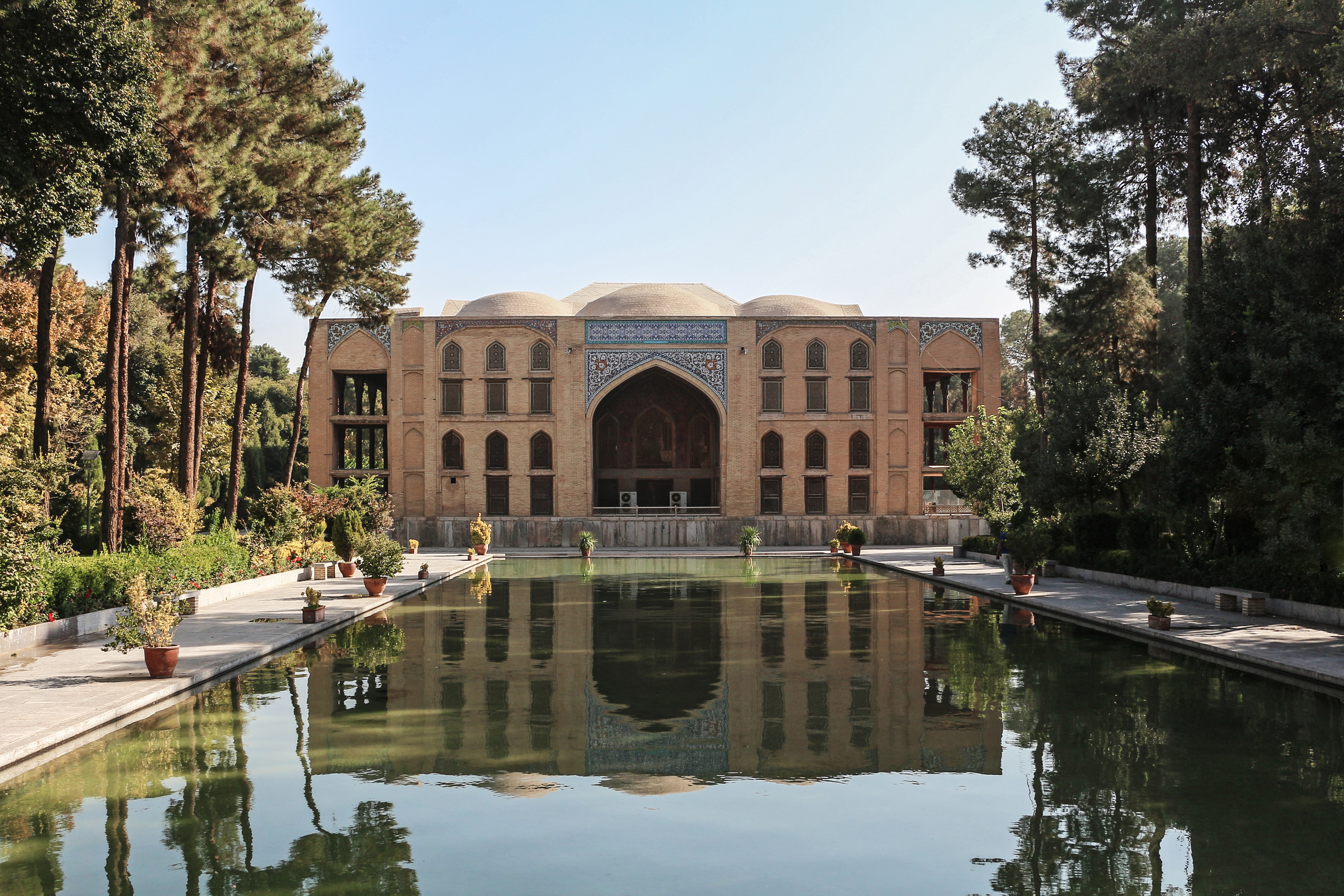
Rear view of the palace

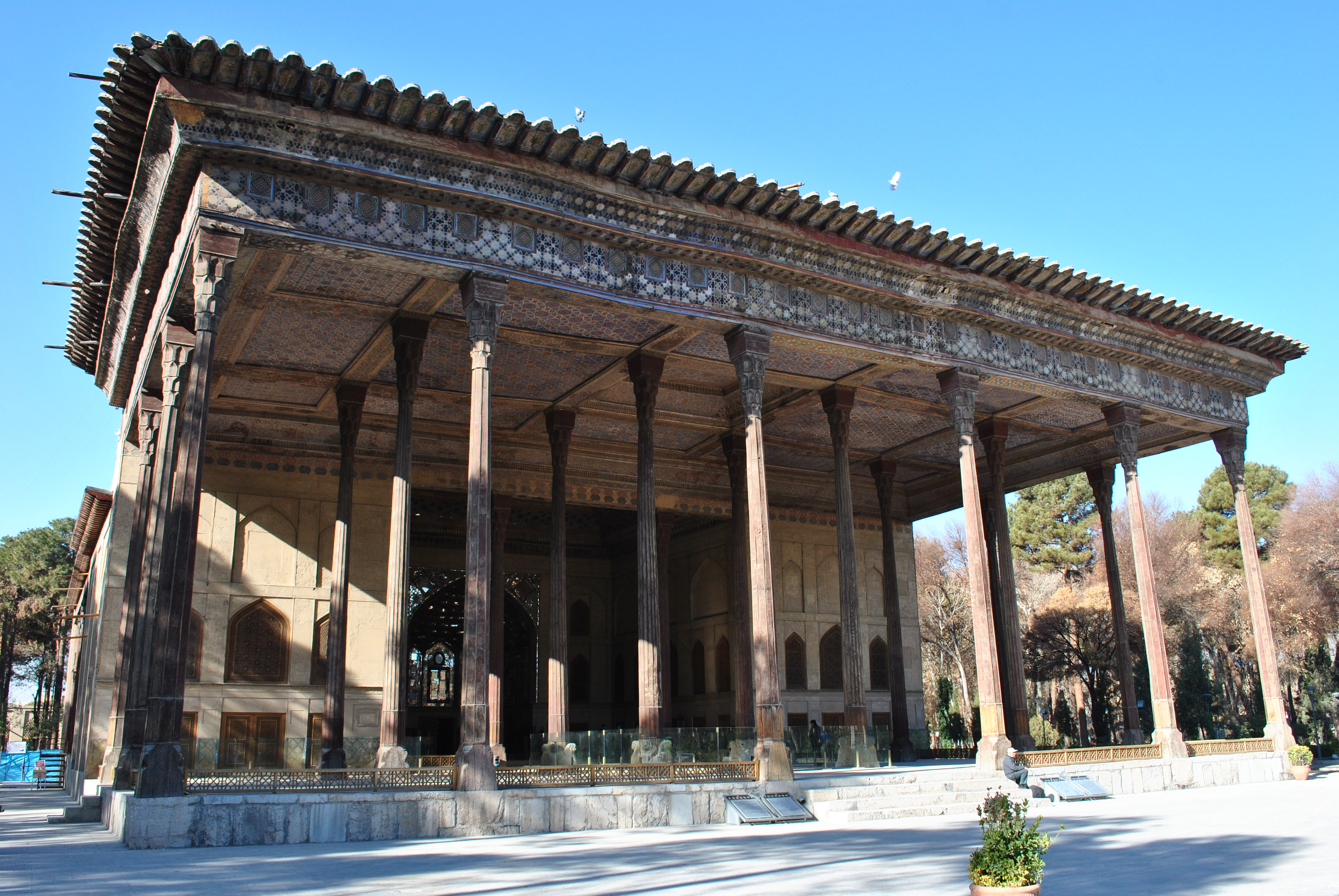
Closer view of the palace

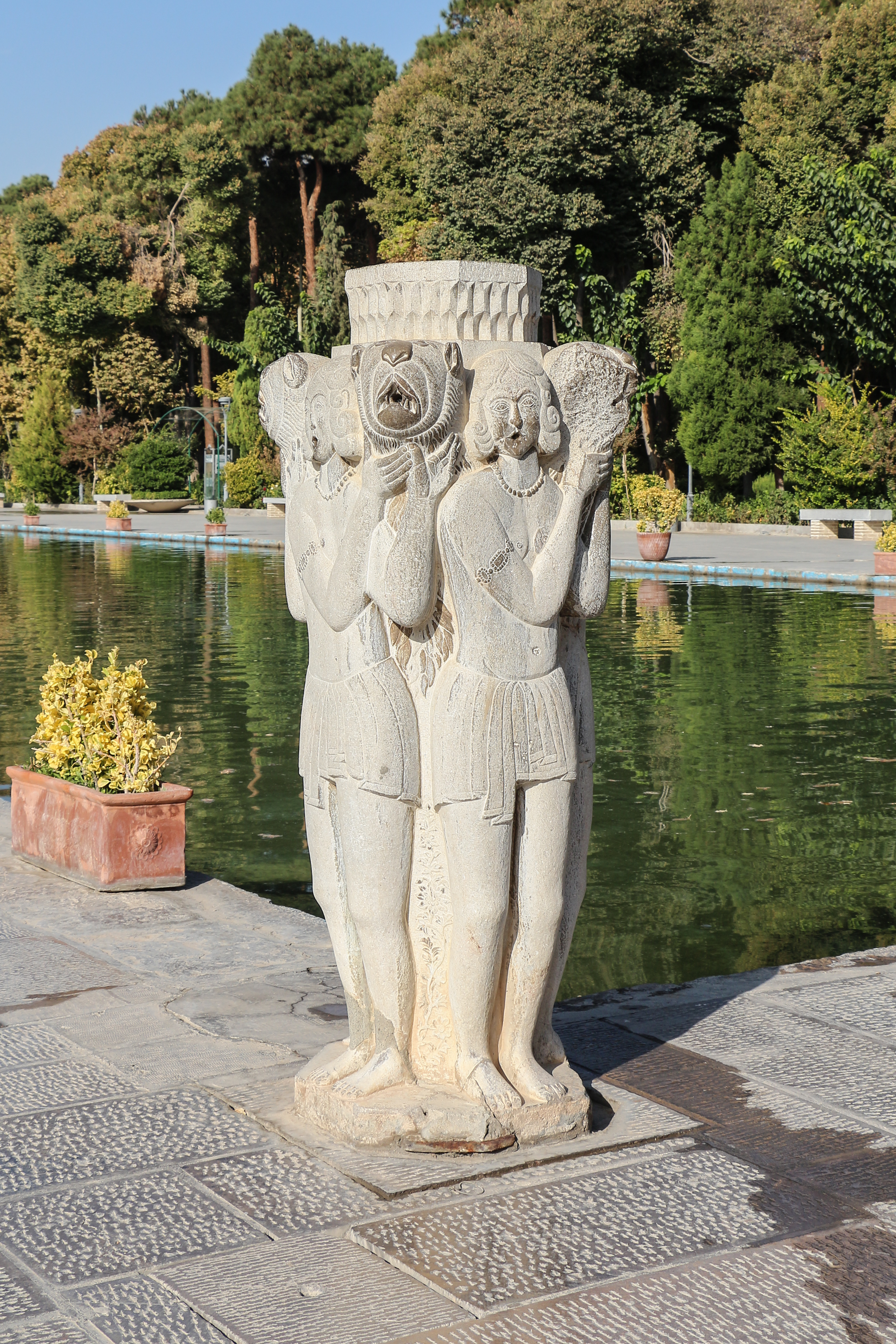
A sculpture in the garden

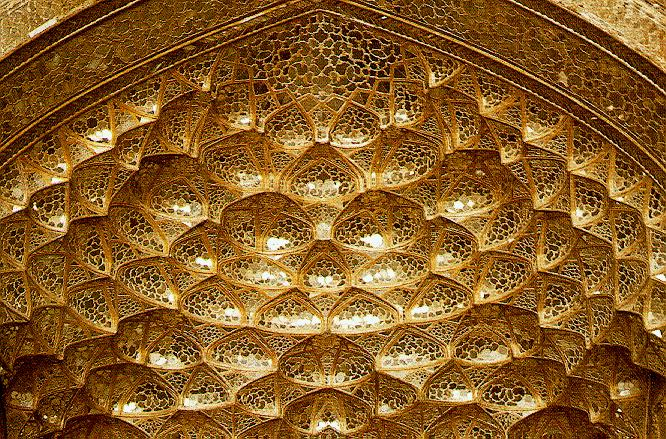
Golden muqarnas vaulting

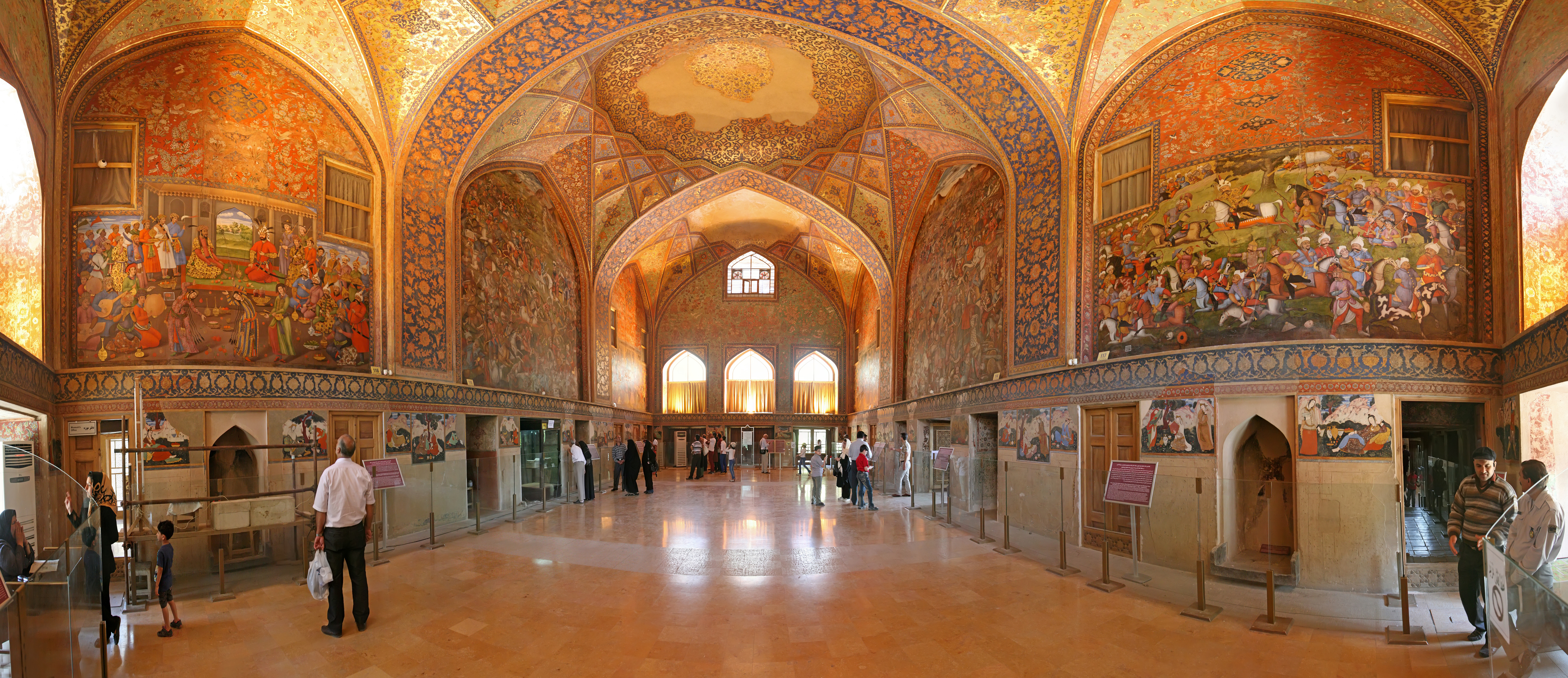
Interior of the museum

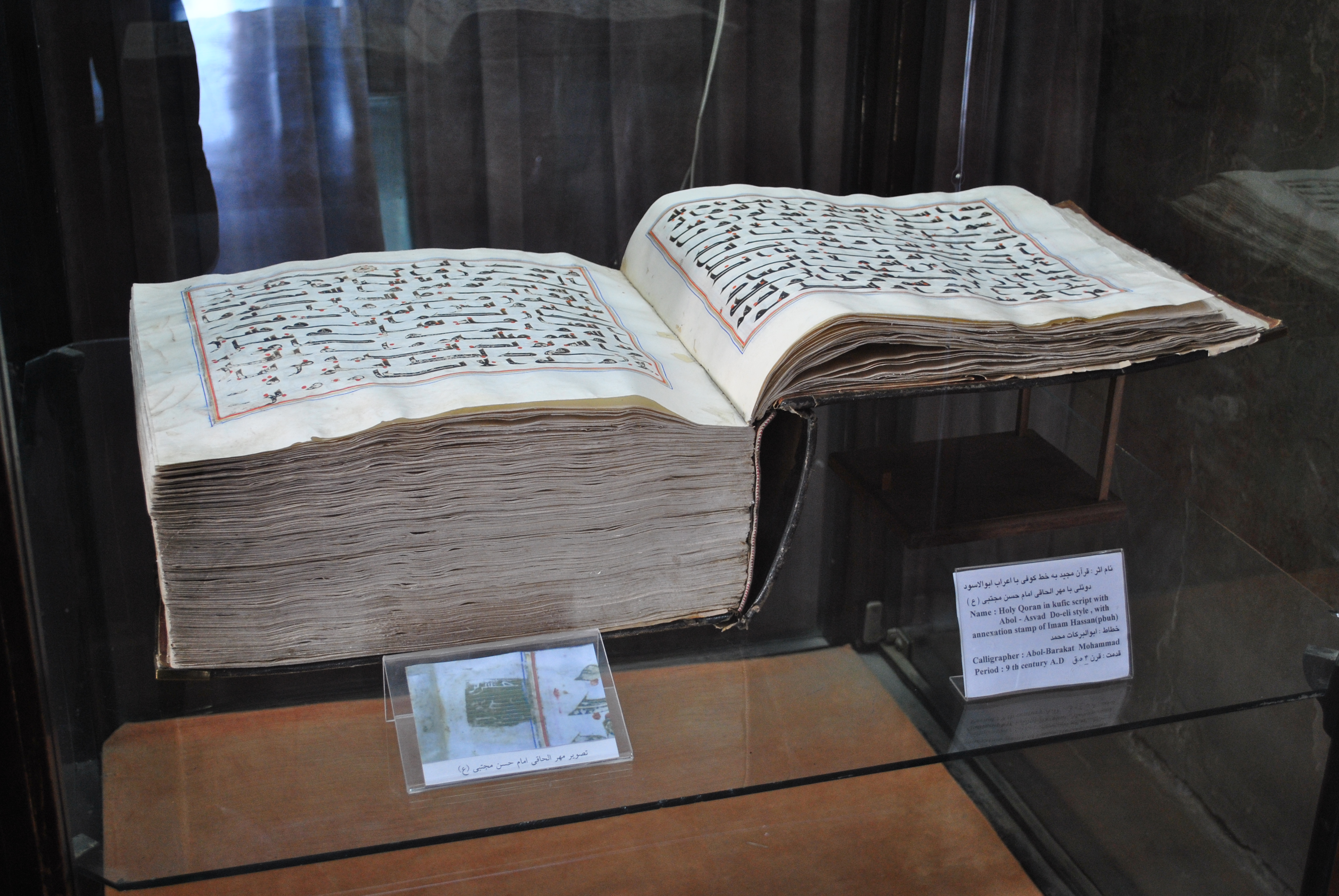
The Qur'an in kufic script

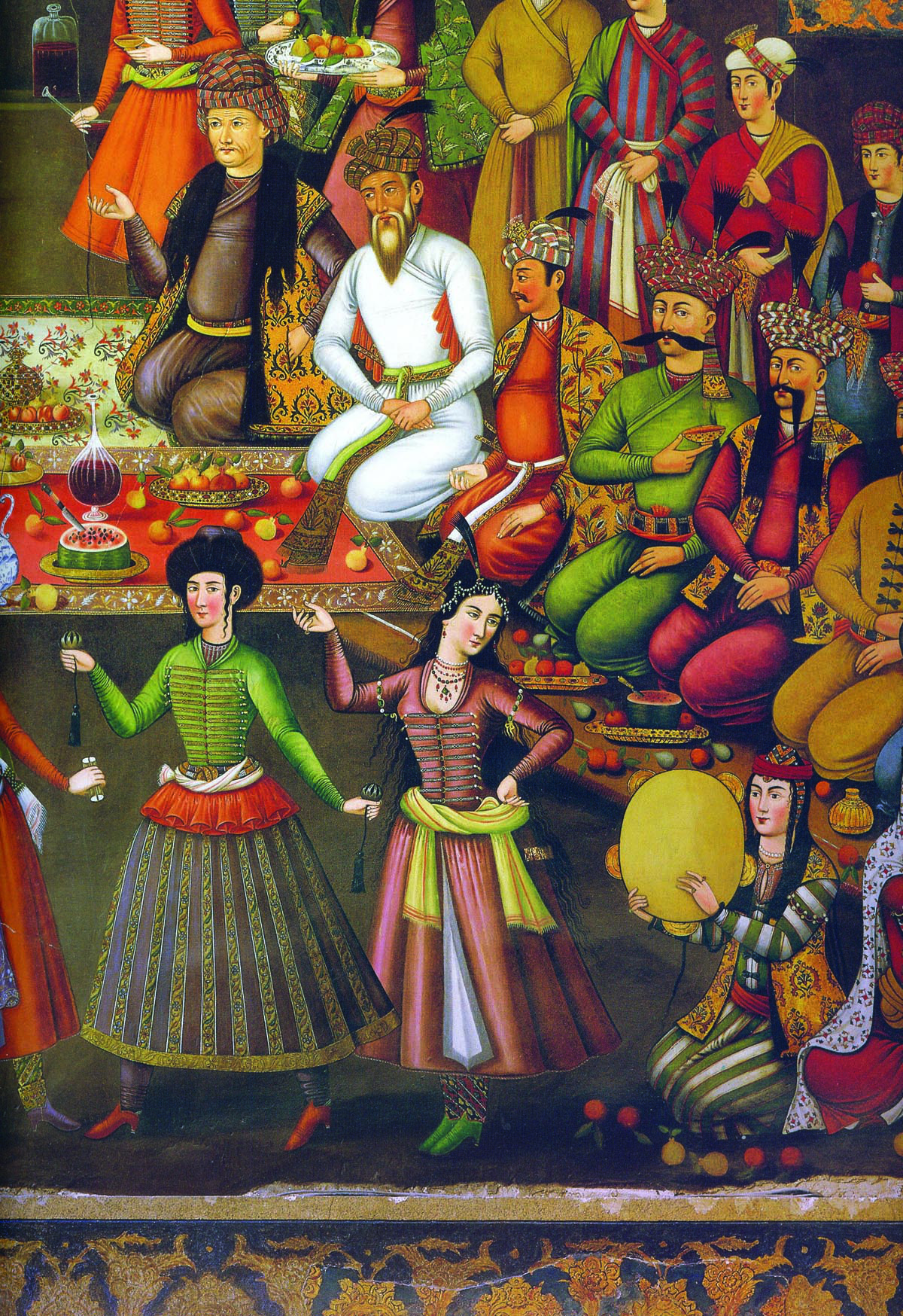
Fresco inside the palace

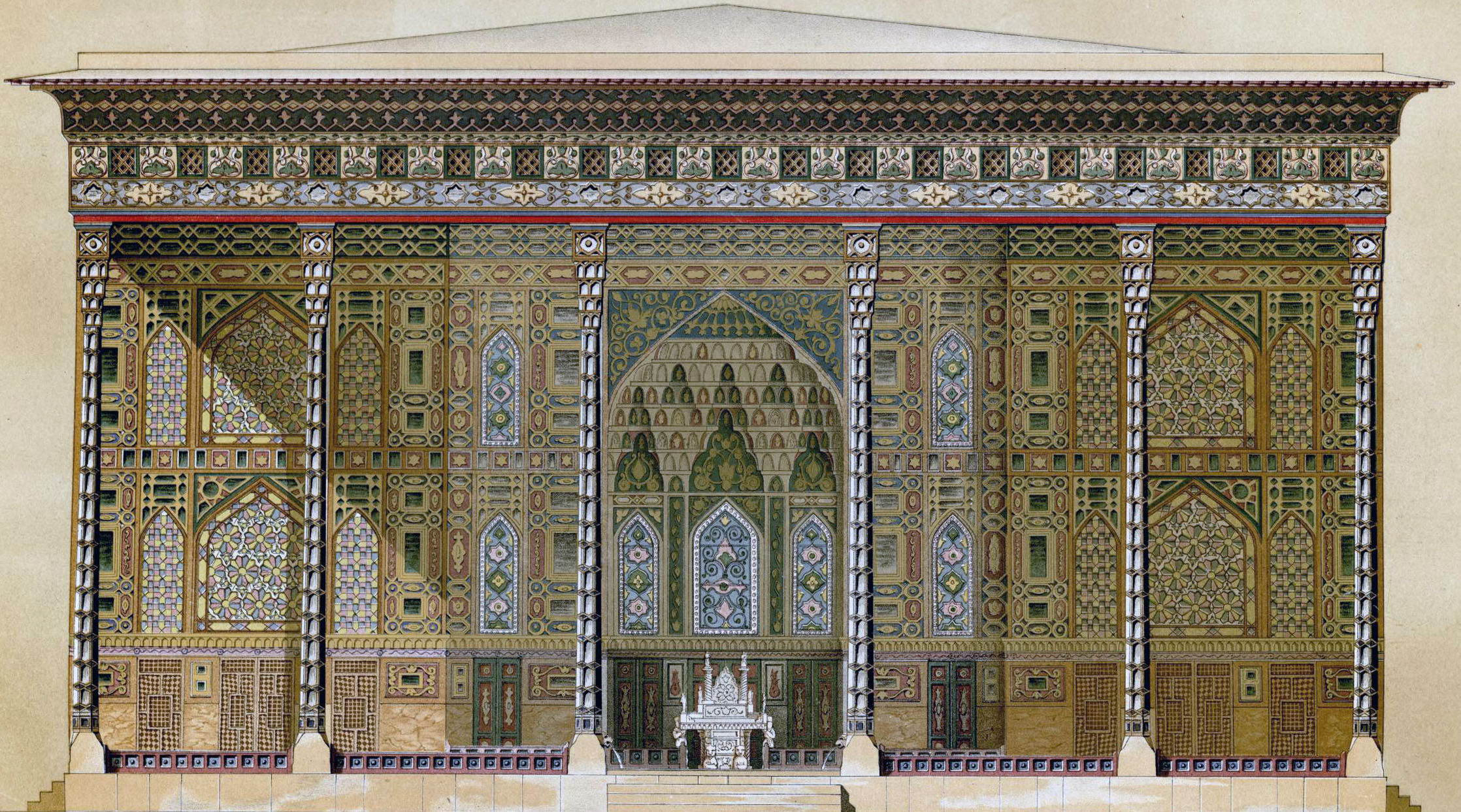
1840, by Pascal Coste

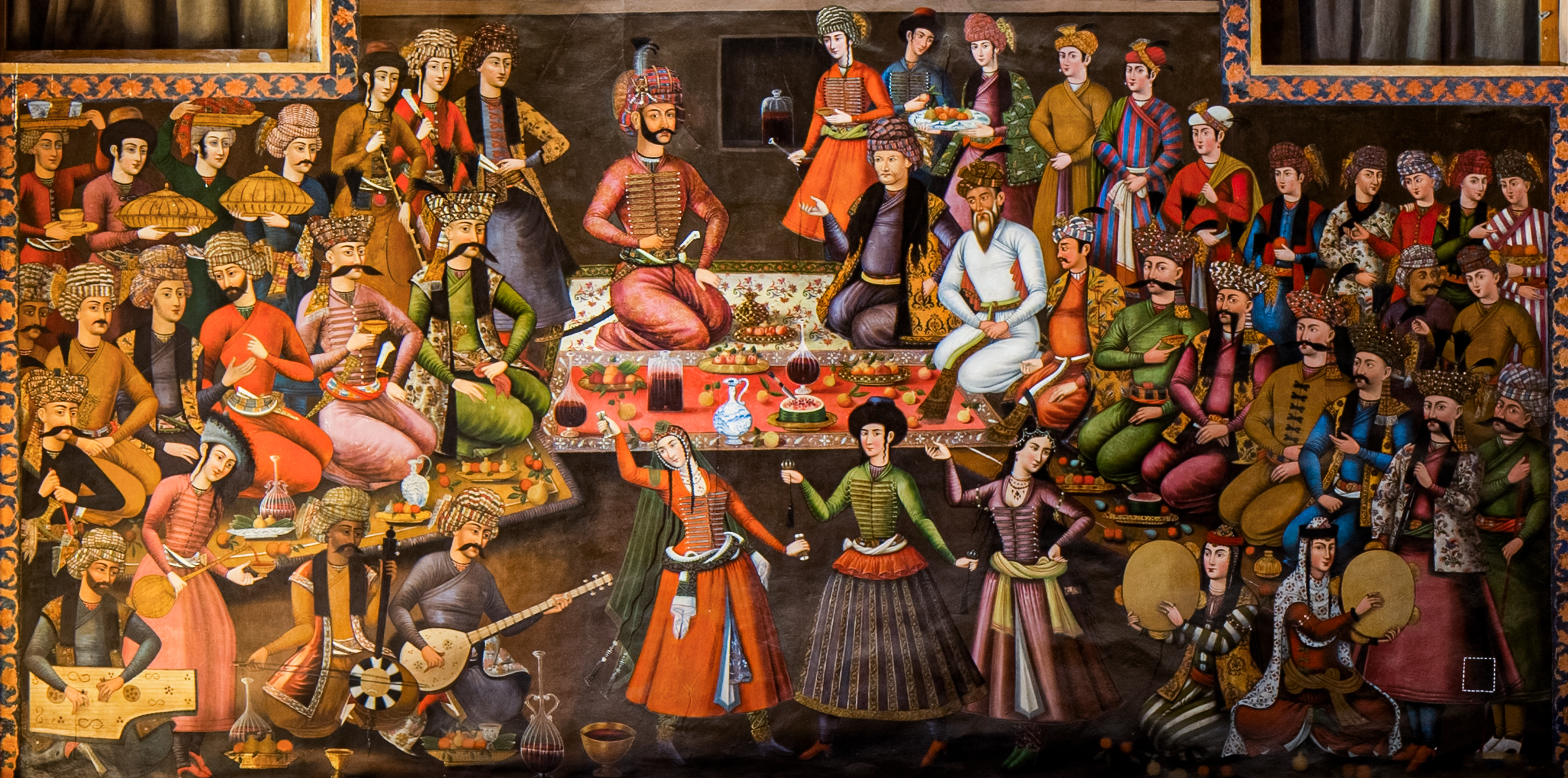
Fresco inside the palace, painted circa 1647

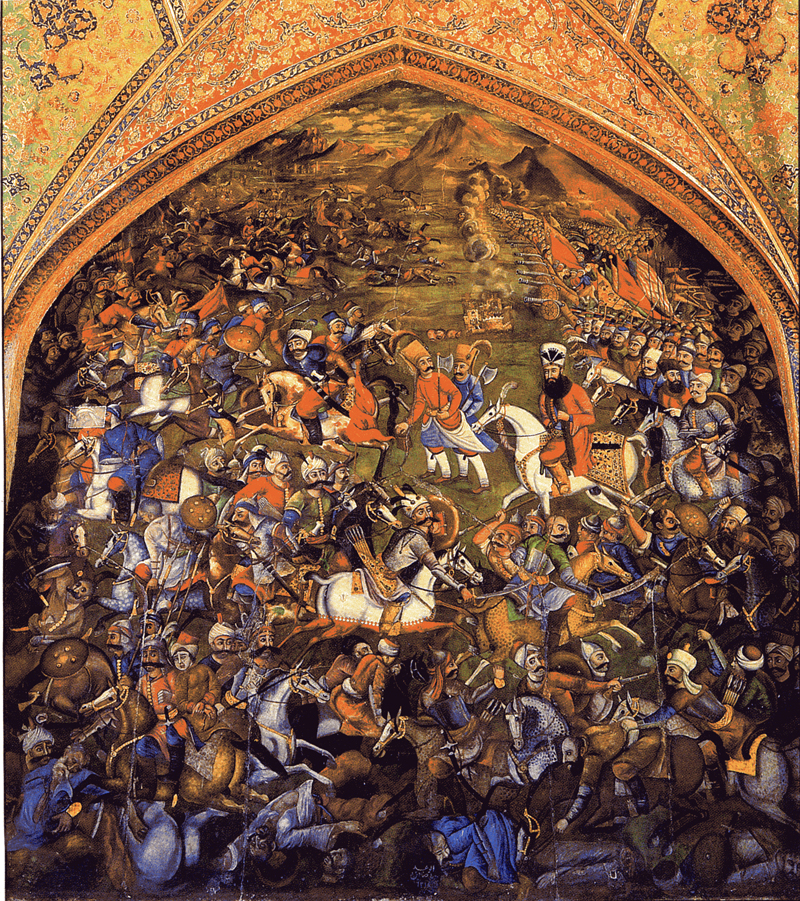
Frescoe of the Battle of Chaldiran, 19th century

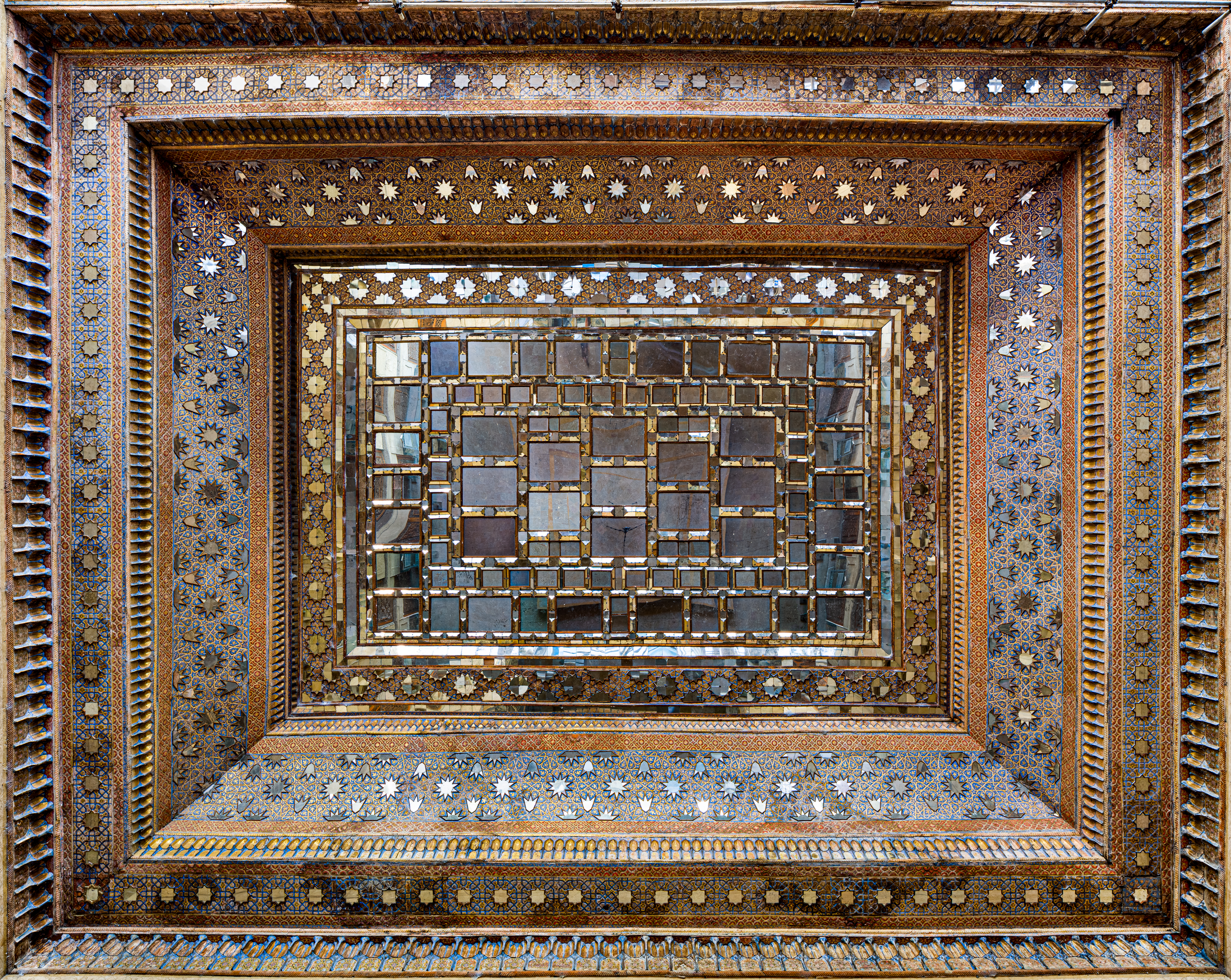
Ceiling of the mirror hall with Ayeneh-kari art

== Bibliography ==
- M. Ferrante: 'Čihil Sutūn: Etudes, relevés, restauration', Travaux de restauration de monuments historiques en Iran, ed. G. Zander (Rome, 1968), pp. 293–322
- E. Grube: 'Wall Paintings in the Seventeenth Century Monuments of Isfahan', Studies on Isfahan, ed. R. Holod, 2 vols, Iran. Stud., vii (1974), pp. 511–42
- S. Babaie: 'Shah Abbas II, the Conquest of Qandahar, the Chihil Sutun, and its Wall Paintings', Muqarnas, xi (1994), pp. 125–42
