= Mofakham's House of Mirrors =

Iranian national heritage site in Bojnord

Coordinates: 37°29′03″N 57°19′58″E

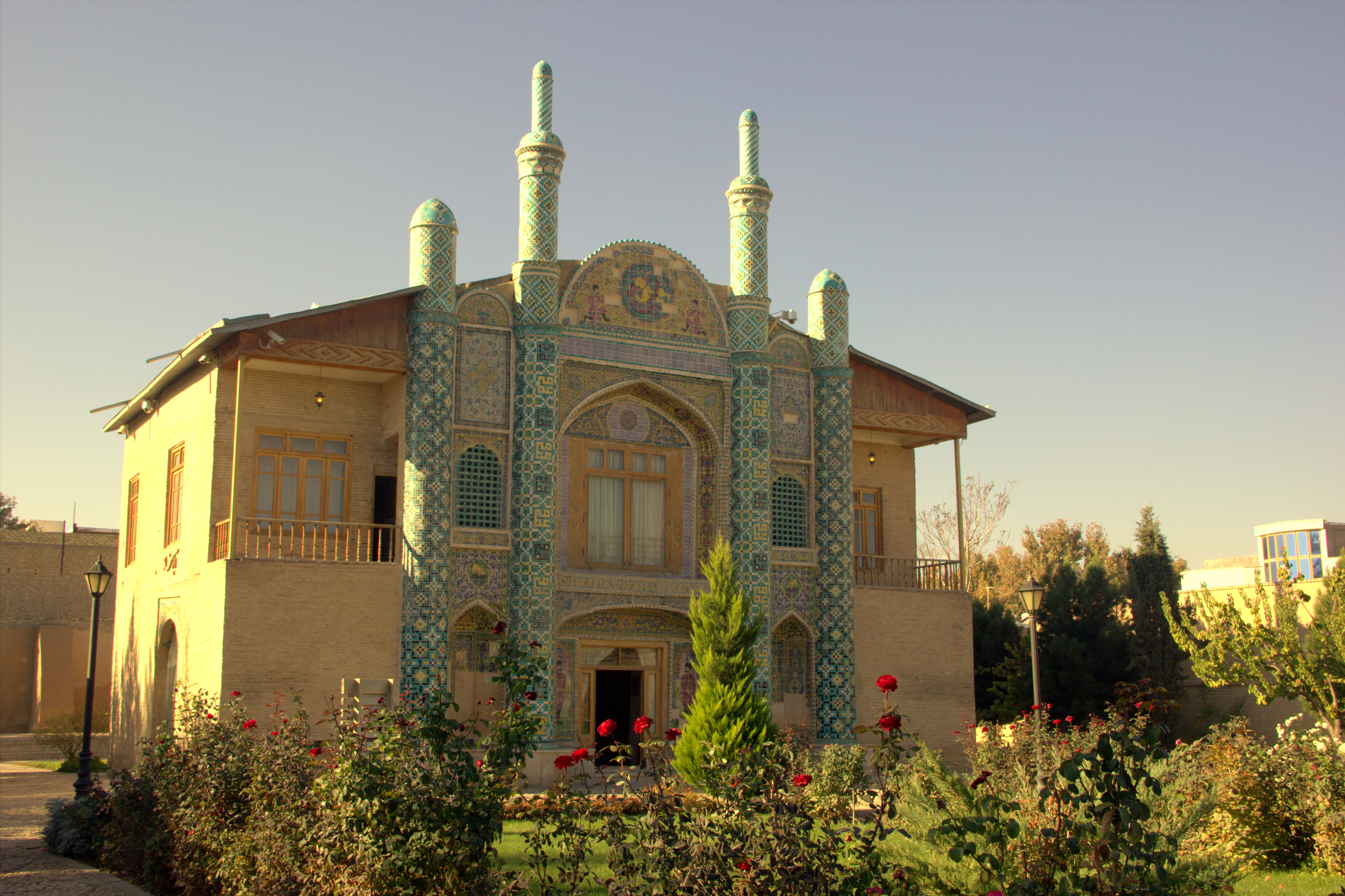
- Interactive map of the Mofakham's House of Mirrors area

General information
- Location: Bojnord, Iran

Mofakham's House of Mirrors (Persian: آئینه‌خانه مفخم, romanized: Ayene khane Mofakham) is a historic building in Bojnord, North Khorasan province, Iran. Dating from the Qajar era, it was constructed during the reign of Naser al-Din Shah Qajar by the mayor at the time, known as Mofakham. It is features ayeneh-kari, a style of Persian interior decoration which features finely-cut mirrors assembled in intricate geometric designs.

== Museum ==
In 1991, Iran's Cultural Heritage Organization took over the mansion and turned it into the Museum of Anthropology and Archaeology.

== Gallery ==
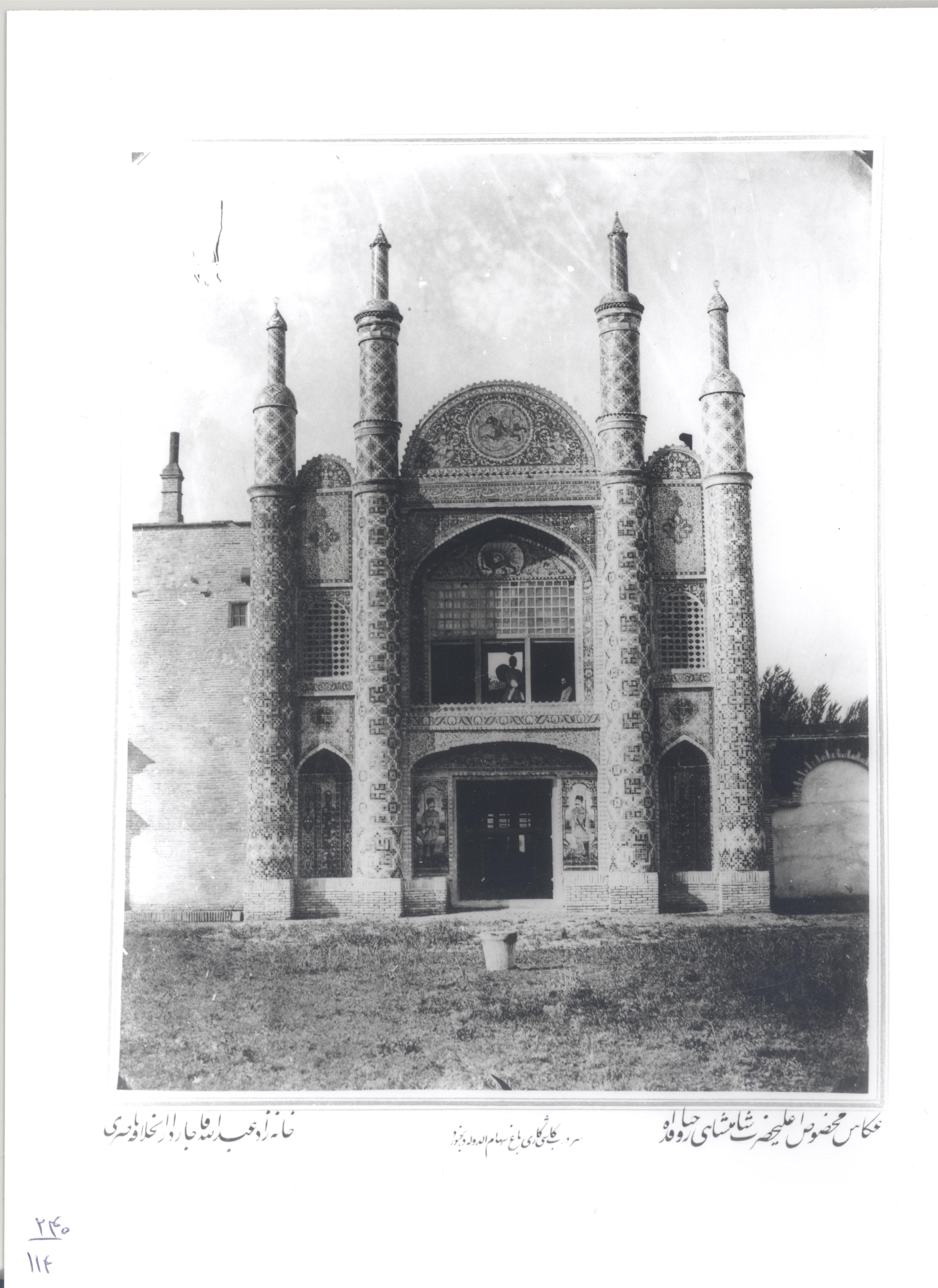
The house by Abdollah Mirza Qajar, 1894

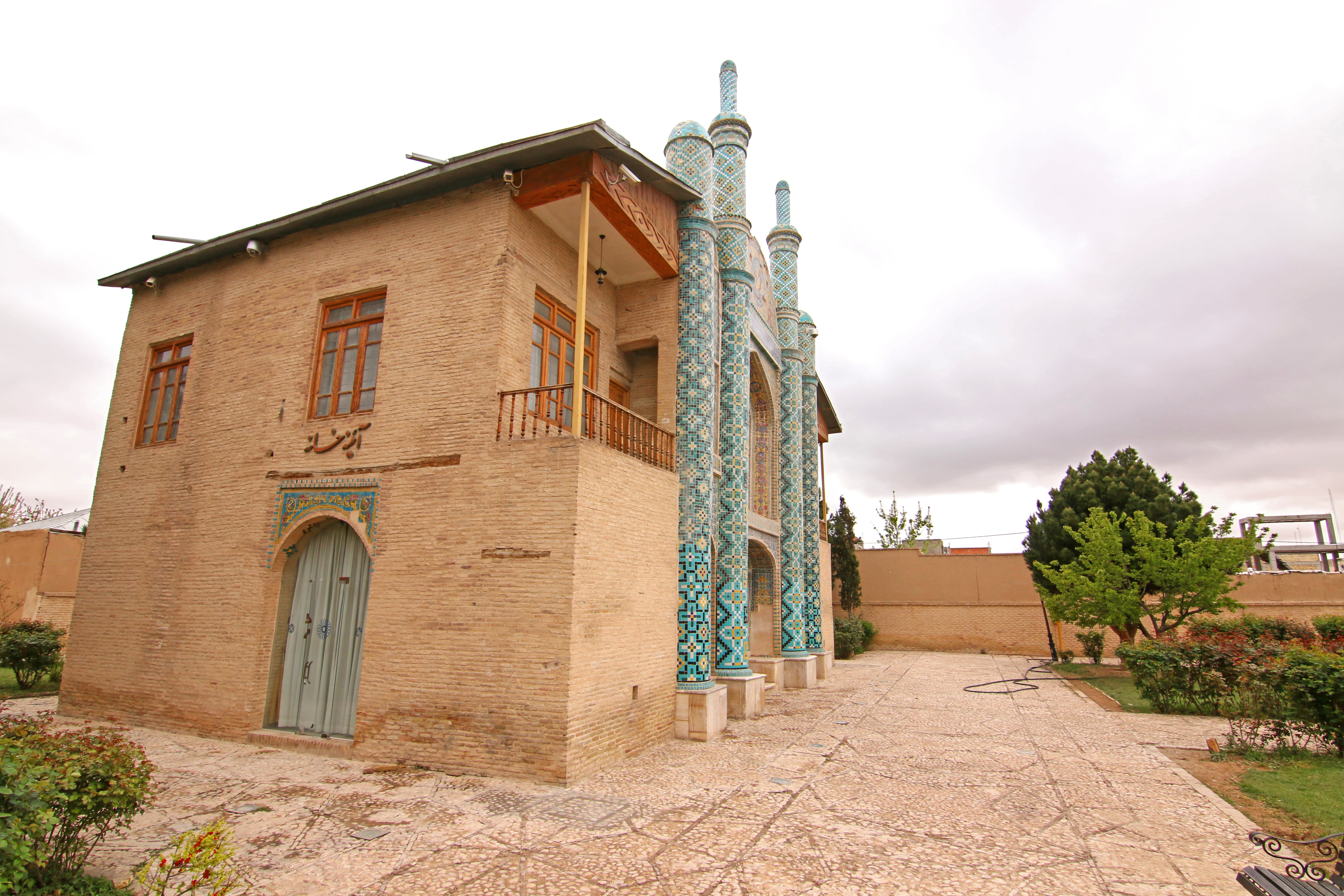
side view

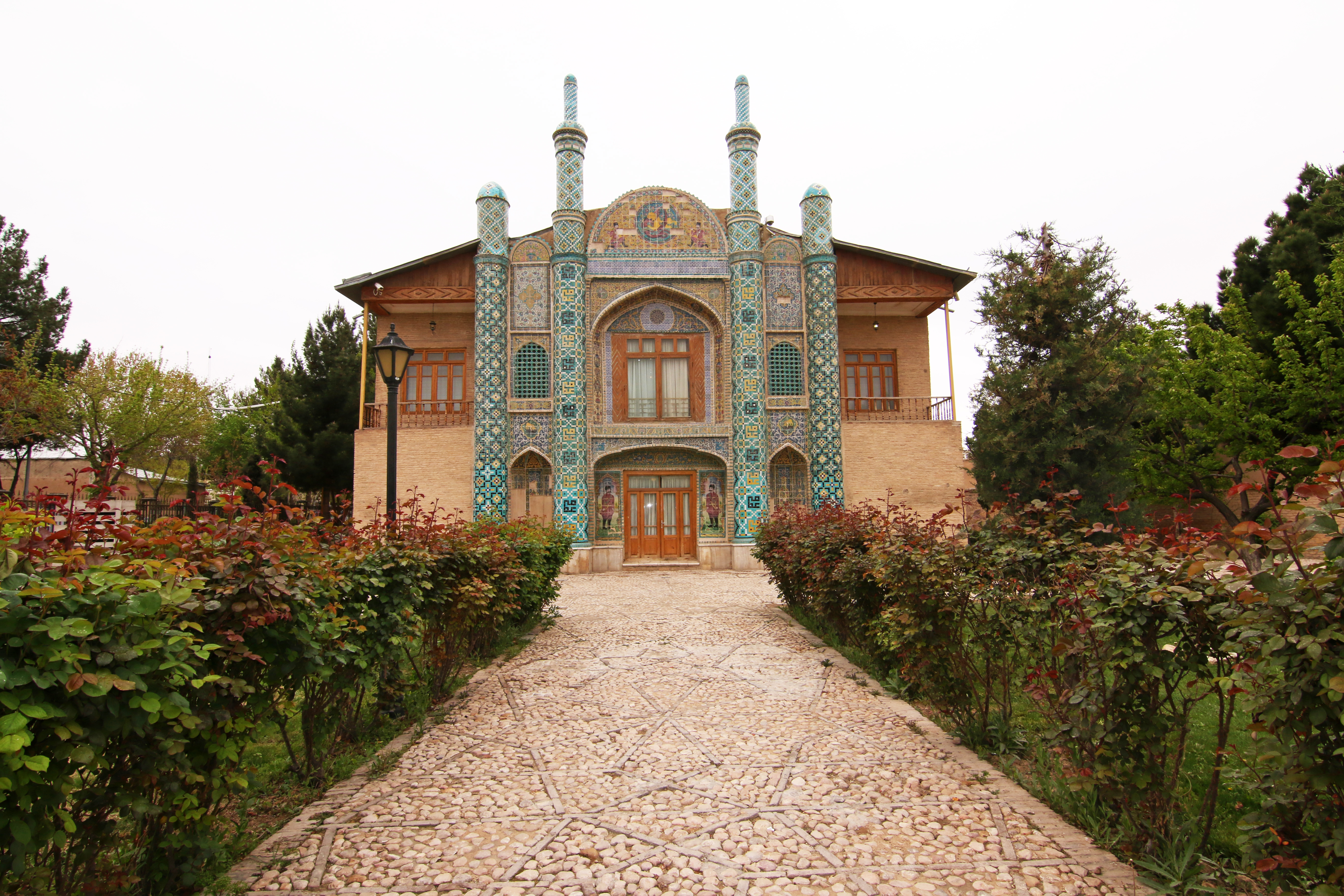
Exterior view

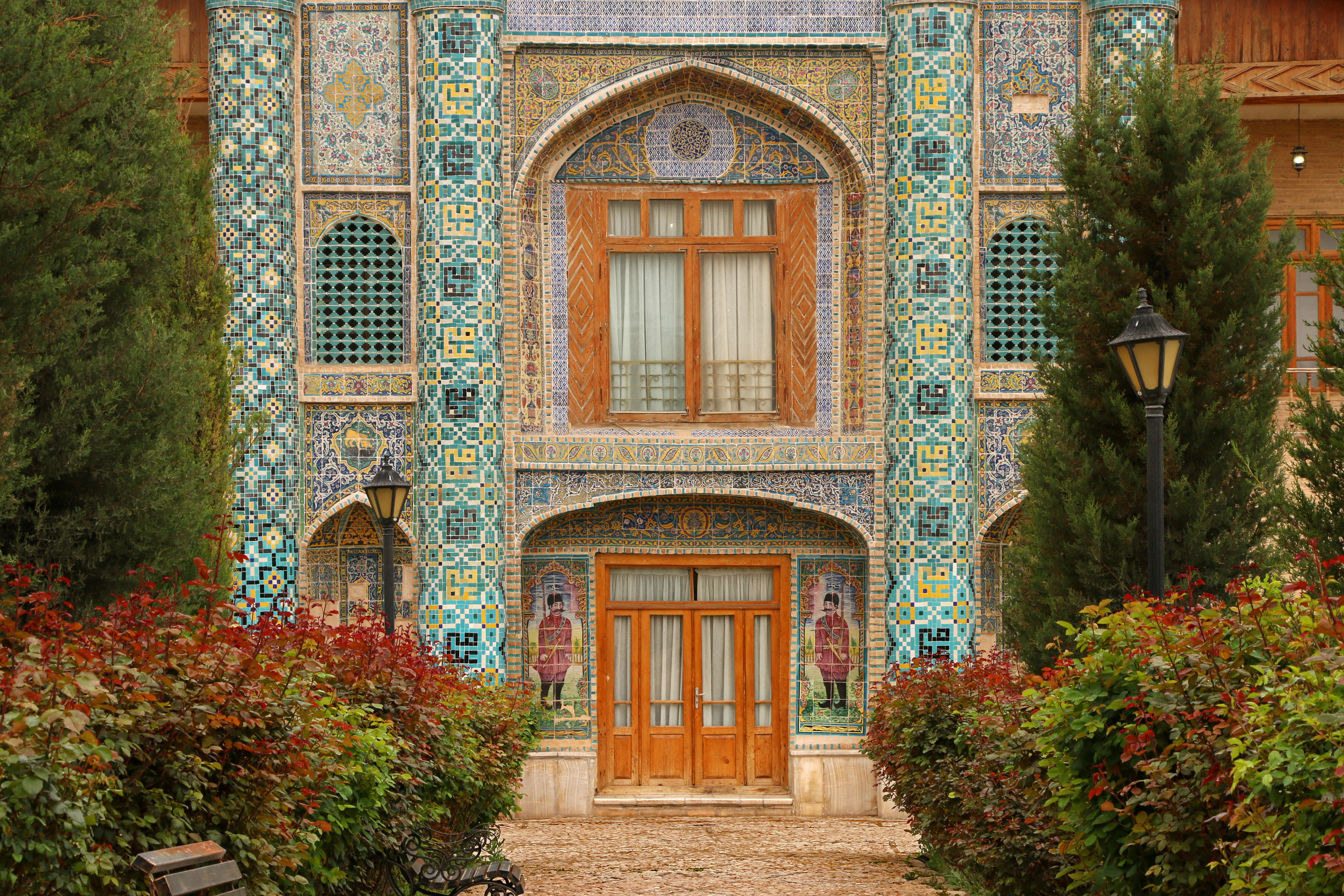
Main view

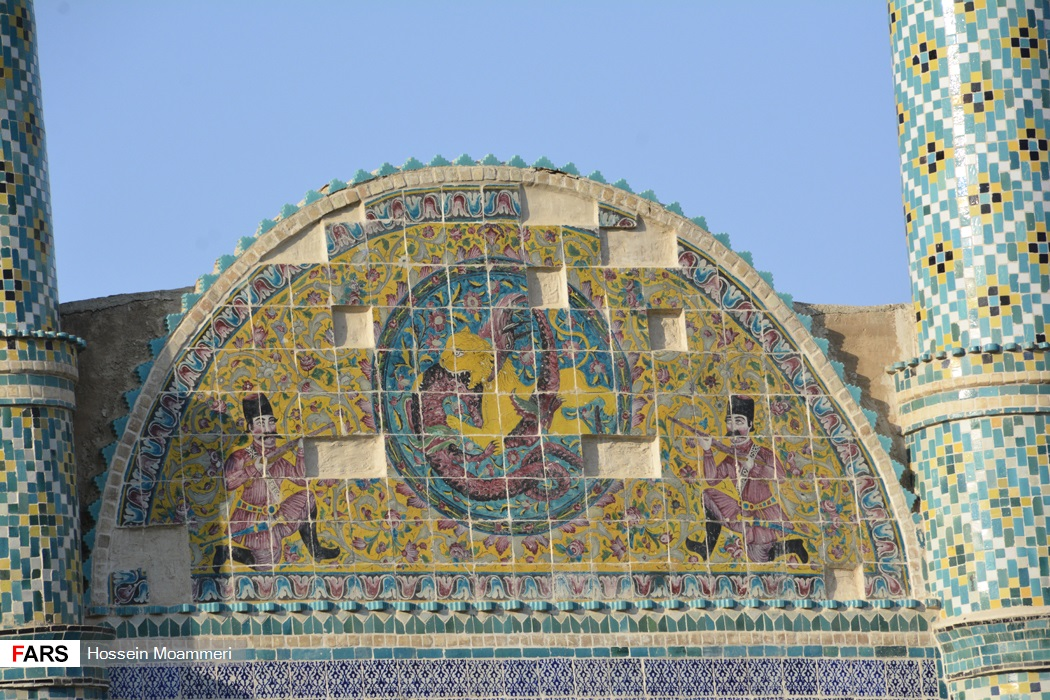
Tiling of lion and dragon battle

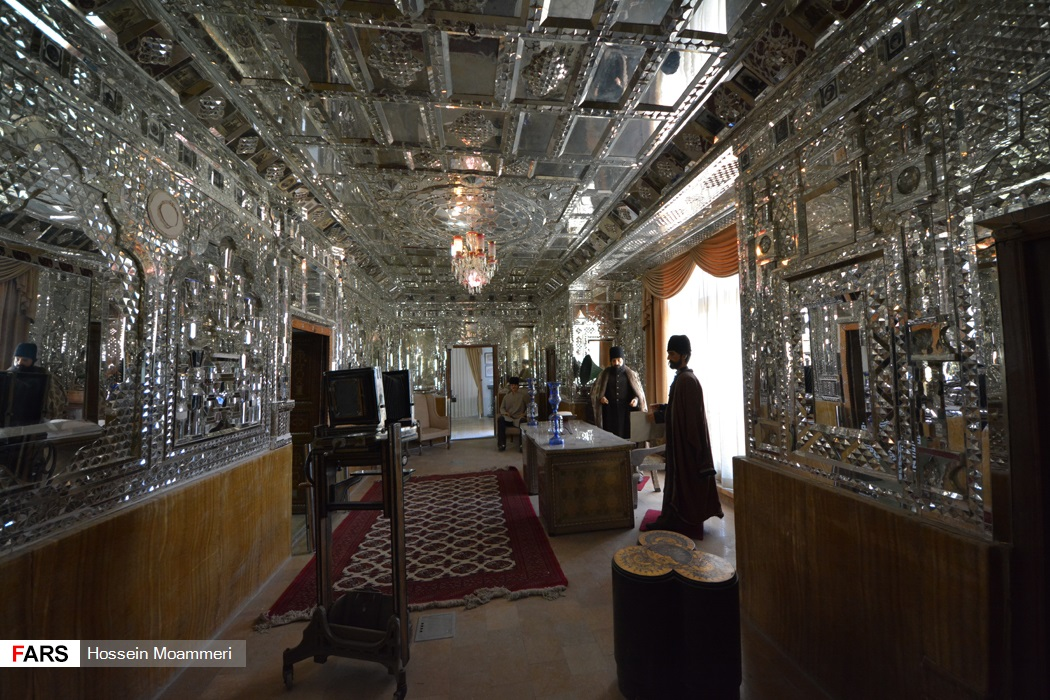
Mirror House featuring ayeneh-kari

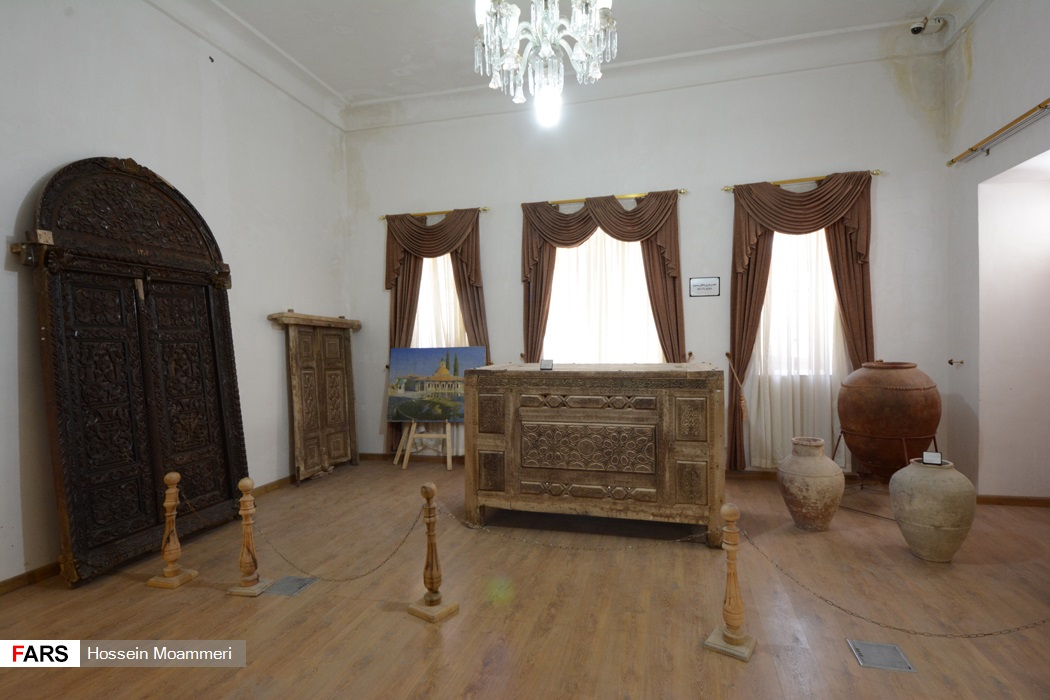
Inside view

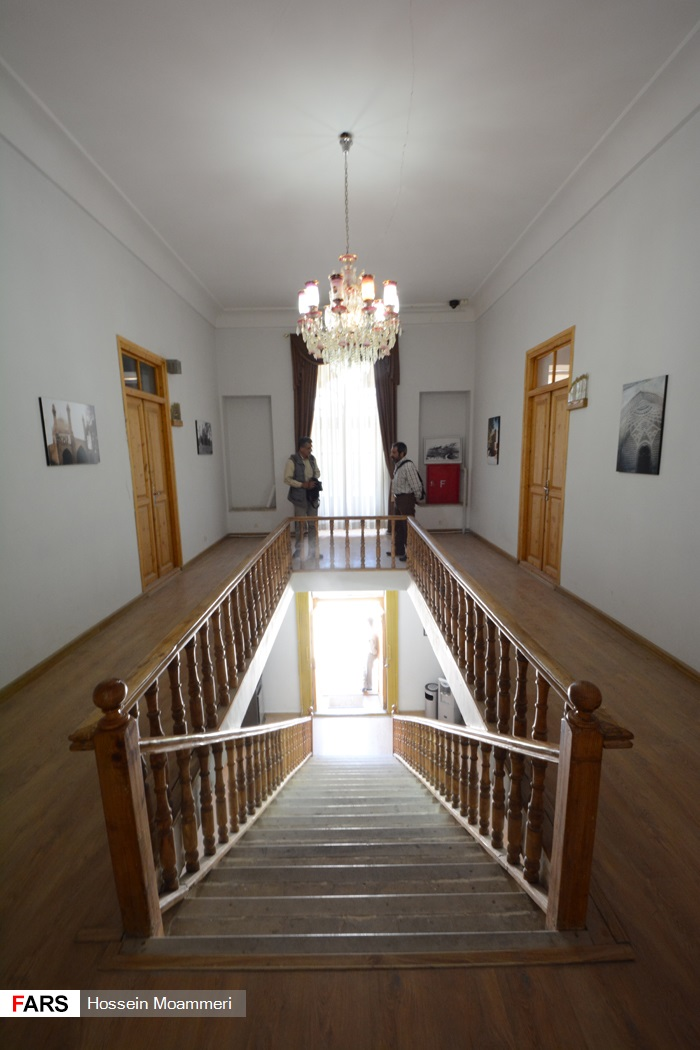
Inside view

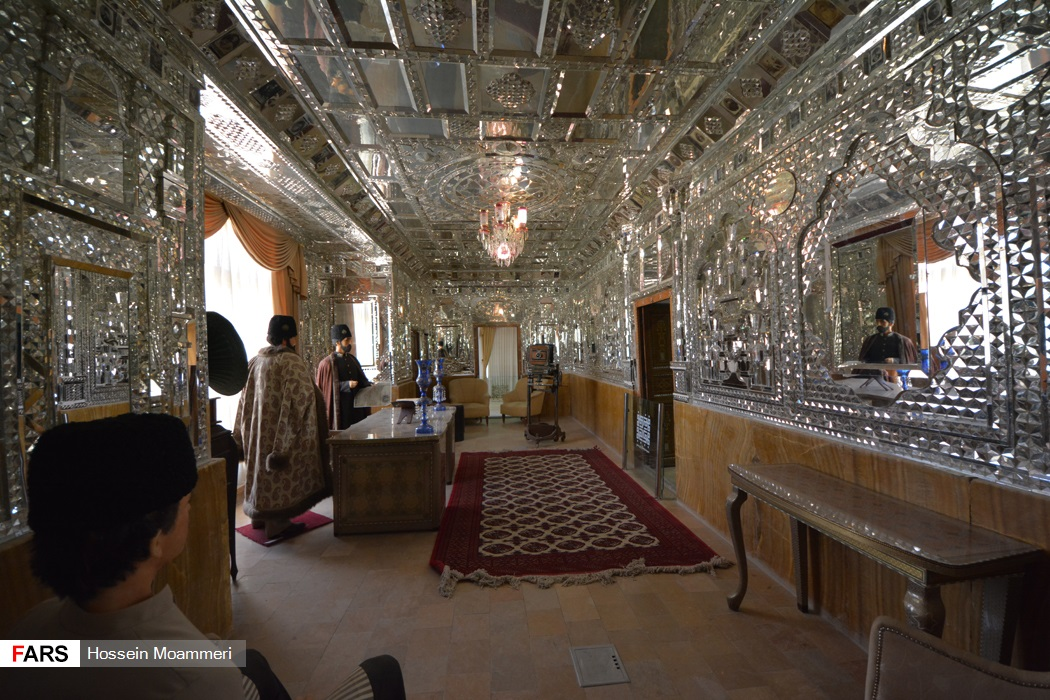
Mirror House
