= Glass mosaic =

Traditional Burmese decorative glasswork

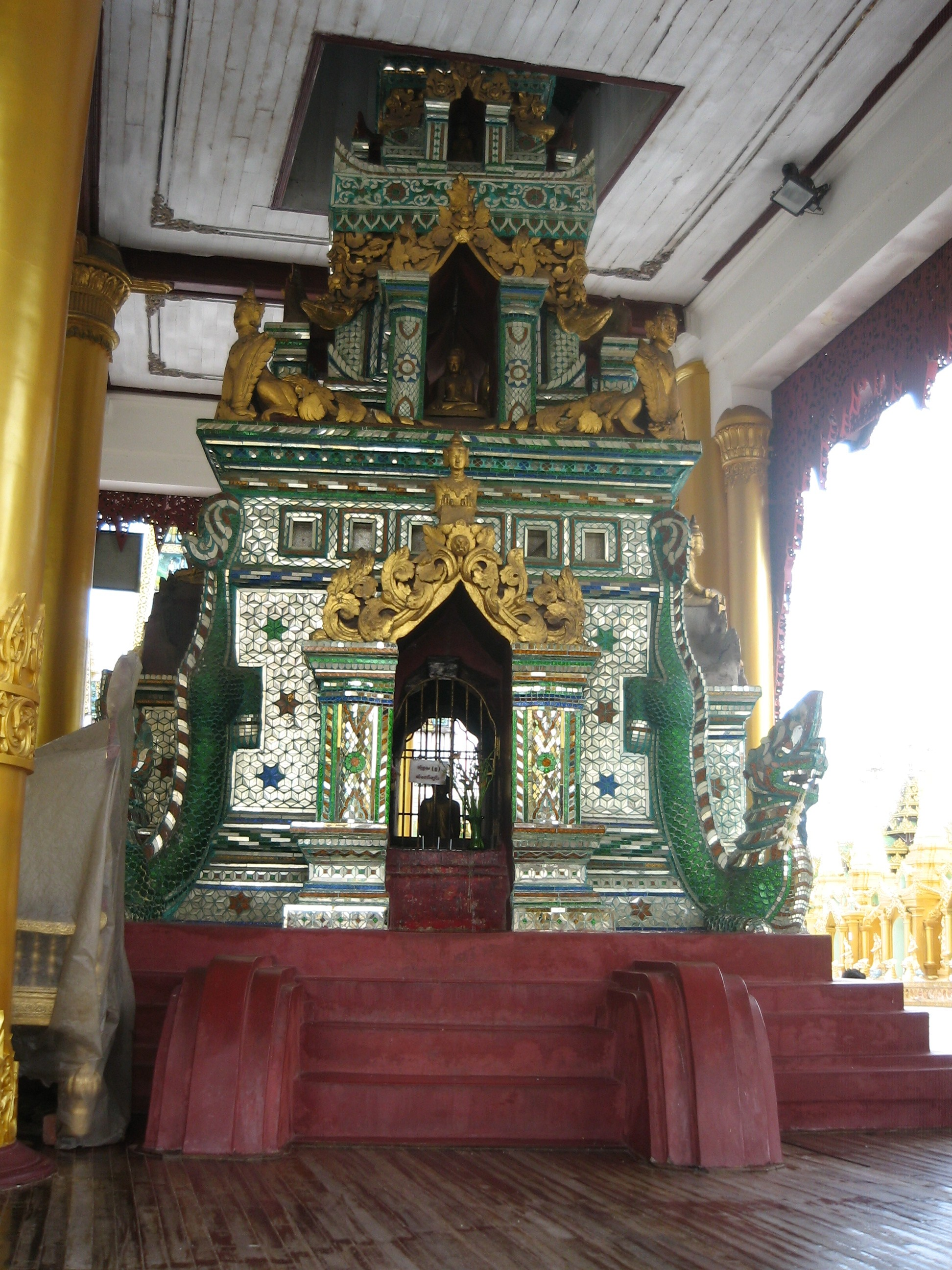
A well in Shwedagon Pagoda is embellished with glass mosaic.

In Myanmar culture, glass mosaic (Burmese: မှန်စီရွှေချ) is a traditional form of glasswork where pieces of glass are used to embellish decorative art, structures, and furniture. Glass mosaic is typically divided into two subcategories, hman gyan si (မှန်ကြမ်းစီ) and hman nu si (မှန်နုစီ). The former is typically used to decorate the walls and ceilings of pagodas, while the latter is used to embellish furniture and accessories. The art form originated in the 1500s during the Nyaungyan era. Glass mosaic is often studded with gems and semi-precious stones.

== History ==
Glass mosaic is a traditional Burmese mosaic made with pieces of glass, used to embellish decorative art, structures, and furniture. Glass mosaic is typically divided into two subcategories, hman gyan si (မှန်ကြမ်းစီ) and hman nu si (မှန်နုစီ). The former is typically used to decorate the walls and ceilings of pagodas, while the latter is used to embellish furniture and accessories. The art form originated in the 1500s during the Nyaungyan era. Glass mosaic is often studded with gems and semi-precious stones.

The National Museum of Myanmar exhibits hundreds of glass mosaic pieces like dolls, animal figures, chairs.

== Notable artists ==
- Isaiah Zagar
- Boris Anrep
- Miksa Róth

== Materials ==
- Glass
- Gems
- Glue
- Grout
- Sponge

== See also ==
- Mosaic
- Art of Myanmar
- Tiffany Glass and Decorating Company
- Ayeneh-kari, a similar element in Persian architecture
