= Barrel vault =

Architectural element formed by the extrusion of a single curve

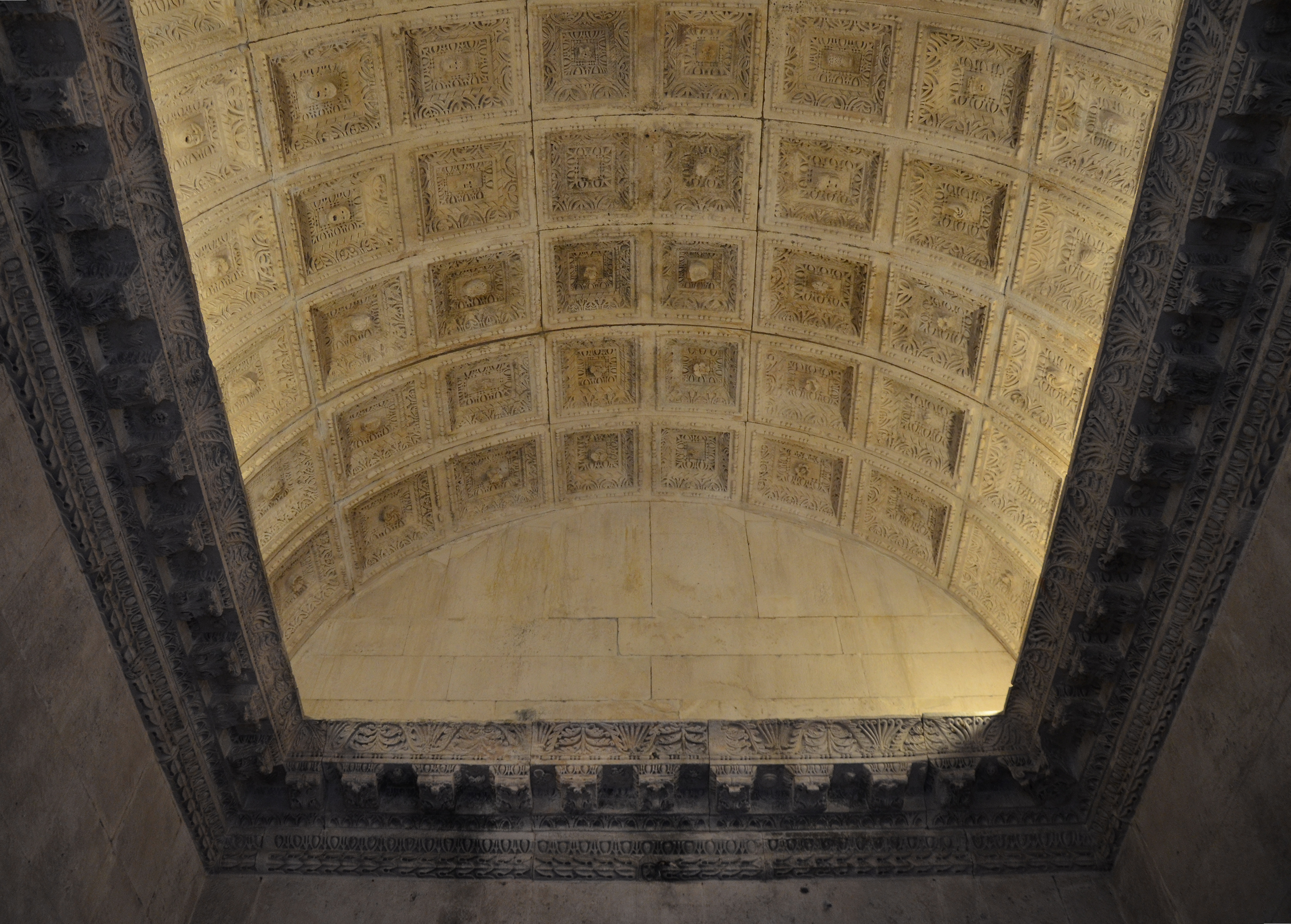
Coffered ceiling of the barrel-vaulted nave in the Temple of Jupiter at Diocletian's Palace in Split, Croatia. Built early 4th century.

Nave of Lisbon Cathedral with a barrel-vaulted soffit, no clerestory windows and a rose window at one end

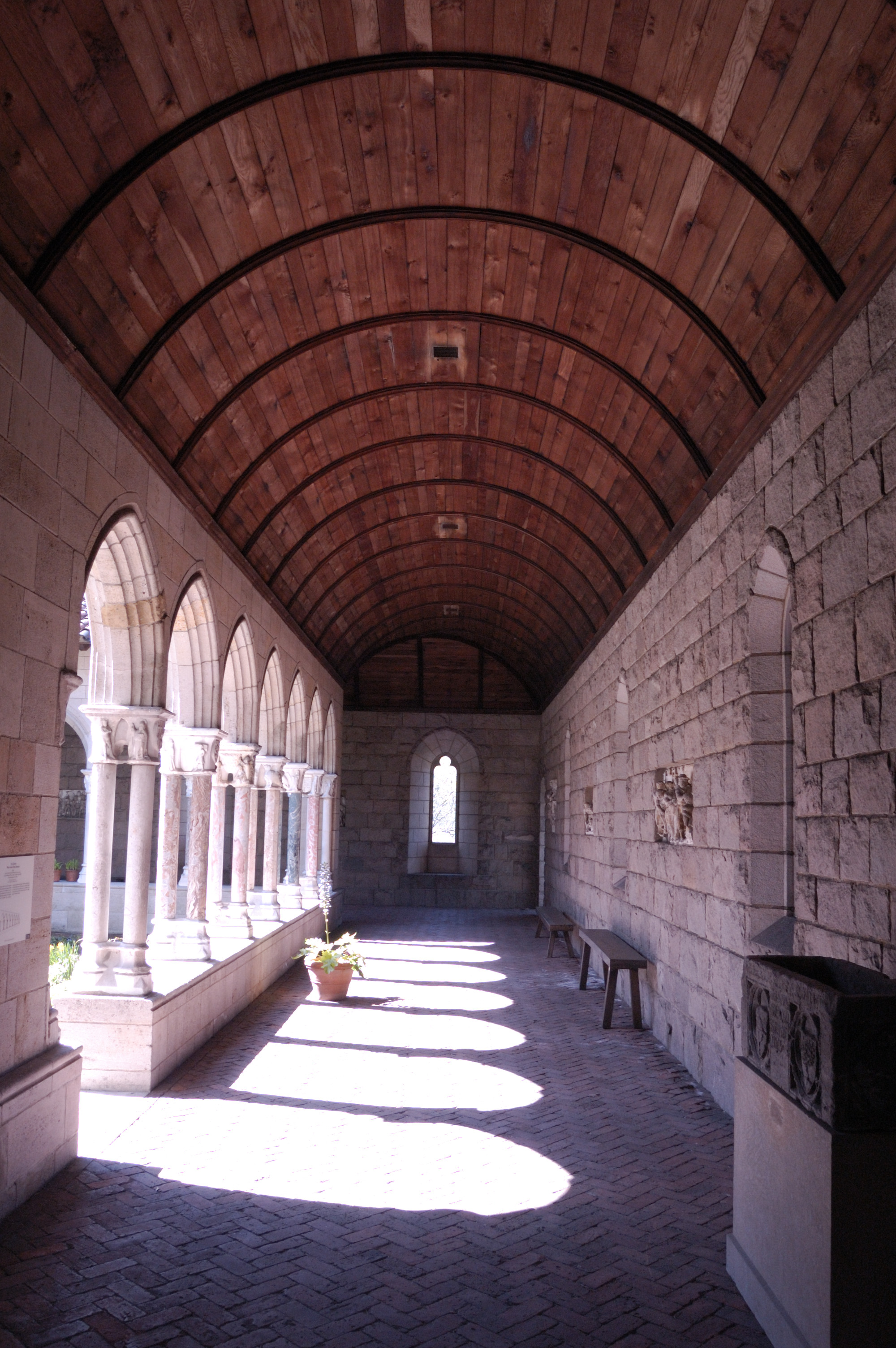
The Cloisters, New York City

A barrel vault, also known as a tunnel vault, wagon vault or wagonhead vault, is an architectural element formed by the extrusion of a single curve (or pair of curves, in the case of a pointed barrel vault) along a given distance. The curves are typically circular in shape, lending a semi-cylindrical appearance to the total design. The barrel vault is the simplest form of a vault: effectively a series of arches placed side by side (i.e., one after another). It is a form of barrel roof.

As with all arch-based constructions, there is an outward thrust generated against the walls underneath a barrel vault. There are several mechanisms for absorbing this thrust. One is to make the walls exceedingly thick and strong – this is a primitive and sometimes unacceptable method. A more elegant method is to build two or more vaults parallel to each other; the forces of their outward thrusts will thus negate each other. This method was most often used in construction of churches, where several vaulted naves ran parallel down the length of the building. However, the outer walls of the outermost vault would still have to be quite strong or reinforced by buttressing. The third and most elegant mechanism to resist the lateral thrust was to create an intersection of two barrel vaults at right angles, thus forming a groin vault.

Barrel vaults are known from the Ancient Iran (Elam), Indian Indus Valley Civilization and Ancient Egypt, and were used extensively in Roman architecture. They were also used to replace the Cloaca Maxima with a system of underground sewers. Other early barrel vault designs occur in northern Europe, Turkey, Morocco, and other regions. In medieval Europe, the barrel vault was an important element of stone construction in monasteries, castles, tower houses and other structures. This form of design is observed in cellars, crypts, long hallways, cloisters and even great halls.

== Theory and early history ==
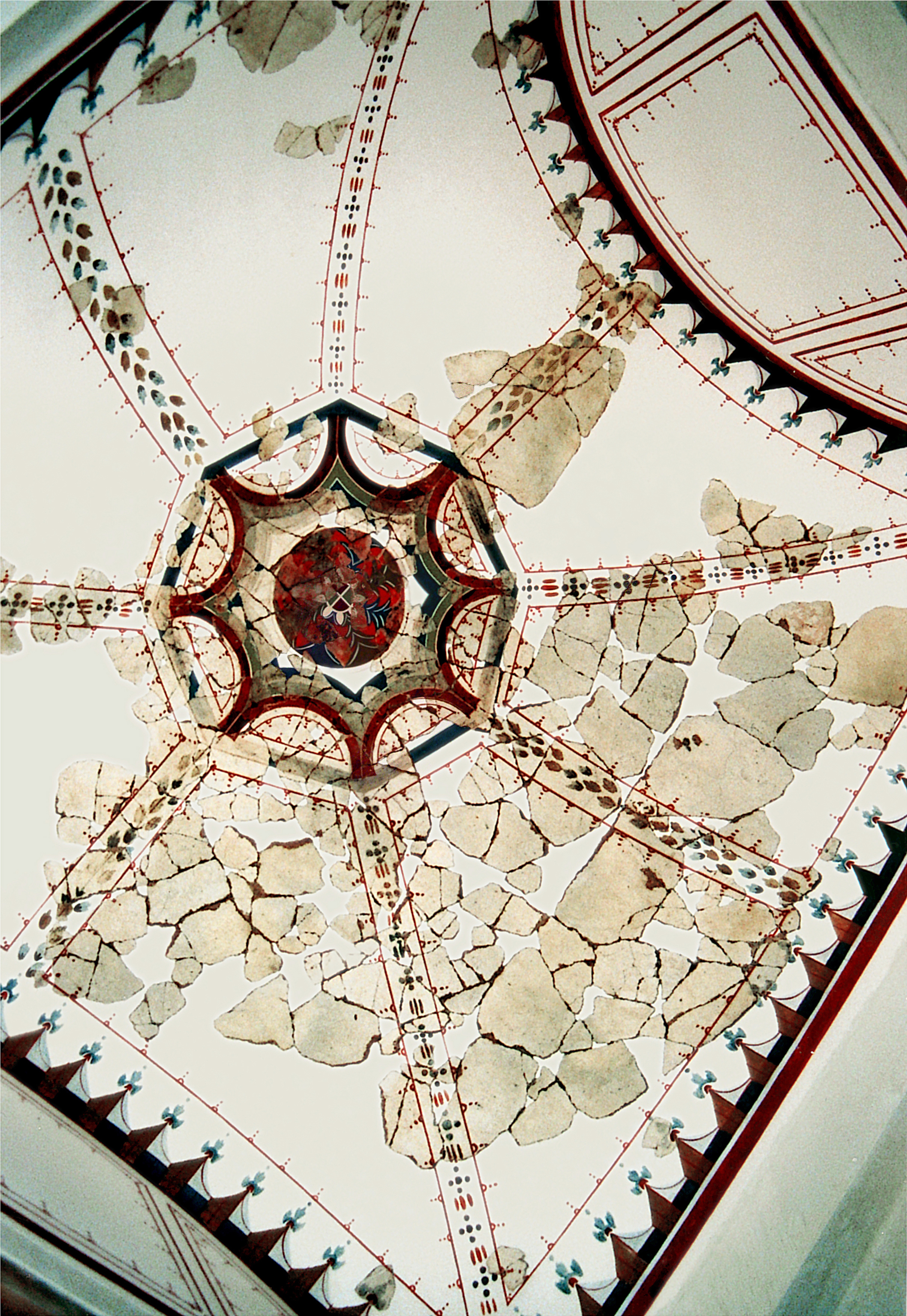
Roman barrel vault at the villa rustica Bad Neuenahr-Ahrweiler, Germany.

Barrel vaulting was known and utilized by early civilizations, including ancient Egypt and Mesopotamia. However, it apparently was not a very popular or common method of construction within these civilizations. The Persians and the Romans were the first to make significant architectural use of them. The technique probably evolved out of necessity to roof buildings with masonry elements such as bricks or stone blocks in areas where timber and wood were scarce. The earliest known example of a vault is a tunnel vault found under the Sumerian ziggurat at Nippur in Babylonia, ascribed to about 4000 BC, which was built from fired bricks amalgamated with clay mortar. The earliest tunnel vaults in Egypt are found at Requagnah and Denderah, from around 3500 BC in the predynastic era. These were built with sun-dried brick in three rings over passages descending to tombs with a span of only two metres. In these early instances, the barrel vault was chiefly used for underground structures such as drains and sewers, though several buildings of the great Late Egyptian mortuary palace-temple of Ramesseum were also vaulted in this way. Recent archaeological evidence discovered at the Morgantina site (in the province of Enna) shows that the aboveground barrel vault was known and used in Hellenistic Sicily in 3rd century BC, indicating that the technique was also known to ancient Greeks.

The vaulted roof of an early Harappan burial chamber has been noted from Rakhigarhi. S.R Rao reports vaulted roof of a small chamber in a house from Lothal. Barrel vaults were also used in the Late Harappan Cemetery H culture dated 1900 BC-1300 BC which formed the roof of the metal working furnace, the discovery was made by Vats in 1940 during excavation at Harappa.

Ancient Romans most probably inherited their knowledge of barrel vaulting from Etruscans and the Near East. Persians and Romans were the first to use this building method extensively on large-scale projects and were probably the first to use scaffolding to aid them in construction of vaults spanning over widths greater than anything seen before. However, Roman builders gradually began to prefer the use of groin vault; though more complex to erect, this type of vault did not require heavy, thick walls for support (see below), and thus allowed for more spacious buildings with greater openings and much more light inside, such as thermae.

After the fall of the Roman Empire, few buildings large enough to require much in the way of vaulting were built for several centuries. In the early Romanesque period, a return to stone barrel vaults was seen for the first great cathedrals; their interiors were fairly dark, due to thick, heavy walls needed to support the vault. One of the largest and most famous churches enclosed from above by a vast barrel vault was the church of Cluny Abbey, built between the 11th and 12th centuries.

In 13th and 14th centuries, with the advance of the new Gothic style, barrel vaulting became almost extinct in constructions of great Gothic cathedrals; groin vaults reinforced by stone ribs were mostly used in the beginning, and later on various types of spectacular, ornate and complex medieval vaults were developed. However, with the coming of the Renaissance and the Baroque style, and revived interest in art and architecture of antiquity, barrel vaulting was re-introduced on a truly grandiose scale, and employed in the construction of many famous buildings and churches, such as Basilica di Sant'Andrea di Mantova by Leone Battista Alberti, San Giorgio Maggiore by Andrea Palladio, and perhaps most glorious of all, St. Peter's Basilica in Rome, where a huge barrel vault spans the 27 m (89 ft)-wide nave.

== Engineering issues ==
With a barrel vault design the vectors of pressure result in a downward force on the crown while the lower portions of the arches realise a lateral force pushing outwards. As an outcome this form of design is subject to failure unless the sides are anchored or buttressed to very heavy building elements or substantial earthwork sidings. For example, at Muchalls Castle in Scotland, adjacent walls to the barrel vaulted chambers are up to 4.6 m (15 ft) thick, adding the buttressing strength needed to secure the curved design.

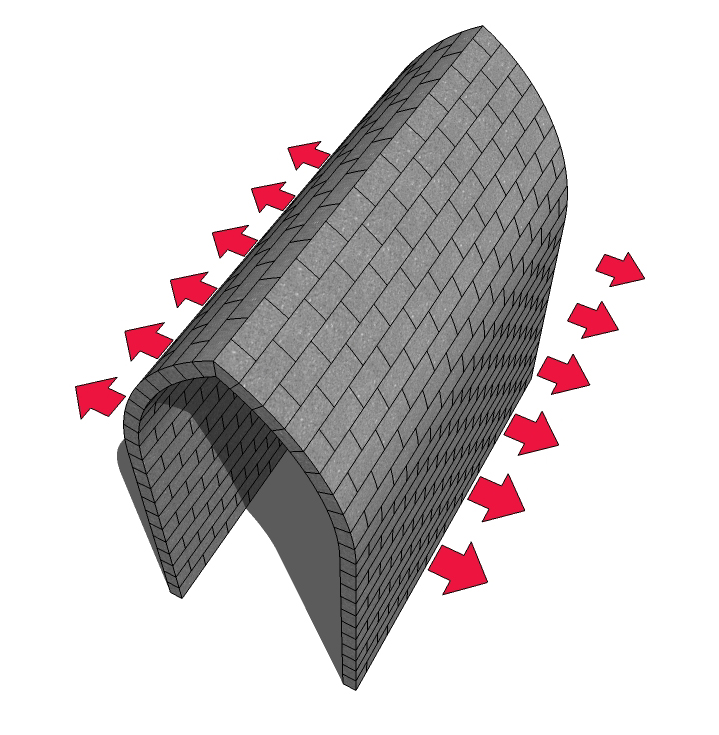
Pointed barrel vault showing direction of lateral forces.

The inherent difficulty of adequately lighting barrel vaulted structures has been widely acknowledged. The intrinsic engineering issue is the need to avoid fenestration punctures in stonework barrel vaults. Such openings could compromise the integrity of the entire arch system. Thus the Romanesque medieval builders had to resort to techniques of small windows, large buttresses, or other forms of interior wall cross-bracing to achieve the desired lighting outcomes. In many of the monasteries, a natural solution was cloisters which could have high barrel-vaulted construction with an open courtyard to allow ample lighting.

Since 1996 structural engineers have applied Newtonian mechanics to calculate numeric stress loads for ancient stonework barrel vaults. These analyses have typically used a finite element algorithm to calculate gravity induced stresses from the self weight of an arched system. In fact, for structural engineers, analysis of the barrel vault has become a benchmark test of a structural engineering computer model "because of the complex membrane and inextensional bending states of stress" involved.

In terms of comparison to other vaulting techniques, the barrel vault is inherently a weaker design compared to the more complex groin vault. The barrel vault structure must rest on long walls creating less stable lateral stress, whereas the groin vault design can direct stresses almost purely vertically on the apexes.

== Early occurrences ==
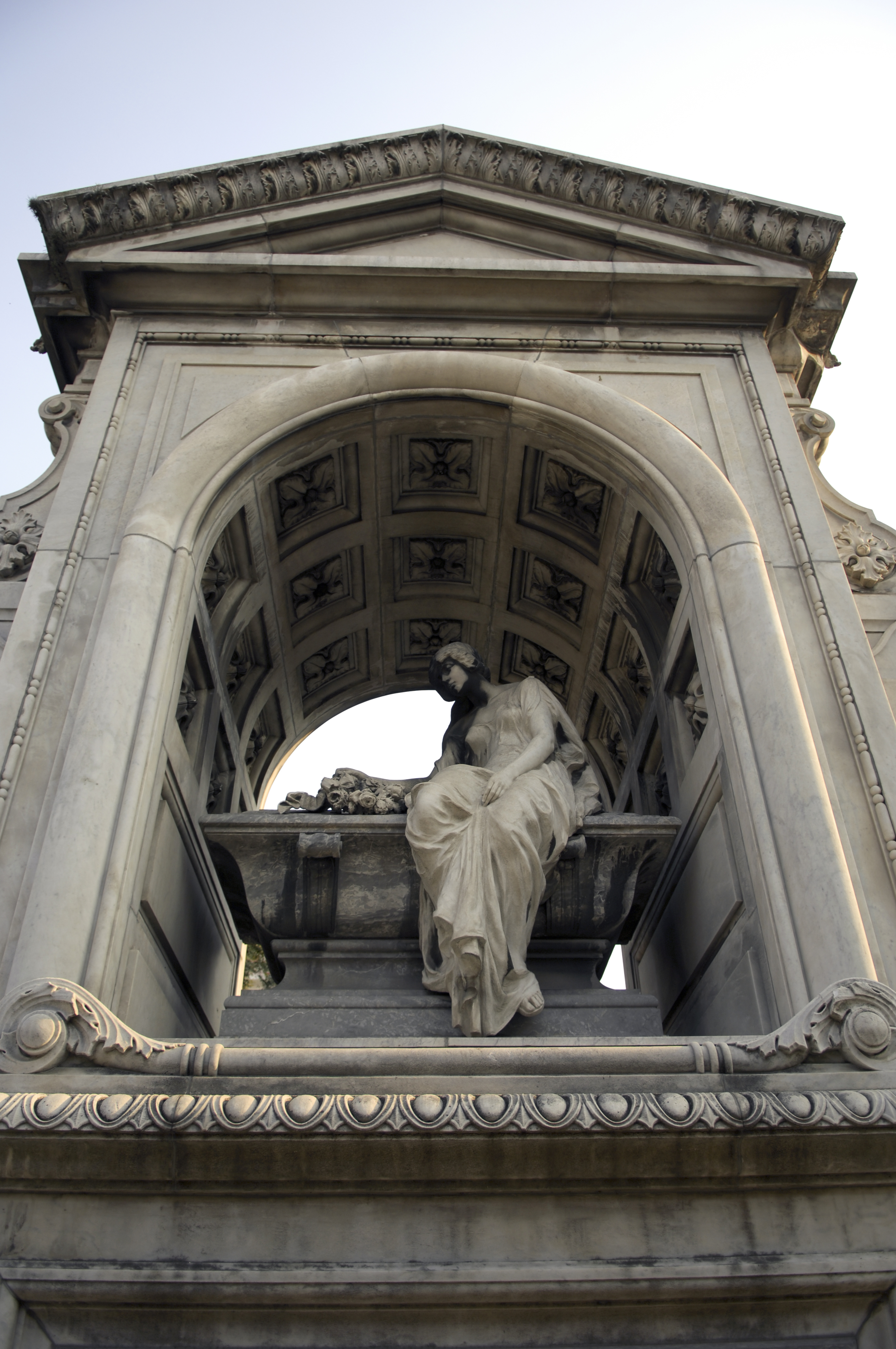
Barrel vault in a mausoleum at the Recoleta Cemetery, Buenos Aires, Argentina

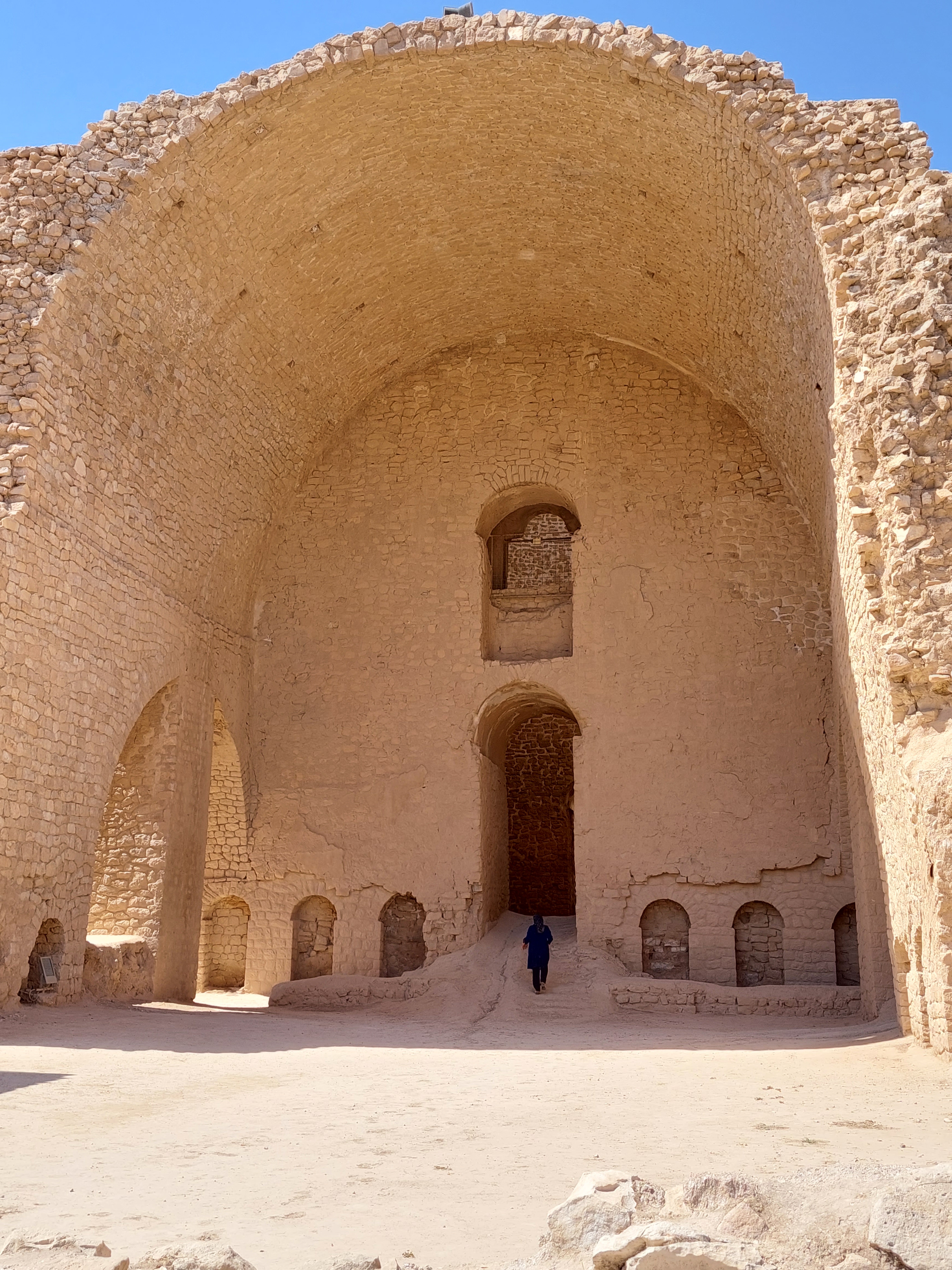
The great archway of the entrance to the palace of Ardeshir I

- Palace of Ardeshir, Iran, Fars province
- Qal'eh Dokhtar, Iran, Firuzabad, Fars
- Sarvestan Palace, Iran, Sarvestan
- Bishapur, Iran, Kazerun, most notably at the Temple of Anahita
- Beverston Castle, England, undercroft below south tower of west range
- Cathedral of Cortona, Tuscany
- Dunnottar Castle, Scotland, Whigs Vault
- Hadrian's Villa, Tivoli, Italy, numerous occurrences at this early 2nd century AD site
- Mausoleum of Galla Placidia, Ravenna, Italy (c. 500 AD)
- Muchalls Castle, Scotland, crypt and long hall
- Myres Castle, Scotland, cellars
- Real Monasterio de Nuestra Senora de Rueda, Spain, cloisters of this 12th-century monastery
- Scrovegni Chapel also known as Cappella degli Scrovegni, Padua, Veneto, Italy (1303 AD)
- Vatican grotto, Vatican City

== Modern examples ==
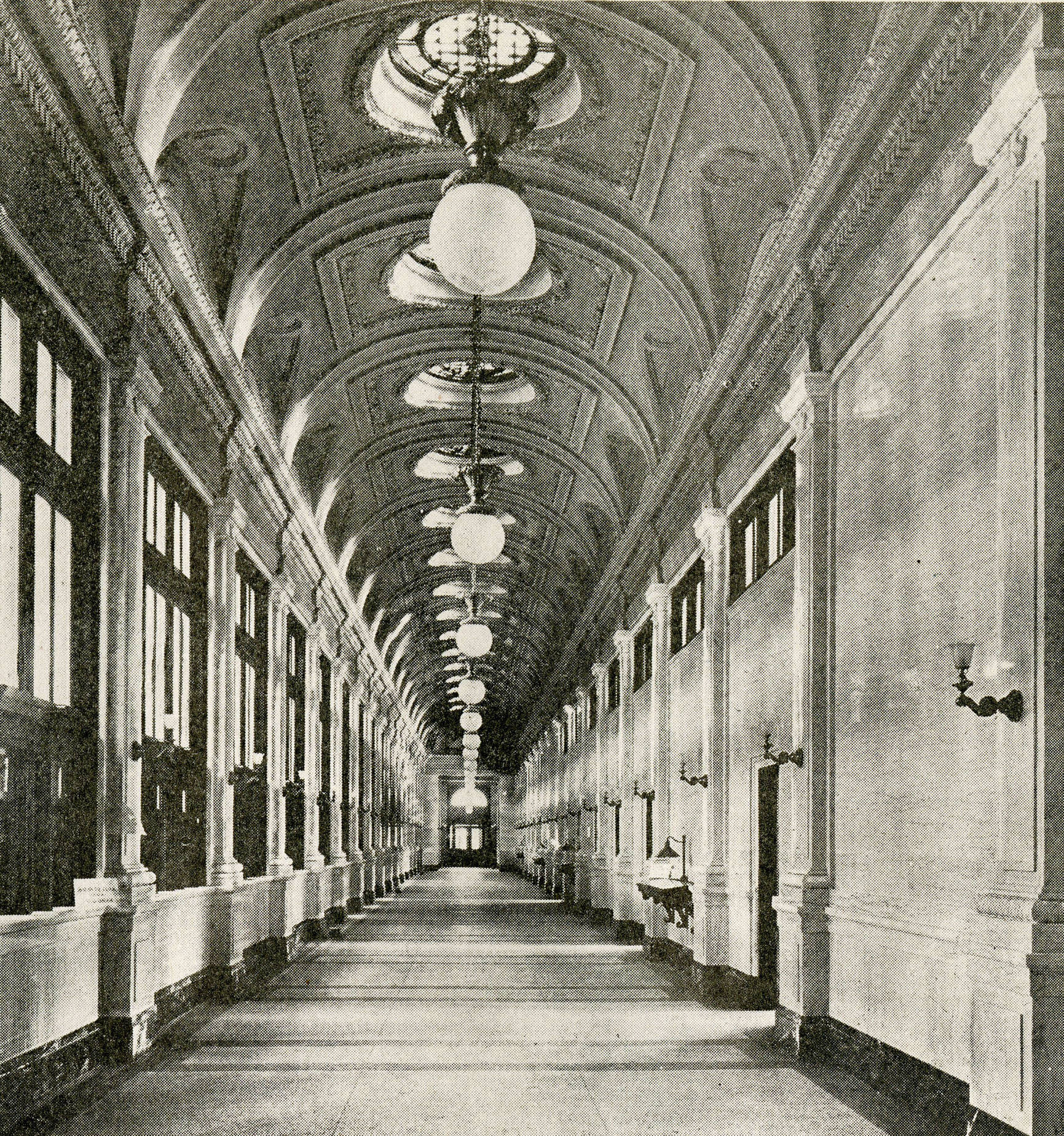
Barrel vault in the early 20th century main post office of Toledo, Ohio

There are numerous contemporary examples of barrel vault design in Victorian and modern architecture, including:

- Sistine Chapel, Vatican City
- Royal Granary, Meknes, Morocco (17th century)
- Williamson Tunnels, Liverpool, England (early 19th century)
- Belfast, Northern Ireland, City Hall Banquet room with barrel vault ceiling 1896–1906, Donegal Square
- Huntington Bank Building, Cleveland, Ohio, 1924 design
- Kimbell Art Museum, Fort Worth, Texas, United States, spanning a width of 174 feet.
- Melbourne, Australia, Forest Hill Chase Shopping Centre, made of polycarbonate
- The Indiana University new library
- Fremont Street Experience, Las Vegas

== In unconventional usage ==
Beyond the classical use of the barrel vault in macro-architectural design (e.g. as a major structural roofing element), there are a variety of derivative applications clearly based on the original concept and shape of the barrel vault. These applications arise in the fields of surgery, skylight design, children's toys and microstructure design (such as bus shelters). While none of these applications rival the majesty of the ancient and Classical predecessors, they demonstrate the pervasiveness of the barrel vault as an architectural concept in contemporary times.

In the field of bone surgery the technique of a "barrel vault" shaped incision is not only a well-defined state-of-the-art surgical procedure, but the name barrel vault is given to this technique by orthopedic surgeons. The Wohlfahrt study cited documents results of this surgical procedure on the human tibia in 91 such operations.

== See also ==
- List of architectural vaults
- Chandrashala
- Keystone
- Romanesque architecture
- Chartaq
