= Sassanid Archaeological Landscape of Fars Region =

UNESCO World Heritage Site
- Interactive map of Sassanid Archaeological Landscape of Fars Region
- Location: Iran
- Criteria: Cultural: (ii), (iii), (v)
- Reference: 1568
- Inscription: 2018 (42nd Session)
- Area: 639.3 ha (1,580 acres)
- Buffer zone: 12,715 ha (31,420 acres)
- Coordinates: 29°46′39″N 51°34′14″E

Sassanid Archaeological Landscape of Fars Region (Persian: چشم‌انداز باستان‌شناسی ساسانی منطقه فارس) is the official denomination given by UNESCO to eight Sasanian archaeological sites situated in the southeast of Fars province, Iran. It was recognized on 30 June 2018 as a UNESCO World Heritage Site.

== Sites ==
Site	Image	Location
Qal'eh Dokhtar		Firuzabad; 28°55′15″N 52°31′48″E
Ardashir Investiture Relief		Firuzabad; 28°55′00″N 52°32′15″E
Victory Relief of Ardashir		Firuzabad; 28°54′36″N 52°32′27″E
Ardashir Khurreh		Firuzabad; 28°51′08″N 52°31′57″E
Palace of Ardashir		Firuzabad; 28°53′53″N 52°32′21″E
City of Bishapur		Bishapur; 29°46′39″N 51°34′14″E
Shapur cave		Bishapur; 29°48′25″N 51°36′47″E
Sarvestan Palace		Sarvestan; 29°11′44″N 53°13′52″E
