= Sasanian archaeology =

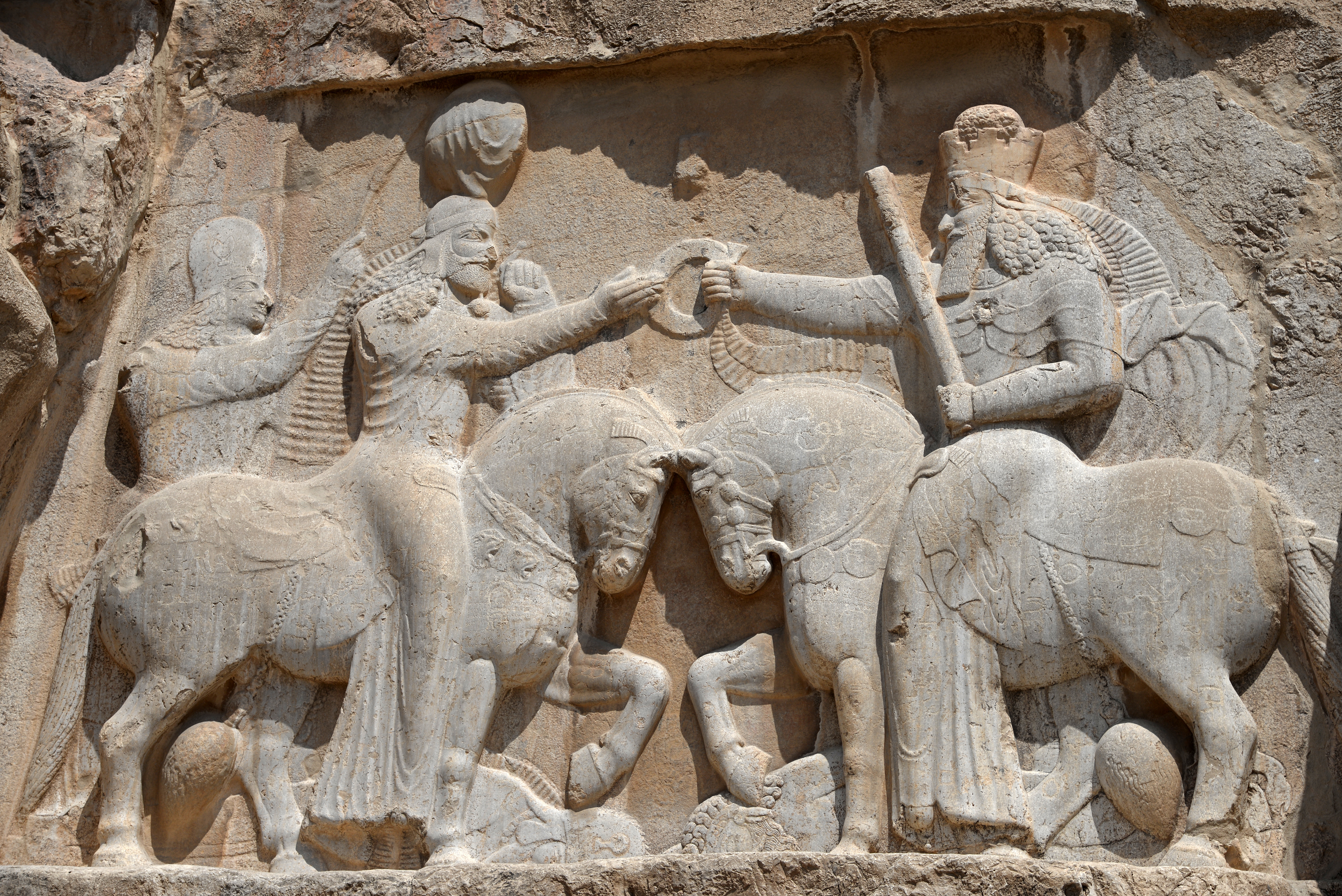
A photo of the Ardashir Investiture Relief in 2018, depicting the coronation ceremoney of Ardashir I, where Ardashir is handed the right of kingship by the supreme god Ahura Mazda. The relief is 6.65m wide and 2.40m high.

Sasanian archaeology is a branch of archaeology that focuses on the excavation and study of artifacts and material culture of the Sasanian Empire. The Sasanian Empire was the last Persian empire of Late Antiquity, succeeding the Parthians to rule over the geographic region centered in Iran, but also including large parts of the Eastern Mediterranean, West Asia, and Central Asia, and more sporadically parts of the Arabian Peninsula, from 224 CE to 651 CE. Compared to literary sources, archaeology has played a small, but growing role in understanding the history of this time, place, and state. Archaeology has helped understand Iranian architecture and the daily lives of the inhabitants of the empire, as well as trends of agricultural intensification, economic intensification, border defense, urbanization, religious identity and plurality, and the impact of Sasanian culture on its surrounding societies.

There are eight Sasanian archaeological sites considered UNESCO World Heritage Sites, all in the Sassanid Archaeological Landscape of Fars Region, or the southeastern part of the Fars province, across three cities (Sarvestan, Bishapur and Firuzabad), in Iran. These include the Qal'eh Dokhtar castle, the Ardashir Investiture Relief, The Victory Relief of Ardashir, the site of Ardashir-Khwarrah, the Palace of Ardashir, the entire city of Bishapur and its related components, the Shapur Cave, and finally, the Sarvestan Palace.

== By region ==
=== Northeastern and eastern Iran ===
Archaeological work in northeastern and eastern Iran has highlighted the strategic and ideological importance of the eastern frontiers of the empire, particularly in response to nomadic incursions from Central Asia. The most significant discovery is the monumental Bandian complex near Dargaz in northern Khorasan, excavated between 1994 and 1999, which revealed a large pisé-built structure including a columned hall, fire temple, ossuary, and extensive stucco reliefs depicting royal victories, religious iconography, and historical events associated with Sasanian conflicts against the Hephtalites. These reliefs, accompanied by Middle Persian inscriptions naming high-ranking officials, provide rare archaeological corroboration of Sasanian political propaganda and frontier warfare. Other discoveries in the region include fire temples at Mele Hairam and Kaka, the recovery of bronze objects at Tuzandejan, and extensive investigation of the Great Wall of Gorgan, a massive linear fortification system dated by radiocarbon analysis to the fifth century and associated with the reign of Peroz I. These sites highlight the effort placed by the empire in controlling their frontiers and in their religious expressions.

=== Southeastern Iran ===
Archaeological research in southeastern Iran has been dominated by investigations at Kuh-e Khajeh in Sistan, one of the largest and most important mudbrick monumental complexes in Iran. Situated on an isolated volcanic hill within the Hamun Lake, the site was initially explored in the early twentieth century and later excavated more systematically between 1990 and 1992 as part of conservation efforts. These excavations clarified the architectural layout of the complex, which includes monumental gates, courtyards, eyvans, vaulted halls, and painted galleries decorated with wall paintings and stucco. Stratigraphic evidence and radiocarbon dating confirm at least two major construction phases, beginning in the late Parthian or early Sasanian period and continuing into the late Sasanian era. Kuh-e Khajeh emerges from the archaeology as a major and sophisticated site with ceremonial importance for the self-expression of the empire, and it underscores the longevity of Sasanian occupation in the southeast.

=== Northwestern and western Iran ===
Archaeological activity in northwestern and western Iran during the past decades has focused primarily on fortified sites and religious architecture, often through rescue excavations prompted by development projects. At Takht-e Soleymān, limited excavations have yielded seal impressions and bullae, though full publication remains pending. More extensive work has been conducted at Qaleh Zahak near Mianeh, a large mountain fortress excavated between 2000 and 2004, which revealed a baked-brick chahar-taq pavilion, columned halls, stucco decoration, and wall paintings dating to the late Parthian or early Sasanian period, with continued occupation into the Islamic era. In western Iran, rescue excavations at Shiyan near Kermanshah uncovered a substantial Sasanian fire temple complex with decorated altars, column bases, stucco ornamentation, and associated coinage spanning from the reign of Shapur I through the late Sasanian and early Islamic periods.

== History of scholarship ==
The early understanding of Sasanian history relied on literary reports, with the first excavations at a Sasanian site beginning in the 1920s, at the capital Ctesiphon. Excavations continued, but were interrupted by the Iran–Iraq War (1980–1988), which led to the suspension of all archaeological activities. Afterwards, it was in the 1990s where we began to see new projects and fieldwork open up. For example, in 1996, the Cultural Heritage Organization of Iran (CHO) launched a project in 1996 with the aim of studying early Islamic remains at Bishapur, which also came to inform the pre-Islamic Sasanian occupation. In 2005, a joint Irano-German team under the auspices of the CHO began in 2005, at Firuzabad.

== See also ==
- Archaeology of the Arabian Peninsula
- Classical archaeology
- Middle Persian literature
