= Shapur Cave =

UNESCO World Heritage Site in Iran

Shapur cave
UNESCO World Heritage Site
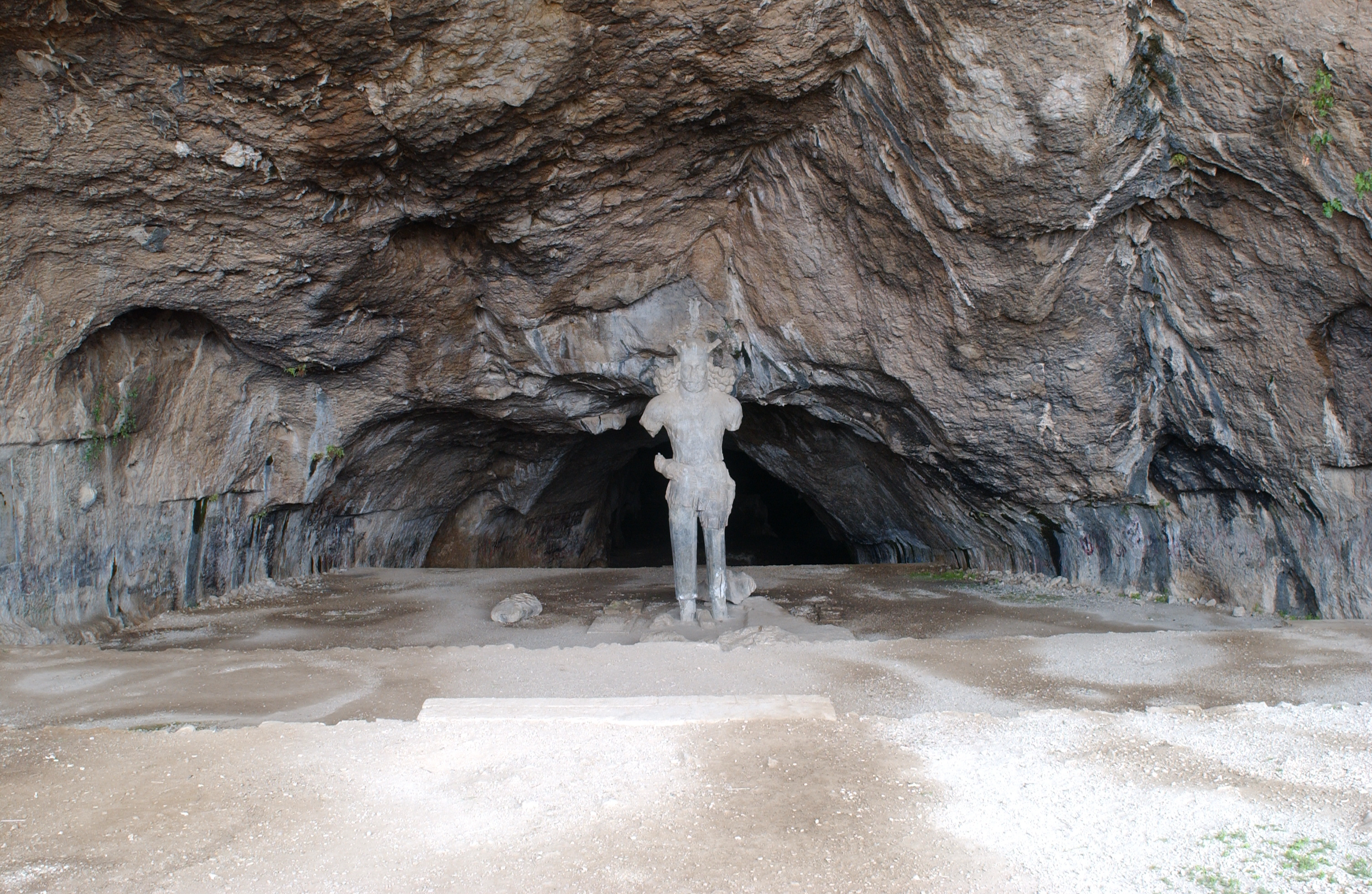

- Location within West and Central Asia Location within Iran
- Location: Fars province, Iran
- Criteria: Cultural: ii, iii
- Reference: 1222
- Inscription: 2018 (42nd Session)

Shapur Cave (Persian: غار شاپور) is located in the Zagros Mountains, in southern Iran. This cave is near Kazerun in the Chogan valley. The Shapur Cave is a major site in the field of Sasanian archaeology and it is one of the eight designated UNESCO World Heritage Sites of the Sassanid Archaeological Landscape of Fars Region.

In the cave, on the fourth of five terraces, stands the statue of Shapur I, the second ruler of the Sasanian Empire. The statue was carved from one stalagmite. The height of statue is 7 metres and its shoulders are 2 meters wide, and its arms are 3 meters long.

About 1400 years ago, after the Muslim conquest of Persia and collapse of the Sasanian Empire, the statue was pulled down and a part of one of its legs was broken. About 70 years ago, again, parts of his arms were also broken in an earthquake. The statue had been lying on the ground for about 14 centuries until 1957 when Mohammad Reza Pahlavi, the last Shah of Iran, had a group of Iranian military to raise it again on its feet and repair the broken foot with iron and cement.

There are two inscriptions in the cave, one translates Shapur's own inscription on the Naqsh-e Rajab. The other is about the restoration of the statue by the Imperial Iranian army under the Shah.

== Gallery ==
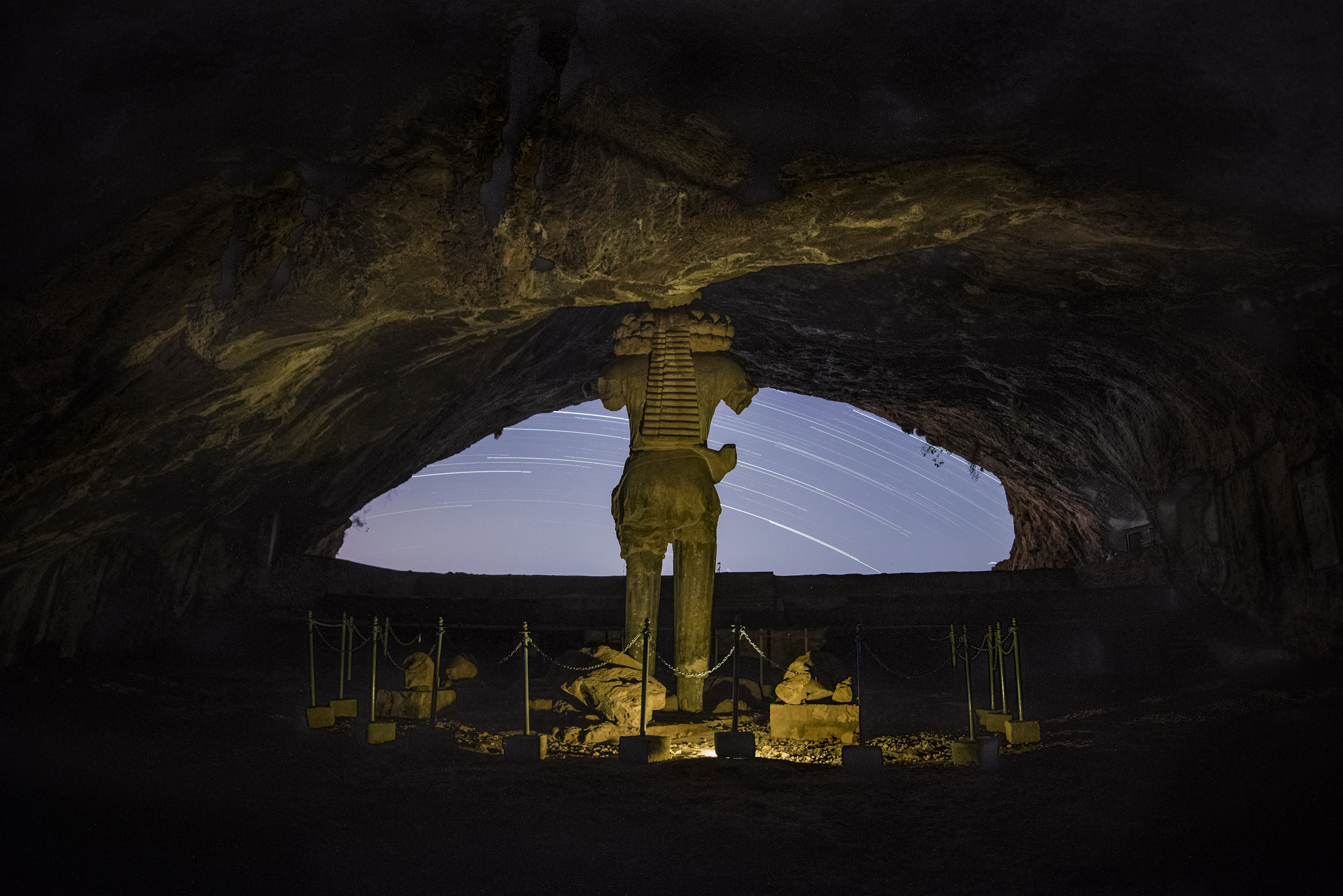

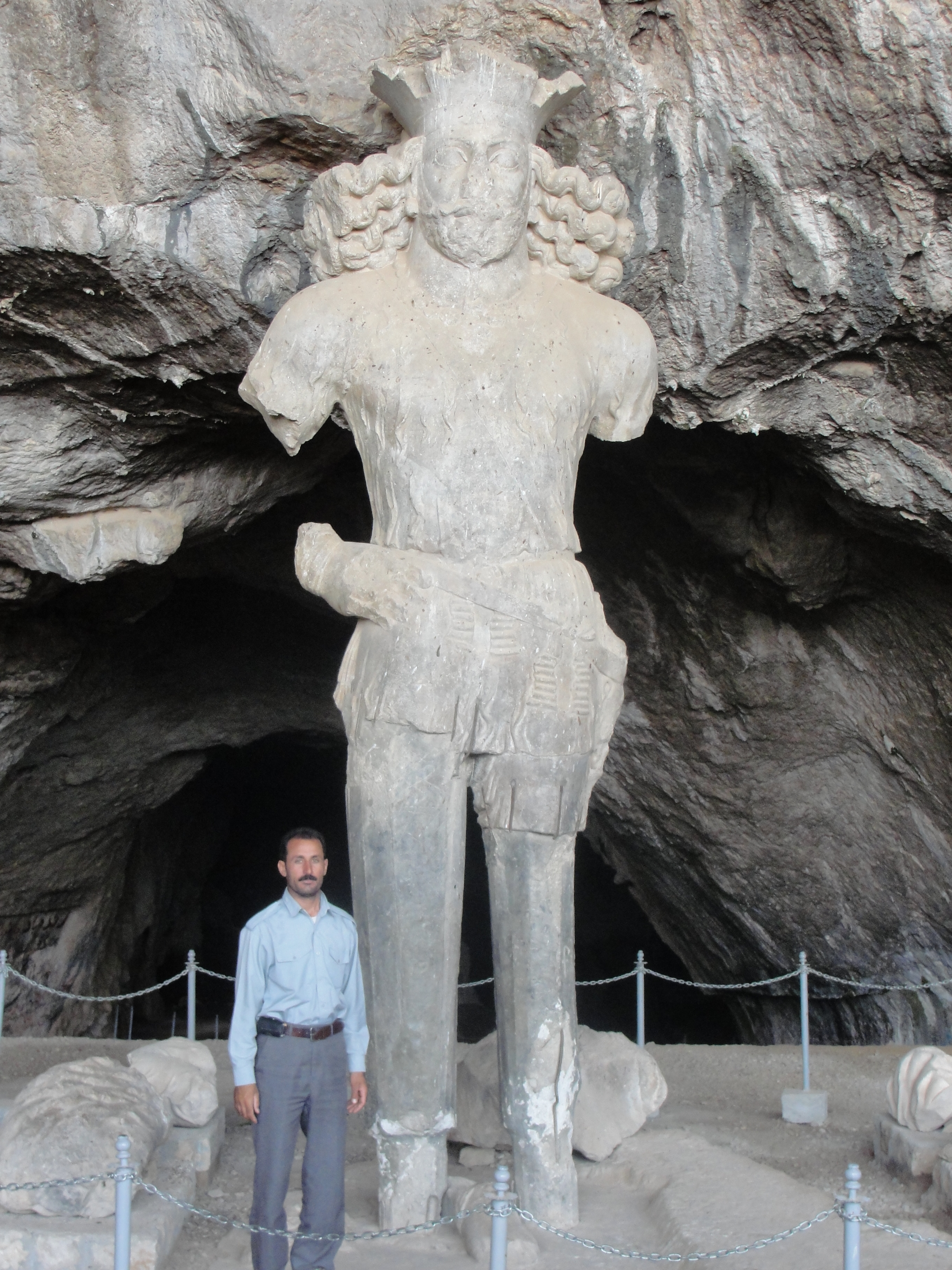

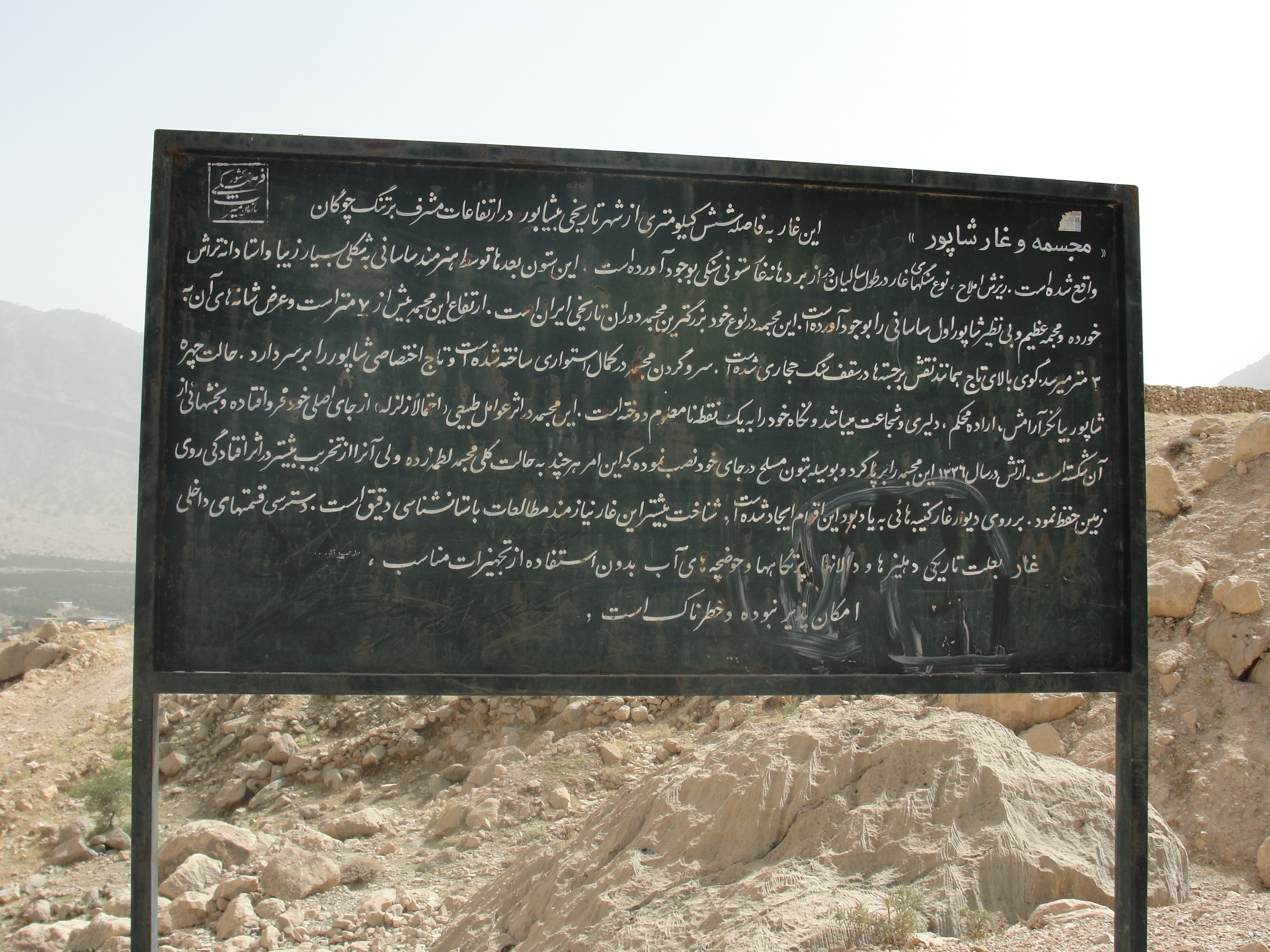

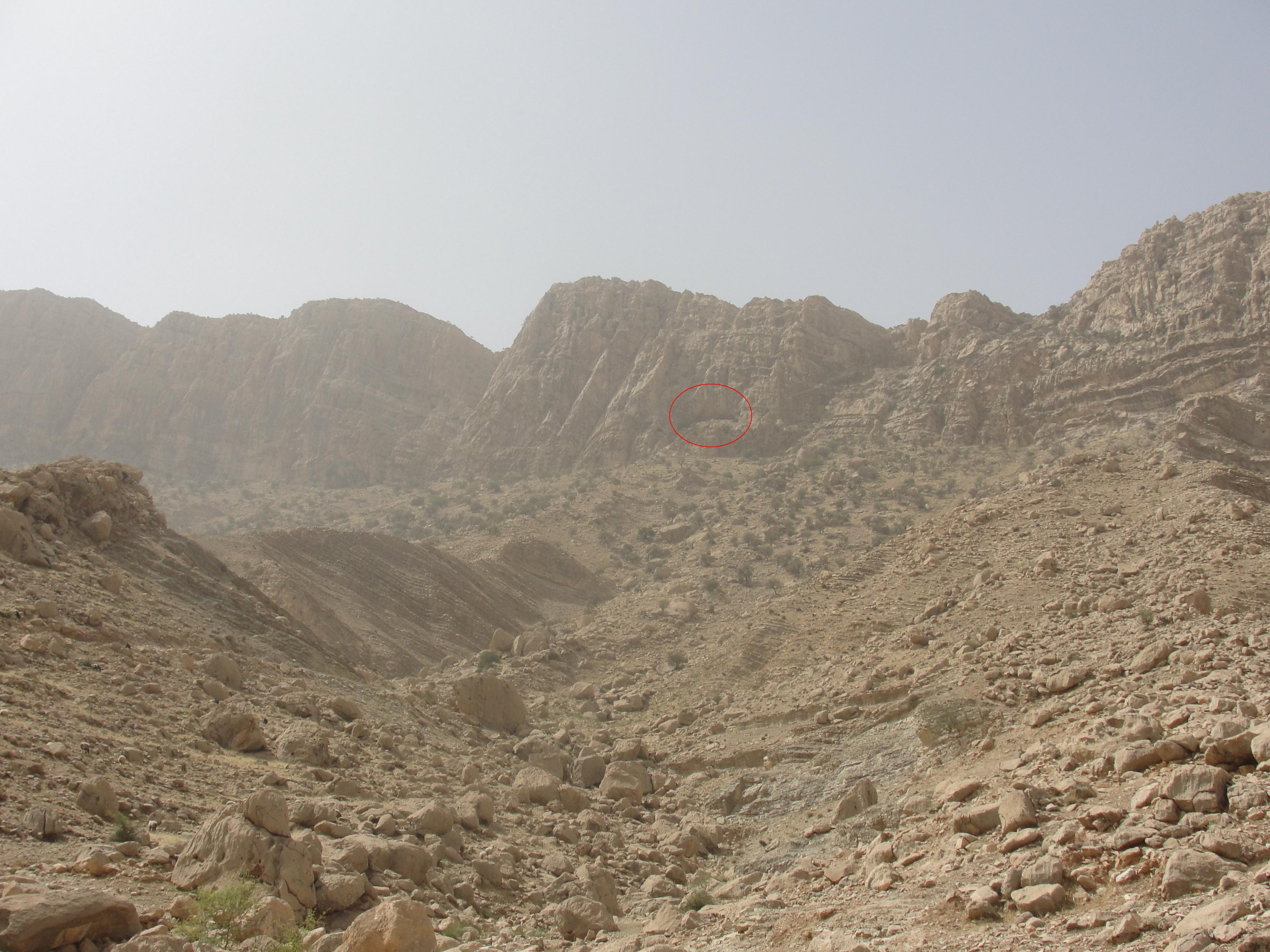

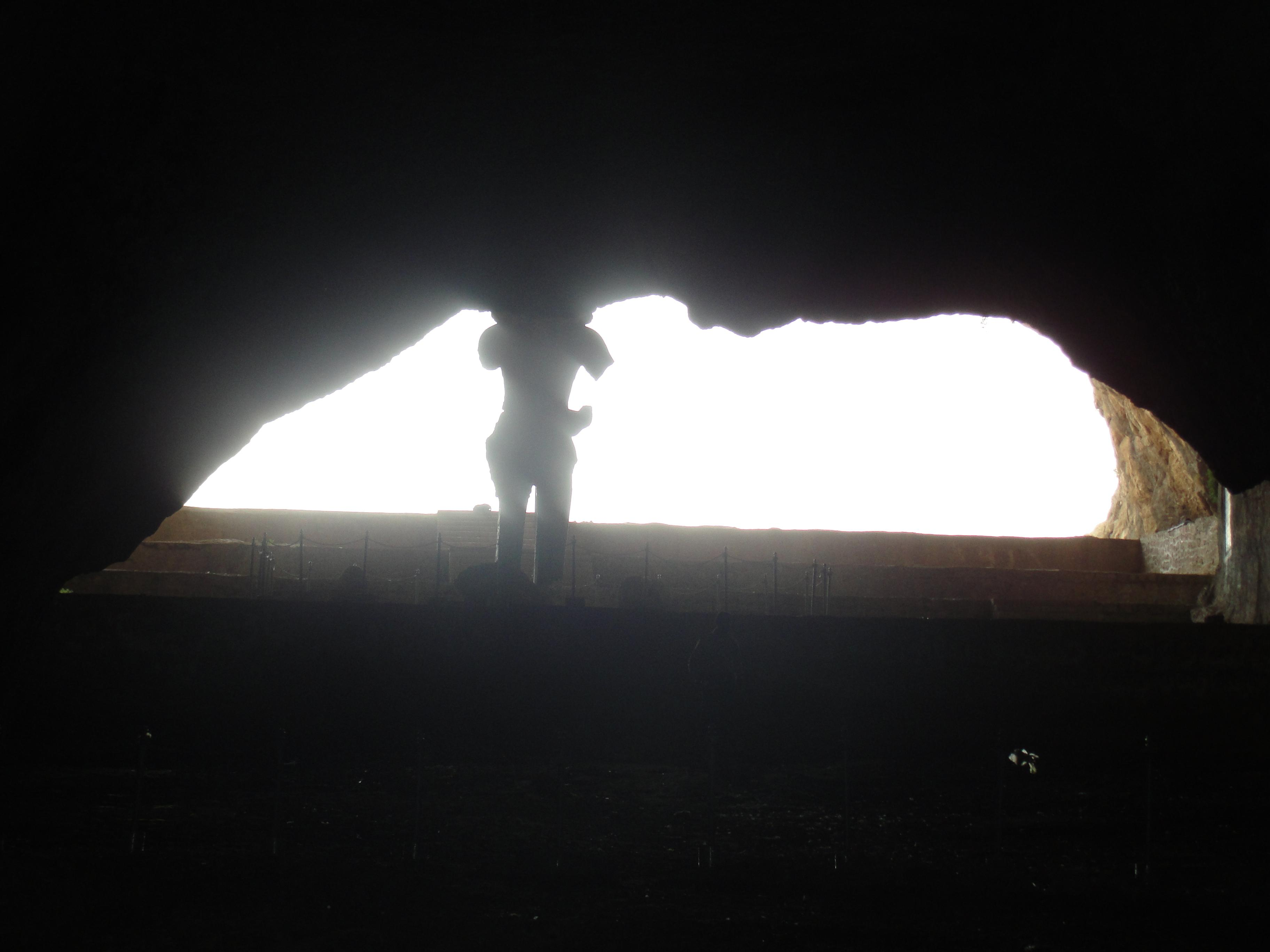

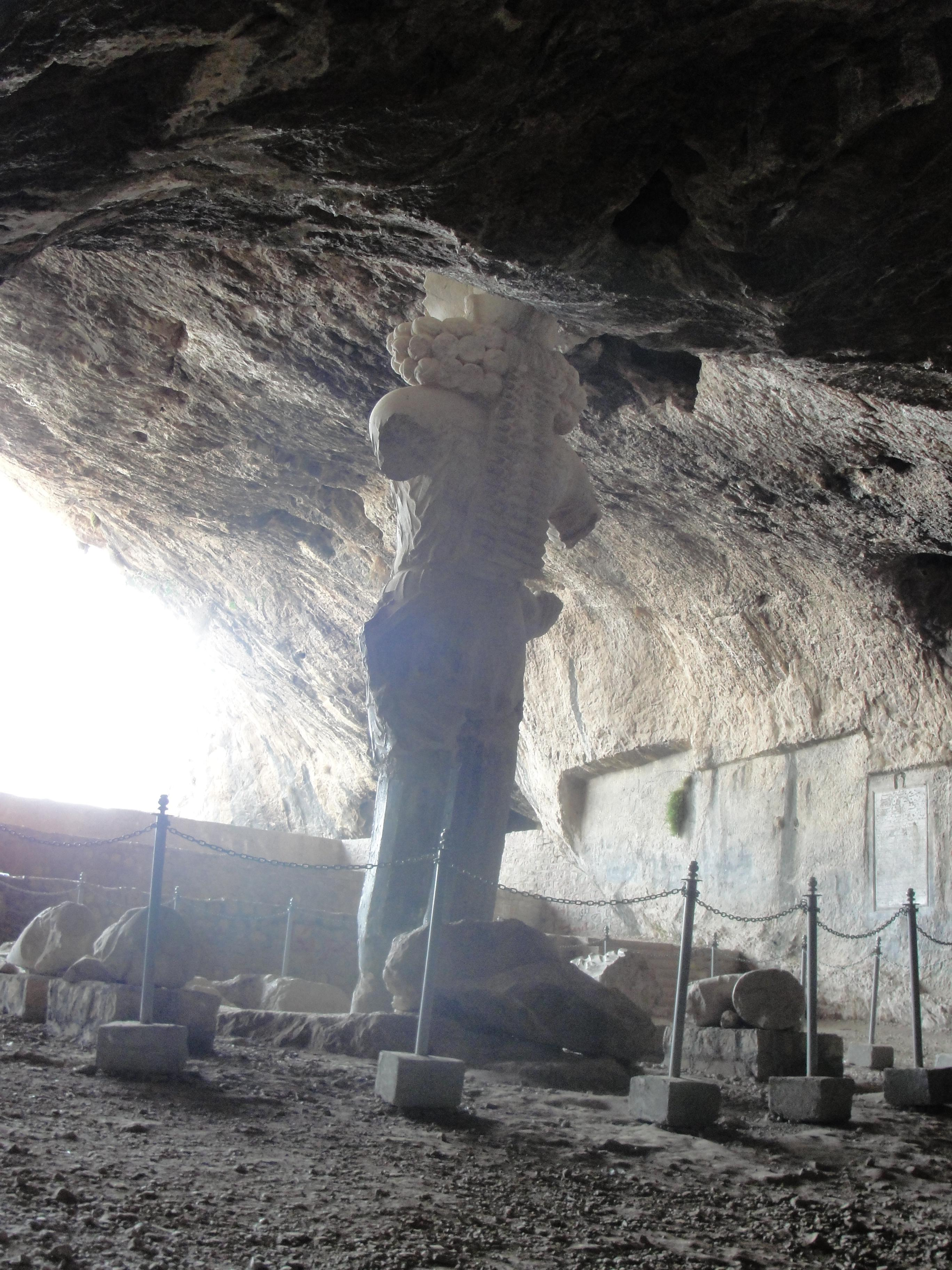

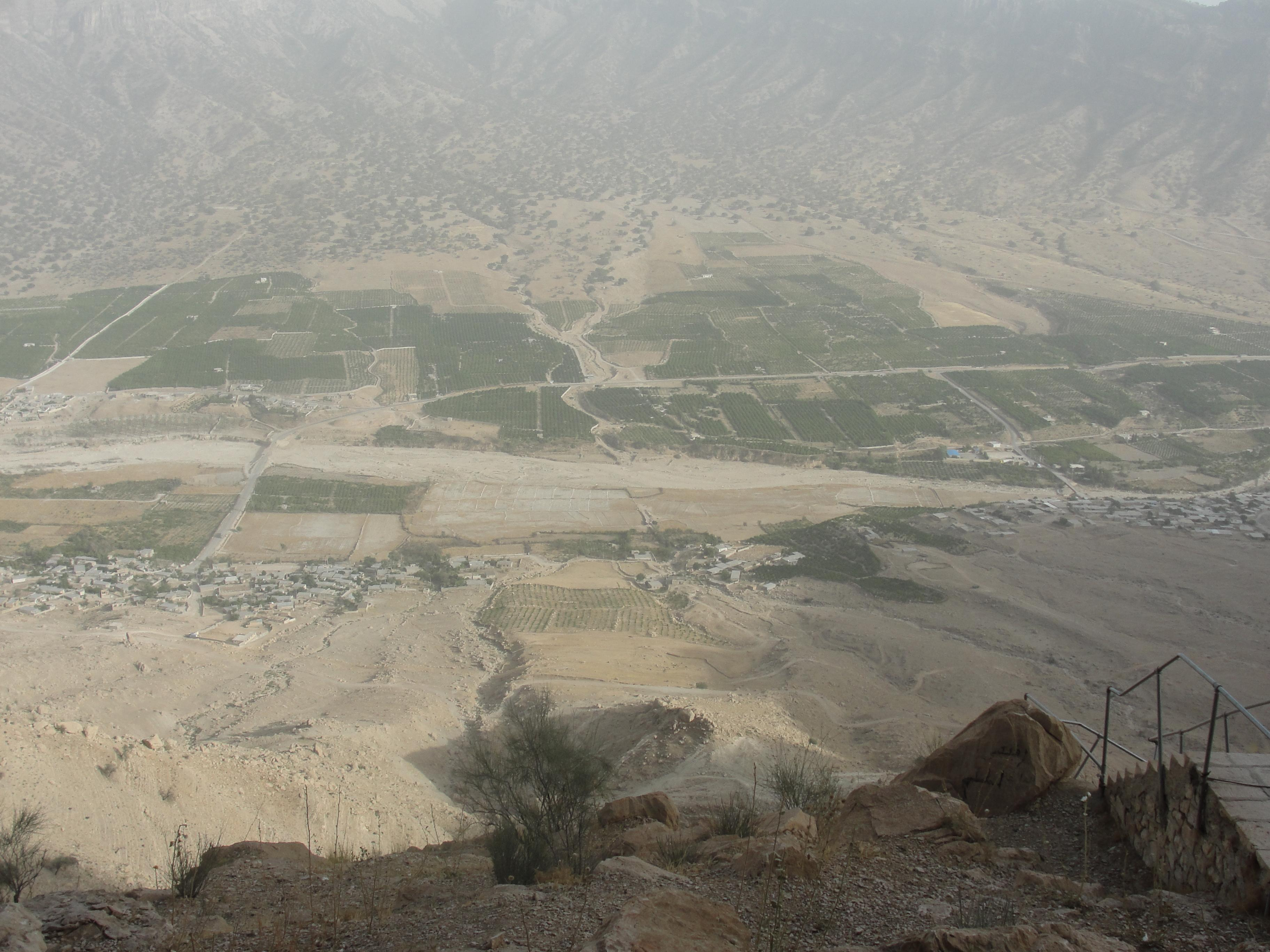

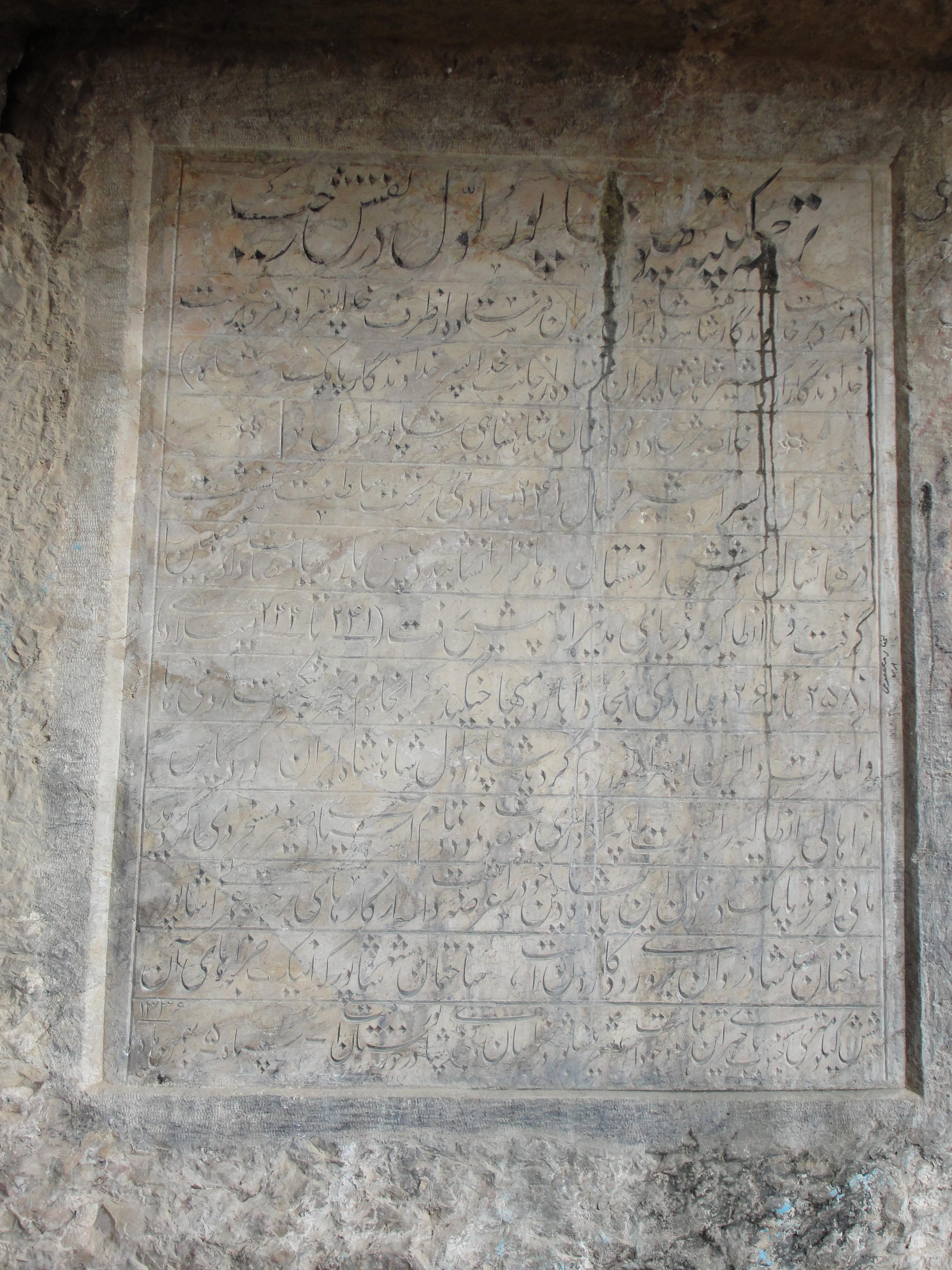

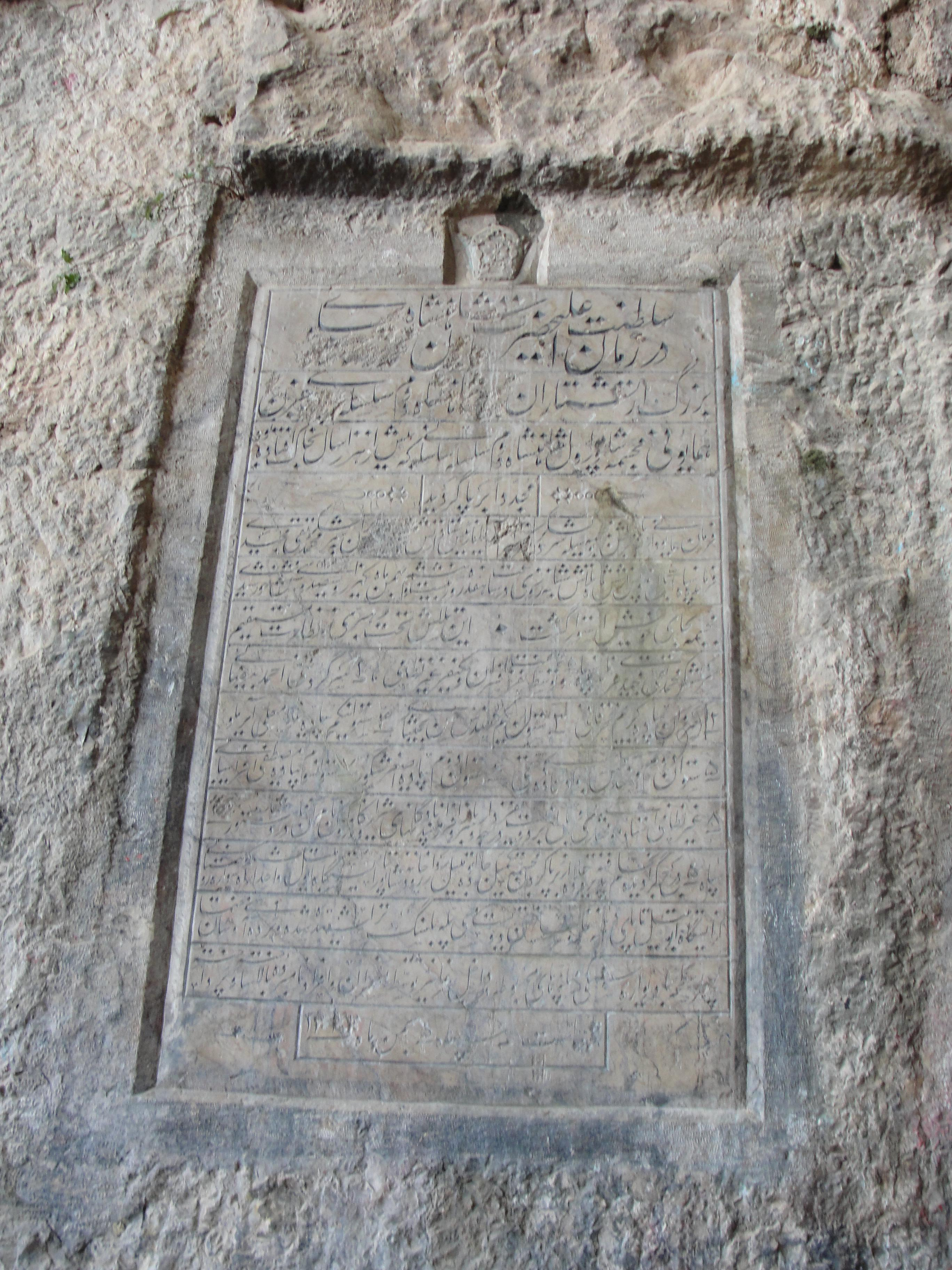
Army inscription on the cave wall describing how the statue was re-erected in 1957

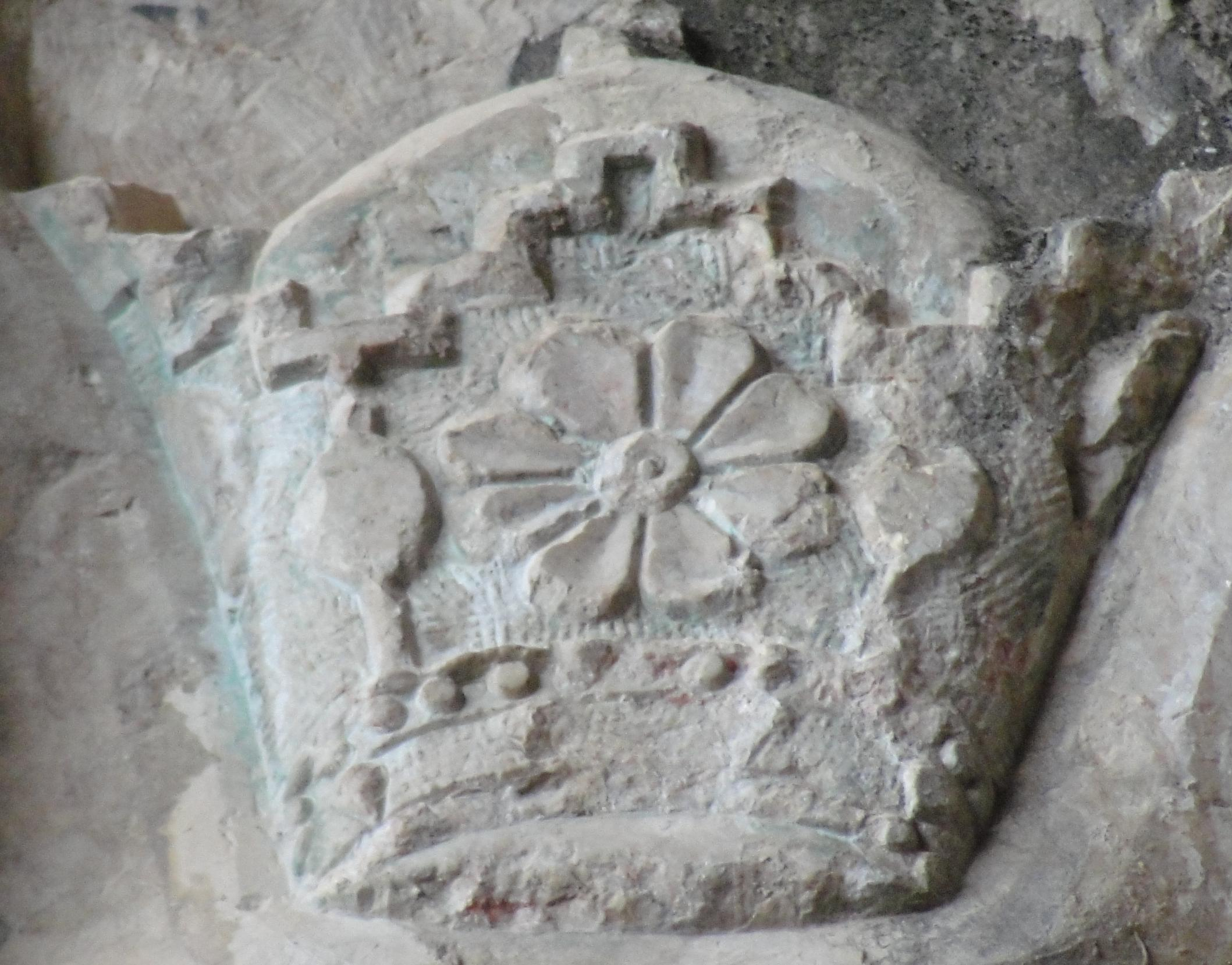
Relief of the Pahlavi Crown

== See also ==
- Sasanian architecture
- Naqsh-e Rostam
