= Sarvestan Palace =

Sassanid-era building in Iran

- کاخ ساسانی سروستان
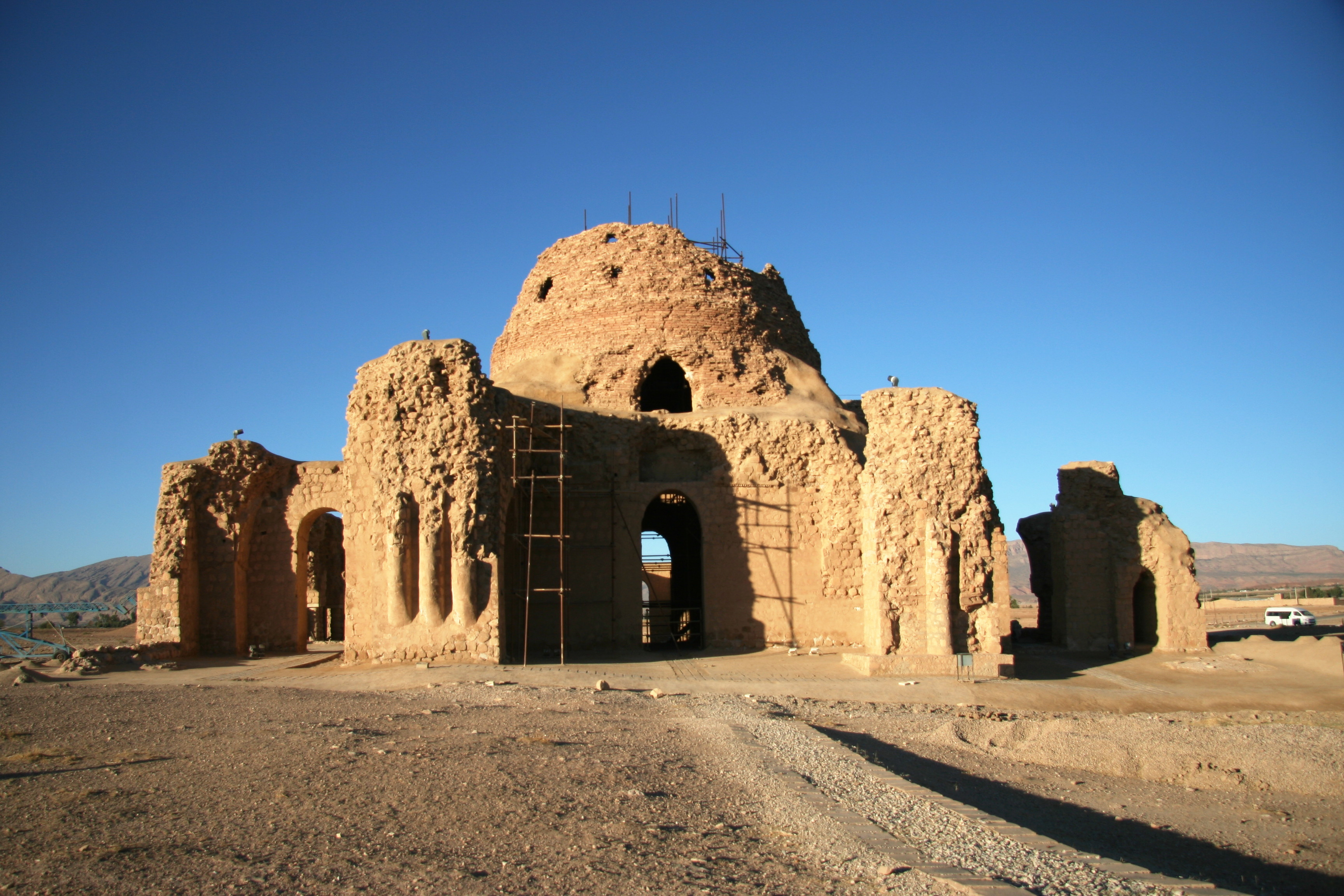
- View of the palace
- Interactive map of the Sarvestan Palace area

General information
- Type: Palace
- Location: Sarvestan, Iran
- Coordinates: 29°11′44″N 53°13′51″E
- Completed: 658-684 AD

UNESCO World Heritage Site
- Part of: Sassanid Archaeological Landscape of Fars Region
- Criteria: Cultural: ii, iii, v
- Reference: 1568-008
- Inscription: 2018 (42nd Session)

{{ | designation1 = INHL | designation1_offname = Sarvestan Palace | designation1_type = Palace | designation1_date = 1931 | designation1_number = 22 | designation1_free1name = Conservation organization | designation1_free1value = Cultural Heritage, Handicrafts and Tourism Organization of Iran }}

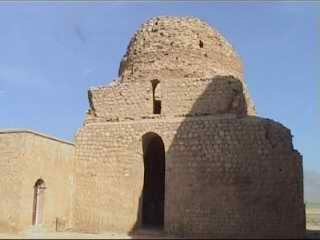
Main hall of the palace

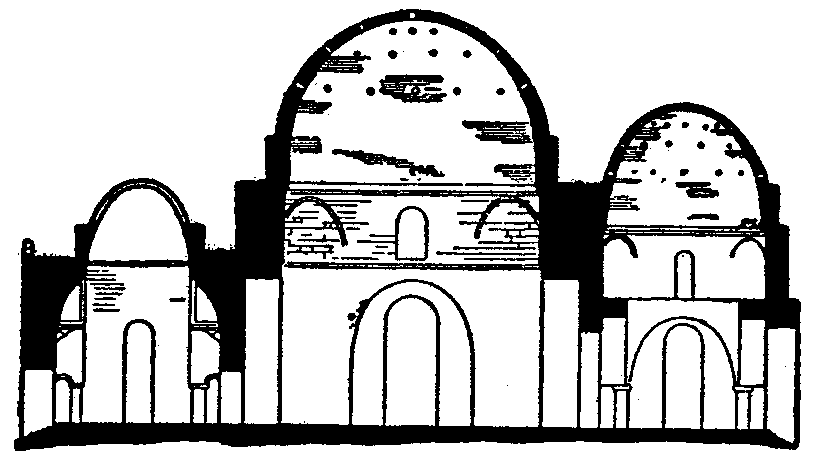
Drawing of the Palace of Sarvestan. The palace measures 130 ft. frontage and 143 ft. deep, with an internal court.

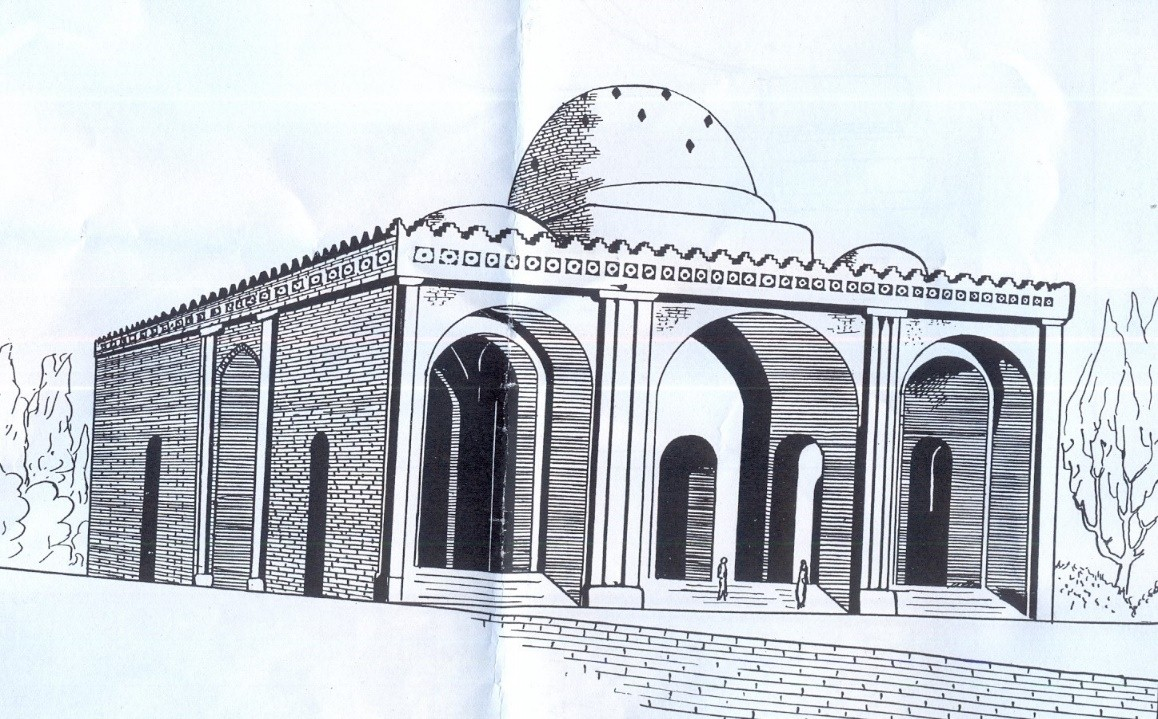
Reconstructional drawing of the Sarvestan Palace

The Sassanid Palace of Sarvestan (Persian: کاخ ساسانی سروستان, romanized: kakh-eh Sassani-ye Sarvestan) is a Sassanid-era building in the Iranian city of Sarvestan, some 90 km southeast from the city of Shiraz. The palace was built in the 7th century AD, and was either a gubernatorial residence or a Zoroastrian fire temple.

The Sarvestan Palace is one of the most important archaeological sites of the field of Sasanian archaeology, and it is designated as one of the eight UNESCO World Heritage Sites in the Sassanid Archaeological Landscape of Fars Region.

== History ==
The Sarvestan Palace was built during the middle of the 7th century. Construction work likely began towards the end of the Sasanian period and was completed after the Arabic conquest.

=== Palace court ===
The name "palace" is considered misleading, because the monument's function is obscure. It may have been a hunting lodge or a sanctuary instead of a palace, because of the presence of a small building, just north of the palace, whose function remains unknown. A visitor who would have arrived from the south, would have seen three iwans. After entering the central one, he would have reached a large square hall under a large dome, made of baked brick. After this, a visitor would have found himself on a rectangular courtyard, surrounded by the residential quarters. The building reminds one of the Ghal'eh Dokhtar and the palace of Ardashir, both near Firuzabad; the difference is that the Sarvestan palace is open to all sides. The building, made of stone and mortar, must have had fine decorations, which partly survive.

== See also ==
- Iranian architecture
- Persian domes
