= Ardashir Investiture Relief =

Sasanian rock relief in Iran

Coordinates: 29.9886°N 52.8719°E

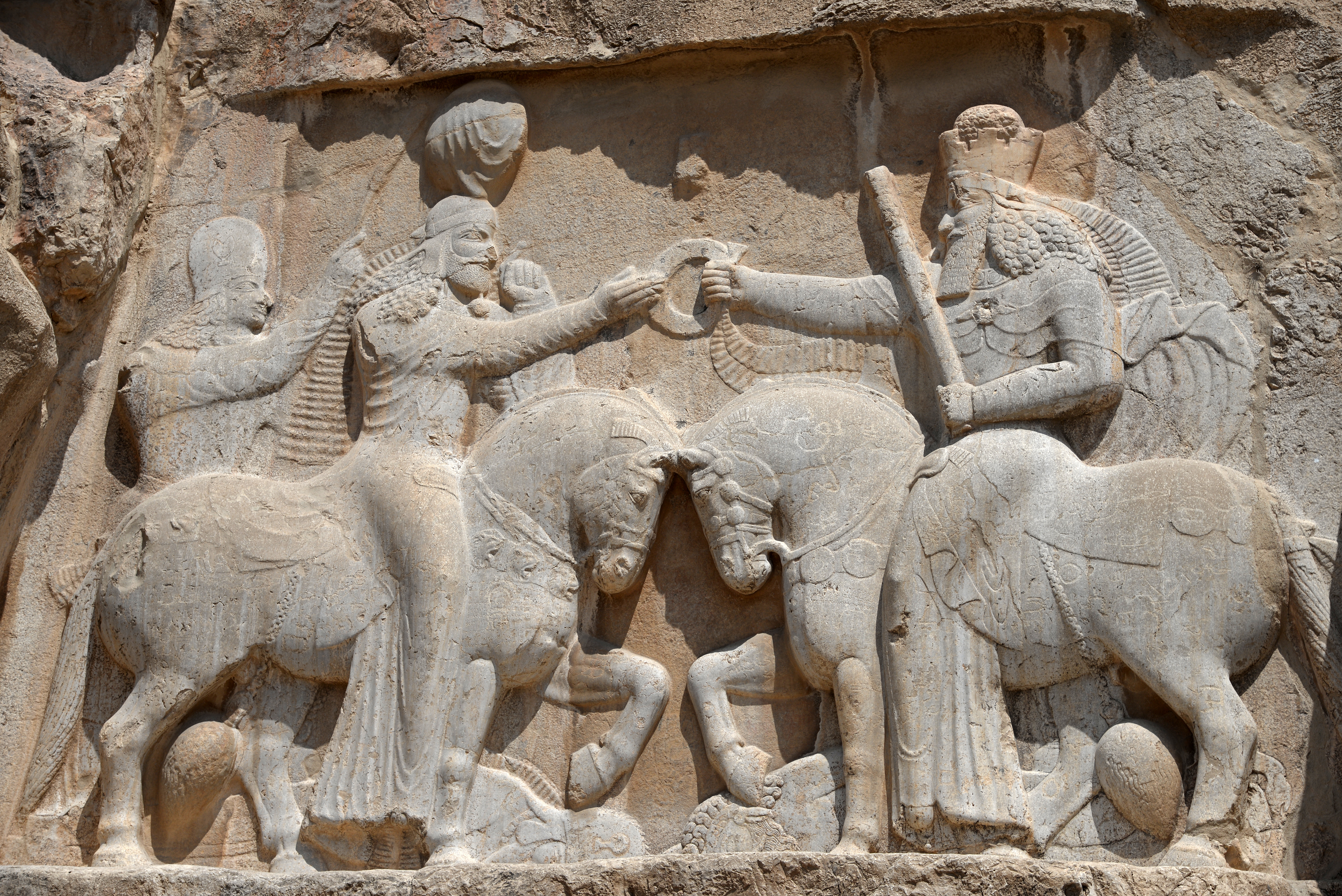
Relief in 2018

The Ardashir Investiture Relief is a Sasanian era rock relief at Naqsh-e Rostam, Fars province, Iran. It is also known as The inscription of Ardashir-e Babakan and Hormozd or the Coronation of Ardashir-e Babakan. This relief was carved around 235 which makes it one of the oldest Sasanian rock reliefs and Sasanian archaeology sites. The relief is well-preserved and is mostly unharmed. It is located in the east corner of Naqsh-e Rostam and was carved 2 meters above the ground. The relief is 6.65m wide and 2.40m high.

The inscription shows Ardashir I's coronation ceremony in which he receives his kingship seal from Ahura Mazda (or Hormozd) and Ahura Mazda appoints him as the Shahanshah of Ērānshahr. Ardashir I and Ahura Mazda are both on horseback, facing each other. In this scene, Ardashir receives the kingship ring from Ahura Mazda. The man behind Ardashir I on the left side of the relief is the high priest Kartir. Ardashir's horse is trampling Artabanus V, the last king of the Parthian Empire, while Ahura Mazda's horse is trampling the devil's dead body.

== Inscription ==
There's an inscription on Ardashir's horse in three languages: Middle Persian, Parthian and Greek. The inscription reads as "This is the figure of Mazdaworshiper, the lord Ardashir, Shahanshah of Iran, whose lineage is from Gods, the son of the lord Papak, the king". There is also another inscription on Ahura Mazda's horse in the aforementioned languages. The Greek version of this inscription reads as "This is the figure of the God Zeus", whereas the Middle Persian version reads as "This is the figure of the God Ahura Mazda".

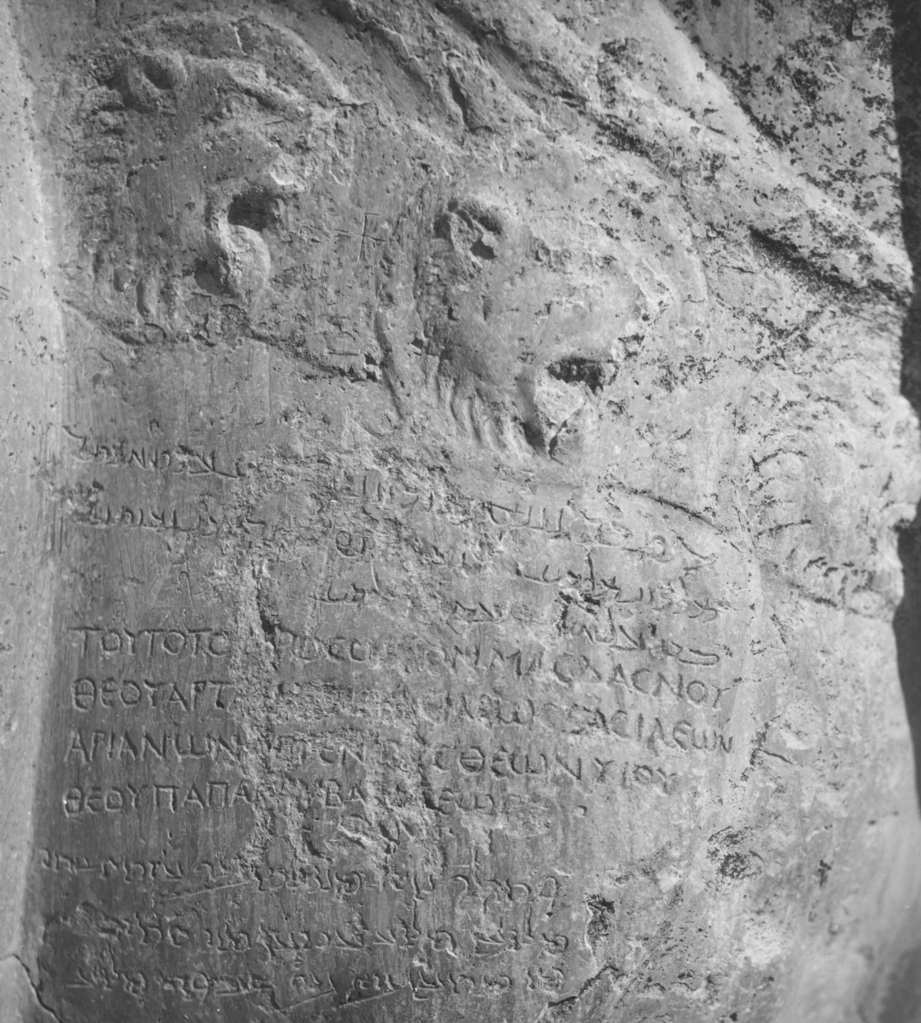
Image of the inscription mentioned in the previous paragraph

This inscription seems to be the oldest inscription from the Sasanian era. Above the Ahura Mazda's figure, there's another three small inscriptions in the aforementioned languages with same content, which reads as "This is Ahura Mazda's (bagh) figure".

== Sources ==
- Persian wikipedia
