= Qal'eh Dokhtar =

Castle in Firuzabad County, Iranian national heritage site

Atashgah Castle
- قلعه آتشگاه
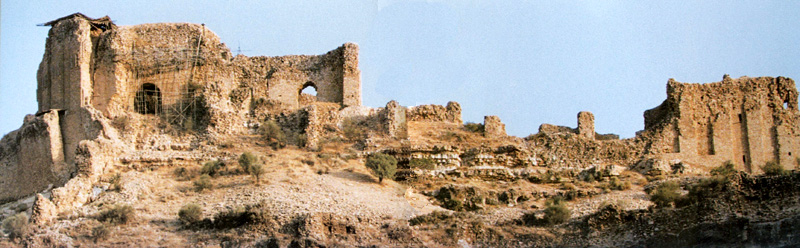
- Dezh-e Dokhtar, or "The Maiden's Castle," Iran, built by Ardashir I in AD 209, before he was finally able to defeat the Parthian empire

- Location within Continental Asia Location within Iran

General information
- Type: Castle
- Architectural style: Sasanian

Iran National Heritage List
- Official name: Maiden Castle
- Type: Ruins
- Designated: 1937
- Reference no.: 269
- Conservation organization: Cultural Heritage, Handicrafts and Tourism Organization of Iran
- Location: Firuzabad, Iran
- Coordinates: 28°55′15″N 52°31′48″E

Sassanid Archaeological Landscape of Fars Region
UNESCO World Heritage Site
- Interactive map of Sassanid Archaeological Landscape of Fars Region
- Location: Iran
- Criteria: Cultural: (ii), (iii), (v)
- Reference: 1568
- Inscription: 2018 (42nd Session)
- Area: 639.3 ha (1,580 acres)
- Buffer zone: 12,715 ha (31,420 acres)

Qal'eh Dokhtar, Ghale Dokhtar, Dokhtar Castle or Dezh Dokhtar (Persian: دژ دختر, lit. 'Maiden Castle') is a castle built by Ardashir I in present-day Fars, Iran, in 209 AD. It is located on a mountain slope near the route connecting the cities of Firuzabad and Kavar. It is important in the field of Sasanian archaeology and is one of the eight designated UNESCO World Heritage Sites of the Sassanid Archaeological Landscape of Fars Region.

== Name ==
The name of the castle implies it was dedicated to the Goddess Anahita, to whom the term "Maiden" refers.

== Location ==
The castle is built on a high bluff which overlooks the river and roadway running south from Fars. The site was likely chosen since it controls the main access point to the city of Firuzabad, or Ardashir-Khwarrah, which was founded by Ardashir I around the same time.

== Specification ==
It was presumably roofed by an arched vault. Beyond this there are steps to a third level and a large rectangular room with ¼ circle squinches at each corner supporting a domed roof. This was buttressed by very thick walls on all sides, presumably to ensure its stability, and the cupola could be reached by a spiral staircase on the south side.

The 1,800-year-old castle has lost some four meters of its original height over the last century and experts warn if urgent measures are not taken to enforce it, the castle may soon collapse.

== Gallery ==
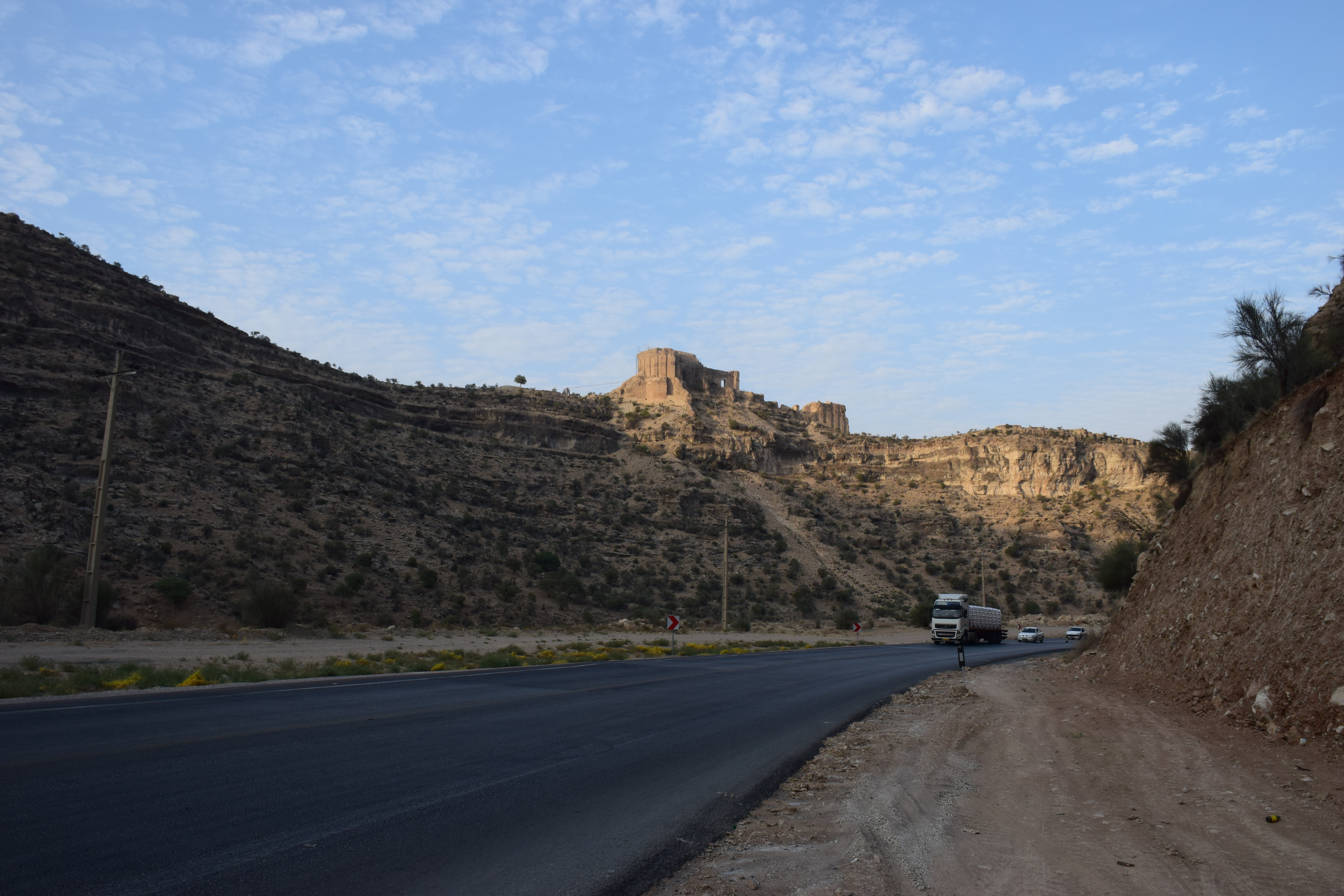
Far view from the castle

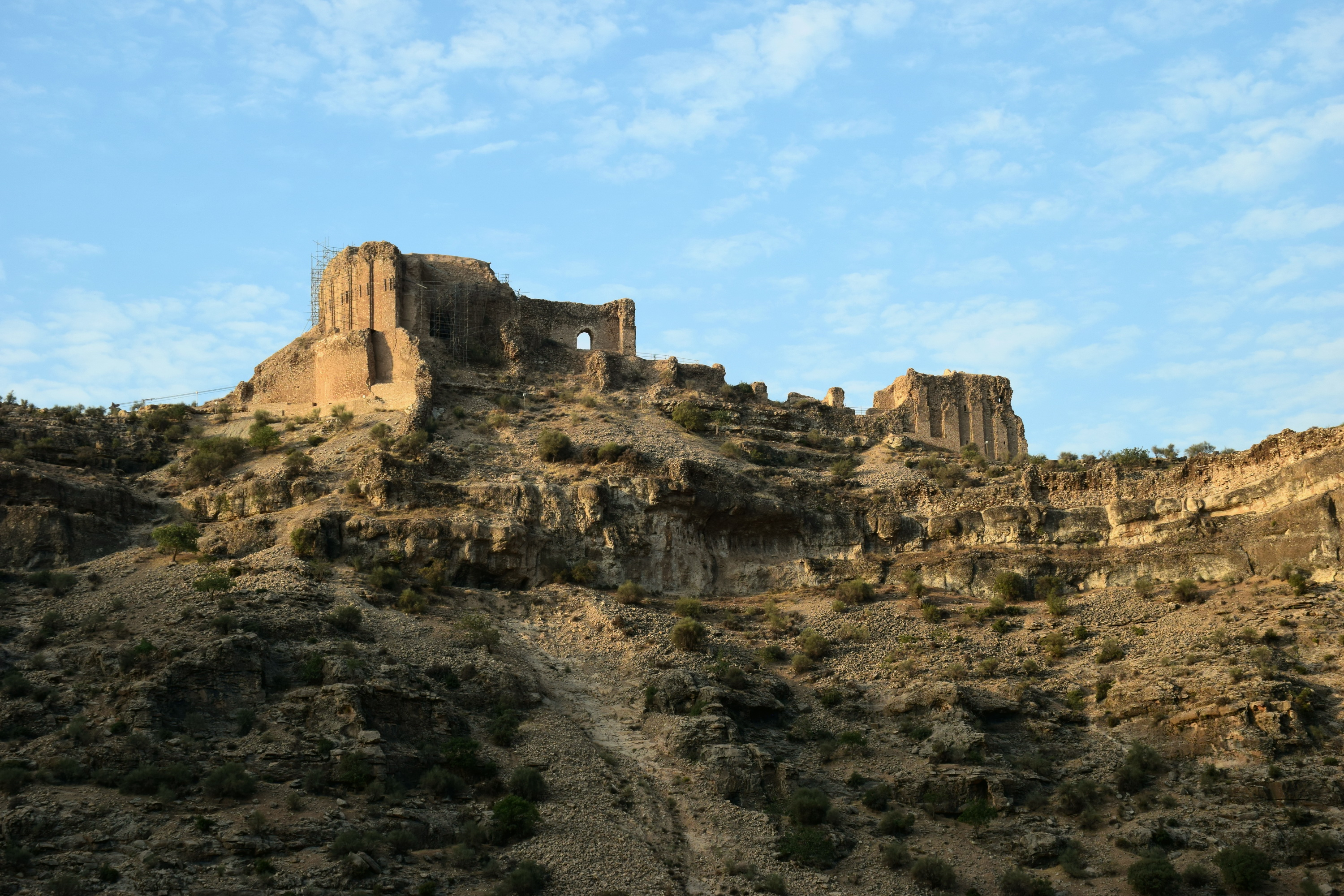
Far view from the castle

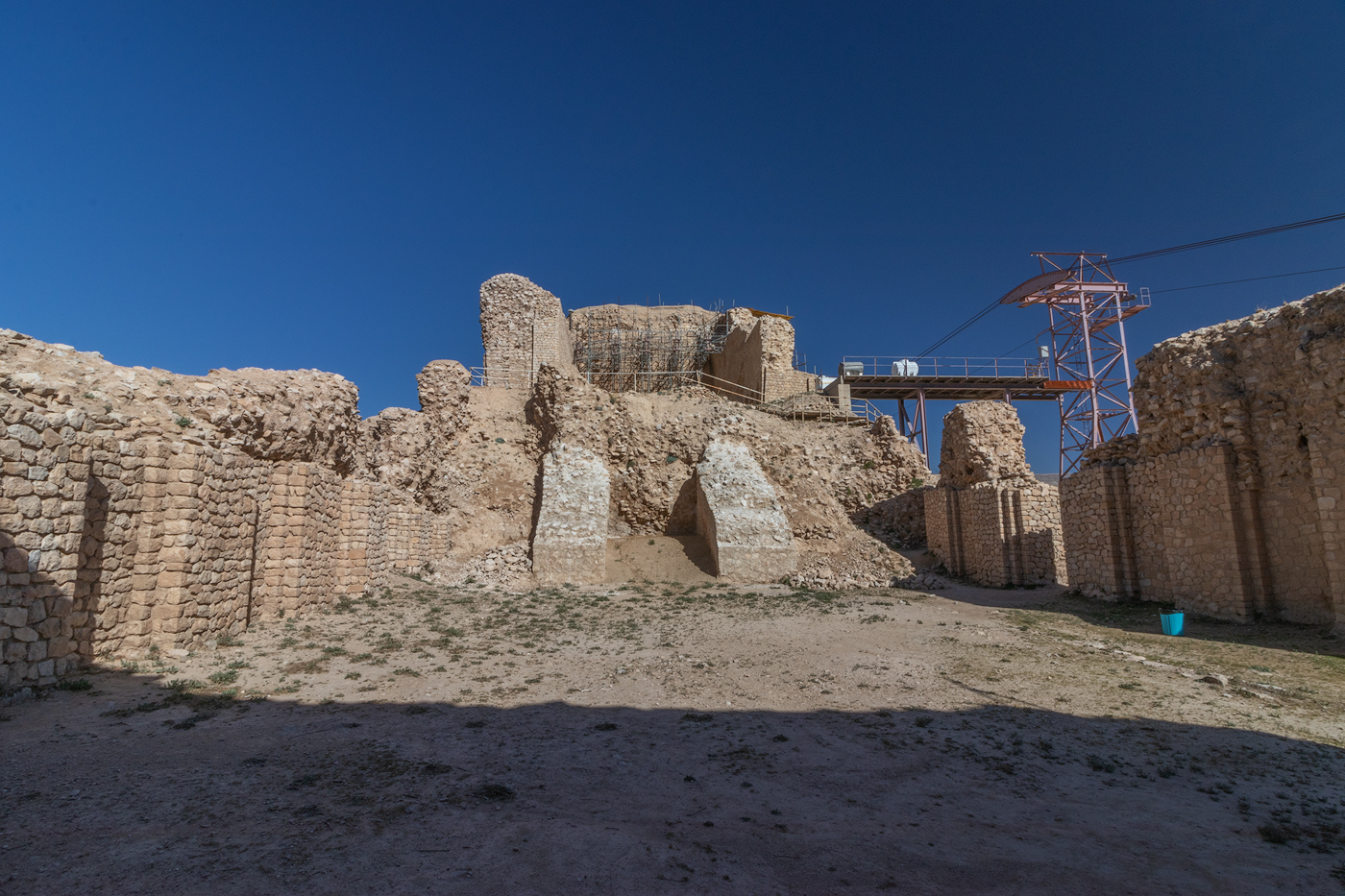
Palace

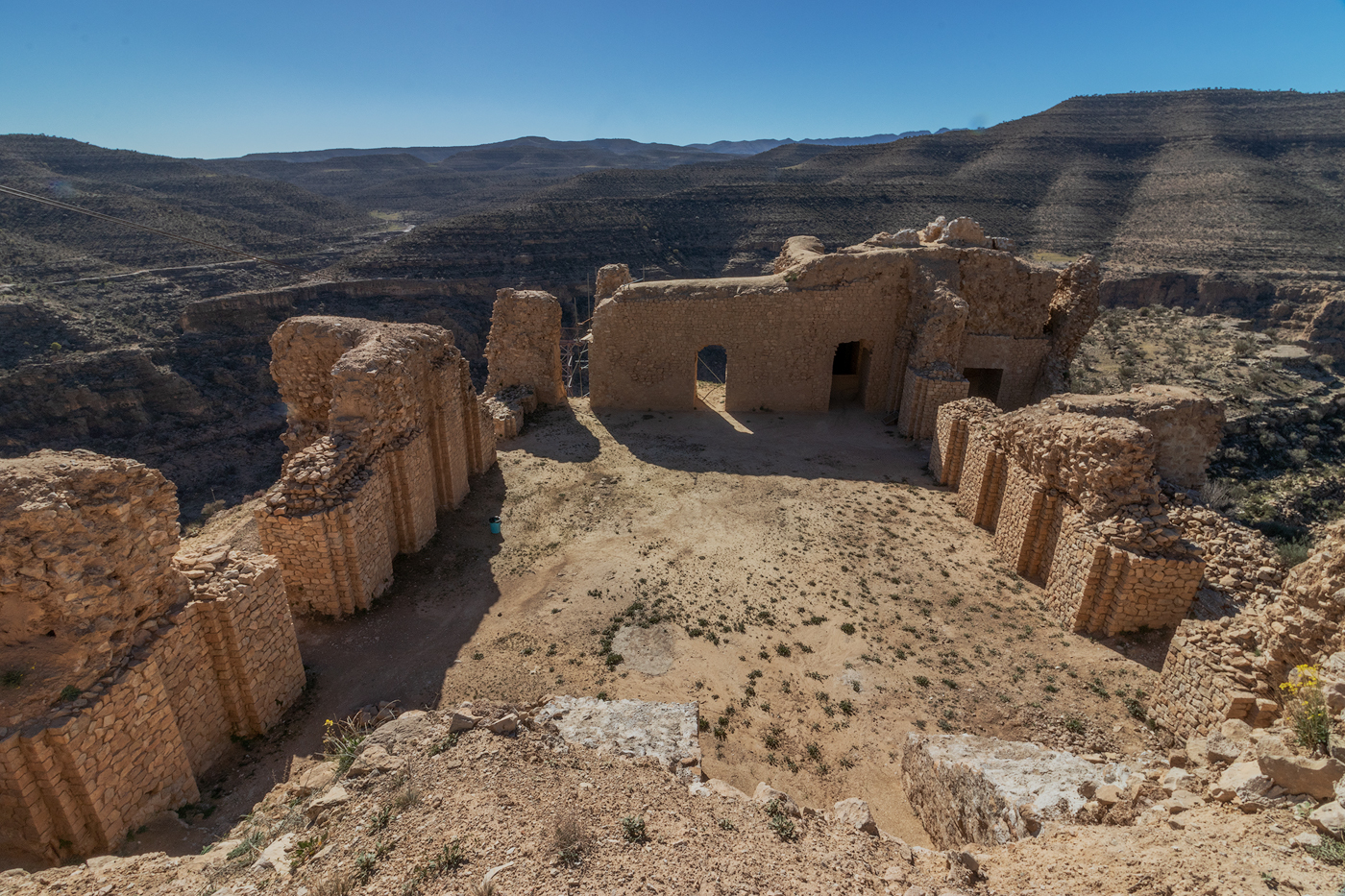
Palace

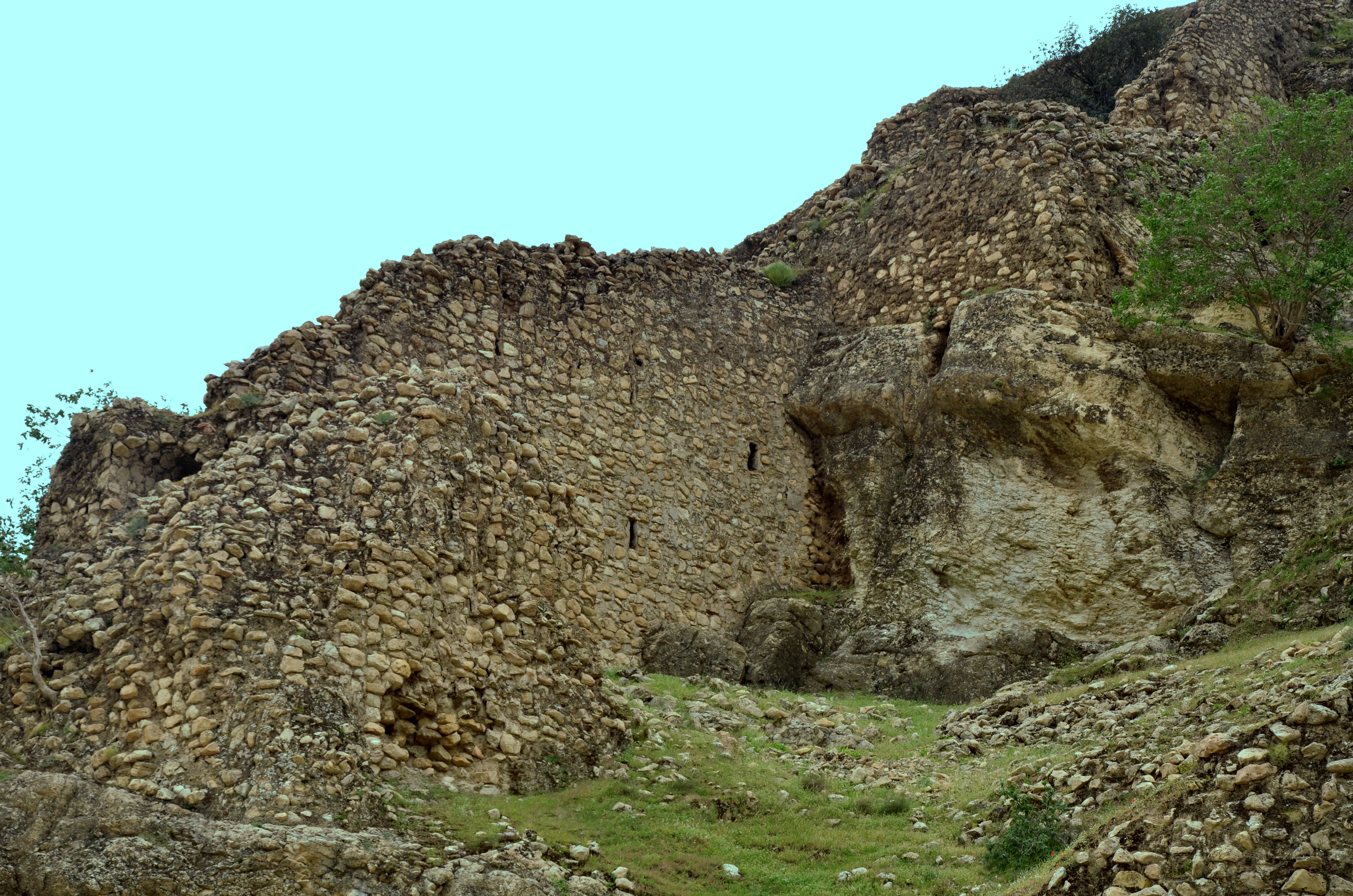
View of the castle

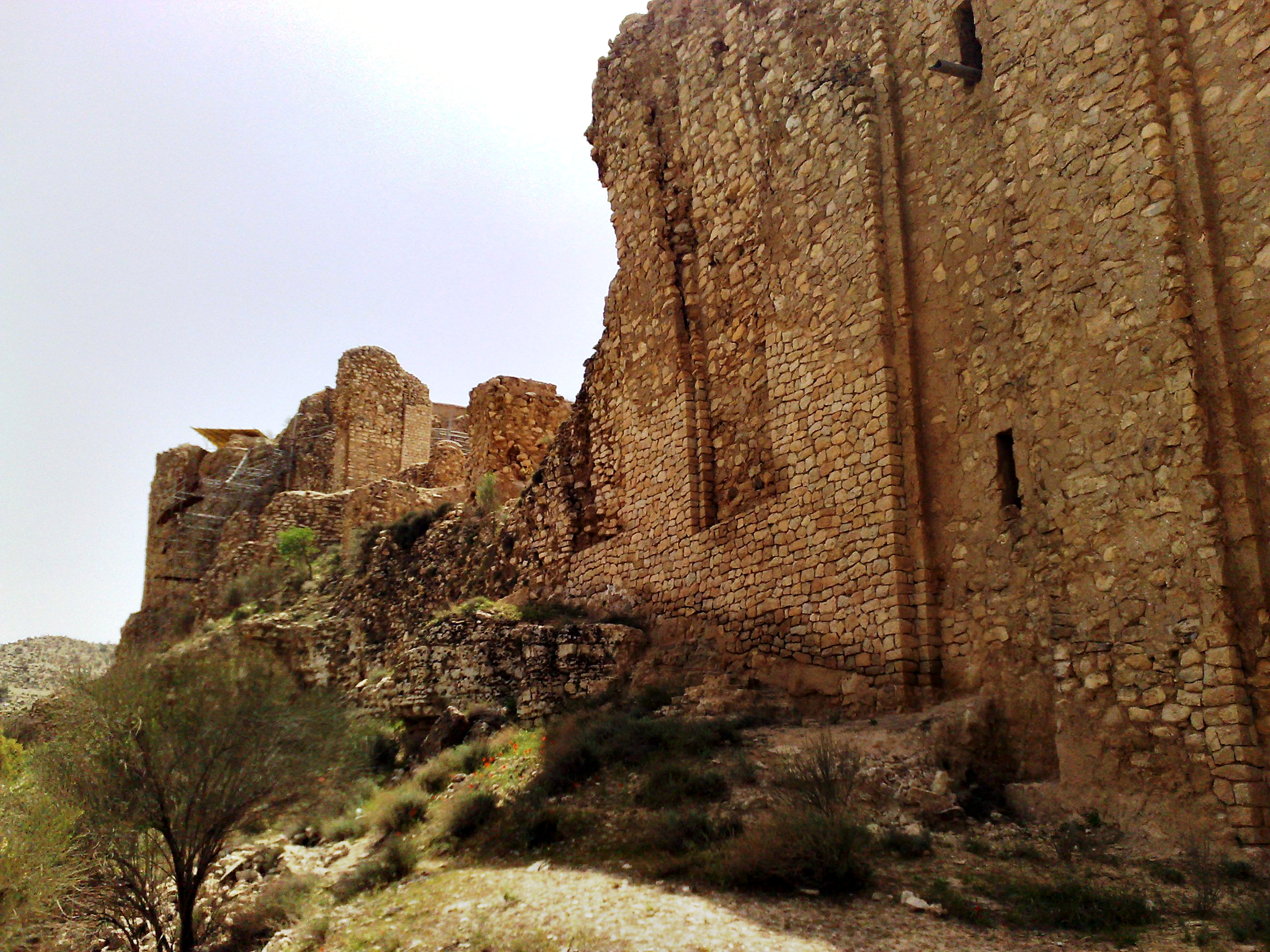
View of the castle

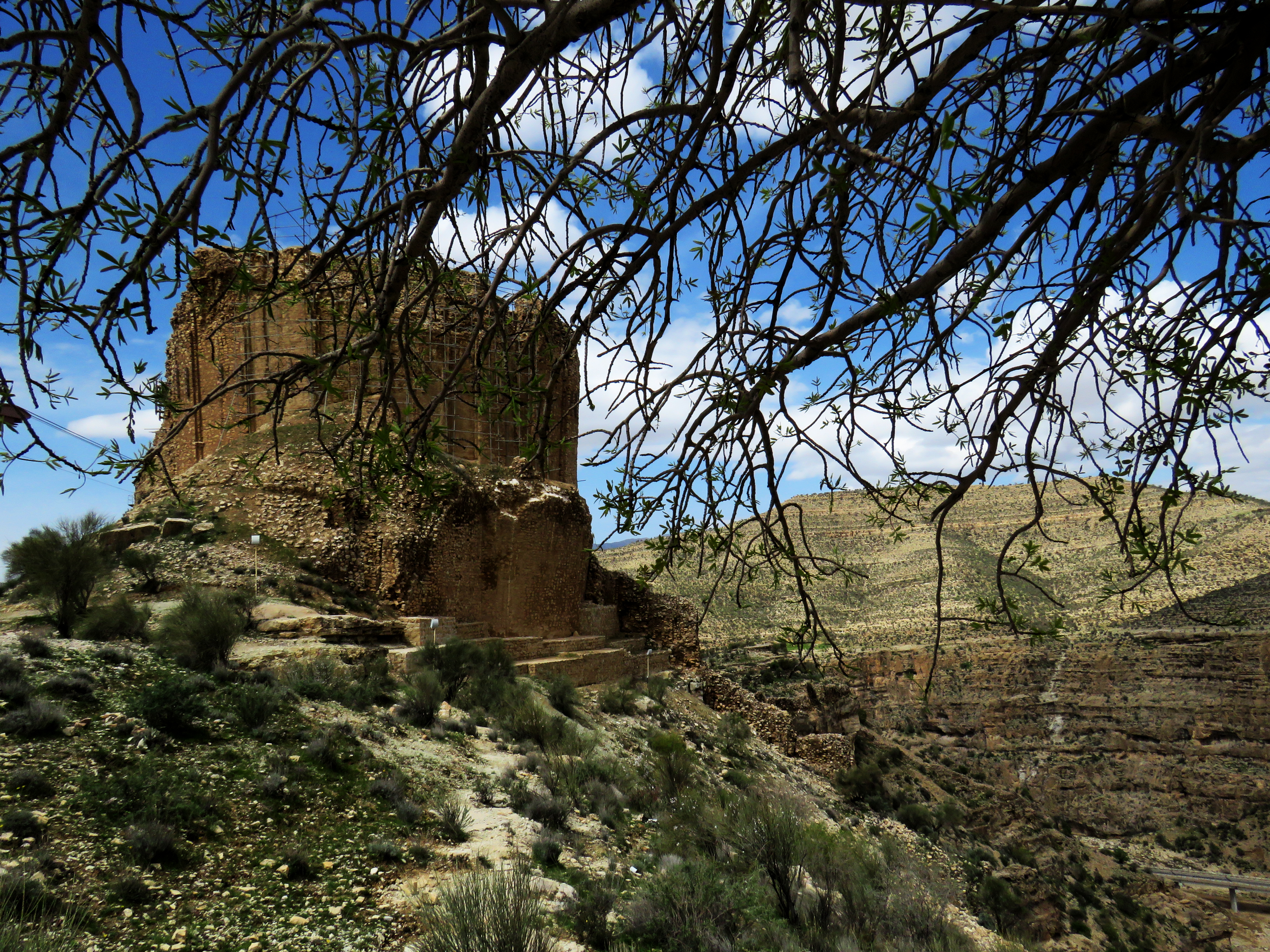
View of the castle

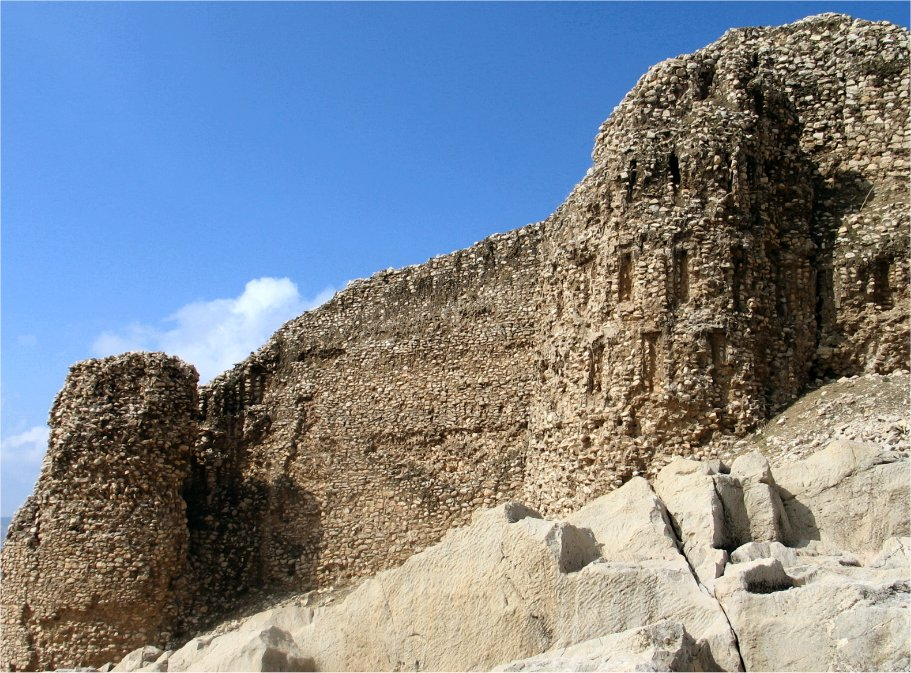
View of the castle

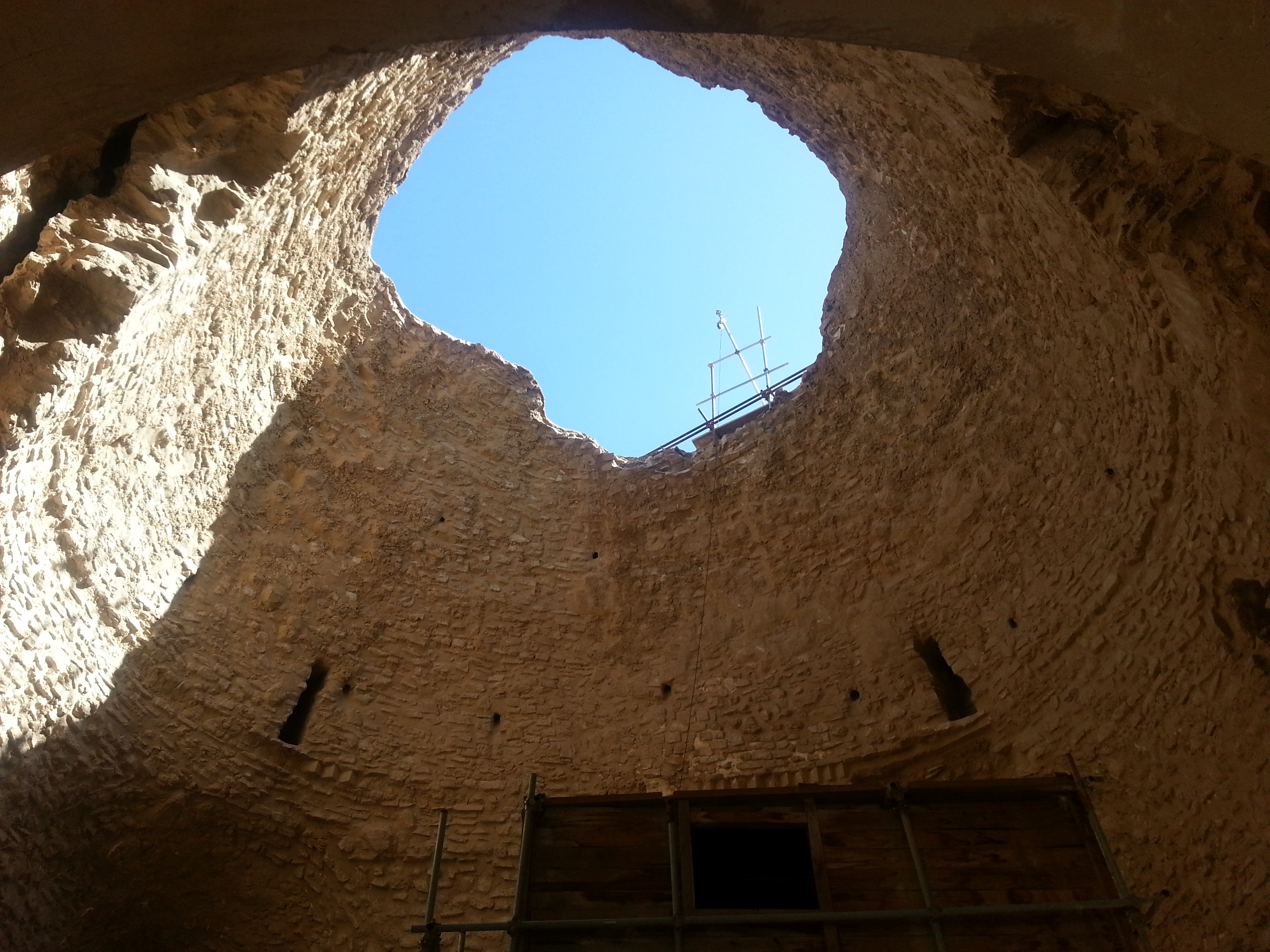
Main chamber

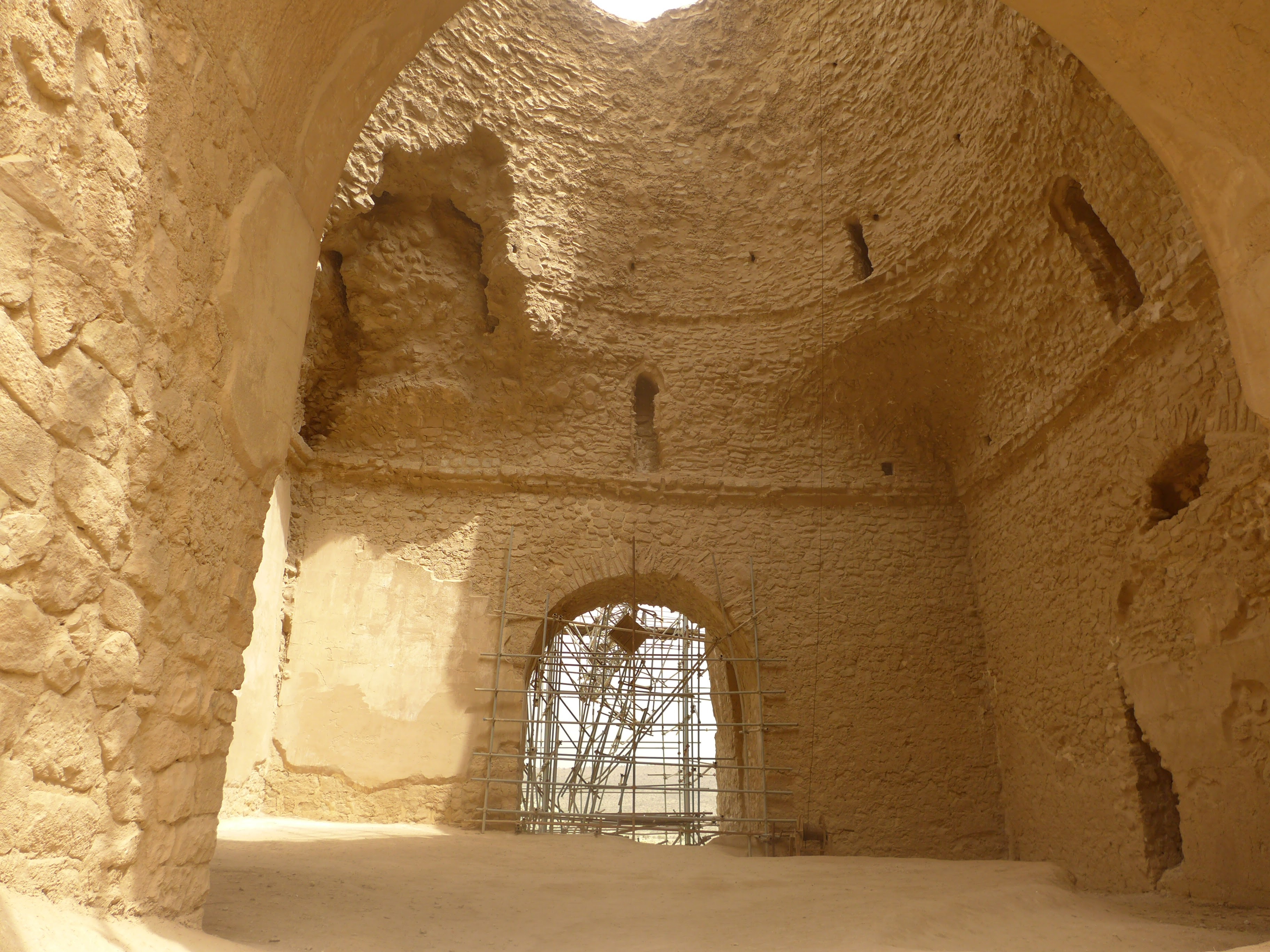
Main chamber

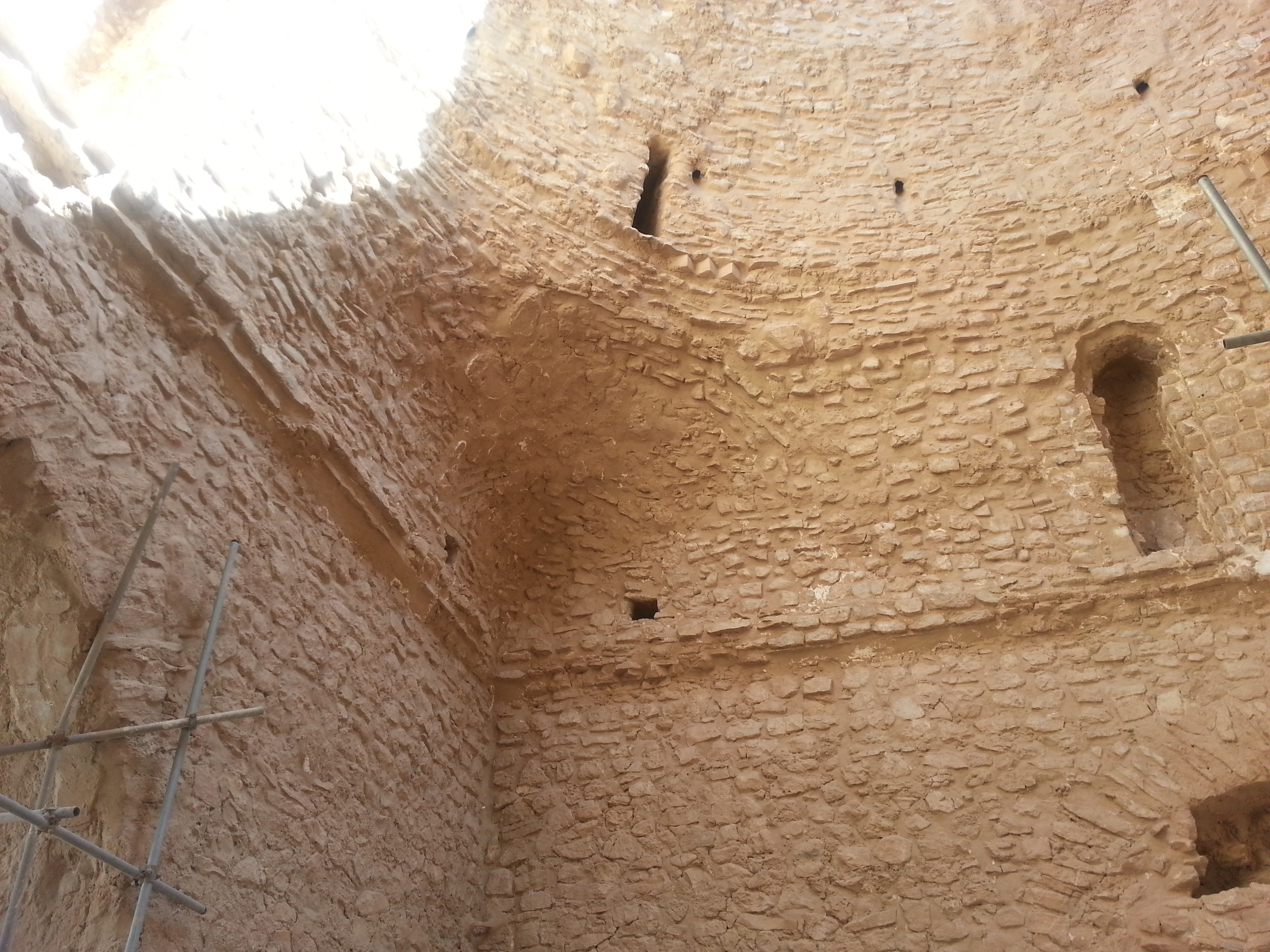
Main chamber

== See also ==
- List of Iranian castles
- Iranian architecture
- Sassanid
- Persian domes
