= Karimi =

Karimi (کریمی), a Persian surname of a once famous merchant clan from Karima (کریمه). It is also derived from the Arabic name Kareem for people of Arab descent. It may refer to the following notable people:

== Sports ==
- Abbas Karimi (swimmer), Afghan swimmer
- Ali Karimi (disambiguation), several Iranian footballers
- Farshid Karimi, Iranian football goalkeeper
- Mahmoud Karimi Sibaki, Iranian football striker
- Ali Karimi (Tabriz), Iranian footballer
- Firouz Karimi, Iranian football manager
- Obaidullah Karimi, Afghan footballer

== Art ==
- Niki Karimi, Iranian actress and movie director
- Nosrat Karimi, Iranian actor, director, make-up artist, University professor, scriptwriter and sculptor
- Reza Karimi, Iranian fine artist, water color painter
- Sahraa Karimi, Afghan film director
- Mandana Karimi, Model, Bollywood actress
- Forugh Karimi, Afghan-Dutch writer

== Politics ==
- Farah Karimi, Iranian-Dutch politician
- Mehran Karimi Nasseri, Iranian refugee who lived in the departure lounge of Terminal One in Charles de Gaulle Airport
- Jamal Karimi-Rad, Minister of Justice of the Islamic Republic of Iran
- Sher Mohammad Karimi, Afghan general and Chief of Army Staff

== Others ==
- Karimis, an Islamic capitalist group during the 11th–13th centuries
- Ahmad Karimi-Hakkak, Persian literary figure and Iranist
