= Mina Dastgheib =

Iranian poet

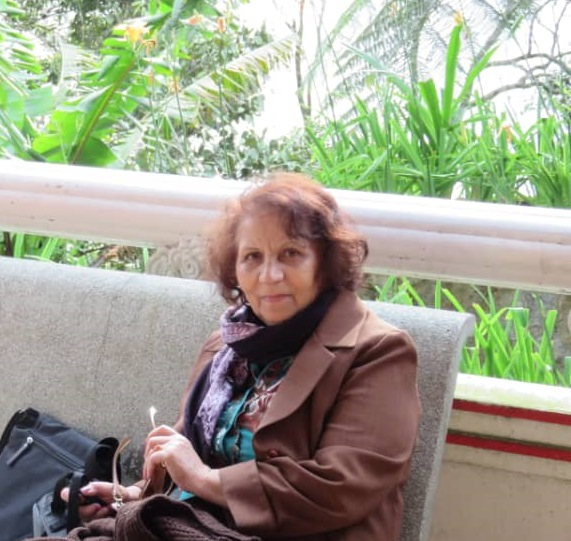
- Born: 1943 (age 82–83); Shiraz
- Education: Shiraz University (B.A.); Tehran University
- Occupations: Poet, teacher
- Father: Javad
- Relatives: Abdolali Dastgheib (brother)

Mina Dastgheib is a contemporary poet born in Shiraz in 1943 and graduated from Shiraz University and Tehran University. Mina taught English and Persian literature at high schools in Tehran and Shiraz. Mina has been writing poetry since she was young and she has published 12 collections of poetry.

== Biography ==
Mina grew up in an educated family interested in literature. Her father Javad was the head of Departments of Education in Firoozabad and Jahrom. Her older brother, Abdolali, is a well-known writer and critic. From a young age, Mina took a keen interest in reading literary books and learned about poets and writers of Iran and other countries. After graduating from high school and getting a bachelor's degree in English literature from Shiraz University, she went to Tehran and obtained a teaching certificate from The Higher Education College (دانشسرای عالی). Mina worked for many years as a teacher of English language and Persian literature in Tehran and Shiraz.

=== List of publications ===
Maah dar Kariz (The Moon in Aqueduct, 1969)

Daas-hay-e Asr (The Sickles of the Evening, 1973)

Ba Chashmani az Khakestar (With Eyes of Ashes, 1975)

Ghmnakan e Sobh (The Mourners of the Morning, 1978)

Dast dar Dast e Zaman (Hand in Hand with Time, 1997)

Mah e Shekasteh Kooh ha ra Aah Mikashad (The Broken Moon Sighs the Mountains, 2000)

Khonakaye Raz (The Coolness of Mystery, 2006)

Ba Khooshe i Angoor be Vade gah Miayi va Aseman e Khonak ra Minooshi (You Come with a Bunch of Grapes and Drink the Cool Sky, 2007), Sokhan Migooyi Kalmeha dar man Azad Mishavand (You Speak, the Words are Released in Me, 2007)

The translation of Khonakaye Raz (The Coolness of Mystery) into English by Enayat Dast-e-Ghaybi (2010)

Shab dar Cheragh e Nazareh Khod Misookht (The Night Was Burning in its Own Sight, 2012)

Ba an Haraas e Ziba Gol Dadim Choon Khandeh e Cheraghi dar Baran (We Blossomed with that Beautiful Fear Like a Light smiling in the Rain, 2017)

Viran-e Viran-am, amma Tarh-i az Shekoofeha-ye Baadaam dar Dast Daaram (I am Ruined but I hold an image of Almond Blossoms, 2020)

Mosaferan dareh-ye-Howl (Travellers of the Valley of Horror, 2025)

She has also published a translation of selected international poems from English into Persian (2026)

=== Literary awards ===
"The Coolness of Mystery" was selected as the referee’s choice in the Seventh Festival of Persian Culture in Fars (2006). "You speak, the Words are Released in Me" was recognized as one of the top seven works of Iranian women poets and won the Sun Award.

=== Critical view ===
Most of Mina's poems convey a sad feeling at first glance, while they have a social or political message. A review of the books of this poet shows her literary evolution. Some of her poems are shrouded in obscurity, and their social or political content can only be understood with deep attention. The connection with nature is evident in most of Mina’s poems. The poet herself writes in an introduction to her selected work: “Every artist tries to play the instruments of the world in a certain way according to their personality. For me, nature is a vessel to pour my thoughts and desires into. The essence is the worldview of the poet."

Manouchehr Atashi writes about Mina's poetic view of the world around her: A sad look and in later stages, an exploring look. "The Broken Moon Sighs the Mountains" is among the brightest verses of our modern poetry. I consider these lines to be the silver and mysterious keys of poetry. The keys that unlock the great temples of poetic nature.

Faramarz Soleimani, in his book "More Productive than Spring", believes that poems of "The Moon in Aqueduct" can follow Forough Farrokhzad's muted voice without owing her anything. Abdolali Dastgheib writes in his book "Through the Lens of Critics": The poet of the collection "You Speak, the Words are Released in Me", presents mystical thoughts in contemporary language and somehow discovers the vitality, vibrancy and ecstasy of being alive through simple natural objects like flowers and plants, springs and rivers, plains and deserts and even in the horrible abysses of life. Parviz Hosseini writes in his book "The Magnificent Symphony of Poetry" (p. 62): The collections of Mina's poetry show the evolution of poetry in image making, brevity and simplicity. As if these poems each play an instrument and all together one can hear a magnificent symphony.

=== Selected poems ===
This way (p.135 The Cool of Mystery)

With our bones/ we wrote/ toiled/ dug roads,

And this way/ we paid our share of love.

With our bones/ we write/ and pay the share of traitors too.

Mystery (p.115 The Cool of Mystery)

Tell me/ what love is,

-“A smile on the old, dry tree of time”

Tell me/ what life is,

-“A bundle of endless sorrows”

Tell me/ what the secret of salvation is,

-“Slitting this bundle open/ and placing a smile on the old, dry tree of time”.
