= History of the University of Tehran =

The history of the University of Tehran goes back to the days of Dar ul-Funun and the Qajar era. The modern university as it is today was formally established in 1934 during the Pahlavi era.

== Foundations ==
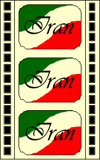
Click here for videoclip about University of Tehran.

Most faculties of the University of Tehran were created by integrating already existing higher education institutions such as Dar al-Funun.

The "Faculty of Medicine" for example, was particularly the successor to the Dar al-Funun Department of Medicine, established in 1851, which had become the School of Medicine (Madreseh-ye tebb) in 1919. Charles Oberling, a well-known French pathologist, was appointed as dean of the faculty in 1939. Oberling was instrumental in bringing the hospitals of Tehran under the direct control of the Faculty of Medicine of the university.

The "Faculty of Agriculture" as another example, was founded on the basis of three previously established schools. The first was the Mozaffar School of Agronomy (the first modern agricultural school in Iran) which was itself founded in 1900 under the direction of a Belgian agricultural expert named Dascher. The second was the Farmers School of Karaj, which was founded in 1918 under the direction of an Austrian by the name of Hans Schricker. The third was the School of Agronomy and Rural Industries (Madreseh-ye alee-e felahat va sanāye'-e rustāee).

The "Faculty of Fine Arts and Architecture" was founded by absorbing the School of Applied Arts and Crafts (Madreseh-ye sanāye' va honar), which had been founded by the famous painter Kamal-ol-molk, with the School of Architecture (Madreseh-ye alee-e me'mari). The first director of the college (or Honarkadeh as it came to be called) was Andre Godard, the French archaeologist and architect. The college was closely modeled on the French École des Beaux-Arts.

The "Faculty of Law and Political Science" was founded with the merger of the Tehran School of Political Sciences (Madreseh-ye olum-e siyasi) which itself had been founded in 1899, with the School of Law (Madreseh-ye alee-e hoquq), which had been established in 1918. Adolphe Perney (a French advisor of the Ministry) was appointed as dean, and the faculty was directed by a cadre of capable Iranian and Western academics such as Dehkhoda, Gild Brand (from Russia), Sayyed Mohammad Taddayon (a Minister), Julian Lafin (a Frenchman), and Mirza Javad Khan Ameri, among many others.

== Formal establishment ==
The first official step for the establishment of Tehran University occurred on 31 March 1931, when Minister of Court Abdolhossein Teymourtash wrote Isa Sedigh who was completing his doctoral dissertation at Columbia University in New York to inquire as to requirements for the establishment of a university in Tehran. Sedigh considered the letter an invitation to outline a comprehensive scheme for the establishment of a university.

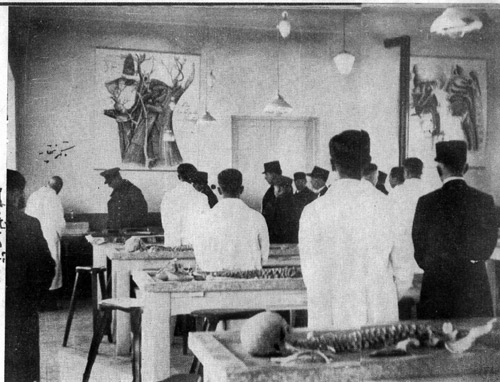
Faculty of Medicine commencement ceremony with Reza Shah.

In January 1933, during the cabinet meeting, the subject was brought up. Ali Asghar Hekmat, the acting minister of the Ministry of Education stated the following words there:

Of course, there is no doubt on the thriving state and the glory of the capital, but the only obvious deficiency is that this city has no "university". It is a pity that this city lags far behind other great countries of the world.

His words had a profound impact on everyone in the meeting, resulting in the acceptance of the proposal. Thus allocating an initial budget of 250,000 Tomans, the Ministry of Education was authorized to find a suitable land for the establishment of the university and take necessary measures to construct the building as soon as possible.

Ali Asghar Hekmat in collaboration and consultation with Andre Godard, a French skillful architect – who was serving the Ministry of Education as an engineer, promptly began looking for a suitable location for the university grounds. By the orders of Reza Shah, the compound of Jalaliyeh garden, located north of the then Tehran between Amirabad village and Tehran's northern trench, was selected. This garden full of orchards was founded circa 1880s during the final years of Naser al-Din Shah Qajar, by the order of Prince Jalal ed-Dowleh.

The master plan of the campus buildings was drawn up by French architects Roland Dubrulle and Maxime Siroux, Swiss architect Alexandre Moser, as well as Andre Godard, Nicolai Markov and Mohsen Foroughi. The influences of early 20th century modernist architecture are today readily visible on the main campus grounds of the university.

The University of Tehran officially inaugurated in 1934. The Amir-abad (North Karegar) campus was added in 1945 after American troops left the property as World War II was coming to an end.

The university admitted women as students for the first time in 1937.

== Further growth and expansion ==
After the 1940s, the university increasingly began moving away from the French influence and started modeling its structure and curricula after American universities. Many colleges and faculties were either assisted by academic institutions in the United States, or were directly led by American universities: The "Faculty of Agriculture" for example, was largely expanded with the assistance of Utah State University.

In 1954, the "Institute of Business Administration" (Mo'assaseh-ye olum-e edari) was established with the help of the University of Southern California, directed by Harry Marlow of USC, offering master's and PhD degrees. That institute is the current Tehran University Faculty of Management.

In 1958, the "Institute of Journalism" (Mo'asseseh-ye ruz-nameh negari) was founded with cooperation of James Wellard of the University of Virginia.

In 1965, a postdoctoral program of cytopathology was inaugurated with the assistance of Johns Hopkins University.

And in 1971, construction of a new building designed by Abdolaziz Farmanfarmayan was completed, which housed the university's main central library which today holds nearly 700,000 volumes, a large collection of Persian manuscripts, many of them unique, as well as 1800 periodicals from all over the world.

== Secession of the College of Medicine ==
In 1986, by legislation of the National Parliament, the university's oversized College of Medicine separated into the independent Tehran University of Medical Sciences (TUMS), coming under the new Ministry of Health and Medical Education. The university (TUMS) is currently Iran's most prestigious medical school with 13,000 students.

Tehran University of Medical Sciences, however, publishes all its scientific research under the name "University of Tehran" and continues to enjoy close relations with Tehran University's main campus.
