= List of circular cities =

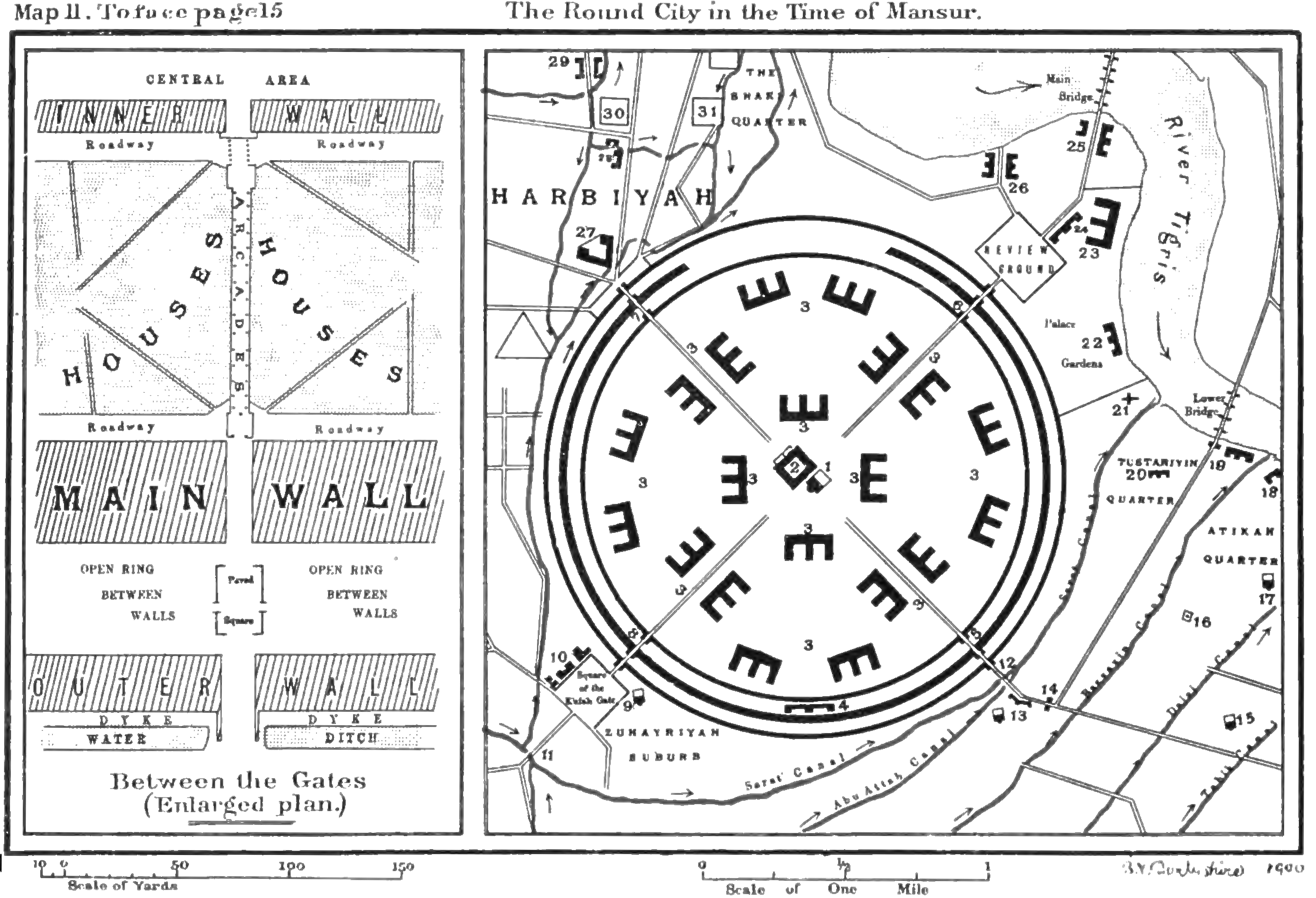
The Round City of Baghdad, reconstructed by Guy Le Strange (1900)

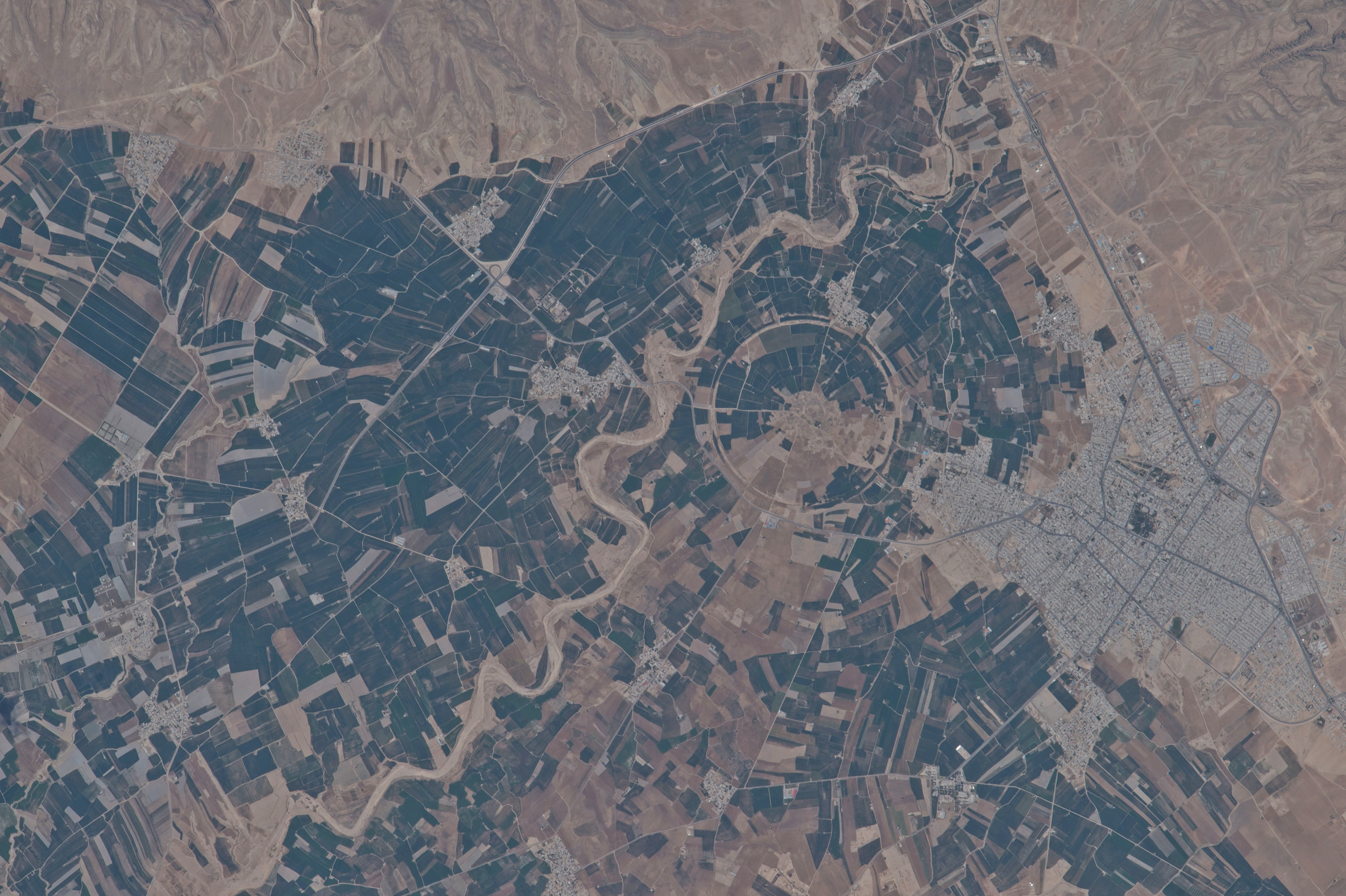
Aerial photo of the modern town of Firuzabad and the ancient circular city of Gor nearby

Several cities have been built around a circular pattern of roads. Historically these included ancient cities of Mesopotamia and Persia, but some 20th century US cities were built on this model.

== List of circular cities ==
List of cities with circular design
City/town	Establishment	Coordinates	Notes	Reference
Sagbat/Hagmatana	700 BC			
Sam'al	Hittite period			
Ctesiphon			Details are still under discussion. Circularity may be a result of natural growth of the city rather than design.	
Metropolis (Thessaly)	3rd and 2nd century BC		Early Western travelers reported that the fortifications surrounding the ancient city was completely circular.	
Hatra	3rd or 2nd century BC		The plan is round, but it lacks "a genuine geometrical concept".	
Gōr (old Firuzabad)	3rd century		The city plan was a perfect circle of 1,950 m diameter, divided into twenty sectors. The plan also featured a circular city center, with a tower at its very center.	
Veh-Ardashir	3rd century		The circular wall is uncovered.	
Harran	Sasanian period			
Gay / Jay (Isfahan's twin city)				
Isfahan			The round city of Isfahan is not uncovered yet.	
Basra	630s		Known mostly from literature.	
Kufa	630s		Known mostly from literature.	
Baghdad	762		Known as "the round city of Baghdad".	
Darab	8th century		The uncovered imperfect circular perimeter is reportedly a defensive work built in the 8th century, and the city itself was triangular in design.	
Heraqla	790s			
The Venus Project	1955		In Miami, Jacques Fresco presented designs of a circular city.	
Rotonda West	1970	26°53′09″N 82°16′10″W		

== See also ==
- Iranian architecture#City design
