= Reza Karimi =

Reza Karimi may refer to:

- Reza Karimi (artist) (born 1946), Iranian born painter/artist living in New York
- Reza Karimi (footballer) (born 1998), Iranian footballer
- Reza Karimi (politician), Iranian politician and agricultural engineer
- Reza Mirkarimi (born 1967), Iranian film director
