= Squinch =

Architectural element used to support a dome

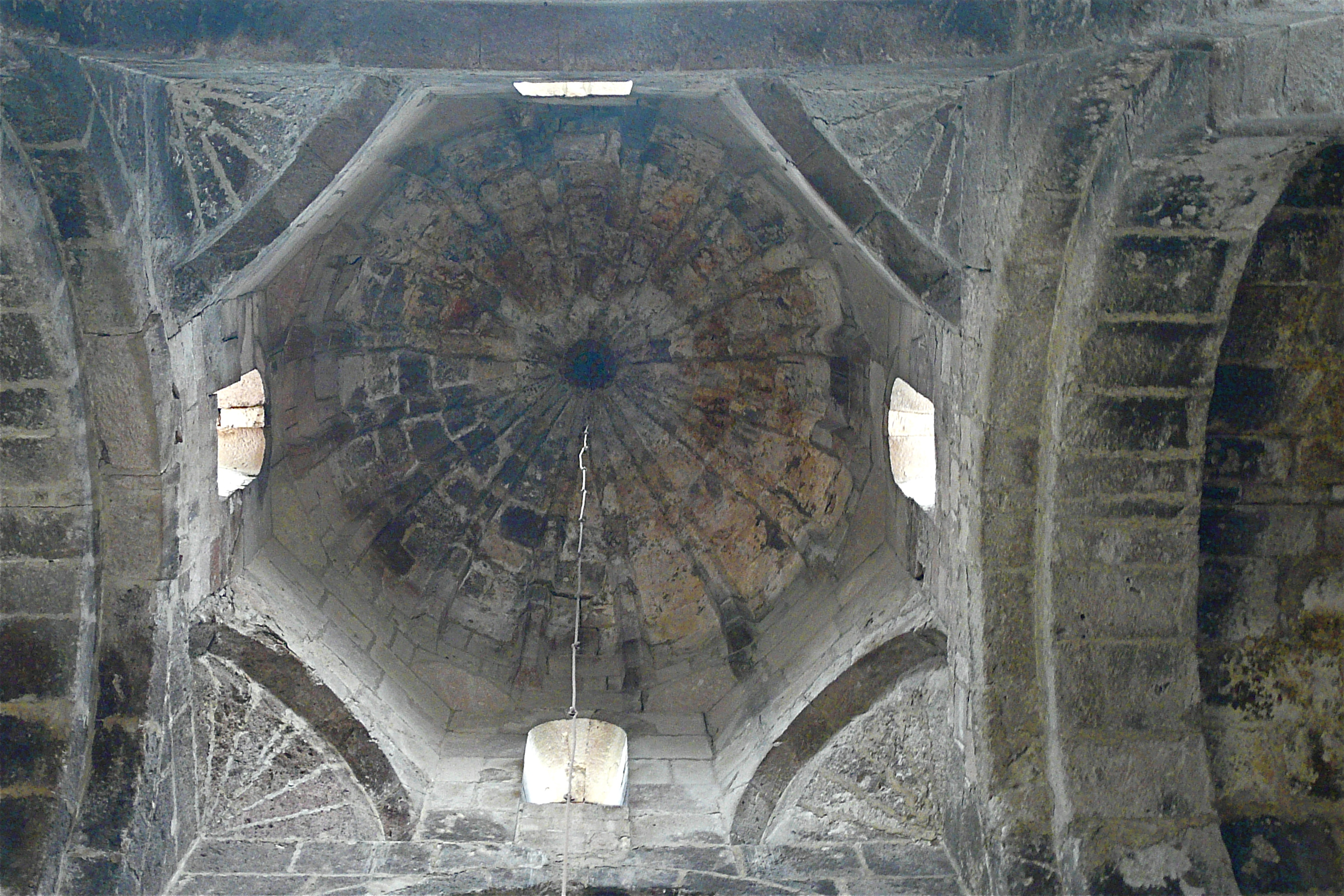
Squinches supporting a dome in Odzun Basilica, Armenia, early 8th century

A squinch is a structural element in architecture used to support the base of a circular or octagonal dome that surmounts a square-plan chamber. Squinches are placed to diagonally span each of the upper internal vertices (corners) where the walls meet. This placement distributes the load of the dome's weight, while also providing a visual bridge from circular to angular building elements. They have several forms.

Squinches originated in the Sasanian Empire of Ancient Persia, and have remained in use across Central and West Asia into modern times. From their Sassanid origin, they influenced Islamic architecture and were inherited by Georgian and Armenian building traditions. Domes built in the Roman-influenced world utilised separately-evolved construction methods, notably the pendentive, which performs a similar function.

== Form ==
Squinches are designed to evenly spread the load of a dome across the intersecting walls on which they rest, thus avoiding concentrating higher structural stress on smaller load-bearing areas. By bridging corners, they also visually transition an angular space (the corners), to a round or near-circular zone (the dome). Constructed from masonry, they have several forms. These include: a graduated series of stepped arches; a hollow, open half-cone, somewhat like half of a funnel laid horizontally – sometimes called a "trumpet arch"; or a small half-dome niche.

== History ==
From its pre-Islamic origin, the squinch developed into an influential structure for Islamic architecture. The architecture of Georgia and Armenia also inherited the form from the Sasanians: squinches were widely employed in buildings of all kinds in these regions. They are heavily featured in surviving or ruined medieval Christian churches of the region. An alternative approach to the structural problem of translating square space to round superstructure is the pendentive, much used in late Roman Empire and Byzantine architecture.

=== Western Asia ===
The dome chamber in the Palace of Ardashir, the Sasanian king, in Firuzabad, Iran, is the earliest surviving example of the use of the squinch. After the rise of Islam, it remained a feature of Islamic architecture, especially in Iran, and was often covered by corbelled stalactite-like structures known as muqarnas. It was used in West Asia and North Africa, and in eastern Romanesque architecture, although pendentives are more common in Byzantine architecture. The Hagia Sophia features both squinches and pendentives, in combination.

=== Western Europe ===
The feature spread to the Romanesque architecture of western Europe. The earliest squinch still extant in Europe is the 5th-century Baptistery of San Giovanni in Fonte, Naples. A later example is the 12th-century Norman church of San Cataldo, Palermo, in Sicily. This has three domes, each supported by four doubled squinches.

== Etymology ==
The word may possibly originate, the Oxford English Dictionary suggests, from the French word escoinson, meaning "from an angle", which became the English word "scuncheon" and then "scunch".

== Gallery ==
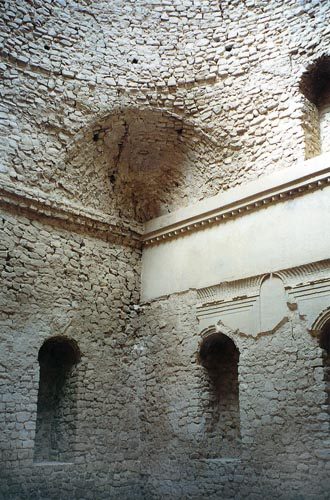
Conical squinch (or trumpet arch) in the Palace of Ardashir in Fars province, Iran

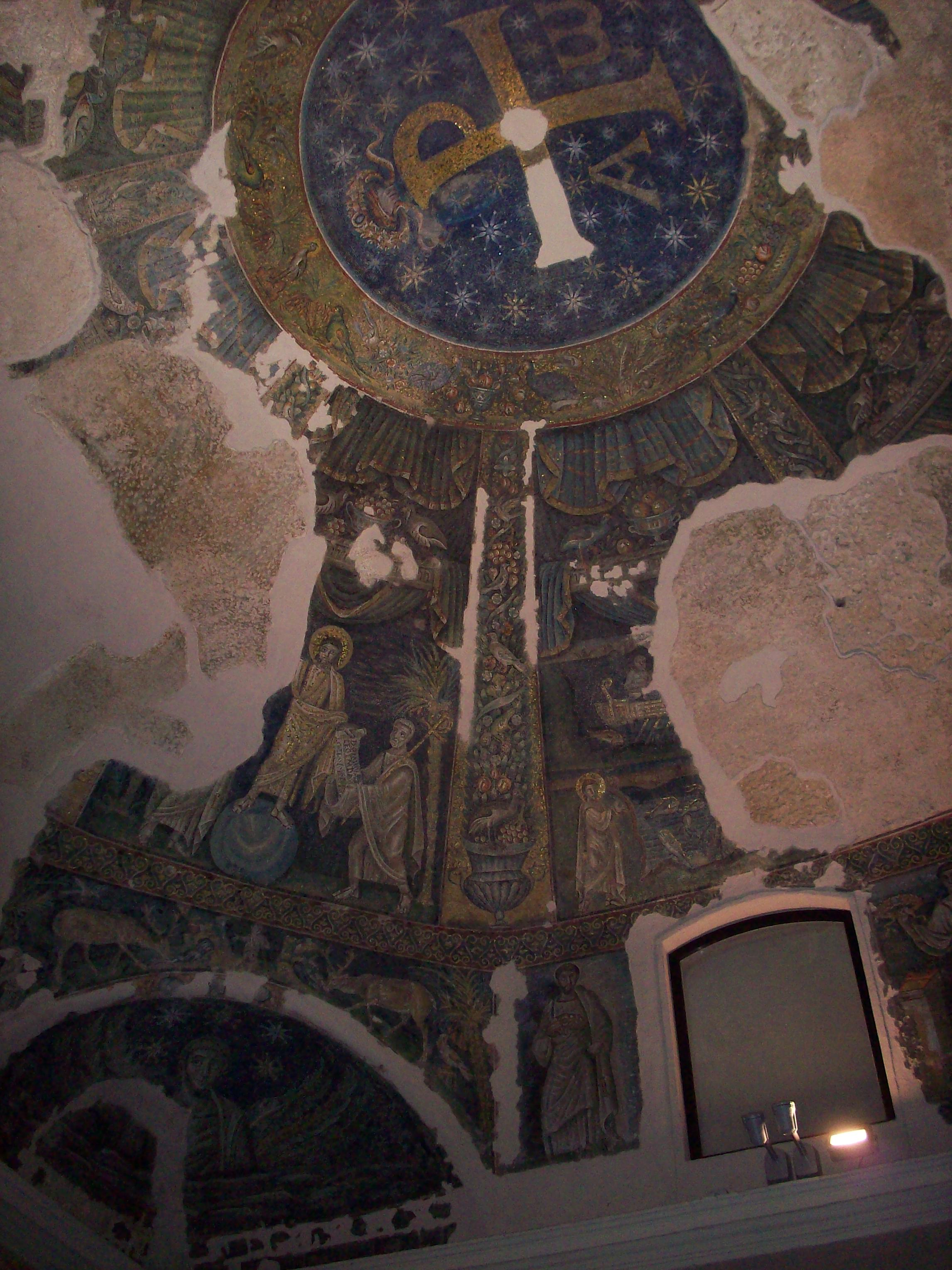
Squinch in the Baptistery of San Giovanni in Fonte, Italy

== See also ==
- Early and simple domes
- Persian domes
- Ancient Roman and Byzantine domes
- Splayed arch, an arch with conical intrados
