= Forough =

Forough (Persian: فروغ ) is a Persian feminine given name meaning brightness. People with that name include:

- Forough Farrokhzad (1934–1967), influential Iranian poet and film director
- Forough Abbasi (born 1993), Iranian alpine skier
- Forugh Karimi (born 1971), Afghan-Dutch psychiatrist and author

== See also ==
- Foroughi, a surname
- Forugh-e Javidan (disambiguation)
