= Palace of Ardashir =

Historice site in Iran

- کاخ اردشیر
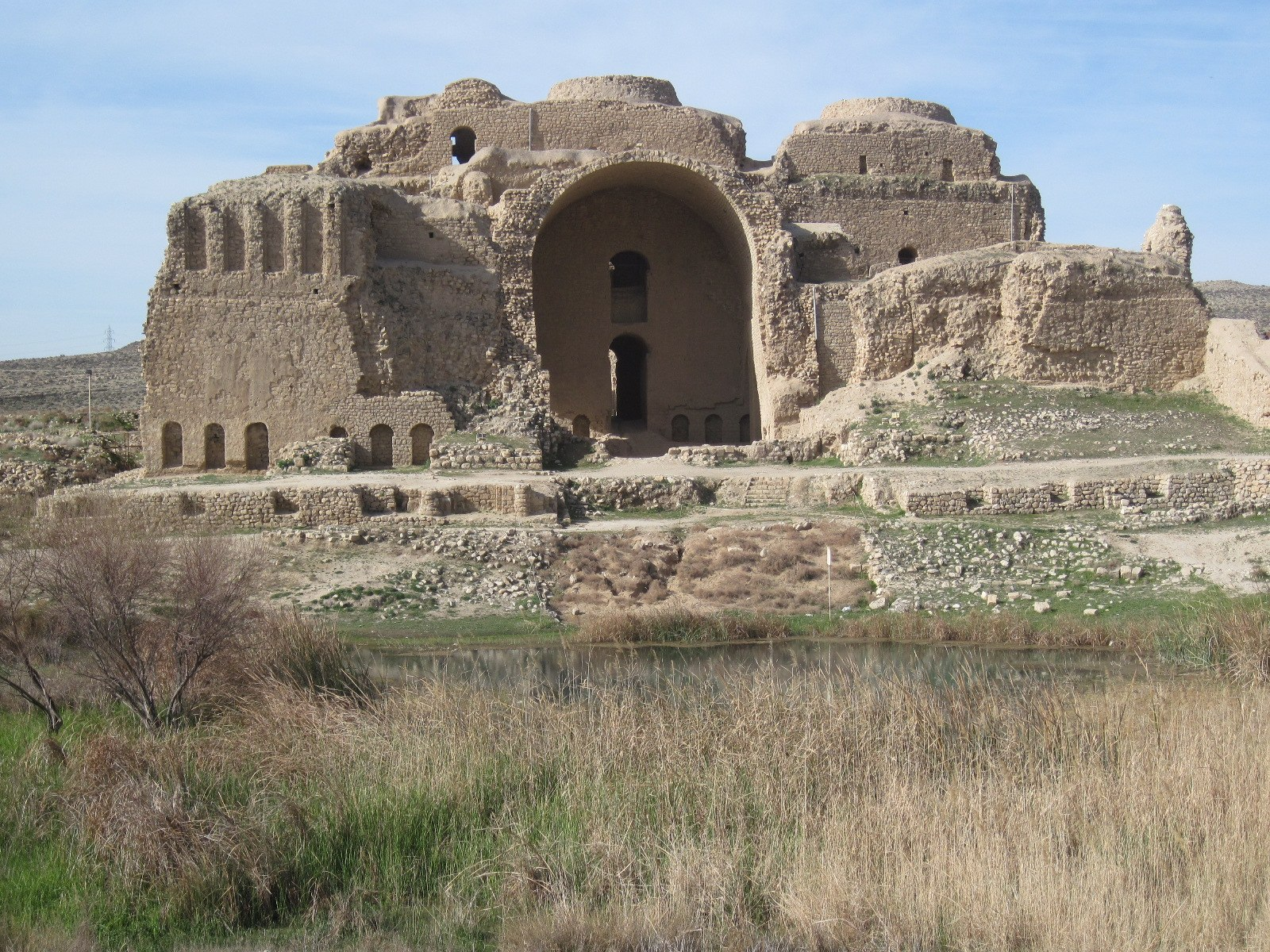
- Palace of Ardashir I

- Location within Continental Asia Location within Iran

General information
- Type: Castle
- Architectural style: Sasanian

Iran National Heritage List
- Official name: Palace of Ardashir
- Type: Palace
- Designated: 1932
- Reference no.: 89
- Conservation organization: Cultural Heritage, Handicrafts and Tourism Organization of Iran
- Location: Firuzabad, Iran
- Coordinates: 28°53′53″N 52°32′21″E

Sassanid Archaeological Landscape of Fars Region
UNESCO World Heritage Site
- Interactive map of Sassanid Archaeological Landscape of Fars Region
- Location: Iran
- Criteria: Cultural: (ii), (iii), (v)
- Reference: 1568
- Inscription: 2018 (42nd Session)
- Area: 639.3 ha (1,580 acres)
- Buffer zone: 12,715 ha (31,420 acres)

Palace of Ardashir Bābakān (Persian: کاخ اردشير بابکان, romanized: Kākh-e Ardeshīr-e Bābakān), also known as the Ātashkadeh (Persian: آتشکده, lit. 'Fire Temple'), is a castle located on the slopes of the mountain on which Qal'eh Dokhtar is situated.

Built in AD 224 by King Ardashir I of the Sasanian Empire, it is located two kilometers (1.2 miles) north of the ancient city of Gor, i.e. the old city of Artakhsher Khwarah/Khor Ardashir/Gor Adesheer (Glory of [king] Ardasher) in Pars, in ancient Persia (Iran). The ancient city where the palace is located, was renamed "Peroz" (lit. victorious) after Ardashir established the Sasanian Empire by overthrowing Ardavan, the last Parthian king. After the Arabian conquest, Peroz was called Firuz, and the name remained. The modern city of Firuzabad is hence, of important significance in Persian history and Sasanian archaeology, and is one of the eight designated UNESCO World Heritage Sites of the Sassanid Archaeological Landscape of Fars Region.

== Description ==
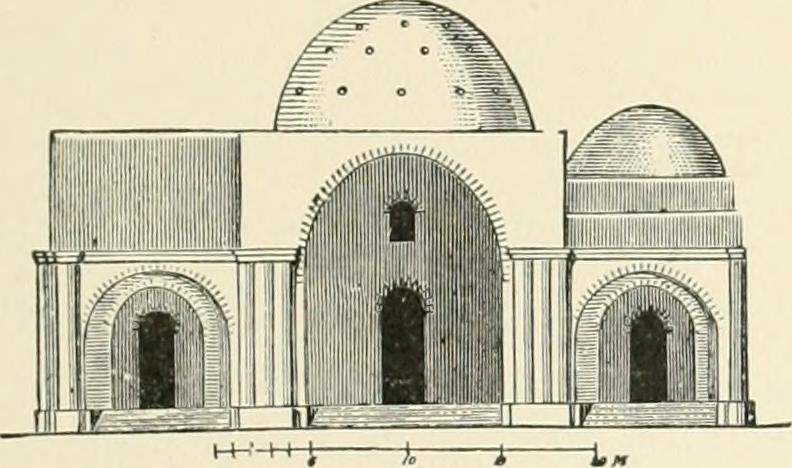
Exterior elevation, Palace of Ardashir, at Sarvestan, 1905

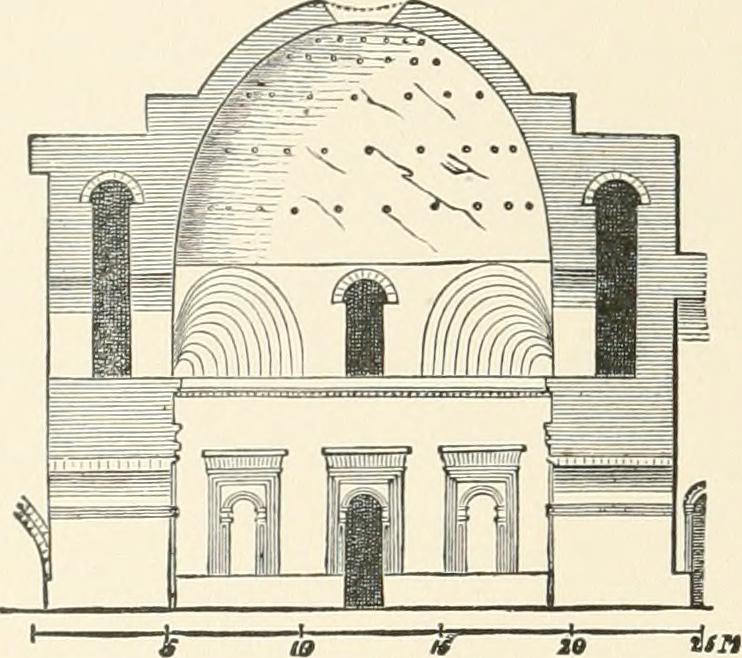
Interior elevation, Palace of Ardashir, 1905

The structure contains three domes, among other features, making it slightly larger and more magnificent than its predecessor, the nearby castle of Dezh Dokhtar. However, it seems that the compound was designed to display the royalty image of Ardashir I, rather than being a fortified structure for defense purposes. That is why perhaps it would be best to refer to the structure as a "palace" rather than a "castle", even though it has huge walls on the perimeters (twice as thick as Ghal'eh Dokhtar), and is a contained structure. From the architectural design, it seems the palace was more of a place of social gathering where guests would be introduced to the imperial throne.

What is particularly interesting about this palace is that its architectural design does not exactly fall into that of the Parthians or even Sassanian category; the design is a unique design particular to architects of Fars.

The palace was built next to a picturesque pond that was fed by a natural spring, perhaps in connection with the Persian goddess of water and growth, Anahita. The spring is thought to have fed a royal garden, in the same way that Cyrus had his garden (bustan) built at Pasargadae. The pond was tiled on its sides, surrounded by pavement for guests of the royal court to enjoy the evenings by.

The structure is 104 m (340 ft) by 55 m (180 ft). The iwan is 18 m (60 ft) high, although it has partially collapsed. The structure was built of local rocks and mortar with plasterwork on the insides. The style of the interior design is comparable to that of Tachara palace at Persepolis.

== In modern times ==
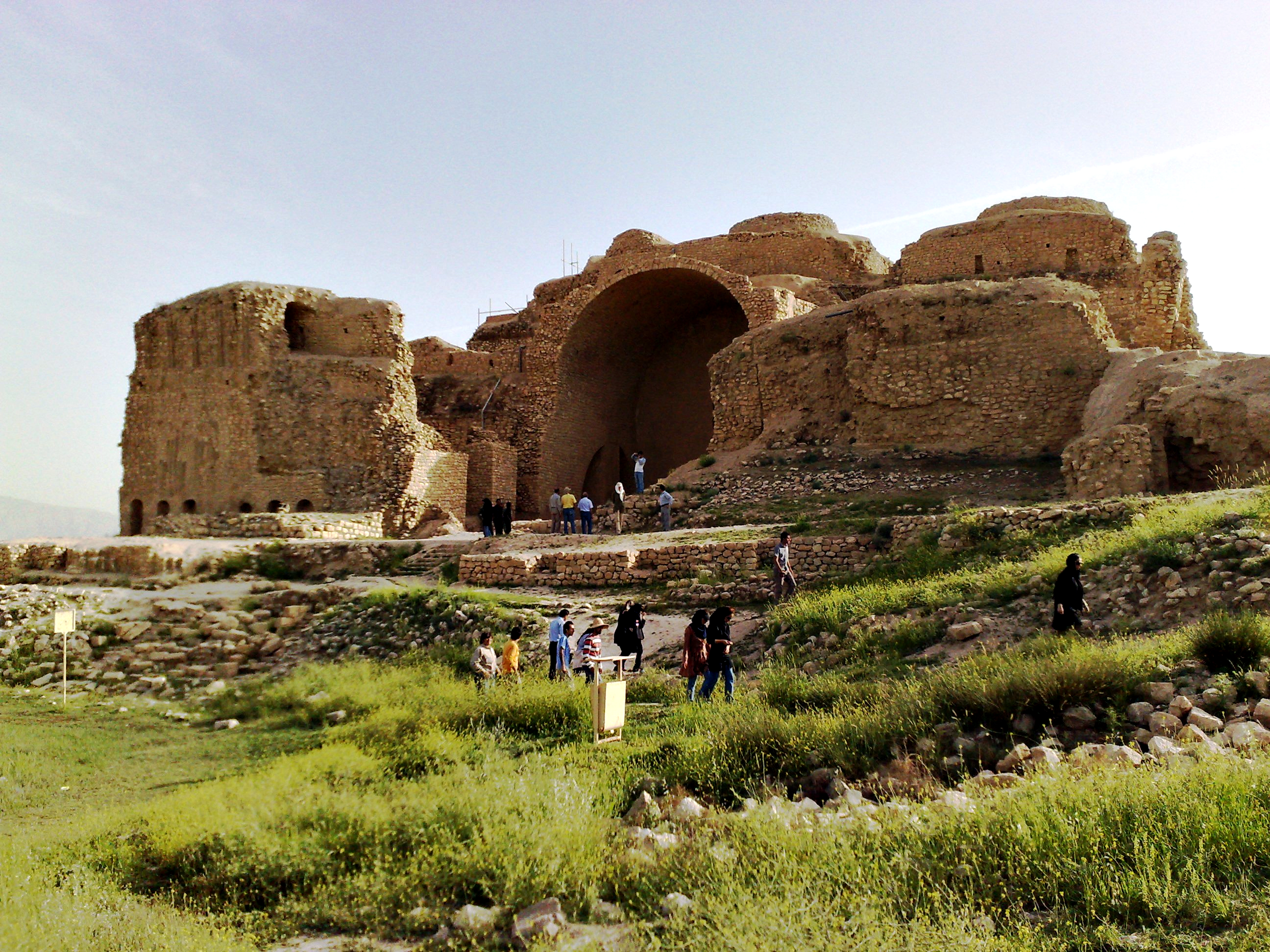
The Palace of Ardashir

Jane Dieulafoy visited the site with her husband, Marcel-Auguste Dieulafoy, and described it in La Perse, la Chaldée et la Susiane.

Robert Byron was there in February 1934, and wrote about his visit in The Road to Oxiana. Byron considered the Palace to include the prototype of the squinch. In his view, buildings such as St. Peter's Basilica and the Taj Mahal would not have existed without the squinch and the pendentive.

Iran has tentatively listed the Palace of Ardashir and other sites in and around Firouzabad as a possible UNESCO World Heritage Site since 1997.

== Gallery ==
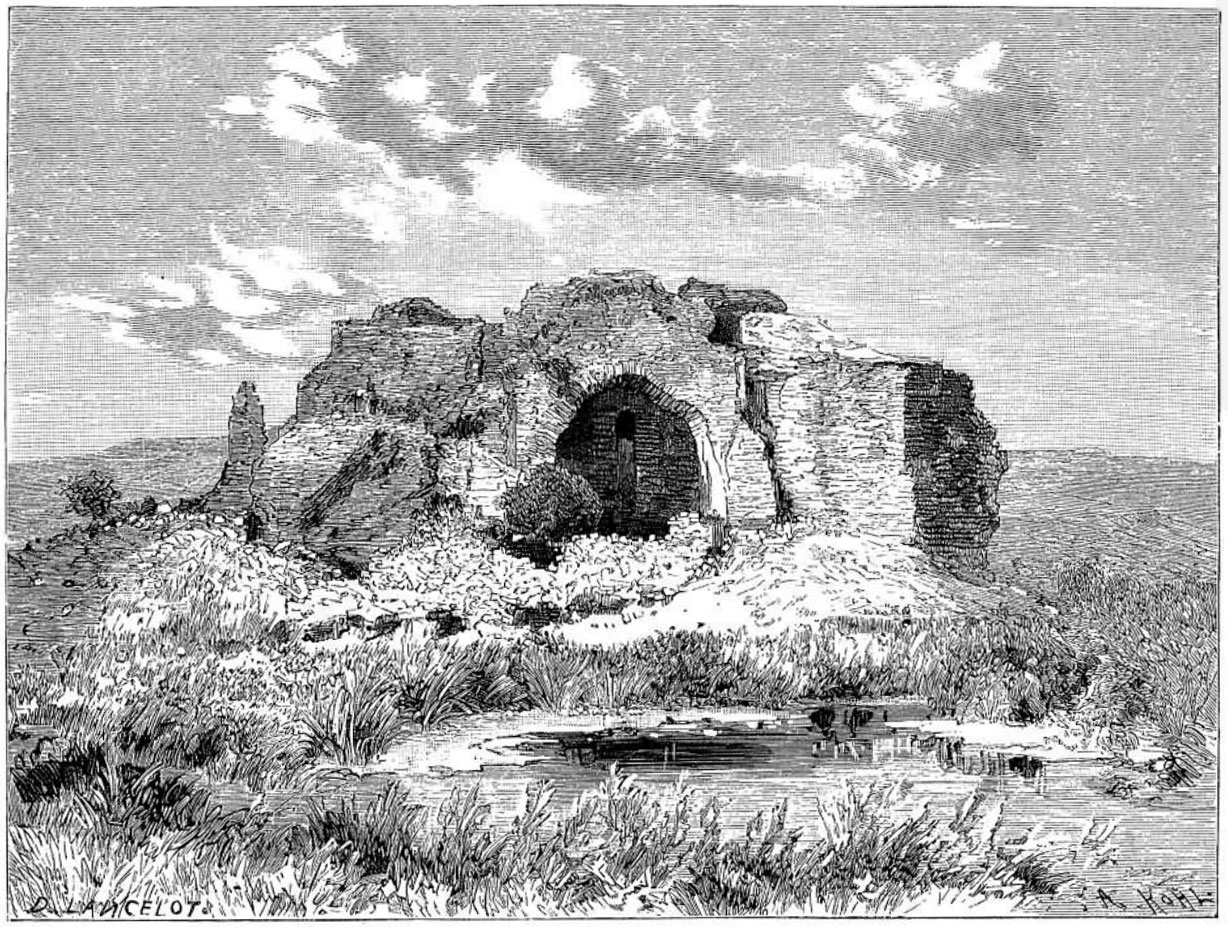
View of the palace from La Perse, la Chaldée et la Susiane, 1887

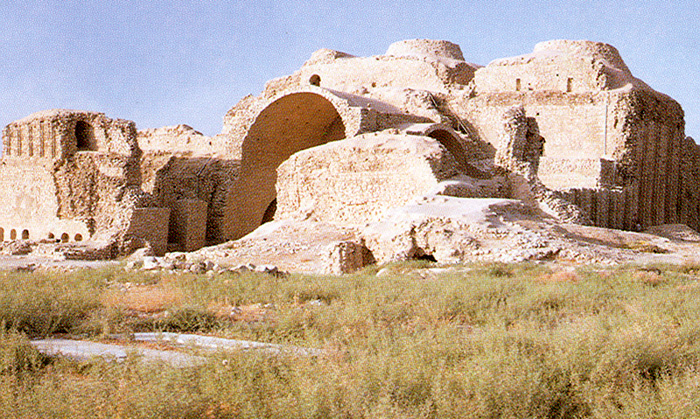
View from the north

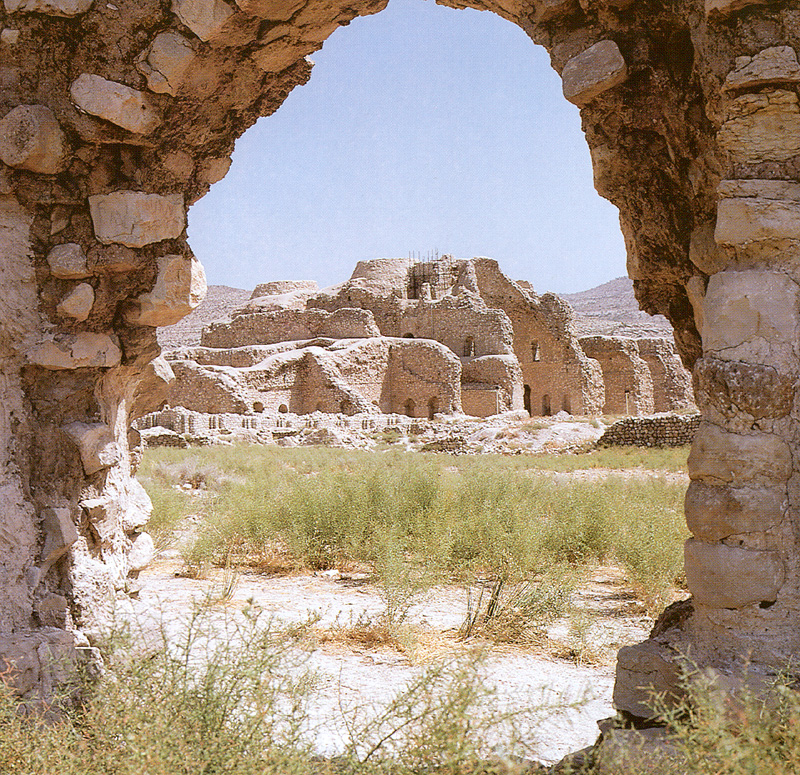
View from the south

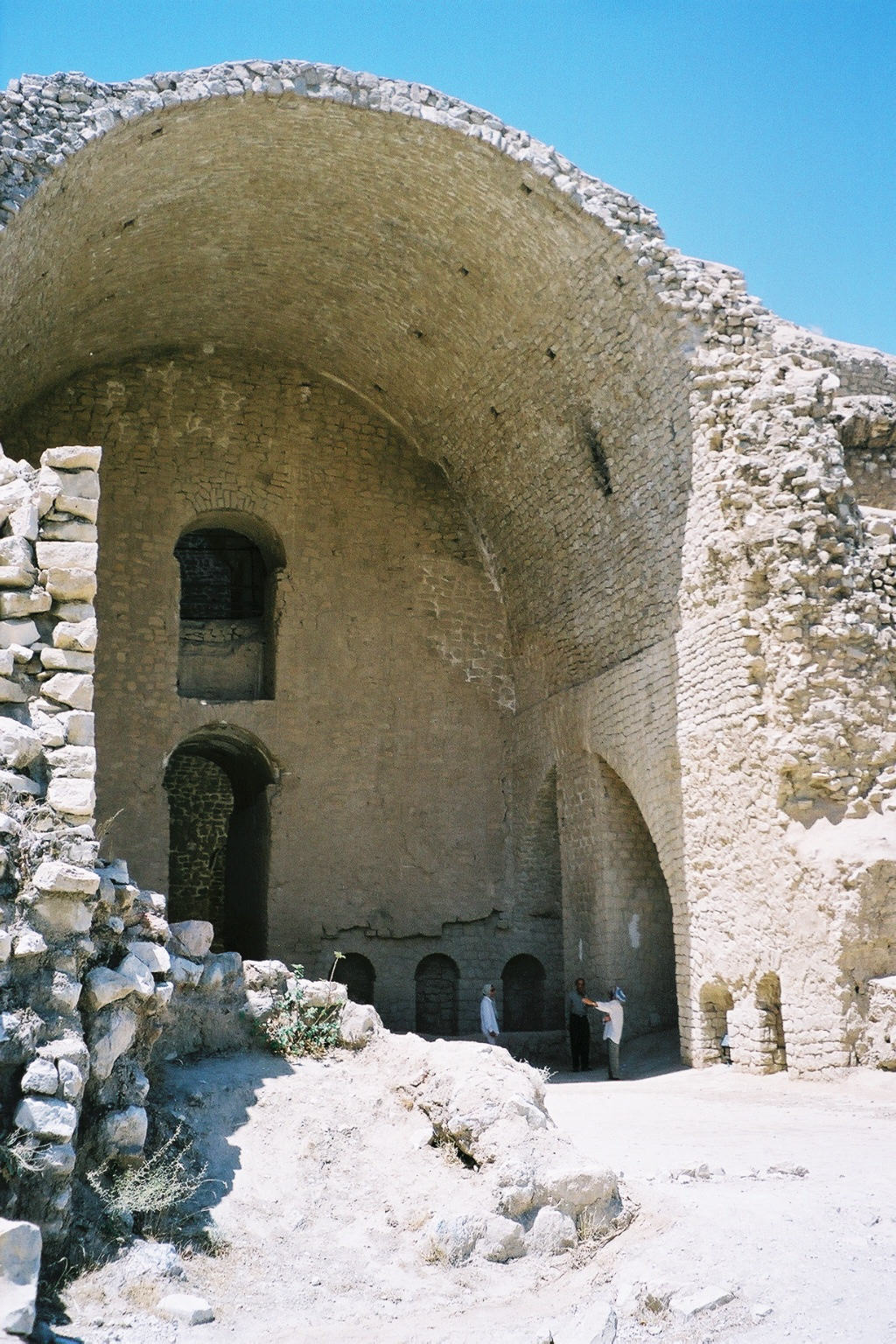
The iwan

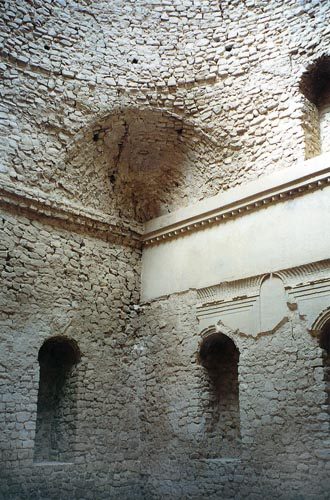
A squinch inside the palace

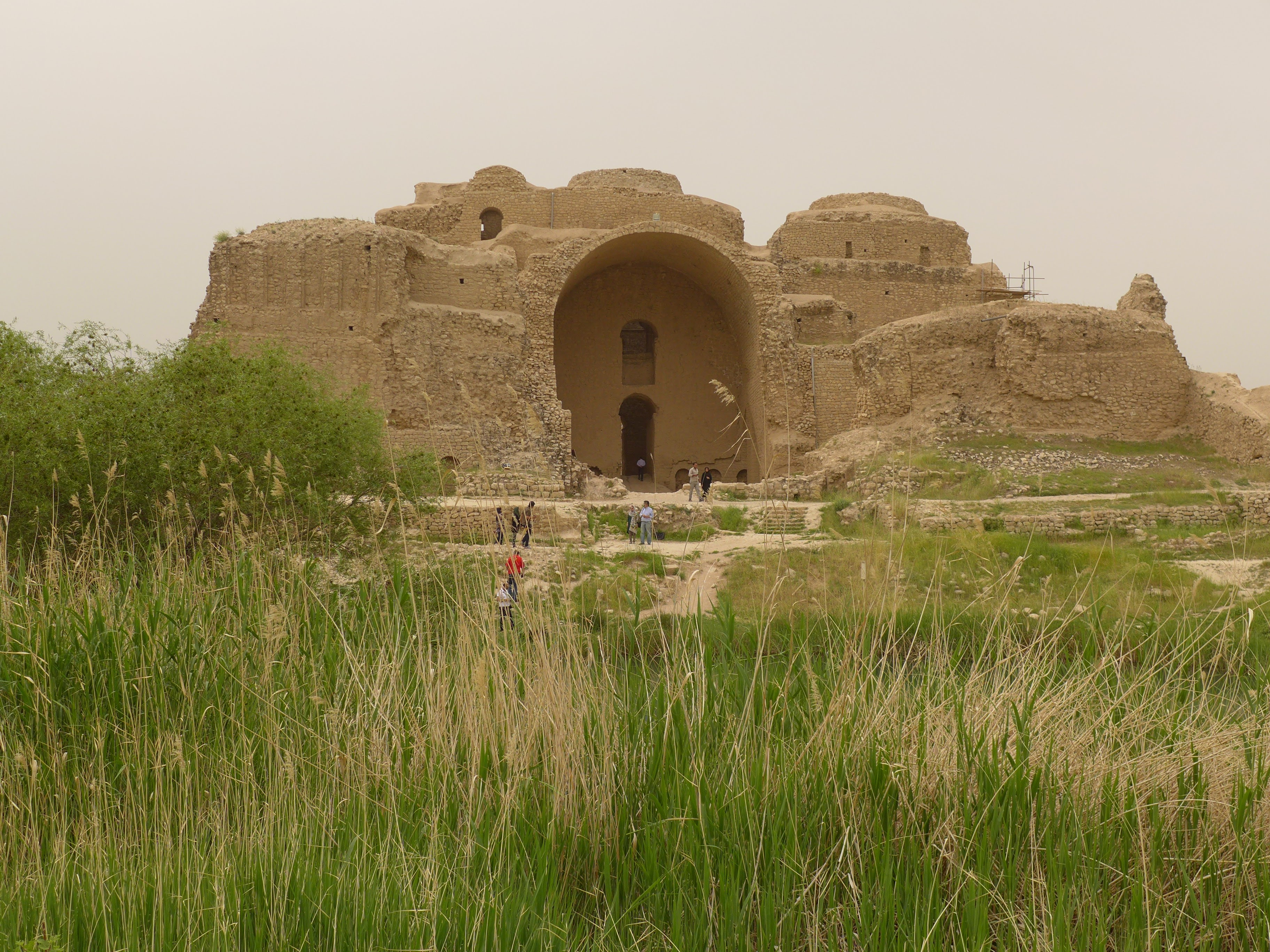
View from the east

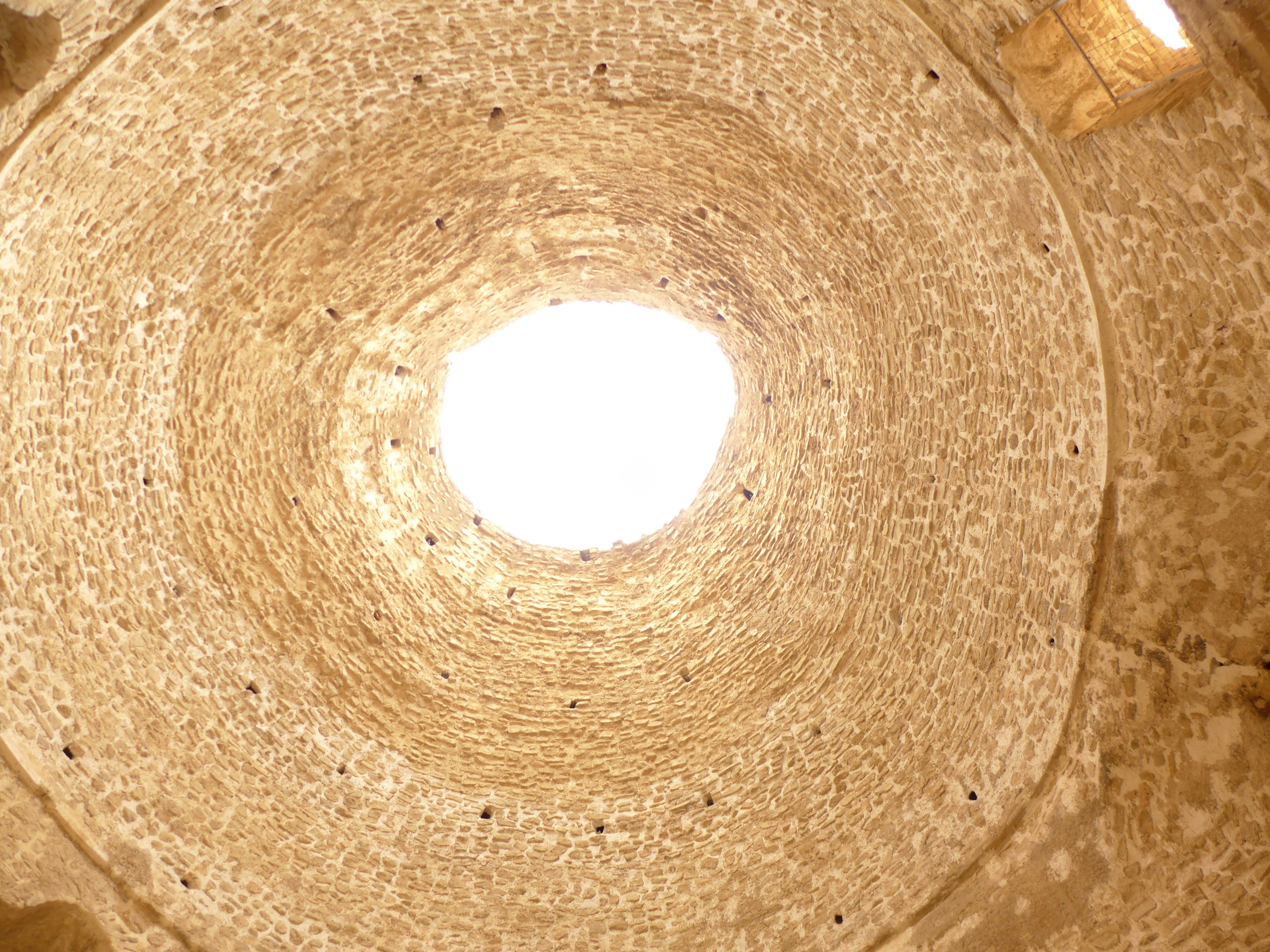
Ceiling

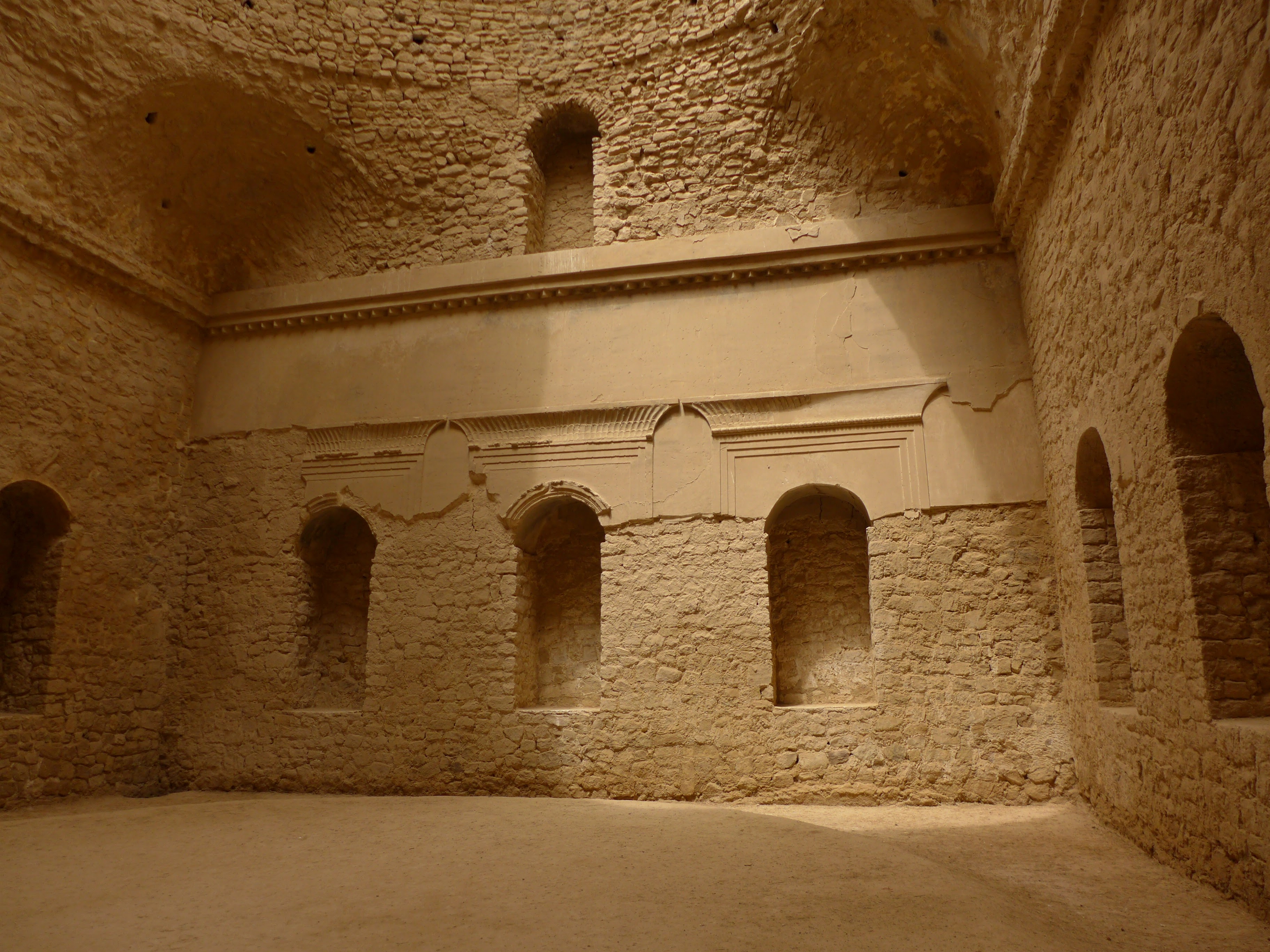
Interior of main chamber

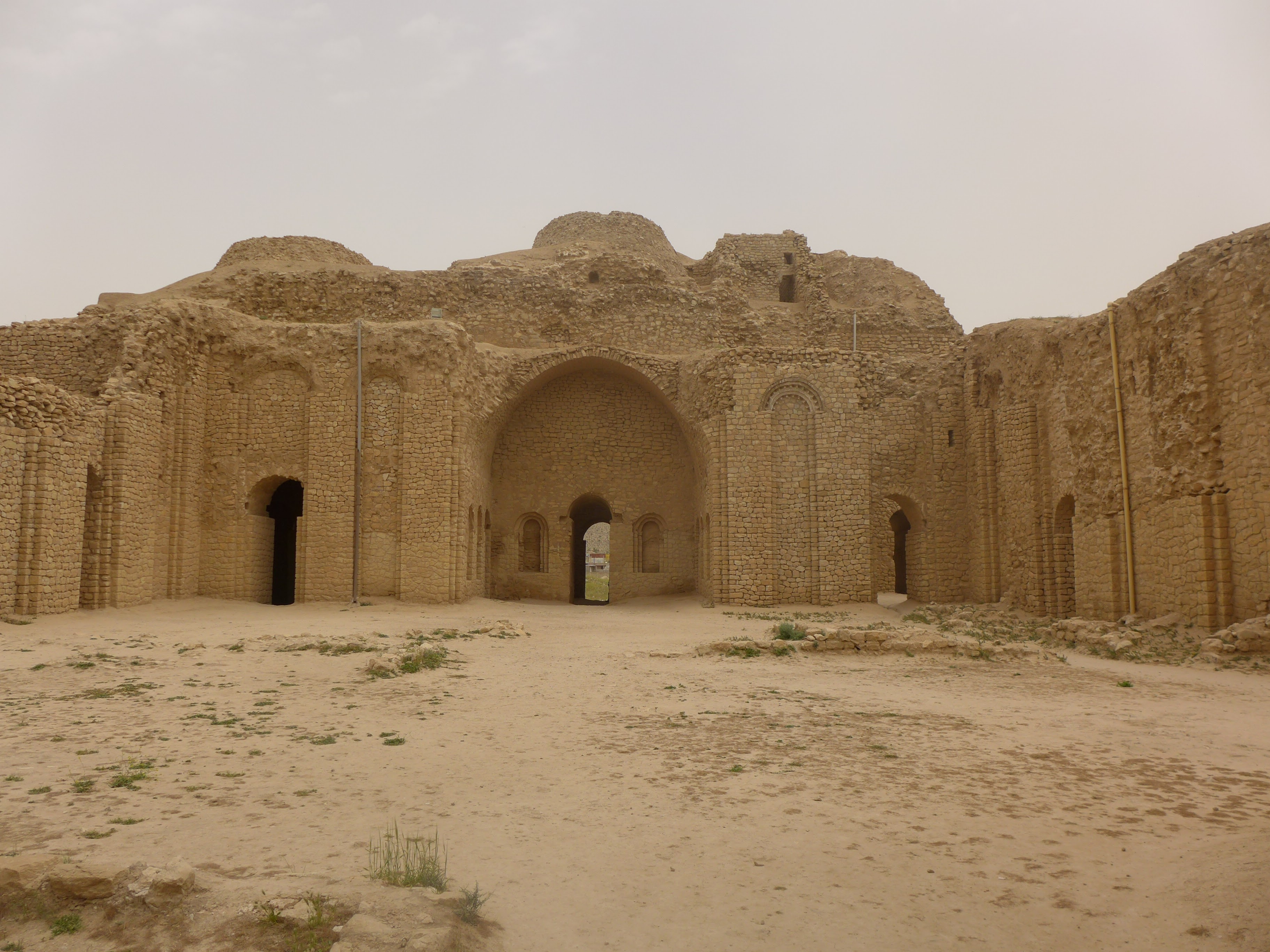
Main courtyard

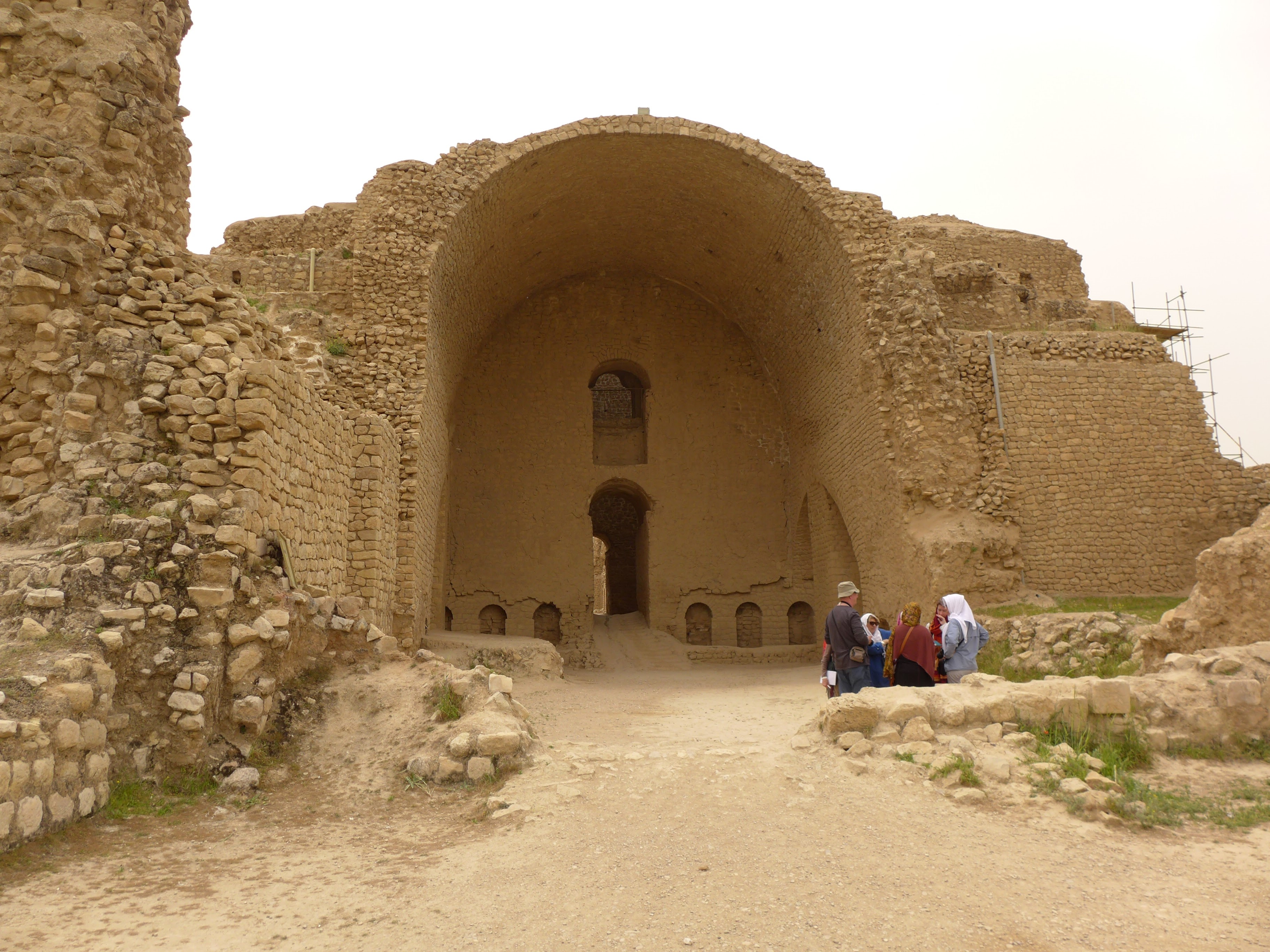
The iwan

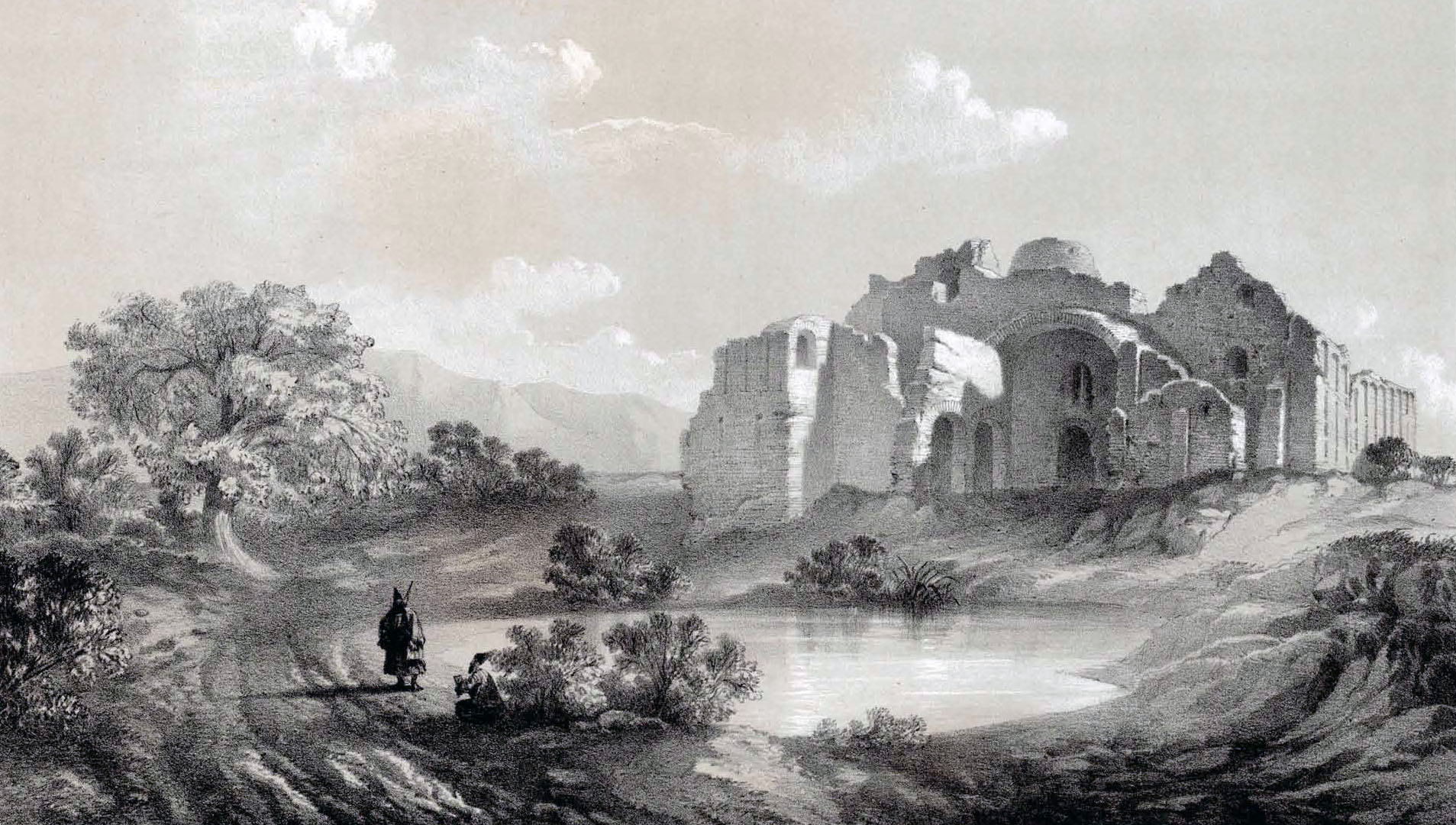
Palace of Ardashir by Eugène Flandin

== See also ==
- Anahita
- List of Iranian castles
- Persian domes
