= Minar (Firuzabad) =

Tower-like structure in Iran

- منار (Persian)
- Terbal, Minaret
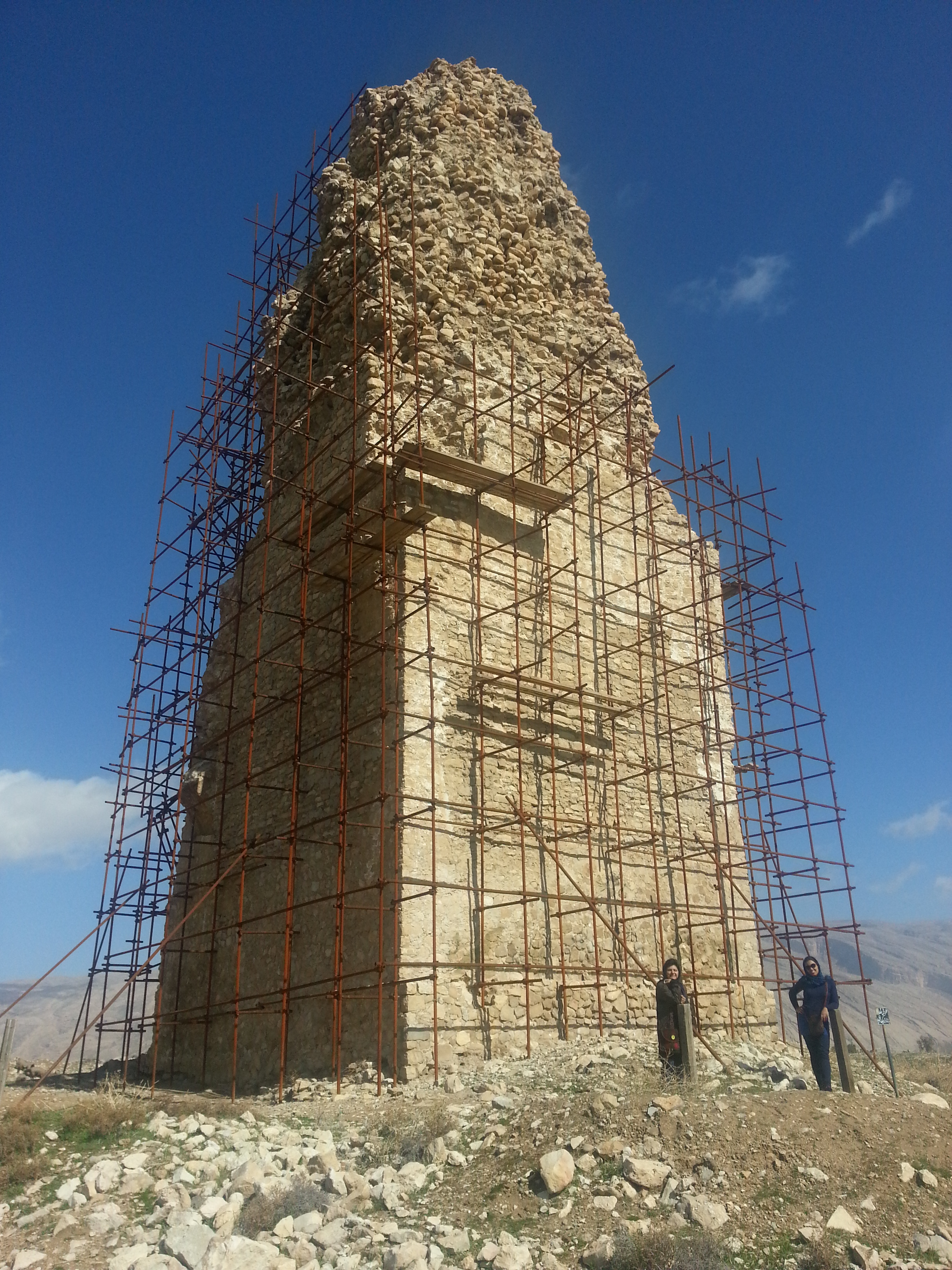
- The remaining core of the structure. The stairs and the dome are lost.

- Location within Iran
- 28°51′10.3″N 52°31′56.7″E
- Cultures: Sasanian Persia
- Location: Gōr, Ardashir-Khwarrah, Pars, Sasanian Empire (near modern Firuzabad, Fars province, Iran)

History
- Built by: Ardashir I

Site notes
- Material: granite-mortar-masonry
- Height: >30 m (98 ft)
- Length: 9 m (30 ft); 20 m (66 ft) if the ruined stairs and outer wall are considered
- Architectural style: Sasanian
- Condition: ruined

Iran National Heritage List
- Official name: Tower of Gur
- Type: Tower
- Designated: 1937
- Reference no.: 289
- Conservation organization: Cultural Heritage, Handicrafts and Tourism Organization of Iran

The Minar was a staged, tower-like structure built in the center of the Sasanian circular city of Gōr (modern Firuzabad, Iran). Several theories have been proposed for its purpose. Only the core of the structure remains today.

== Description and history ==
The structure is known as Minar (منار, literally "pillar") or Minaret (مناره) in New Persian, while the medieval Arabic-language Islamic sources referred to the structure as Terbal (طربال Ṭirbāl).

Similar structures, i.e., staged tower with an outside ramp, have been recorded by ancient historians, including a tower mentioned by Ammianus Marcellinus at the Nahar Malka (near the Sasanian capital Ctesiphon; he compared it to the Lighthouse of Alexandria), several towers at Pirisabora (al-Anbar) mentioned by Zosimus, and the Borsippa tower near Babylon. These in turn may have been based on the ziggurats of the ancient Near East.

Ardashir I's new city of Gor had a circular plan with the official buildings located at the centre of an inner circle 950 metres (3,120 ft) in radius. The tower-like structure of Terbal was located at the very centre of this circle. Together with Takht-e Neshin, these are the only structures of the city that are made of granite-mortar-masonry. According to Iranica, these two structures may have been confused in medieval Islamic sources, and it is unclear that the names Aywān kiyākhurra (ایوان کیاخوره) (Istakhri), Gunbad-i Kīrmān (or Gīrmān; گنبد گیرمان) and Īrān Garda/Girda (ایران گرده) (Ibn al-Balkhi) mentioned in these sources refer to which structure. Terbal was a 9 metres (30 ft) square structure with more than 30 metres (98 ft) high and spiral in design. It was the core of a stair-tower, and was compared by Ibn Hawqal to a similar edifice at Balkh (a reference to a Buddhist stupa, or possibly a ziggurat). With the width of the destroyed stairs and outer walls added, its actual width is estimated to be about 20 metres (66 ft). The remaining structure is hollow, according to the Qajar period writer Forsat-od-Dowleh Shirazi. Ernst Herzfeld (1907) had described it as a tower of a square ground plan with a spiral outer ramp. According to Dieulafoy (in his L'Art Antique de la Perse), who had examined the structure, it was "composed above the platform, of four stages ... Each stage is square and recedes from the preceding one by a space equal to 1/10 of the base".

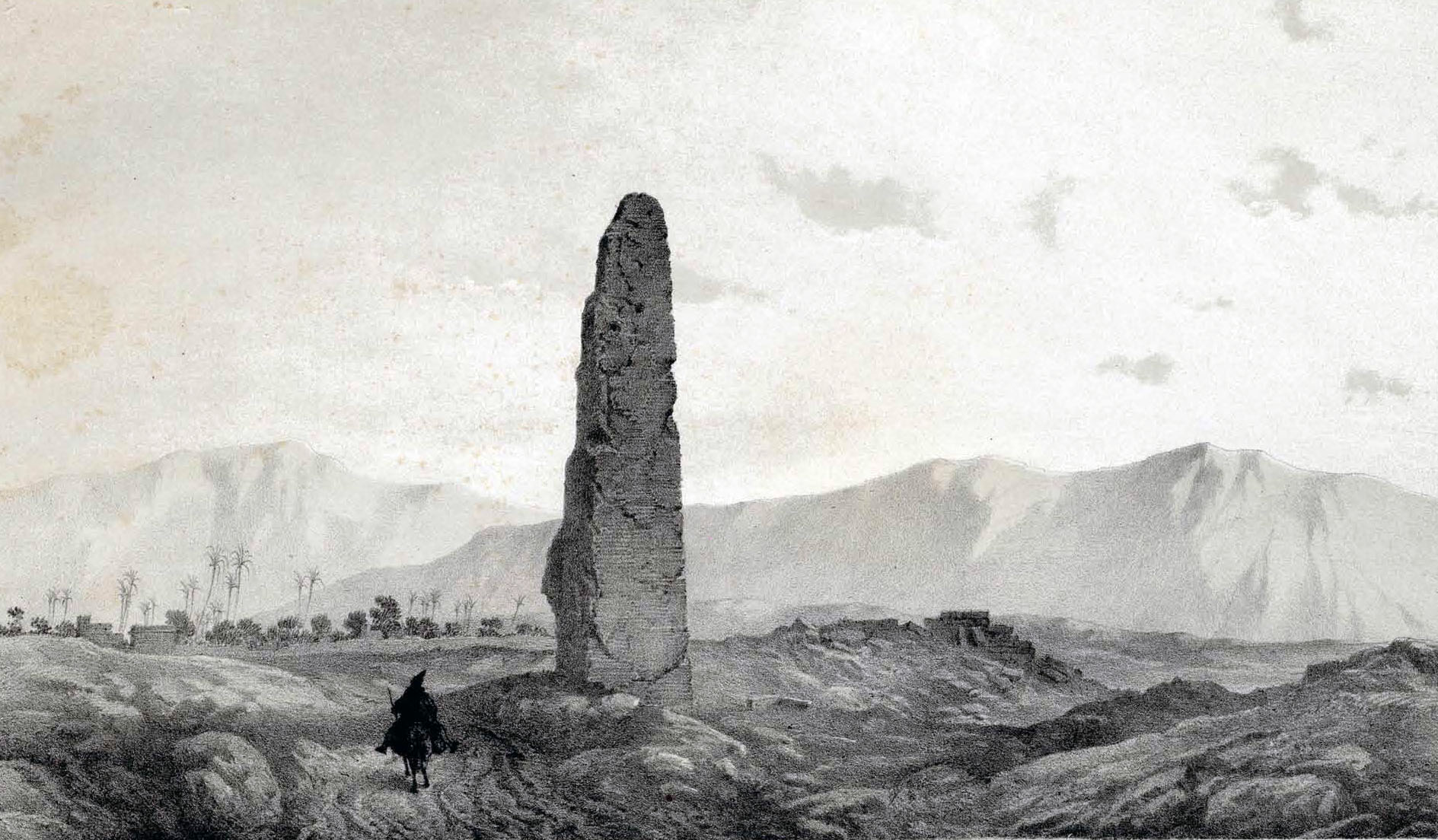
Drawing by Eugène Flandin, who called the structure "the Fire temple (Ateshgah) of Firuzabad"

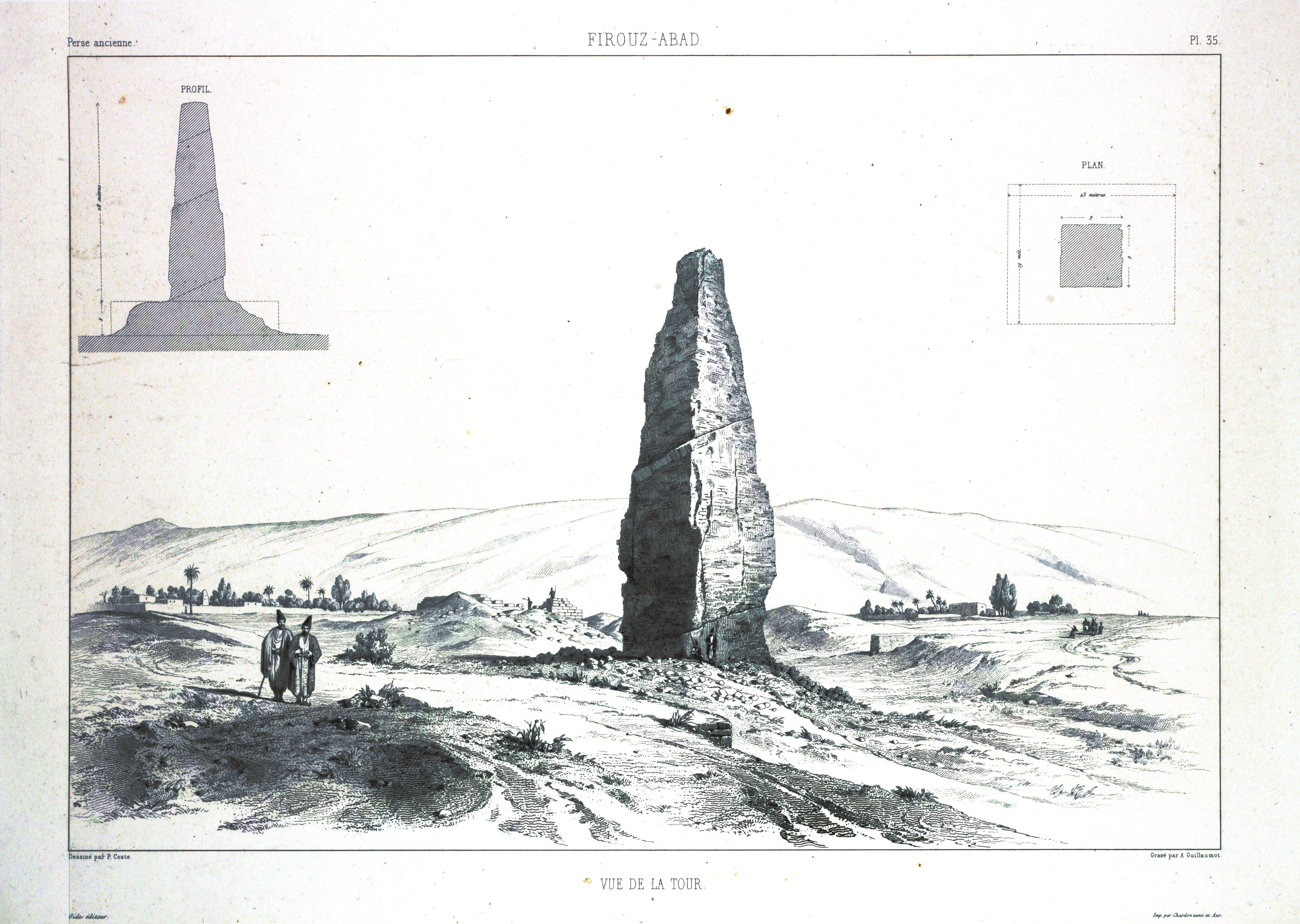
Drawing by Pascal Coste, which contains further details

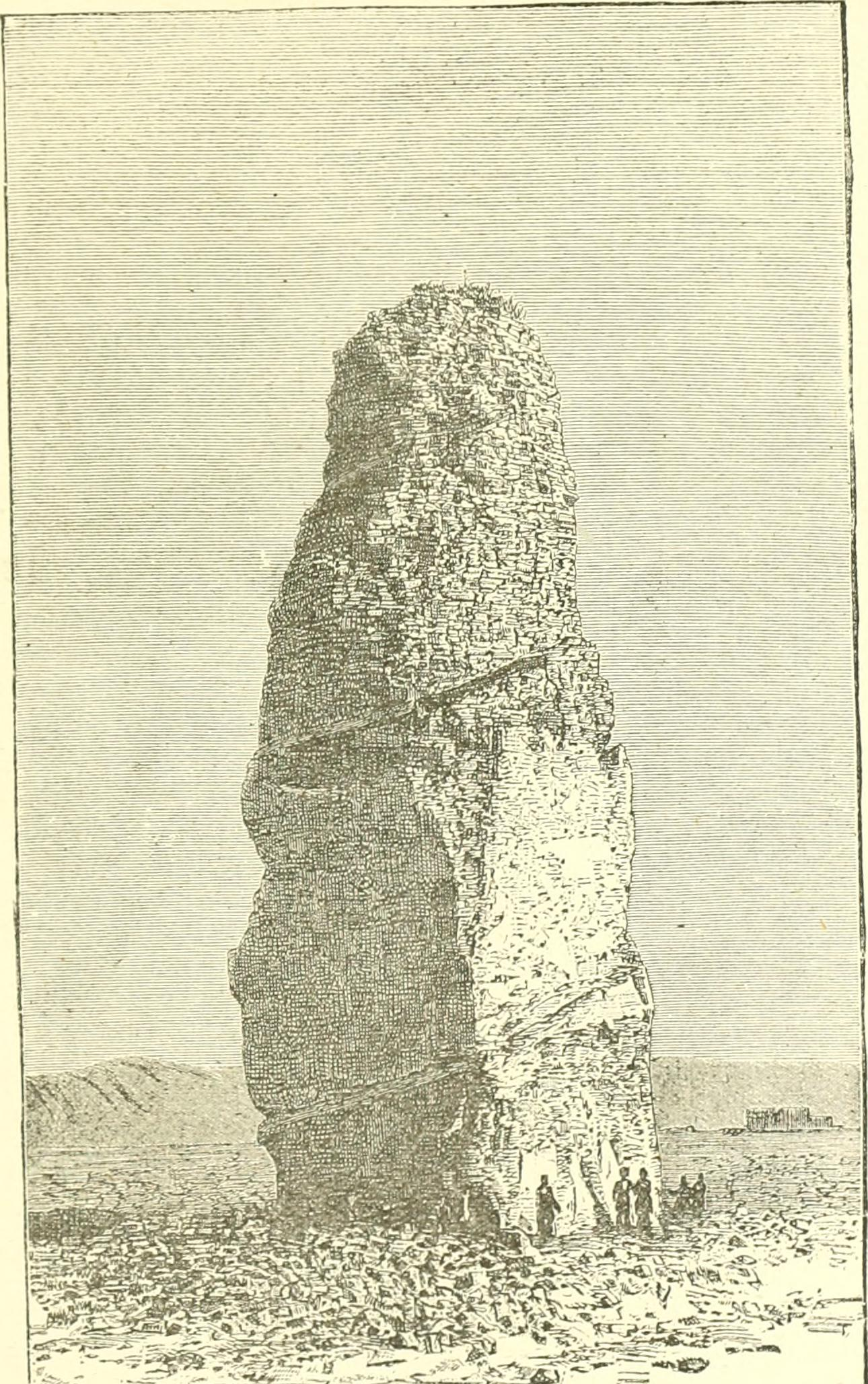
A drawing of the Minar with traces of the outer stairs apparent

== Purpose ==
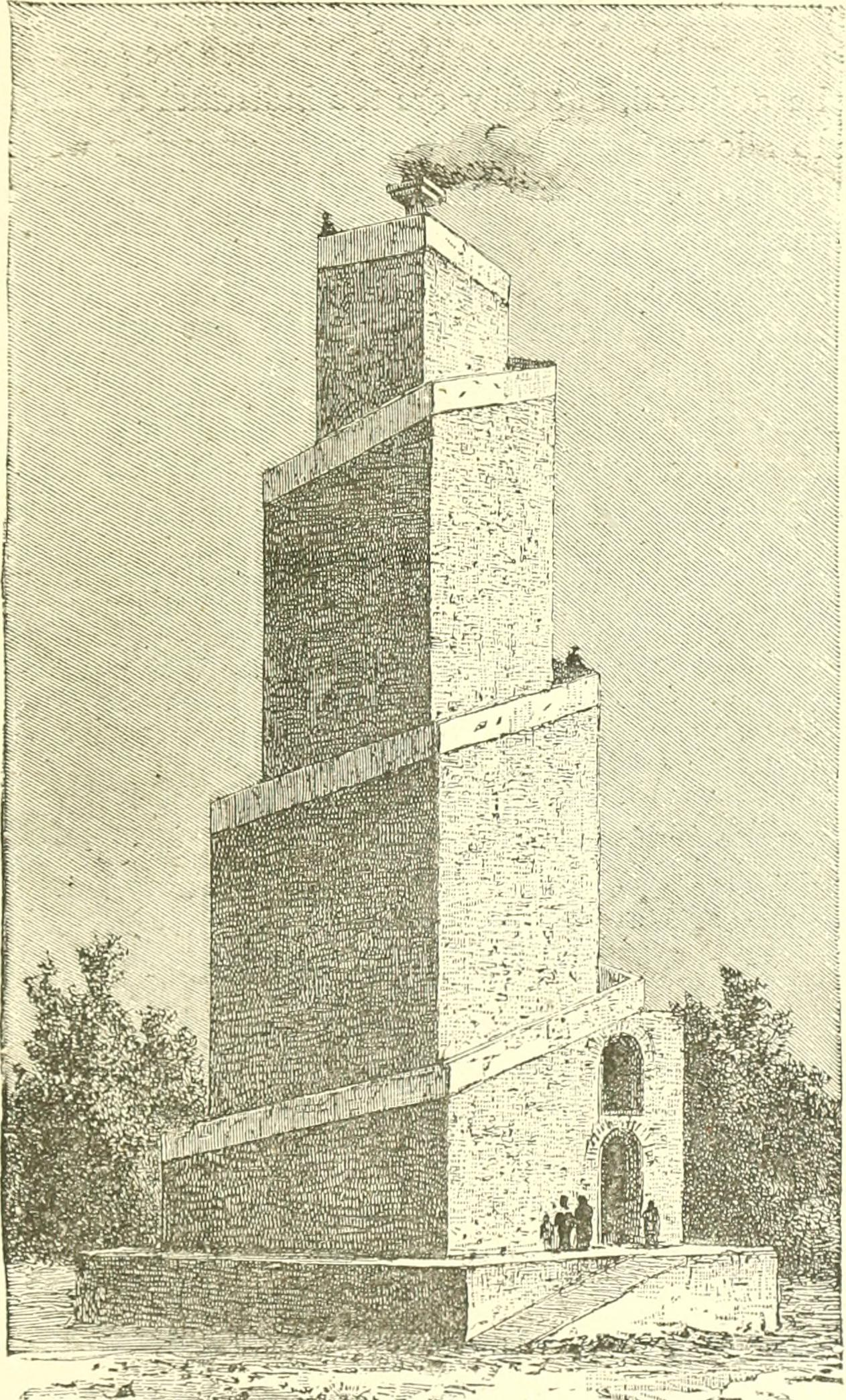
An 1889 artistic impression of the Minar as a fire temple, with the outer stairs reconstructed and the Holy Fire (atar) at its top

Among Western orientalists and travellers, the structure was first observed by Eugène Flandin and Pascal Coste, who noted its uniqueness in Iranian architecture. Prior to Ernst Herzfeld studies of the structure, Terbal was mistakenly thought to be a descendant of the ziggurat, while some thought it is a fire temple, with the Holy Fire (Atar) being put at its top to avoid contamination with dust.

It is hypothesised that the structure may have been part of a government building and symbolised the divine and centralist kingship introduced by Ardashir I. It may have had practical military and civil uses as well, as the tower provided visual contact with some fortifications in the area, and/or may have been used as an observation tower to survey activities during the implementation of the planned scheme of the new city of Gor and the plain. In fact, this grand scheme was centred in Terbal and continued the concentric and radiant pattern of the town, with traces of canals, paths, walls and field borders found up to 10 km distant from this central tower.

According to a newer study, the structure, as also described in medieval sources, may have functioned as a water tower, in such a way that water from nearby elevated sources would flow through tubes and Terbal's hollow core towards its dome, and from there it would be flowed to another tube to flow elsewhere in the town. It is argued that it was not the only purpose of the structure, but it was also part of a temple of Anahita, the divinity of the Waters (aban).

== Influence ==
It is thought that the Terbal was the architectural predecessor of the unique minaret (known as the malwiya) of Great Mosque of Samarra in Iraq, which was built in the Abbasid period. The minaret itself inspired that of the Mosque of Ibn Tulun in Cairo, Egypt, and recently Philip Johnson's design for the 1976 Chapel of Thanksgiving at Thanks-Giving Square in Dallas, Texas.

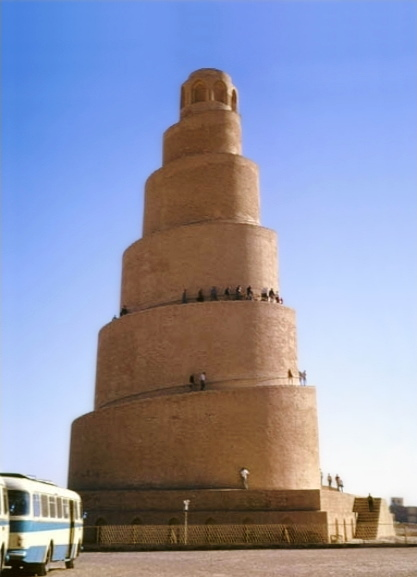
Minaret (the malwiya) of Great Mosque of Samarra, Iraq

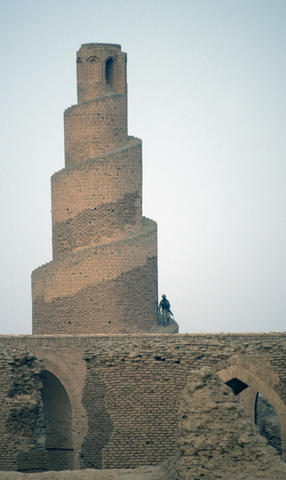
Minaret of Abu Dulaf Mosque, also in Samarra, Iraq

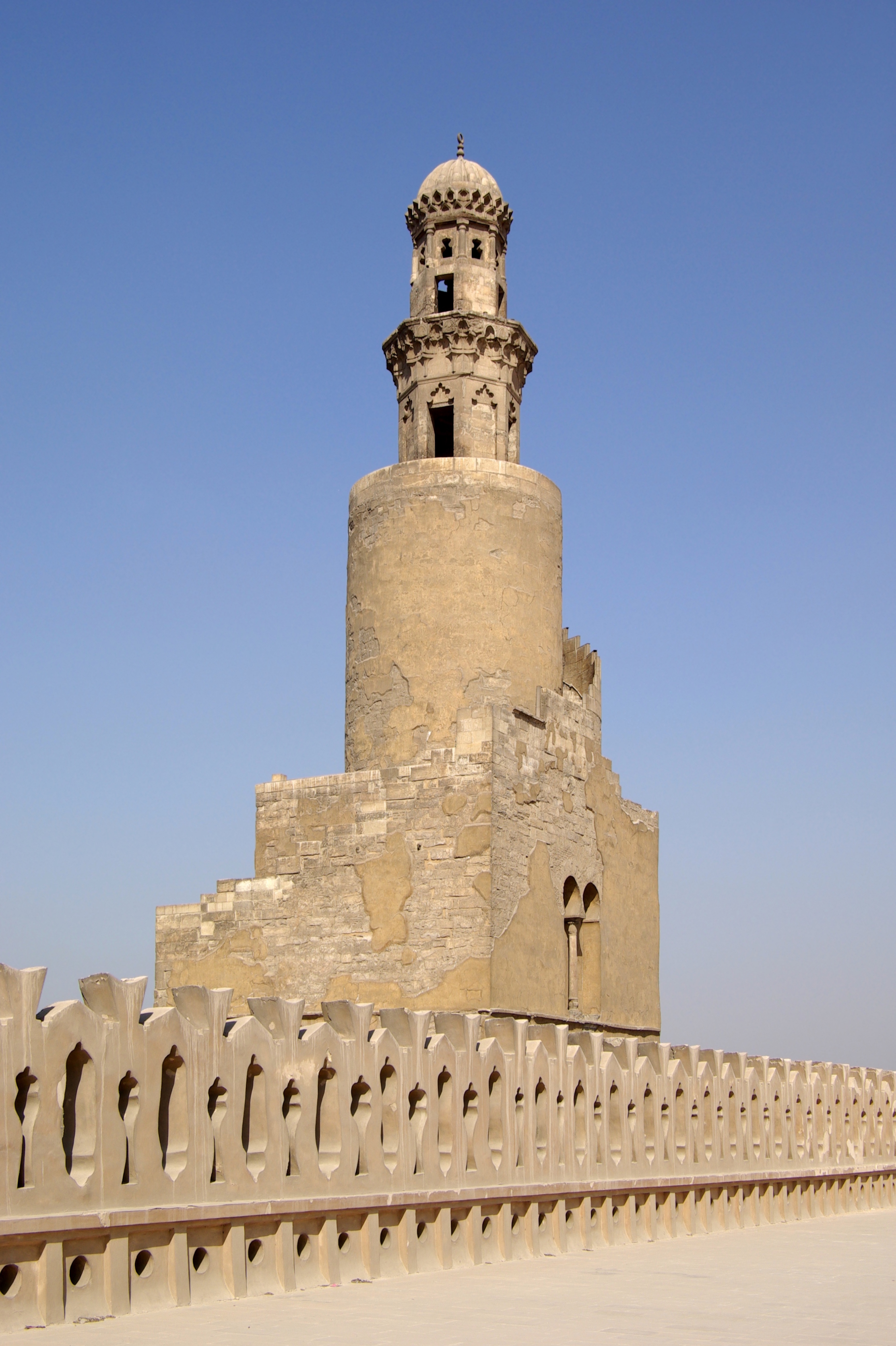
Minaret of the Mosque of Ibn Tulun, Egypt, inspired by the malwiya

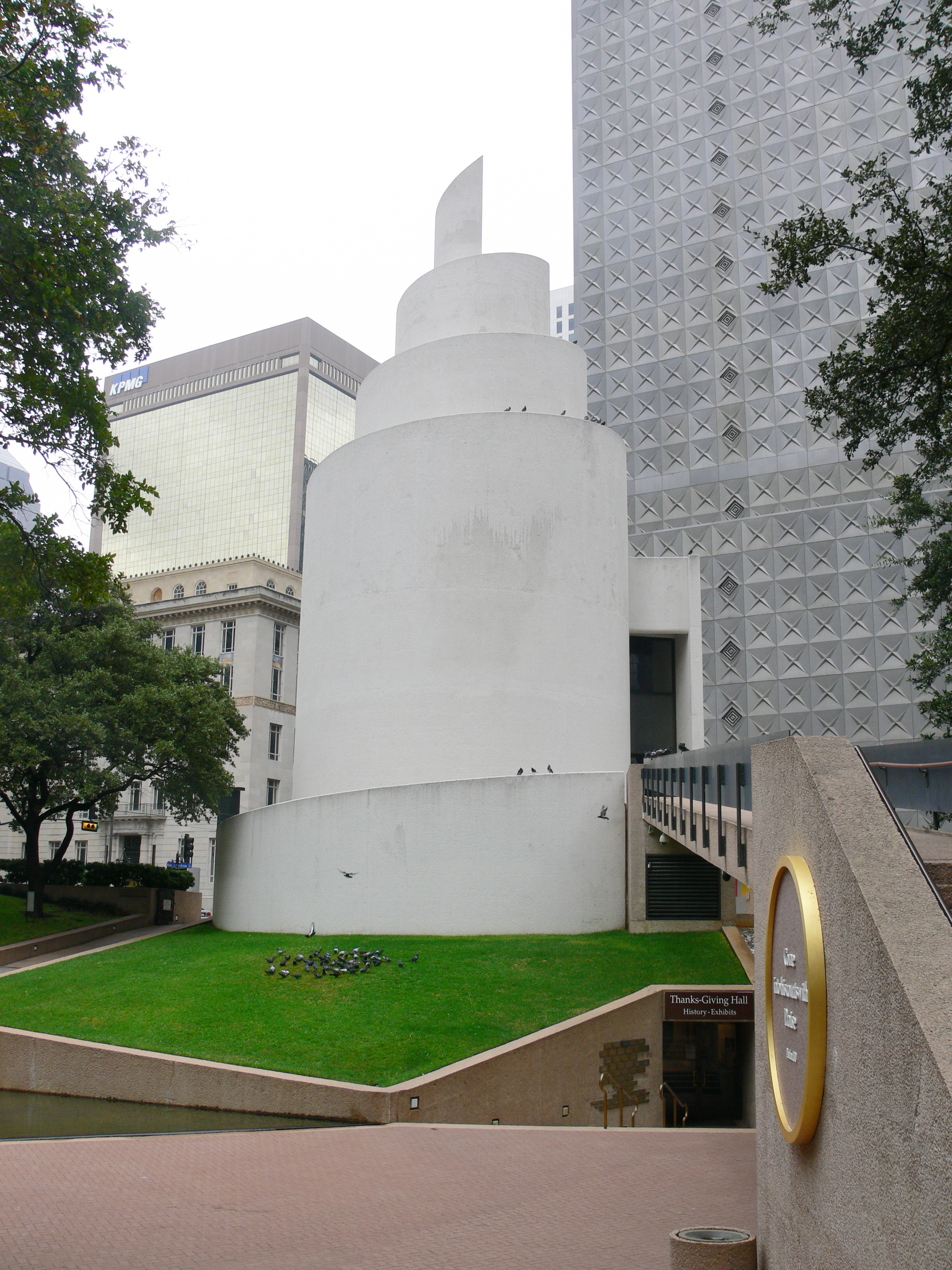
Chapel of Thanksgiving at Thanks-Giving Square in Dallas, Texas, built in 1976, inspired by the malwiya

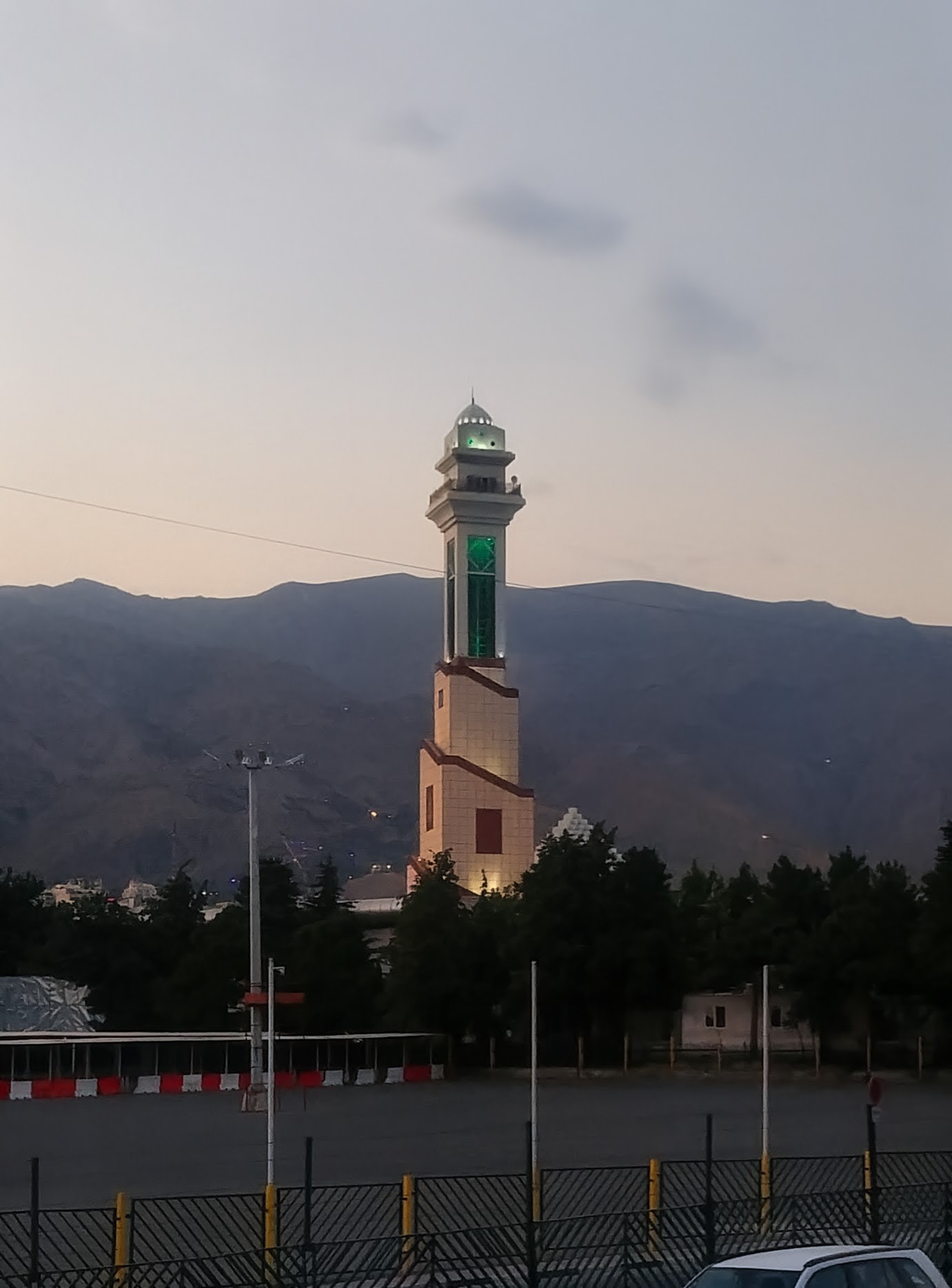
Post-modern mosque with a spiral minaret near Enghelab Sport Complex in Tehran, Iran

== See also ==
- The Wonderful Barn
- Independence Temple
