= Ali Karimi (disambiguation) =

Ali Karimi (born 1978) is an Iranian footballer who won Asian Footballer of the Year in 2004.

Ali Karimi may also refer to:

- Ali Karimi (footballer, born 1982), Iranian football striker who played for Saipa, Tractor Sazi, and Shahrdari Tabriz
- Ali Karimi (footballer, born 1994), Iranian international footballer who plays for Sepahan, Dinamo Zagreb, and Esteghlal
