= Foroughi =

Forūghī (Persian: فروغی), also transliterated as Foroughi, Forooghi and Furūghi, is a popular Persian surname. Notable people with the surname include:

- Mohammad-Ali Foroughi, prominent Iranian politician and scholar of the first half of the 20th century
- Mohammad-Hoseyn Foroughi, Iranian author and translator and the father of Mohammad-Ali Foroughi
- Abolhasan Foroughi, Iranian educator and author and younger brother of Mohammad-Ali Foroughi
- Mohsen Foroughi, pioneer of modern architecture in Iran, famous collector of Persian and Iranian antique art, and son of Mohammad-Ali Foroughi
- Abbas Foroughi Bastami, 19th-century Persian poet
- Fereydun Foroughi, Iranian singer
- Kamal Foroughi, British-Iranian businessman currently imprisoned in Iran
- Adam Foroughi, AppLovin Founder and CEO

== See also ==
- Forough, a given name
