= Reza Karimi (artist) =

Iranian artist

Reza Karimi (Persian: رضا کریمی) (born August 23, 1946) is an Iranian-born painter/artist living in New York.

Karimi was born in Isfahan, Iran on August 23, 1946. Emigrated to New York in 1969 (US Citizen).

He attended Queens College, 1974 & Brooklyn College, 1978. He originally started working with watercolor paintings based on his childhood in Isfahan, but moved on to paintings of the New York area. In more recent years, he has moved on to more oil-based paintings of a political bent, reflecting on the political turbulence of Iran, including the trial of Mossadegh and the treatment of women in Iran.

== Education ==
- Queens College, 1974
- Brooklyn College, 1978

== Displays of creative works ==
- Putnam Arts Council, 1987
- Borghi's & Co, New York City, 1990
- Mina Renton Gallery, London, 1992
- Hammer Galleries, New York City, 1993
- Creator / Editor Memories of Iran, 1991
- Neuberger Museum of Art, Purchase NY 1996 & NYC 1997
- Hammer Galleries, New York 1997
- The Dorchester, London 1998

== Notable awards ==
Grant, Ancient Persepolis, Fine Arts Ministry 1966 (Awarded 1st prize in professional show) Putnam Arts Council, 1987 (1st prize in professional show)

== Bibliography ==
Portrait of an Artist (film) 1992 Exhibition Review at Hammer (film) 1993 Aftab Productions, WNYC TV Network

== Member ==
Am Inst for Conservation Putnam Arts Council

== Media ==
Watercolor, Oil on Canvas

== Publications ==
Contributor, Technology in the service of art (Armon Magazine 9-91)

== Interviews ==
Ispand Magazine, Summer 1993 Exceptional Images, Glochin Publications, July 1994 Persian Heritage, Fall 1996 Hunter of light and Memories, Golchin Publications, May 1998 Bahrain Clientele, Victoria von Sydow, March/April 2008

== Dealer ==
Art Restoration Inc. (PO Box 29 School St, Mahopac Falls NY 10542)
