= Forugh Karimi =

Afghan-Dutch psychiatrist and author

- Born: 1971 (age 54–55); Kabul, Afghanistan
- Citizenship: Dutch
- Education: University of Amsterdam
- Occupations: Psychiatrist, author, translator

Forugh Karimi (born 1971) is an Afghan-Dutch psychiatrist and author.

== Early life ==
Karimi was born in Kabul, Afghanistan in 1971. As a teenager, she loved writing, and won a short story contest at the age of 19. In 1996, at the age of 25, she immigrated to the Netherlands. She can speak Dutch, English, and Farsi.

== Medical career ==
Karimi studied medicine at the University of Amsterdam, graduating in 2004. She worked first as a psychiatrist and psychotherapist before becoming an author. She has her own psychiatry practice named Pratijk Karimi, established in 2011. According to her website, she specializes in patients who come from immigrant families or refugee backgrounds.

== Literary career ==
Karimi has published many types of literary content, including academic articles, translations, and novels. She typically writes in Farsi or Dutch. As an author, she has been a member of the Council for Dutch Language and Literature from 2022 to 2025.

Karimi has translated works from Joost Zwagerman and Martinus Nijhoff.

In 2022, Karimi's debut novel, The Mothers of Mahipar, was published. It won the Hebban Debut Prize. The next year she published the novella Nargis.

In 2025, her third book was released, In My Eyes I Carry Clouds (Dutch: In mijn ogen draag ik wolken). Originally published in Dutch by Meridiaan Uitgevers and edited by Nelleke Geel, the novel follows an Afghan-Dutch psychiatrist who embarks on a roadtrip to Athens. In My Eyes I Carry Clouds is based on Karimi's own experiences as an Afghan immigrant and is partly inspired by a friend of hers, still in Afghanistan, who was killed by the Taliban in 2021. The novel has sold at least 10,000 copies.

In My Eyes I Carry Clouds won the 2026 Dutch booksellers award, given to a work that is deemed deserving of a wider audience. The panel praised Karimi's prose and depiction of exile from one's homeland. They said that her depiction of the protagonist "gives refugees a voice."

Karimi's work has been praised as offering an updated view in the literary landscape on Afghanistan, nearly 25 years after Khaled Hosseini's popular books The Kite Runner and A Thousand Splendid Suns.

=== Selected works ===
- The Mothers of Mahipar, 2022
- Nargis, 2023
- In My Eyes I Carry Clouds, 2025
