= Firuzabad, Fars =

City in Fars province, Iran

Firuzabad Persian: فيروزآباد
- City
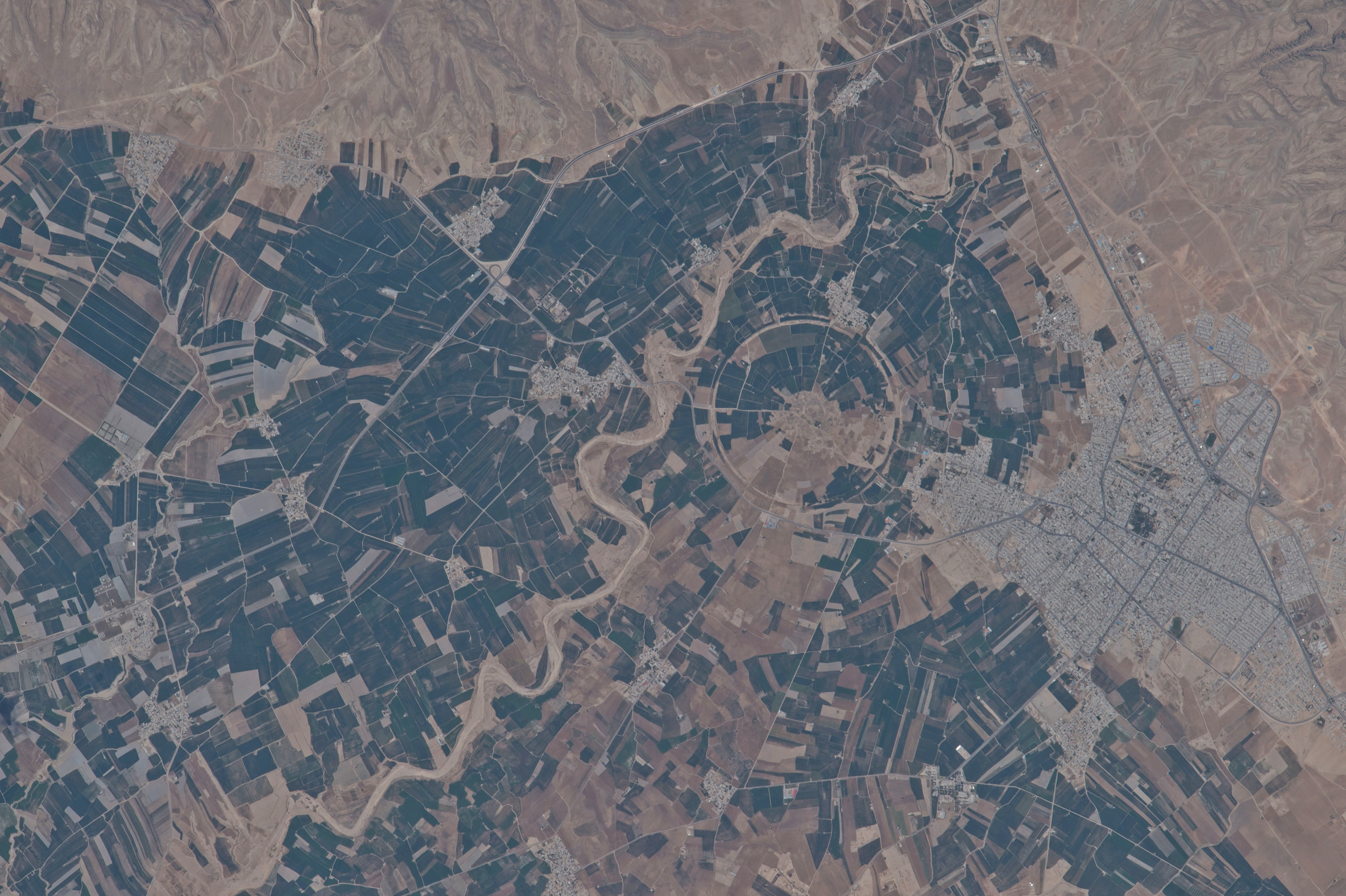
- Aerial photo of the modern town of Firuzabad and the ancient circular city of Gor nearby

- Location within Iran
- Coordinates: 28°50′40″N 52°34′17″E
- Country: Iran
- Province: Fars
- County: Firuzabad
- District: Central
- Elevation: 1,351 m (4,432 ft)

Population (2016)
  - Total: 65,417
- Time zone: UTC+3:30 (IRST)

Firuzabad (Persian: فيروزآباد) (Note: Also romanized as Fīrūzābād; also known as Piruzabad (پيروزآباد); Middle Persian: Ardashir-Khwarrah (The Glory of Ardashir) or Gōr; and Shahr-e Gūr (شهر گور)) is a city in the Central District of Firuzabad County, Fars province, Iran, serving as capital of both the county and the district. Firuzabad is south of Shiraz. The city is surrounded by a mud wall and ditch.

The original ancient city of Gor, dating back to the Achaemenid period, was destroyed by Alexander the Great. Centuries later, Ardashir I, the founder of the Sassanid Empire, revived the city before it was ransacked during the Arab Muslim invasion of the seventh century. It was again revived by the Buyids under Fanna Khusraw, but was eventually abandoned in the Qajar era and was replaced by a nearby town, which is now Firuzabad. Its only surviving structure is the central core, an ancient tower.

== History ==
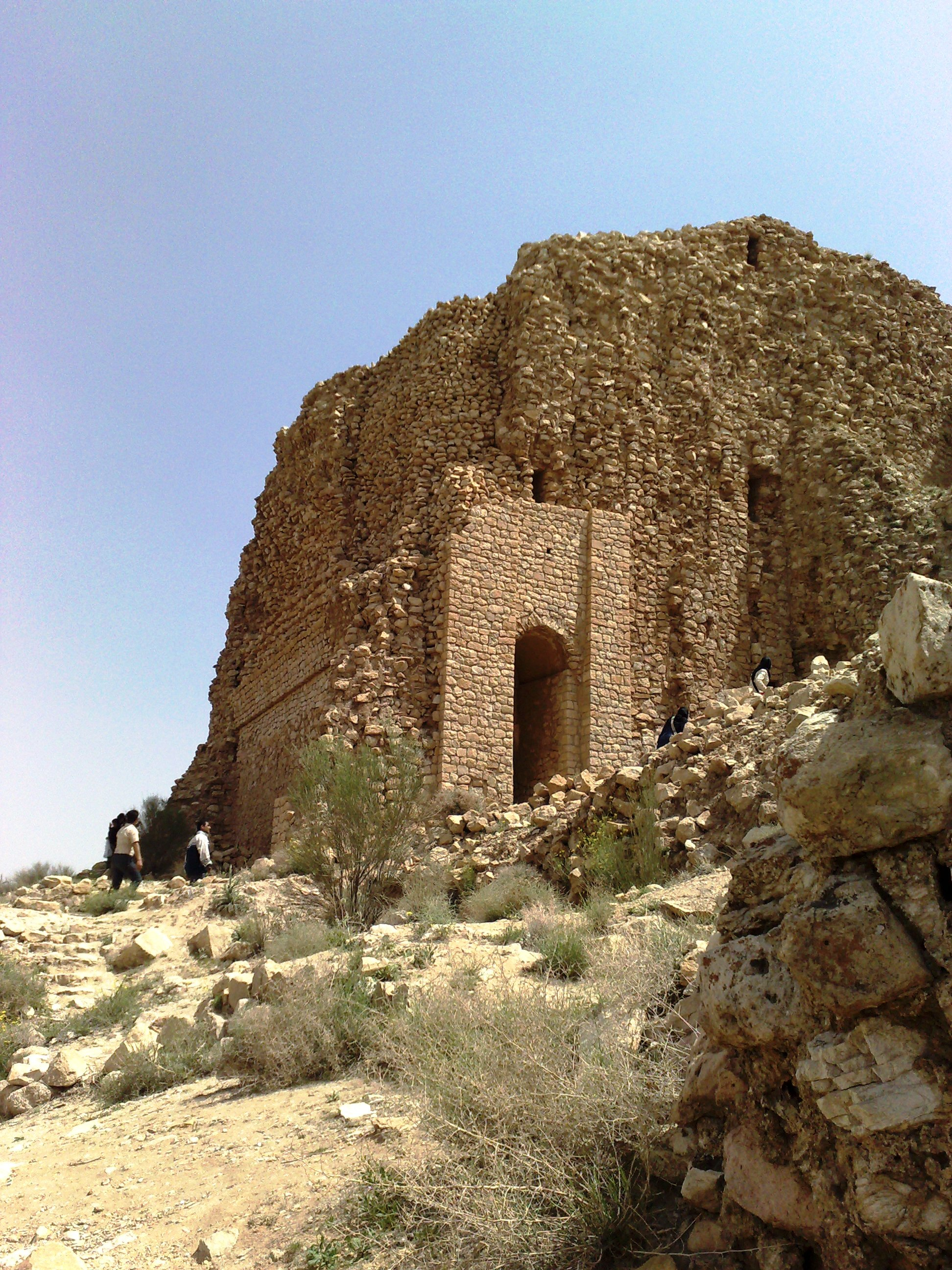
Ghal'eh Dokhtar

Gor dates back to the Achaemenid era. It was situated in a low-lying area of the region, so, during his invasion of Persia, Alexander the Great was able to drown the city by directing the flow of a river into the city. The lake he created remained until Ardashir I built a tunnel to drain it. He founded his new capital city on this site.

Ardashir's new city was known as Khor Ardashīr, Ardashīr Khurrah and Gōr. It had a circular plan so precise in measurement that the Persian historian Ibn Balkhi wrote it to be "devised using a compass". It was protected by a trench 50 meters in width, and was 2 kilometers in diameter. The city had four gates; to the north was the Hormozd Gate, to the south the Ardashir Gate, to the east the Mithra Gate and to the west the Wahram Gate. The royal capital's compounds were constructed at the center of a circle 450 m in radius. At the center of the town there was a lofty platform or tower, called Terbal. It was 30 m high and spiral in design. The design is unique in Iran, and there are several theories regarding the purpose of its construction. It is thought to have been the architectural predecessor of the Great Mosque of Samarra of Iraq and its distinctive minaret, the malwiya. In the Sasanian era, the abbreviation ART (in Inscriptional Pahlavi) was used as the mint signature to refer to Gōr.

Gōr and Istakhr strenuously resisted the invading Arab Muslims in the 630s and 640s; they were conquered by Abdallah ibn Amr in 649–50.

The city's importance was revived again in the reign of Fanna Khusraw of the Buyid dynasty, who frequently used the city as his residence. It is at this time that the old name of the city, Gōr, was abandoned in favor of the new. In New Persian, spoken at the time, the word Gōr (گور) had come to mean "grave". King Adud al-Dawla, as the story goes, found it distasteful to reside in a "grave". Per his instruction, the city's name was changed to Peroz-abad, "City of Victory." Since then, the city has been known by variations of that name, including Firuzabad (فیروزآباد Fīrūzābād). However, there is a 7th-century Arab-Sasanian coin from Ardashir-Khwarra during Umayyad period in which pylwj'b'd (Pahlavi; Pērōzābād) is mentioned as the mint.

The city was eventually abandoned in the Qajar era and its nearby settlement was populated, which is now the modern Firuzabad located 3 km to the east of the site of Gor. Today, among the attractions of Firuzabad are the Sassanid Ghal'eh Dokhtar, the Palace of Ardeshir, and the fire temple and its nearby Minar.

== Demographics ==
=== Ethnicity ===
Most of the city’s population consists of Persian-speaking residents. Additionally, Qashqai Turks make up a significant portion of the population which speak Qashqai turkic language. The nomadic tribes of the Qashqai, such as Shesh Bluki, Amale, and Kashkuli, traditionally inhabit pastures for eight months each year.

=== Population ===
At the time of the 2006 National Census, the city's population was 58,210 in 12,888 households. The following census in 2011 counted 64,969 people in 16,617 households. The 2016 census measured the population of the city as 65,417 people in 20,184 households.

== Climate ==
Firuzabad has a hot semi-arid climate (Köppen climate classification: BSh).

Climate data for Firuzabad (1991-2021), extremes (2009-2021)
Month	Jan	Feb	Mar	Apr	May	Jun	Jul	Aug	Sep	Oct	Nov	Dec	Year
Record high °C (°F)	25.2 (77.4)	24.4 (75.9)	28.8 (83.8)	31.6 (88.9)	38.2 (100.8)	42.0 (107.6)	42.7 (108.9)	42.4 (108.3)	39.6 (103.3)	35.8 (96.4)	31.6 (88.9)	25.8 (78.4)	42.7 (108.9)
Mean daily maximum °C (°F)	12.1 (53.8)	14.1 (57.4)	18.8 (65.8)	24.4 (75.9)	31.3 (88.3)	35.7 (96.3)	36.9 (98.4)	36.1 (97.0)	32.8 (91.0)	27.5 (81.5)	19.2 (66.6)	14.6 (58.3)	25.3 (77.5)
Daily mean °C (°F)	7.2 (45.0)	9.2 (48.6)	13.4 (56.1)	18.9 (66.0)	25.3 (77.5)	29.3 (84.7)	30.7 (87.3)	29.8 (85.6)	26.6 (79.9)	21.7 (71.1)	14.1 (57.4)	9.5 (49.1)	19.6 (67.4)
Mean daily minimum °C (°F)	1.9 (35.4)	3.5 (38.3)	6.9 (44.4)	12.0 (53.6)	17.6 (63.7)	21.3 (70.3)	23.3 (73.9)	22.2 (72.0)	19.3 (66.7)	14.9 (58.8)	8.5 (47.3)	4.0 (39.2)	13.0 (55.3)
Record low °C (°F)	−2.0 (28.4)	−5.2 (22.6)	−2.0 (28.4)	1.6 (34.9)	6.6 (43.9)	14.4 (57.9)	19.4 (66.9)	20.0 (68.0)	16.4 (61.5)	9.6 (49.3)	1.4 (34.5)	−0.2 (31.6)	−5.2 (22.6)
Average precipitation mm (inches)	76.8 (3.02)	89.1 (3.51)	35.9 (1.41)	53.0 (2.09)	11.5 (0.45)	0.4 (0.02)	2.2 (0.09)	2.0 (0.08)	1.9 (0.07)	2.1 (0.08)	32.4 (1.28)	65.2 (2.57)	372.5 (14.67)
Source: Normals , Extremes and precipitation

== Education ==
The city has five universities: Firuzabad Higher education university, Islamic Azad University, Firuzabad Branch; Payame Noor University, Firuzabad center; a branch of Technical and Vocational University; and a branch of University of Applied Science and Technology.

== See also ==
- Ghal'eh Dokhtar in Firuzabad
- Palace of Ardeshir in Firuzabad
- Bishapur
- Cities of the Ancient Near East
- Round city of Baghdad, modeled after Firuzabad and other Parthian and Sassanian round cities

== Sources ==
- Bosworth, C. E. (1986). "ARDAŠĪR-ḴORRA". Encyclopaedia Iranica, Vol. II, Fasc. 4. pp. 384–385.
- Daryaee, Touraj (2012). "MEHR-NARSEH". Encyclopaedia Iranica.
- Houtum-Schindler, Albert (1911). "Firūzabad" . In Chisholm, Hugh (ed.). Encyclopædia Britannica. Vol. 10 (11th ed.). Cambridge University Press. p. 425.
- Huff, Dietrich (1999). "FĪRŪZĀBĀD". Encyclopaedia Iranica, Vol. IX, Fasc. 6. pp. 633–636.
- Miri, Negin (2009). "Historical Geography of Fars during the Sasanian Period" (PDF). Sasanika. University of Sydney. pp. 1–65. Archived from the original (PDF) on 4 April 2016.
- Mittertrainer, Anahita Nasrin (2020). Sinnbilder politischer Autorität? Frühsasanidische Städtebilder im Südwesten Irans [Emblems of political authority? Early Sasanian cityscapes in southwestern Iran]. LMU Munich,ISBN 978-3-95925-131-0, on Firuzabad esp. pp. 69–131.
- Morony, M. (1986). "ʿARAB ii. Arab conquest of Iran". Encyclopaedia Iranica, Vol. II, Fasc. 2. pp. 203–210.
- Perikhanian, A. (1983). "Iranian Society and Law". The Cambridge History of Iran: The Seleucid, Parthian, and Sasanian periods (2). Cambridge: Cambridge University Press. pp. 627–681. ISBN 978-0-521-24693-4.
