= Gumbaz =

- Location within Pakistan
- Coordinates: 35.44°N 71.47°E
- Country: Pakistan
- Province: Khyber Pakhtunkhwa
- Elevation: 1,598 m (5,243 ft)
- Time zone: UTC+5 (PST)

Gumbaz (Urdu: گنبذ, "gonbad" [dome]) is a village in Khyber Pakhtunkhwa province of Pakistan. It is located at 35°44'16N 71°47'3E with an altitude of 1,598 metres (5,243 ft).
