= Arab-Ata Mausoleum =

Coordinates: 39.695457°N 65.793068°E

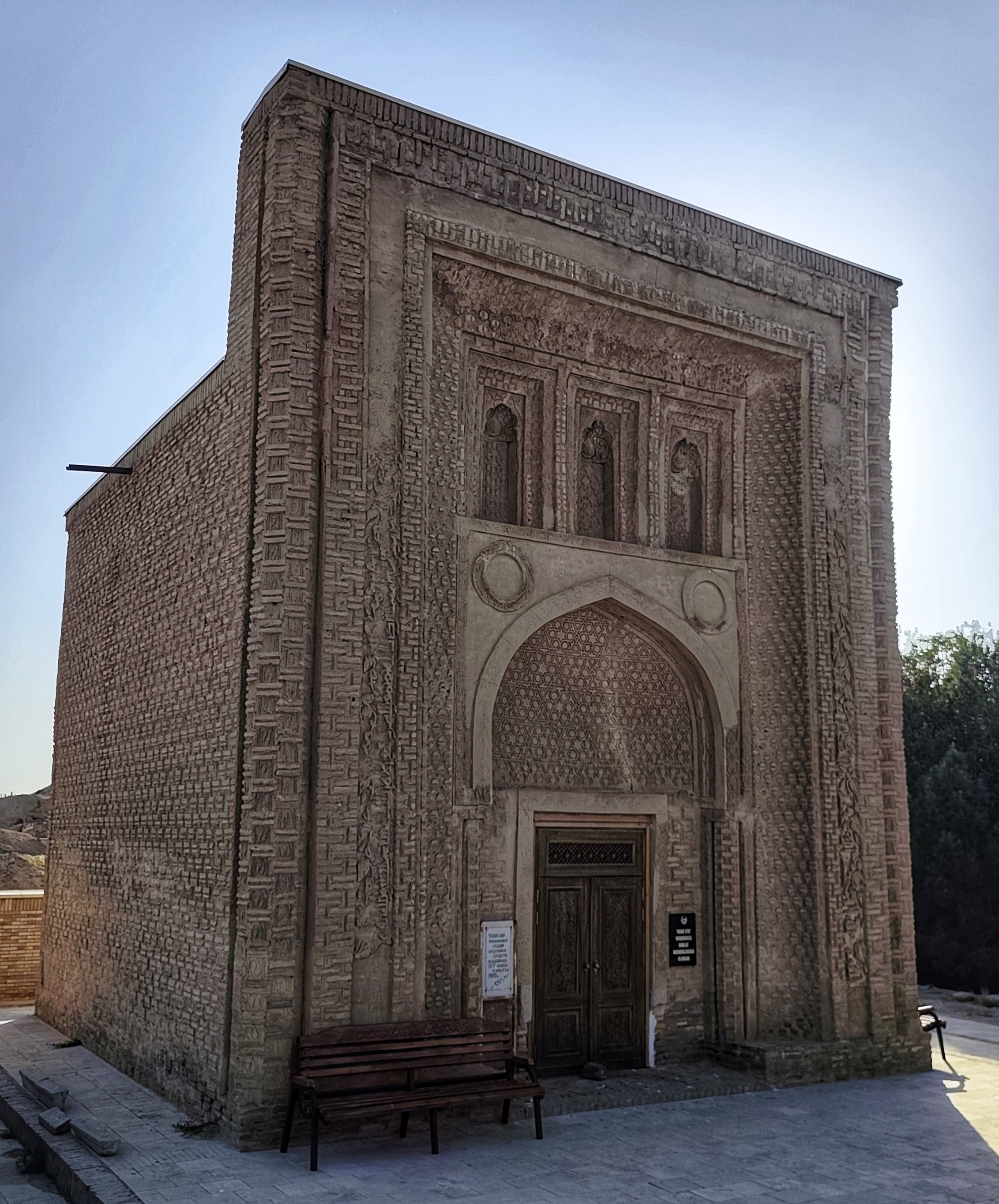
Arab-Ata Mausoleum, built in 977-78 in the village of Tim, Samarqand Region, Uzbekistan. Photographed by Pavel Novik

The Arab-Ata Mausoleum (Uzbek: Arabota maqbarasi, lit. 'Shrine of the Arab Father') is a cubical, domed brick mausoleum built in 977-78 in the village of Tim, Samarqand Region, Uzbekistan. Built during the Samanid Empire, the Arab-Ata Mausoleum was among the earliest buildings to include three notable features of Islamic architecture: the muqarnas, mihrab, and pishtaq. Following the appearance of the mihrab in the Arab-Ata mausoleum, mihrabs became a more common feature in mausoleums from the tenth century on. The Arab-Ata is the earliest dated example of a pishtaq, with it becoming a staple of Islamic architecture. It has been proposed that the pishtaq developed further with the many Seljuq domes from the eleventh and twelfth centuries.

== Site description ==
Built on top of a tepa, or triangular-shaped hill, in the tenth century, the mausoleum fills an important gap in understanding the evolution of mausoleum architecture in Central Asia.

=== Exterior ===
The Arab-Ata mausoleum is nearly a square building located near the remote village of Tim in the Zerafshan hills, south of the road from Bukhara, with dimensions of 8 meters x 8.7 meters, built entirely out of brick and mortar. The mausoleum is topped with a dome that, when facing the entrance of the mausoleum, is obscured by a pishtaq, a rectangular frame around an arch opening that rose to 9 meters high when constructed initially. The Arab-Ata mausoleum has the first known inclusion of a pishtaq. The pishtaq frames a singular ogee-shaped entrance facing northeast. Around the pishtaq ran an inscription in relief of sura 2, 281, a verse out of the Quran, marking it as one of the earliest surviving examples of Arabic calligraphy appearing on an Islamic building in Central Asia. Part of the inscription that has been lost would have informed the visitor of the social position, date of birth, and death of the deceased, while part of what survives provides the date of completion (September/October 979). The square building itself has integrated corner columns acting to frame the mausoleum. The doorway recesses into the mausoleum and is topped by a pointed arch on two engaged columns, decorated with an interlacing star pattern done in stucco. Above the arch are three niches ornamented in geometric patterns out of stucco.

=== Interior ===
The mausoleum's interior is notable for being amongst the earliest mausoleums to include muqarnas and the mihrab as fundamental features of its interior design, both of which would develop into important characteristics of mausoleums. Like the Samanid Mausoleum in Bukhara, the Arab-Ata showcases a tripartite transition between a square base and circular dome via the construction of two spherical triangles. This was done by using corner squinches flanked by a half squinch on both sides. From this development, the muqarnas developed into an important decorative feature in Islamic architecture. Opposite the entrance to the mausoleum lies the structure's mihrab (prayer niche). The mihrab, is among the earliest known examples of a prayer niche in mausolea, appearing more frequently from the tenth century with the Arab-Ata.

== World Heritage Status ==
This site was added to the UNESCO World Heritage Tentative List on January 18, 2008 in the Cultural category.

== See also ==
- Persian domes
- History of Uzbekistan
