= Persian domes =

Part of Persian architecture

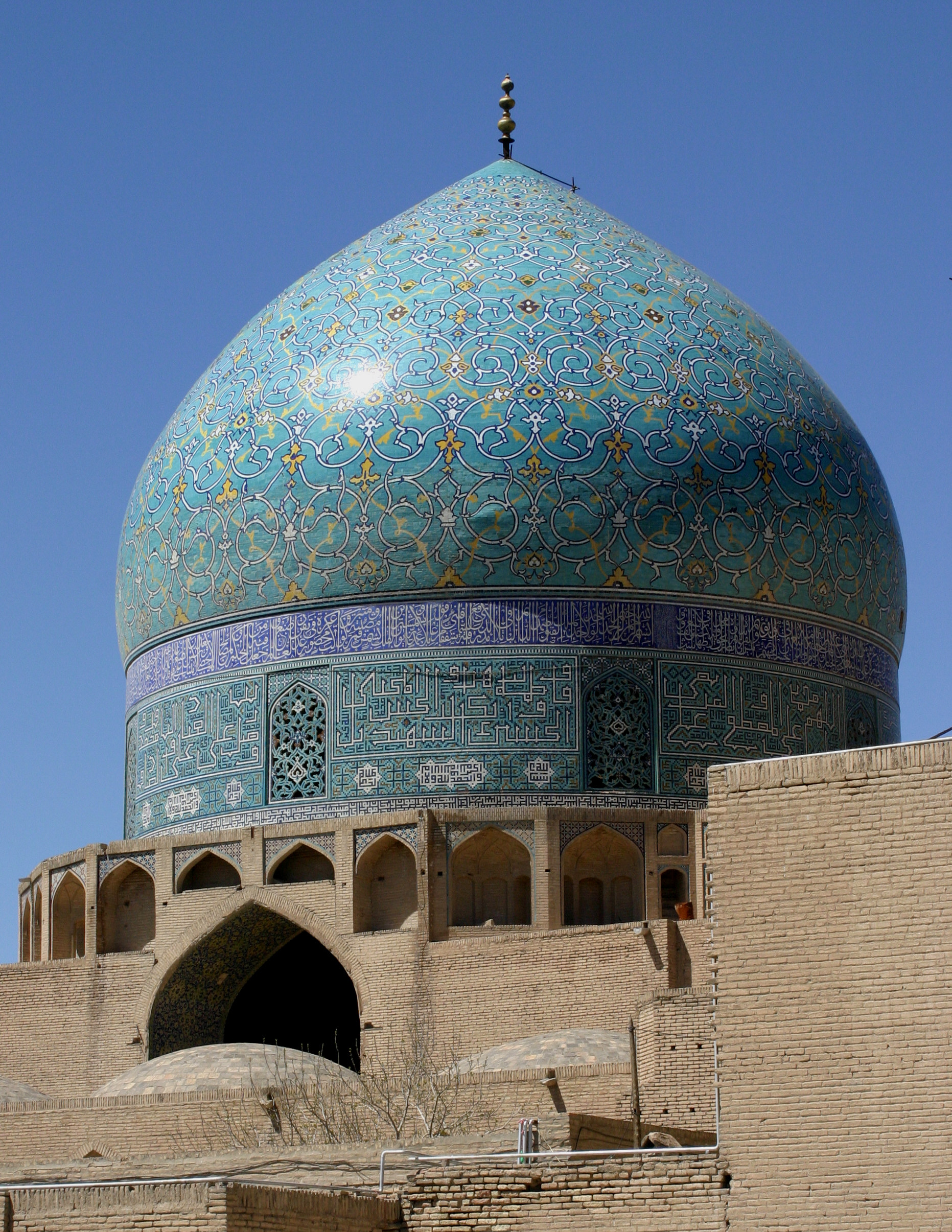
The dome of the Shah Mosque in Isfahan (17th century)

Persian domes or Iranian domes have an ancient origin and a history extending to the modern era. The use of domes in ancient Mesopotamia was carried forward through a succession of empires in the Greater Iran region.

An ancient tradition of royal audience tents representing the heavens was translated into monumental stone and brick domes due to the invention of the squinch, a reliable method of supporting the circular base of a heavy dome upon the walls of a square chamber. Domes were built as part of royal palaces, castles, caravansaries, and temples, among other structures.

With the introduction of Islam in the 7th century, mosque and mausoleum architecture also adopted and developed these forms. Structural innovations included pointed domes, drums, conical roofs, double and triple shells, and the use of muqarnas and bulbous forms. Decorative brick patterning, interlaced ribs, painted plaster, and colorful tiled mosaics were used to decorate the exterior as well as the interior surfaces.

== Characteristics ==
Persian architecture likely inherited an architectural tradition of dome-building dating back to the earliest Mesopotamian domes. In Central Asia, mudbrick domes have been documented as far back as the late third millennium BC. Buildings with domes made of un-fired bricks have been found at fourth century BC sites at Balandy 2 and Koj Krylgan kala in Khorezm. Due to the scarcity of wood in many areas of the Iranian plateau, domes were an important part of vernacular architecture throughout Persian history.

Persian dome chambers in mosques were derived from the chahar taq dome chambers of Sasanian Fire Temples and consisted of three parts: the load-bearing system, the transition tier, and the dome itself. Double and triple shell domes had considerable space between the shells or could be connected and the outer shell could be conical, onion-shaped, or bulbous, with bulbous shaped domes being the last and most influential development. The transition tiers used squinches or pendentives, and beginning in the Timurid period the curved surface was divided by a pattern of intersecting arches called an "arch net", or rasmi sazi, which had its culmination in the Safavid period.

Persian domes from different historical eras can be distinguished by their transition tiers: the squinches, spandrels, or brackets that transition from the supporting structures to the circular base of a dome. Drums, after the Ilkanate era, tend to be very similar and have an average height of 30 to 35 meters from the ground. They are where windows are located. Inner shells are commonly semi-circular, semi-elliptical, pointed, or saucer shaped. The outer shell of a Persian dome reduces in thickness every 25 or 30 degrees from the base. Outer shells can be semi-circular, semi-elliptical, pointed, conical, or bulbous, and this outer shape is used to categorize them. Pointed domes can be sub-categorized as having shallow, medium, and sharp profiles, and bulbous domes as either shallow or sharp. Double domes use internal stiffeners with wooden struts between the shells, with the exception of those with conical outer shells.

Persian mathemetician Abul Wafa al-Buzjani (940–998) was the first to "study the geometric constructions of ornamental patterns and the projection of these patterns onto a sphere in his treatise The book on what the artisan requires of geometric constructions (Kitab fima yahtaju ilayhi al-sani' min a'mal al-handasa)." He used two-dimensional drawings to illustrate how to tile a sphere using various polygons in a tessellated pattern.

== Elamite Era ==
In 2007, during excavation and construction activities near the village of Jubaji in Ramhormoz County, Khuzestan Province, a royal tomb dating back to the 6th century BCE was discovered. The structure consists of an underground stone burial chamber oriented east–west, measuring 4.5 meters in length and 2.2 meters in width, which is accessible via a staircase on the western side. It is likely that a dome once covered this space. Tombs with similar dome (and vault) structures, dating from the 8th to the 6th centuries BCE, have also been found in Apadana at Susa.

== Achaemenid Empire ==
Although they had palaces of brick and stone, the kings of Achaemenid Persia held audiences and festivals in domical tents derived from the nomadic traditions of central Asia. They were likely similar to the later tents of the Mongol Khans. Called "Heavens", these tents emphasized the cosmic significance of the divine ruler. They were adopted by Alexander the Great after his conquest of the empire, and the domed baldachin of Roman and Byzantine practice was presumably inspired by this association.

== Parthian Empire ==
The remains of a large domed circular hall measuring 17 meters in diameter in the Parthian capital city of Nyssa has been dated to perhaps the first century AD. It "shows the existence of a monumental domical tradition in Central Asia that had hitherto been unknown and which seems to have preceded Roman Imperial monuments or at least to have grown independently from them." It likely had a wooden dome. The room "contained a portrait of Mithradates II and, along with other structures at the site, hosted some sort of cult activities connected to the memory of the kings of kings."

The Sun Temple at Hatra appears to indicate a transition from columned halls with trabeated roofing to vaulted and domed construction in the first century AD, at least in Mesopotamia. The domed sanctuary hall of the temple was preceded by a barrel vaulted iwan, a combination that would be used by the subsequent Persian Sasanian Empire.

A bulbous Parthian dome can be seen in the relief sculpture of the Arch of Septimius Severus in Rome, its shape apparently due to the use of a light tent-like framework.

An account of a Parthian domed palace hall from around 100 AD in the city of Babylon can be found in the Life of Apollonius of Tyana by Philostratus. The hall was used by the king for passing judgments and was decorated with a mosaic of blue stone to resemble the sky, with images of gods in gold. It may have been an audience tent; Philostratus described the ceiling as "constructed in the form of a dome like the heavens."

== Sasanian Empire ==
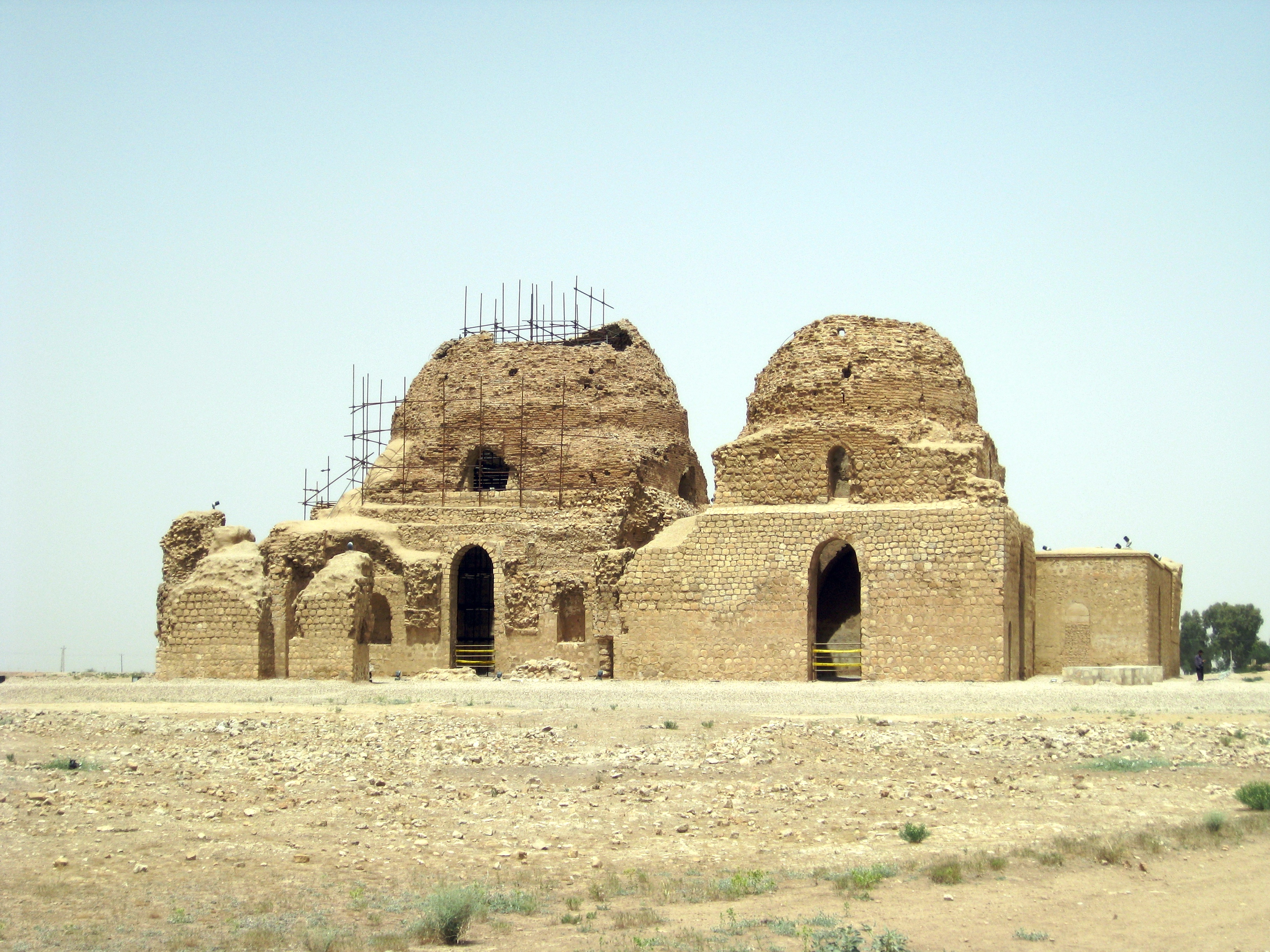
Ruins of the Sarvestan Palace in Sarvestan, Iran

Caravansaries used the domed bay from the Sasanian period to the Qajar dynasty. The Persian invention of the squinch, a series of concentric arches forming a half-cone over the corner of a room, enabled the transition from the walls of a square chamber to an octagonal base for a dome. Previous transitions to a dome from a square chamber existed but were makeshift in quality and only attempted on a small scale, not being reliable enough for large constructions. The squinch enabled domes to be widely used and they moved to the forefront of Persian architecture as a result. The domes supported on squinches had a circular horizontal section and a half-elliptical vertical profile made without centring.

The ruins of the Palace of Ardashir and Ghal'eh Dokhtar in Fars province, Iran, built by Ardashir I (224–240) of the Sasanian Empire, have the earliest known examples of squinches. The three domes of the Palace of Ardashir are 14 metres (45 ft) in diameter and vertically elliptical, each with a central opening or oculus to admit light. They were built with local stone and mortar and covered with plaster on the interior. The dome and the squinches were made of "cobbles embedded in gypsum mortar".

At the center of the palace of Shahpur, at Bishapur, there is a vertically-elliptical dome that rests directly on the ground and is dated to 260.

The large brick dome of the Sarvestan Palace, also in Fars but later in date, shows more elaborate decoration and four windows between the corner squinches. Also called "the Temple of Anahita", the building may have been a Fire temple. The squinches of the 5th century Sarvestan Palace dome were in the form of half-pavilion vaults, rather than conical squinches. Although the dome was made with brick, the squinches were made with rough stone and cobbles in gypsum mortar. Instead of using a central oculus in each dome, as at the Palace of Ardashir and as shown in the bas relief found at Kuyunjik, lighting was provided by a number of hollow terracotta cylinders set into the domes at regular intervals.

Multiple written accounts from Arabic, Byzantine, and Western medieval sources describe a palace domed structure over the throne of Chosroes decorated in blue and gold. The dome was covered with depictions of the sun, moon, stars, planets, the zodiac, astrapai, and kings, including Chosroes himself. According to Ado and others, the dome could produce rain, and could be rotated with a sound like thunder by means of ropes pulled by horses in a basement. The castle of Qasr-e Shirin had a domed chamber at the end of a long barrel-vaulted iwan. The late-Sasanian Tāq-i Kasrā in Ctesiphon may also have led to a domed throne room.

Chahar-taqi, or "four vaults", were smaller Zoroastrian fire temple structures with four supports arranged in a square, connected by four arches, and covered by central ovoid domes. The Niasar Zoroastrian temple in Kashan and the chahar-taqi in Darreh Shahr are examples. They are numerous throughout the province of Pars, possibly starting from the early Sasanian empire, and are known to be part of the palatial architecture of Ardashir I. Such temples, square domed buildings with entrances at the axes, inspired the forms of early mosques after the Islamic conquest of the empire in the 7th century. These domes are the most numerous surviving type from the Sasanian period, with some having been converted into mosques. The later isolated dome chambers called the "kiosk mosque" type may have developed from this. Pre-Islamic domes in Persia are commonly semi-elliptical, with pointed domes and those with conical outer shells being the majority of the domes in the Islamic periods.

Although the Sasanians did not create monumental tombs, the domed chahar-taqi may have served as memorials. A Soghdian painting fragment from the early eighth century found at Panjakent appears to depict a funerary dome (possibly a tent) and this, along with a few ossuaries of an architectural nature, indicates a possible tradition in central Asia of a funerary association with the domed form. The area of north-eastern Iran was, along with Egypt, one of two areas notable for early developments in Islamic domed mausoleums, which appear in the tenth century.

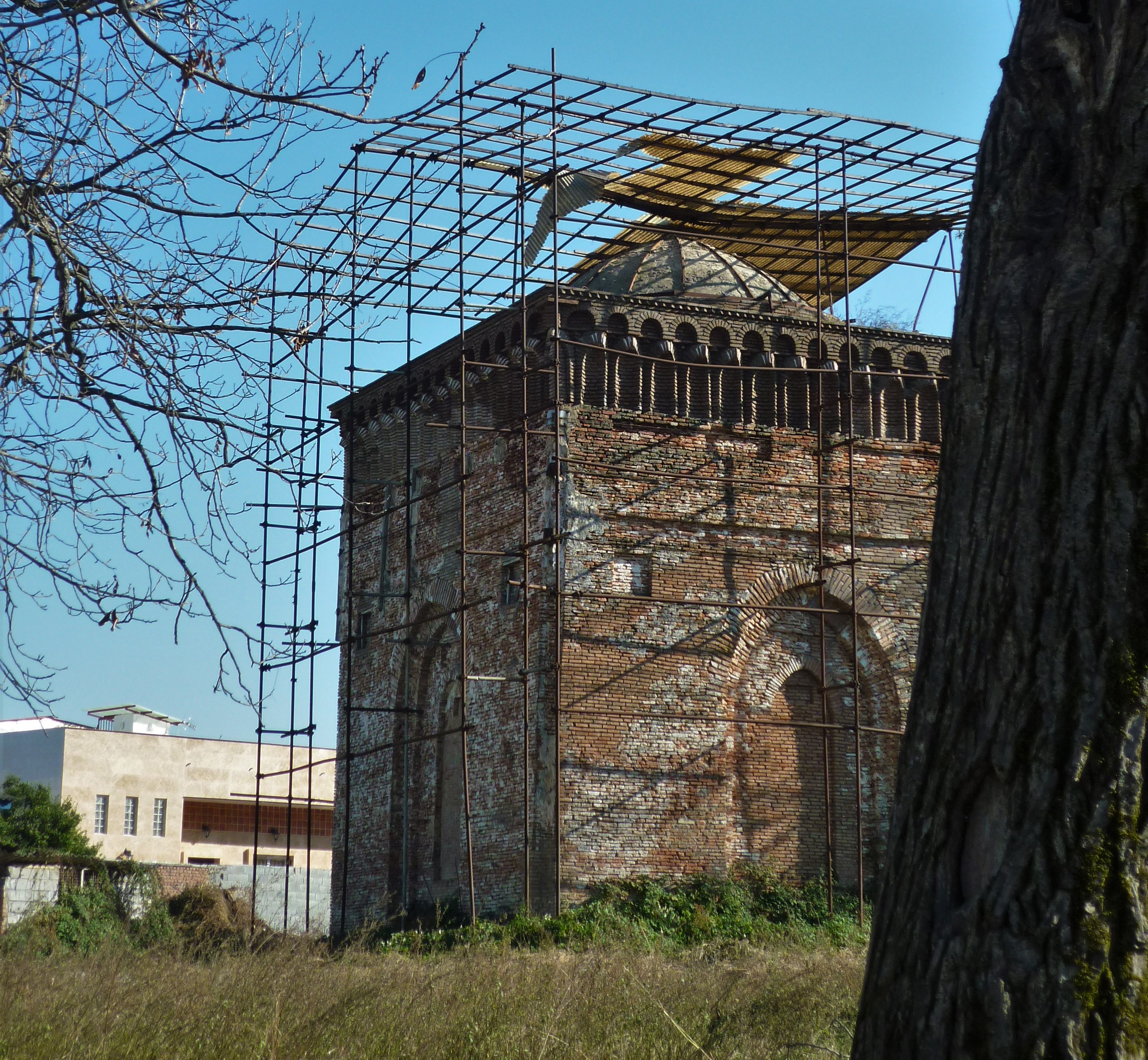
Ruins of the Zoroastrian Fire Temple of Amol, Iran

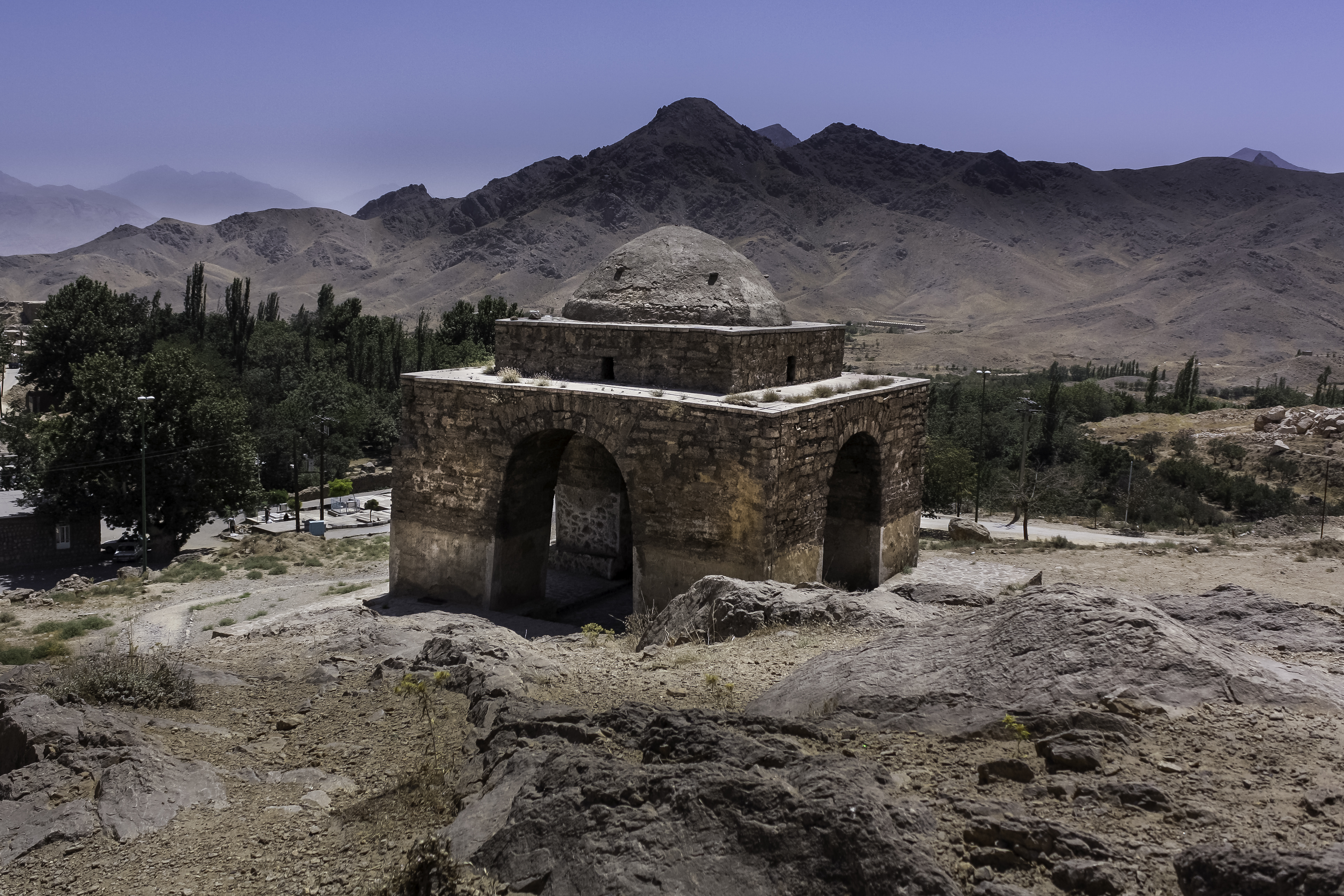
Ruins of a Zoroastrian Temple in Neyasar, Iran

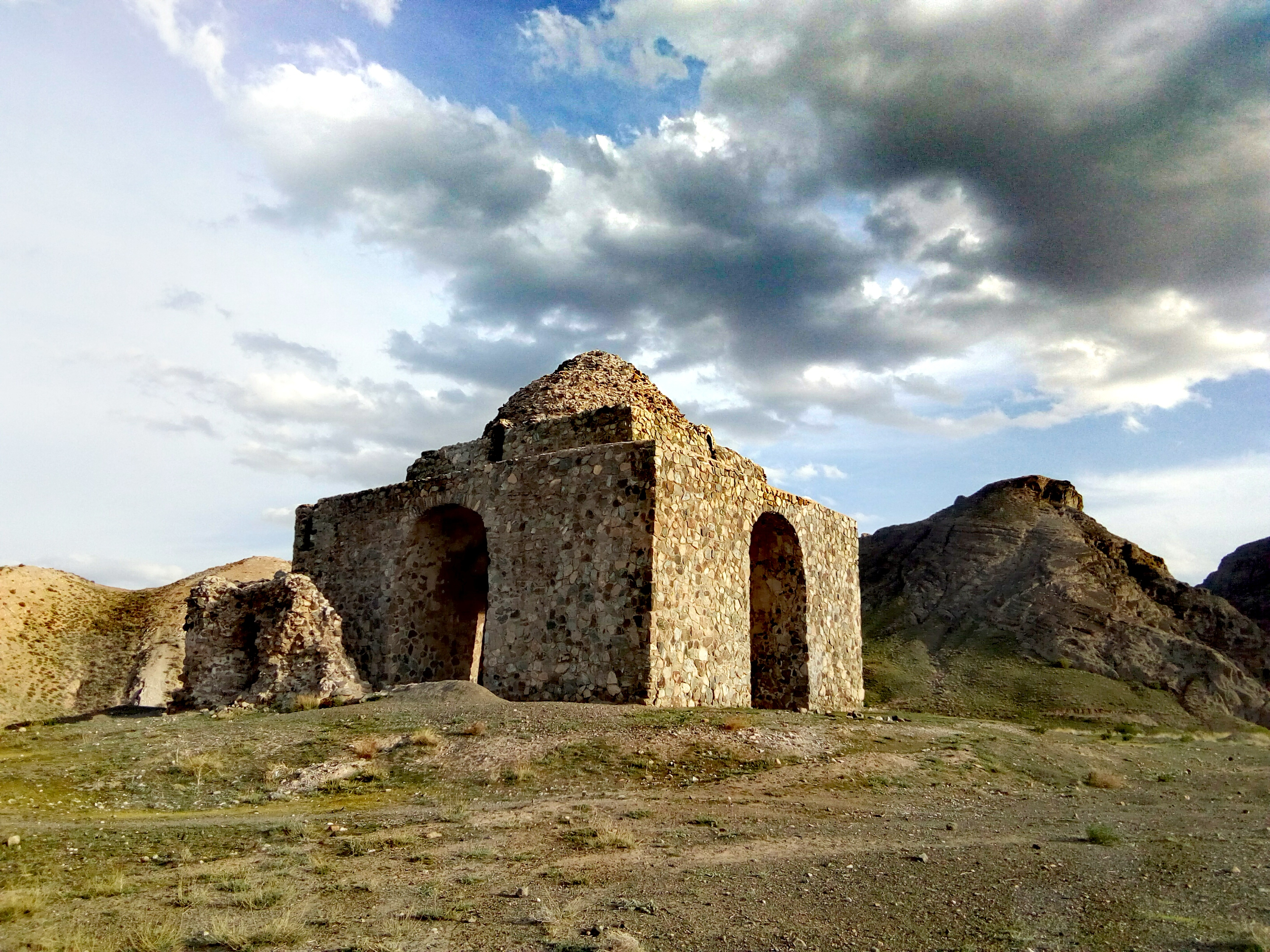
Ruins of the Baze Hoor Zoroastrian temple, Iran

Zoroastrian temple in Tashvir, Iran

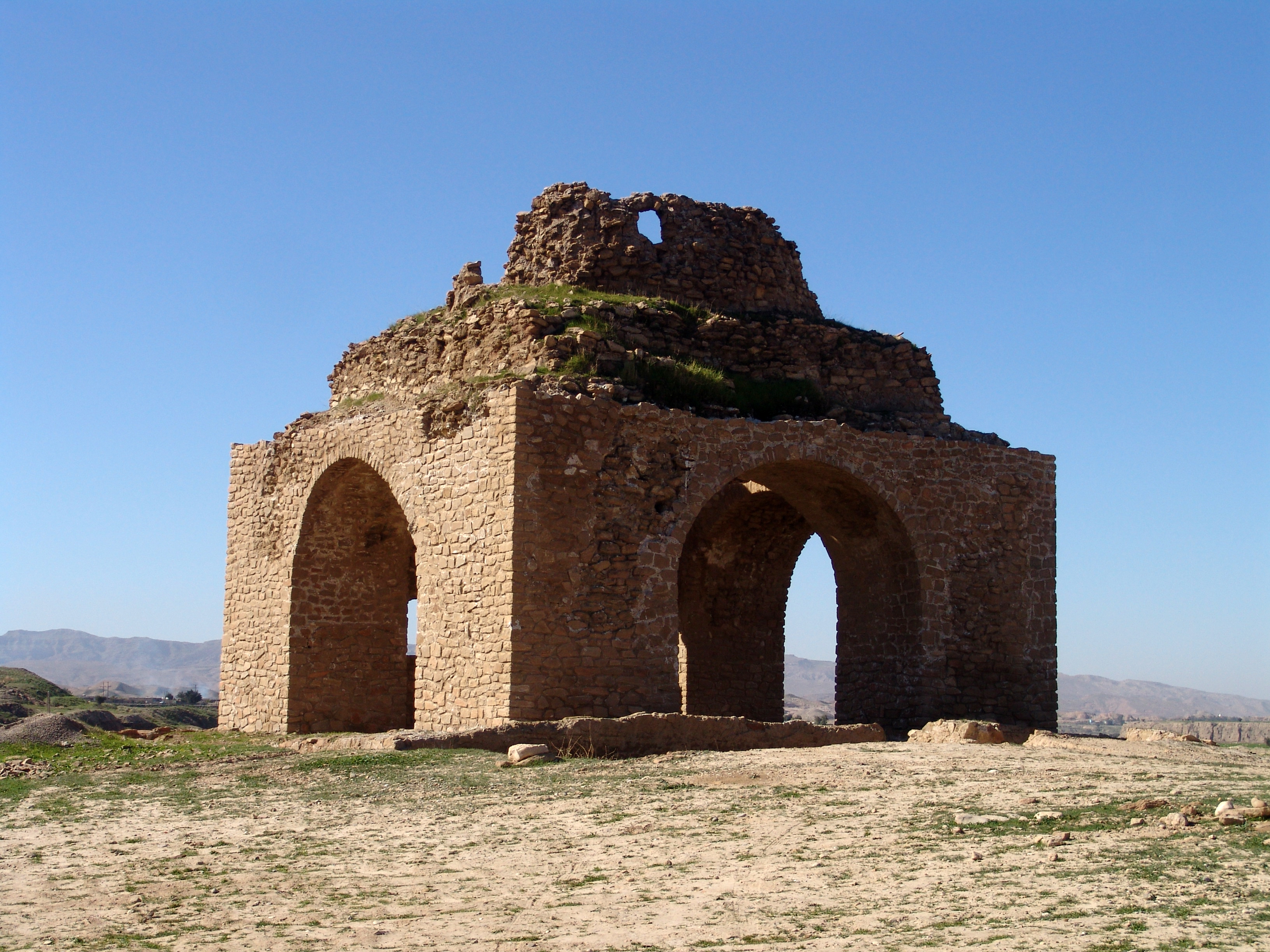
Ruins of Chahar-taqi in Neyasar, Iran

== Early Islamic period ==
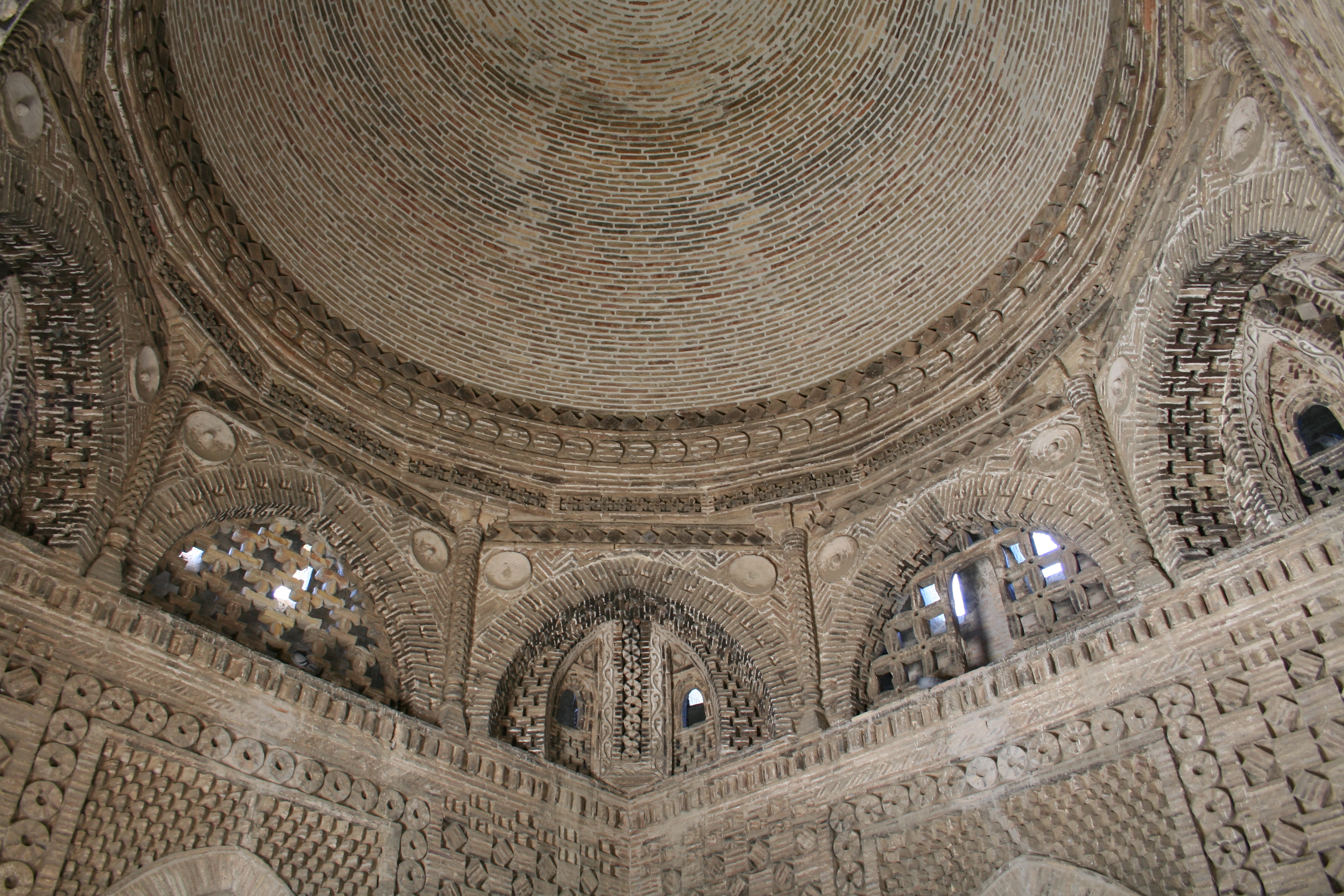
Samanid Mausoleum in Bukhara, Uzbekistan.

The earliest known Islamic domes in Persia, such as the Great Mosque of Qom (878) and the tomb of Muhammed b. Musa (976), seem to have continued the rounded Sasanian form.

Domed mausoleums contributed greatly to the development and spread of the dome in Persia early in the Islamic period. By the 10th century, domed tombs had been built for Abbasid caliphs and Shiite martyrs. Pilgrimage to these sites may have helped to spread the form. The earliest surviving example in Islamic architecture, the Qubbat-al Sulaibiya, was an octagonal structure with a central dome on a drum built around 892 in Samarra on the Tigris. The mausoleum of Ali in Najaf, built by the Hamdanid governor of Mosul before 930, had a high dome supported by columns and had entrances on all sides. Reportedly, Buyid dynasty kings built high domes over their tombs and the tombs of minor princes had lower domes.

Free-standing domed pavilions are known from Shiraz and Bukhara in the tenth century. An octagonal domed pavilion built in 999 under the Buyid dynasty was later incorporated into the Jameh Mosque of Natanz. The original free-standing structure was a central dome on eight piers surrounding by a vaulted ambulatory on eight outer round columns, open on all sides. A sixteen-sided zone of transition was used below the dome. The southern half of the dome is made of stone, indicating repairs after a partial collapse. The date of the original construction was included in a brick inscription band just below the dome, making it the earliest dated dome in central Iran. The ambulatory may have been for circumambulation, suggesting that the structure was a shrine to a descendant of the Prophet, or Imamzadeh.

In the 10th century, domed mausoleums of the domed square type became popular in the Transoxiana region. The Ismail Samanid mausoleum in Bukhara was designed according to the geometric principles of mathematicians al-Khorezmi, al-Fargani, and Ibn-Sino. It dates to no later than 943 and is the first to have squinches create a regular octagon as a base for the dome, which then became the standard practice. The Arab-Ata Mausoleum, also in Transoxiana, may be dated to 977–78 and uses muqarnas between the squinches for a more unified transition to the dome.

Cylindrical or polygonal plan tower tombs with conical roofs over domes also exist beginning in the 11th century. The earliest example is the Gonbad-e Qabus tower tomb, 57 meters high and spanning 9.7 meters, which was built in 1007. Although no burial has been found at the site, the Ziyarid ruler was purported by a 16th-century Arab historian to have been in a glass coffin suspended by chains from the ceiling, which corresponds to Buyid burial customs described in the 14th century.

The ruins of four domed tombs at Mohra Sharif in the Gomal valley of Pakistan have been dated to the 11th and first half of the 12th centuries under the Ghaznavids based on stylistic similarity to the 11th century mausoleum of Alam Bardar Al-Muntasar in Turkmenistan, about 25km away. The Ghaznavid palace of Lashkari Bazar had a cruciform entrance hall and a throne room preceded by an iwan that are both presumed to have been domed, like those of the Umayyad palace at Amman Citadel.

== Seljuk Empire ==
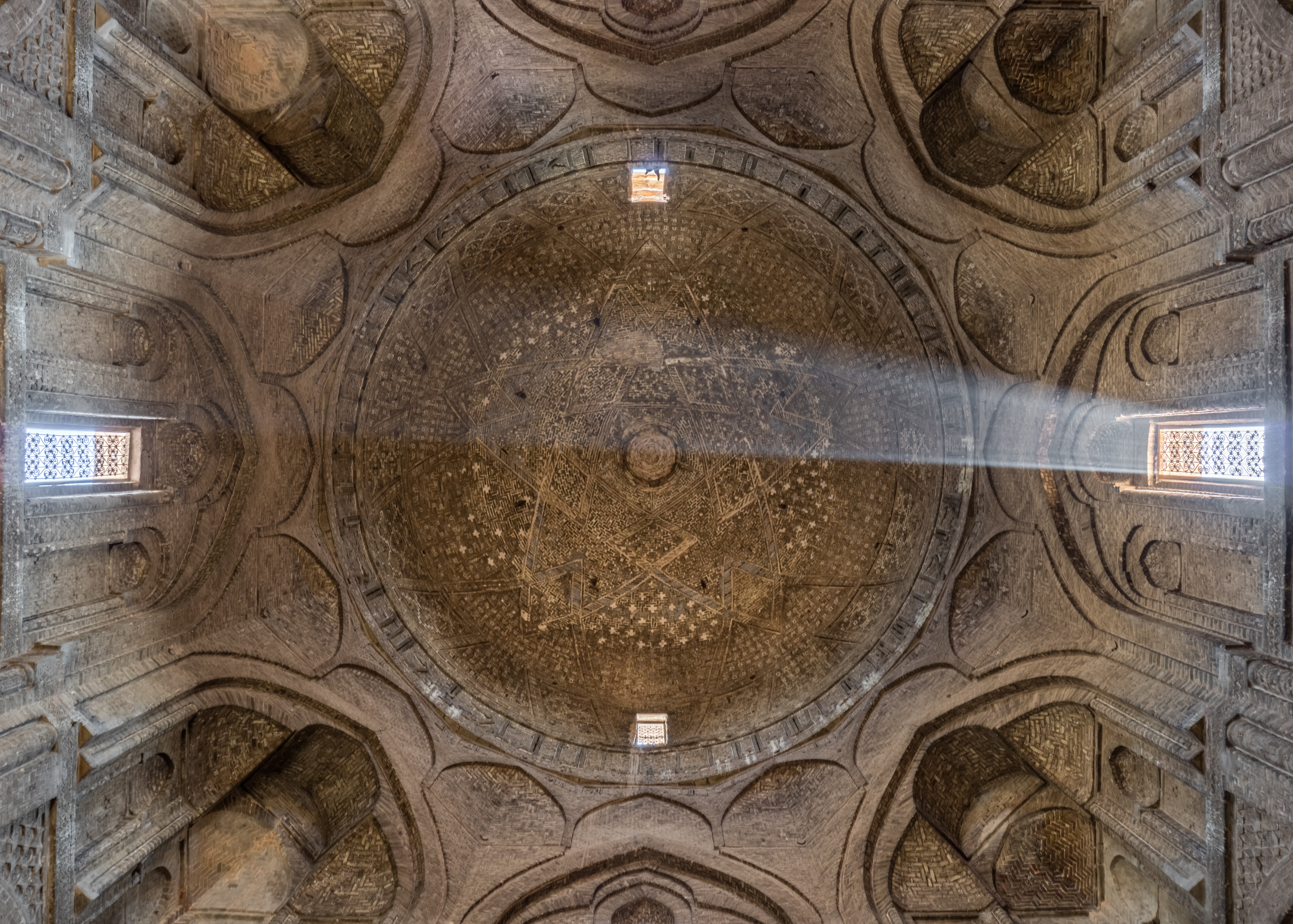
The Jameh Mosque in Isfahan, Iran.

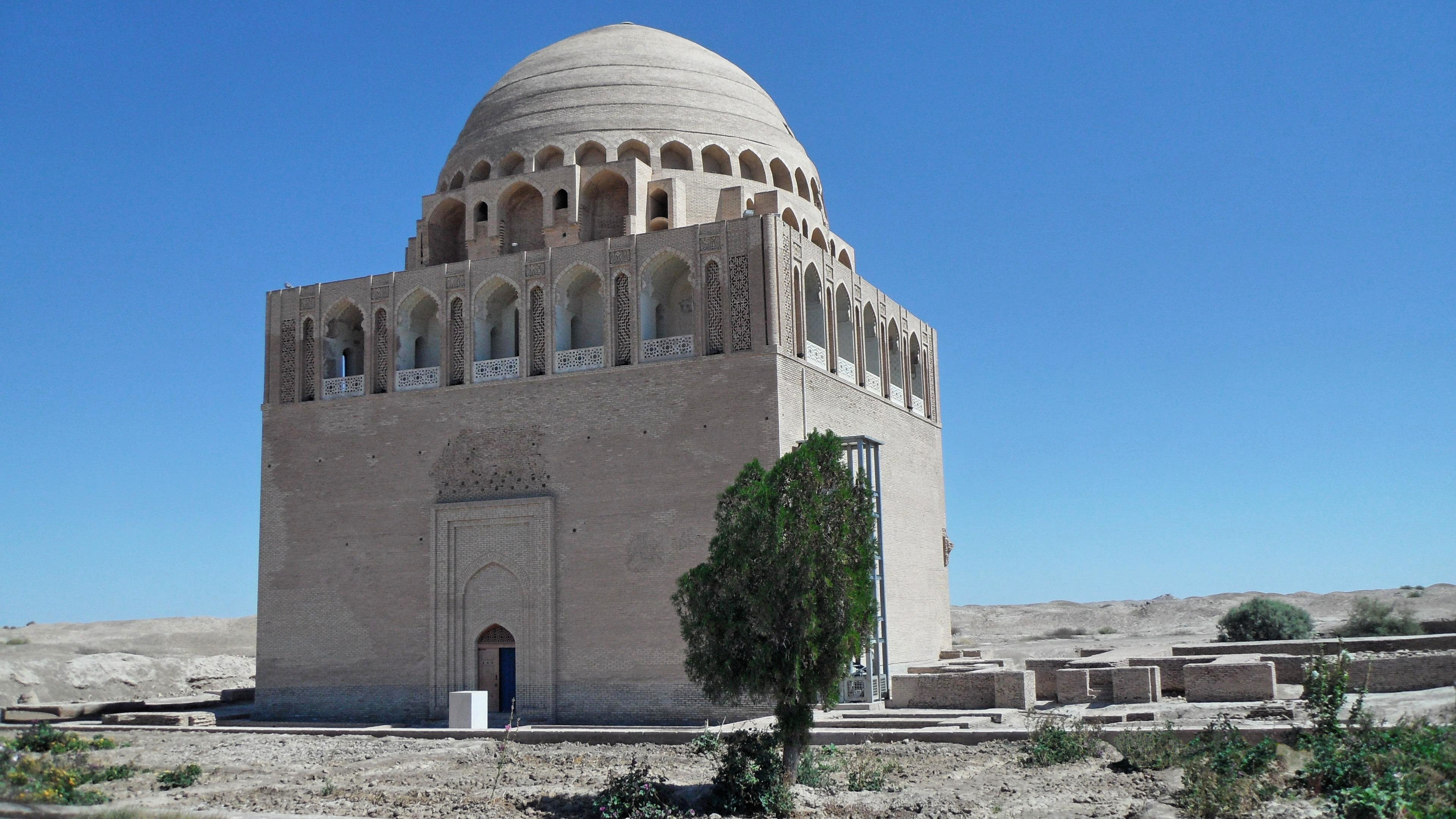
Tomb of Ahmed Sanjar in Merv, Turkmenistan.

The Seljuq Turks built tower tombs, called "Turkish Triangles", as well as cube mausoleums covered with a variety of dome forms. Seljuk domes included conical, semi-circular, and pointed shapes in one or two shells. Shallow semi-circular domes are mainly found from the Seljuk era. The double-shell domes were either discontinuous or continuous. The continuous double-shell domes separated from one another at an angle of 22.5 degrees from their base, such as the dome of the Friday mosque in Ardestan, whereas the discontinuous domes remained completely separate, such as those of the tower tombs of Kharrqan. This pair of brick tower tombs from the 11th century in Kharraqan, Iran, are the earliest known masonry double shell domes. The domes may have been modeled on earlier wooden double shell domes, such as that of the Dome of the Rock. It is also possible, because the upper portions of both of the outer shells are missing, that some portion of the outer domes may have been wooden. These brick mausoleum domes were built without the use of centering, a technique developed in Persia.

The dome of a tomb at Sangbast has been dated to the 11th or 12th century and used brick arranged in a herringbone pattern.

The Seljuq Empire introduced the domed enclosure in front of the mosque's mihrab, which would become popular in Persian congregational mosques, although domed rooms may have also been used earlier in small neighborhood mosques. The domed enclosure of the Jameh Mosque of Isfahan, built in 1086–7 by Nizam al-Mulk, was the largest masonry dome in the Islamic world at that time, had eight ribs, and introduced a new form of corner squinch with two quarter domes supporting a short barrel vault. In 1088 Tāj-al-Molk, a rival of Nizam al-Mulk, built another dome at the opposite end of the same mosque with interlacing ribs forming five-pointed stars and pentagons. This is considered the landmark Seljuk dome, and may have inspired subsequent patterning and the domes of the Il-Khanate period. The five-fold geometry of this design, a spherical dodecahedron, has led to speculation that mathematician Omar Khayyam was involved in the design.

The Jameh Mosque of Zavareh (1135–1136) is the earliest existing example of the standard Iranian mosque type in which four iwans are arranged around a courtyard, with a dome behind the qibla iwan. The layout is found in a group of mosques in the region centered around Isfahan.

The use of tile and of plain or painted plaster to decorate dome interiors, rather than brick, increased under the Seljuks. The Jabal-i Sang was built as an octagonal domed mausoleum with an innovative interior arrangement. One of the largest Seljuq domes, built over the site of a Sassanian Fire Temple, was that of the Jameh Mosque of Qazvin with a span of 15.2 meters. Dating from 1155, the dome interior is decorated with small pieces of turquoise tile set among carved plain brick. The Gunbad-i Surkh in Maragheh was a mausoleum with a square base roofed with two shells. Domed mausoleums in the Greater Khorasan region used a two-story cubic structure covered by domes in two dissimilar shells, with a lack of structural knowledge resulting in damage to the outer pointed dome shells. An anonymous mausoleum and the mausoleum of Sultan Sanjar are examples, before conservation efforts. The largest Seljuq domed chamber was the Tomb of Ahmed Sanjar, which had a large double shell, intersecting ribs over plain squinches, and an exterior elaborately decorated at the zone of transition with arches and stucco work. The tomb of Sultan Sanjar, who reigned from 1117 to 1157, was damaged in the sack of Merv in 1221 by Tolui Khan. The tomb of Yusif ibn Kuseir was built in 1162.

=== Zengid dynasty ===
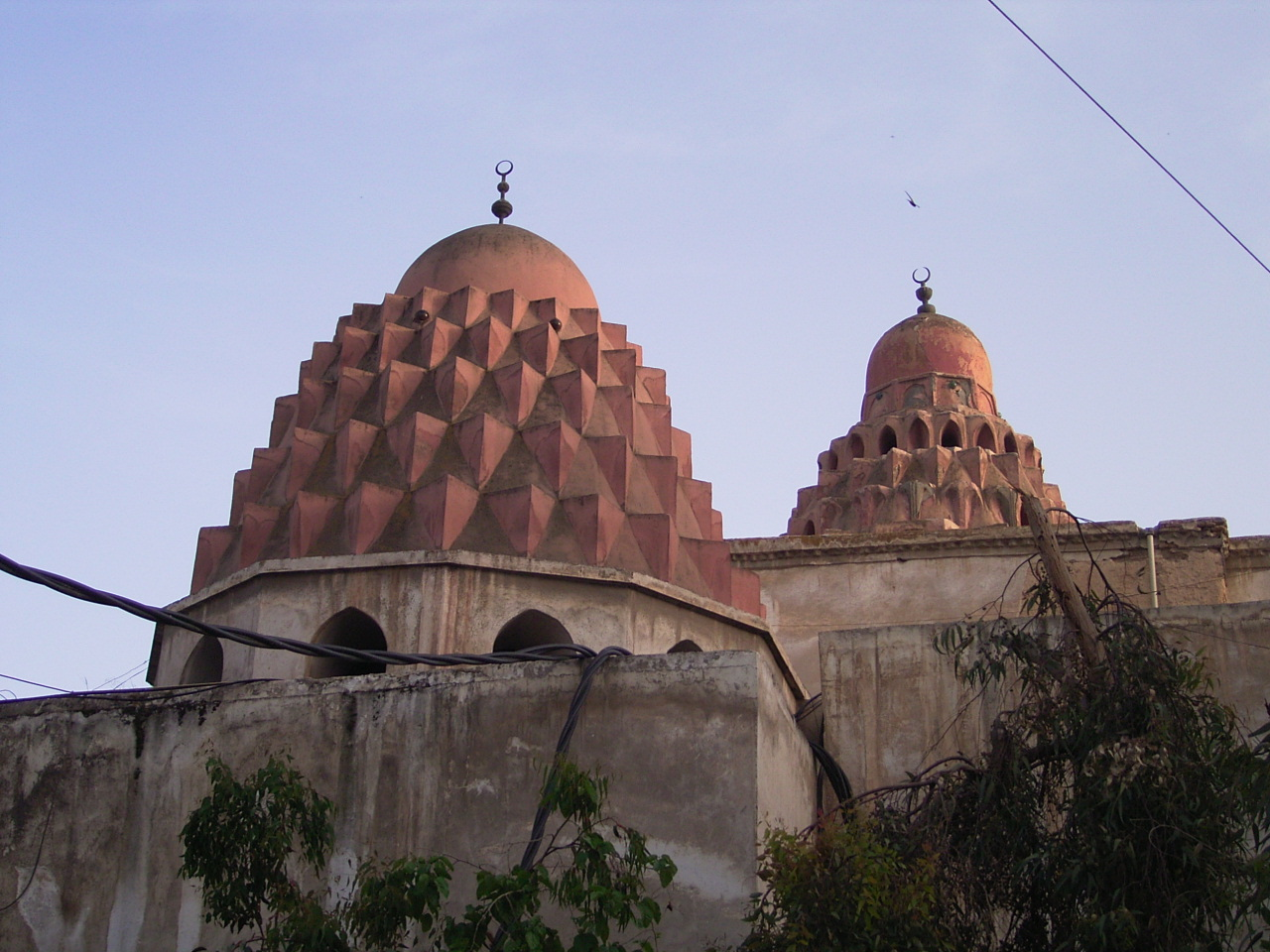
The mausoleum of Nur al-Din in Damascus.

Most of the examples of muqarnas domes are found in Iraq and the Jazira, dated from the middle of the twelfth century to the Mongol invasion. The use of stucco to form the muqarnas pattern, suspended by a wooden framework from the exterior vault, was the least common in Iraq, although it would be very popular in North Africa and Spain. Because it used two shells, however, windows were restricted to the bases of the domes. They were otherwise used frequently in this type. In Iraq, the most common form was a single shell of brick, with the reverse of the interior pattern visible on the exterior. The Damascus mausoleum of Nur al-Din (1172) and the shrine of Zumurrud Khatun in Baghdad are examples. The dome of Nur al-Din was originally hemispherical and similar to those of the mosques of the Artuqids, but it has been replaced with a style of dome similar to those used in local shrines. A third type is found only in Mosul from the beginning of the thirteenth century. It has a brick pyramidal roof, usually covered in green glazed tiles. Of the five preserved examples, the finest is the shrine of Awn al-Din, which used tiny colored tiles to cover the muqarnas cells themselves and incorporates small muqarnas domes into the tiers of muqarnas supporting the large eight-sided star at the center. This design led to a further development at the shrine of Shaykh Abd al-Samad in Natanz, Iran.

The architecture of Syria and the Jazira includes the widest variety of forms in the medieval Islamic world, being influenced by the surviving architecture of Late Antiquity, contemporary Christian buildings, and Islamic architecture from the east. There are some muqarnas domes of the Iraqi type, but most domes are slightly pointed hemispheres on either muqarnas pendentives or double zones of squinches and made of masonry, rather than brick and plaster. The domes cover single bay structures or are just a part of larger constructions. Syrian mausoleums consist of a square stone chamber with a single entrance and a mihrab and a brick lobed dome with two rows of squinches. The dome at the Silvan Mosque, 13.5 meters wide and built from 1152 to 1157, has an unusual design similar to the dome added to the Friday Mosque of Isfahan in 1086-1087: once surrounded by roofless aisles on three sides, it may have been meant to be an independent structure. The congregational mosque at Kızıltepe, with its well integrated dome of about 10 meters, is the masterpiece of Artuqid architecture.

== Khwarazmian Empire ==
The Mausoleum of Fakhreddin Razi in Konye-Urgench, Turkmenistan, was built with a discontinuous double-shell dome with an outer conical shell.

== Mongol Empire ==
=== The Ilkhanate ===
After the disruptive effects of several Mongol invasions, Persian architecture again flourished in the Ilkhanate and Timurid periods. Characteristic of these domes are the use of high drums and several types of discontinuous double-shells, and the development of triple-shells and internal stiffeners occurred at this time. Beginning in the Ilkanate, Persian domes achieved their final configuration of structural supports, zone of transition, drum, and shells, and subsequent evolution was restricted to variations in form and shell geometry. The construction of tomb towers decreased.

The tomb of Ala al-Din was built in 1289. The Shaykh abd al-samad shrine complex was built between 1000 and 1325.

The two major domes of the IlKhanate period are the no-longer-existing mausoleum of Ghazan in Tabriz and the Mausoleum of Öljaitü in Soltaniyeh, the latter having been built to rival the former. Öljaitü was the first sovereign of Persia to declare himself of the Shia sect of Islam and built the mausoleum, with the largest Persian dome, to house the bodies of Ali and Hussein as a pilgrimage site. This did not occur and it became his own mausoleum instead. The dome measures 50 meters high and almost 25 meters in diameter and has the best surviving tile and stucco work from this period. The thin, double-shelled dome was reinforced by arches between the layers. The dome has been proposed as an influence on the design of that of Florence Cathedral, built a century later. The mausoleum is the only remaining important building to survive from Öljaitü's capital city.

Tower tombs of this period, such as the tomb of Abdas-Samad Esfahani in Natanz, sometimes have muqarnas domes, although they are usually plaster shells that hide the underlying structures. The tall proportions of the Jameh Mosque of Varamin resulted primarily from the increased height of the zone of transition, with the addition of a sixteen-sided section above the main zone of muqarnas squinches. The tomb of Hamd-Allah Mustawfi was built around 1340. The 7.5 meter wide double dome of Soltan Bakht Agha Mausoleum (1351–1352) is the earliest known example in which the two shells of the dome have significantly different profiles, which spread rapidly throughout the region. The inner and outer shells had radial stiffeners and struts between them. An early example of a dome chamber almost completely covered with decorative tilework is that of the Jame Mosque of Yazd (1364), as well as several of the mausoleums of Shah-i-Zinda in Samarkand. The development of taller drums also continued into the Timurid period.

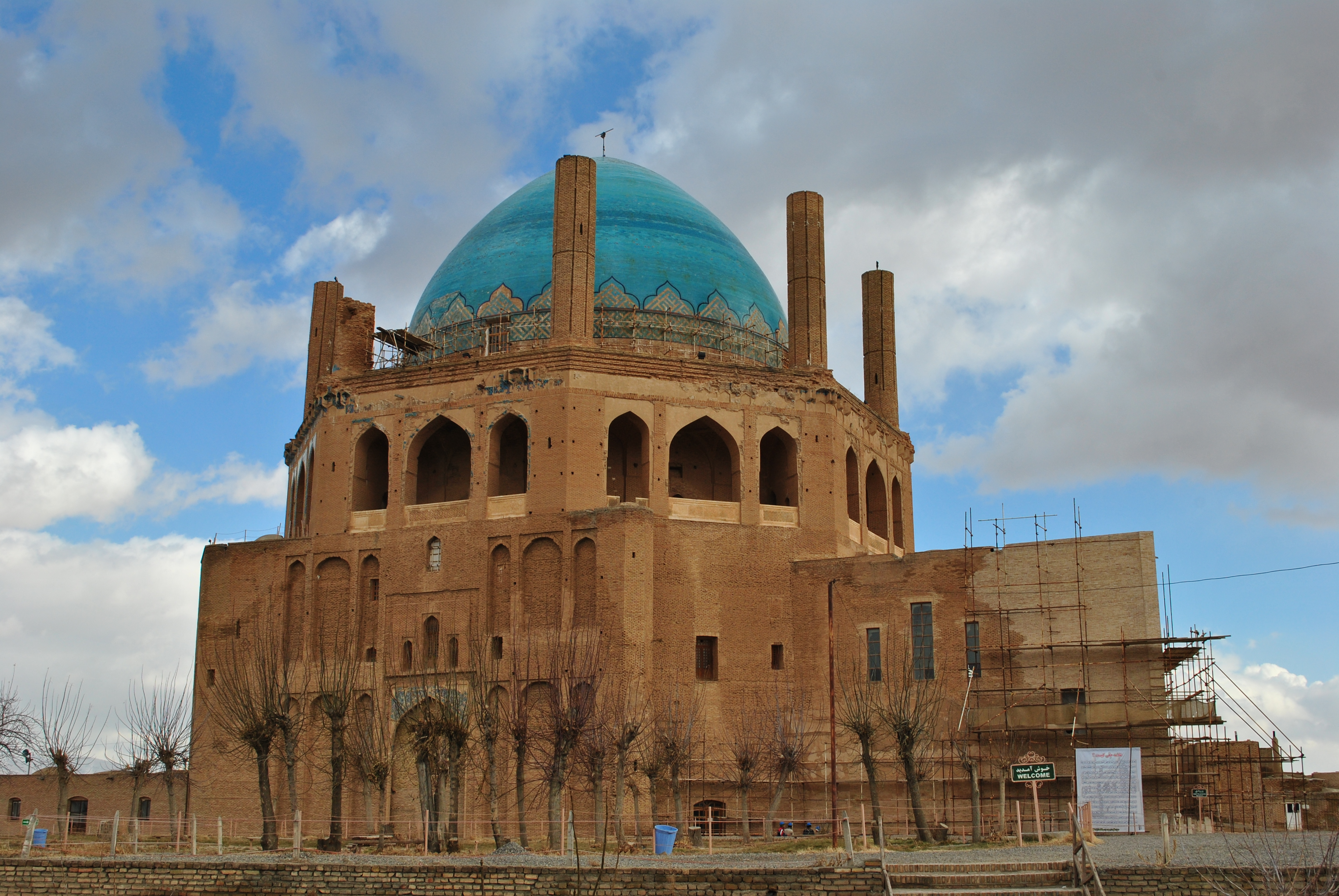
Dome of the Mausoleum of Öljaitü in Soltaniyeh, Iran

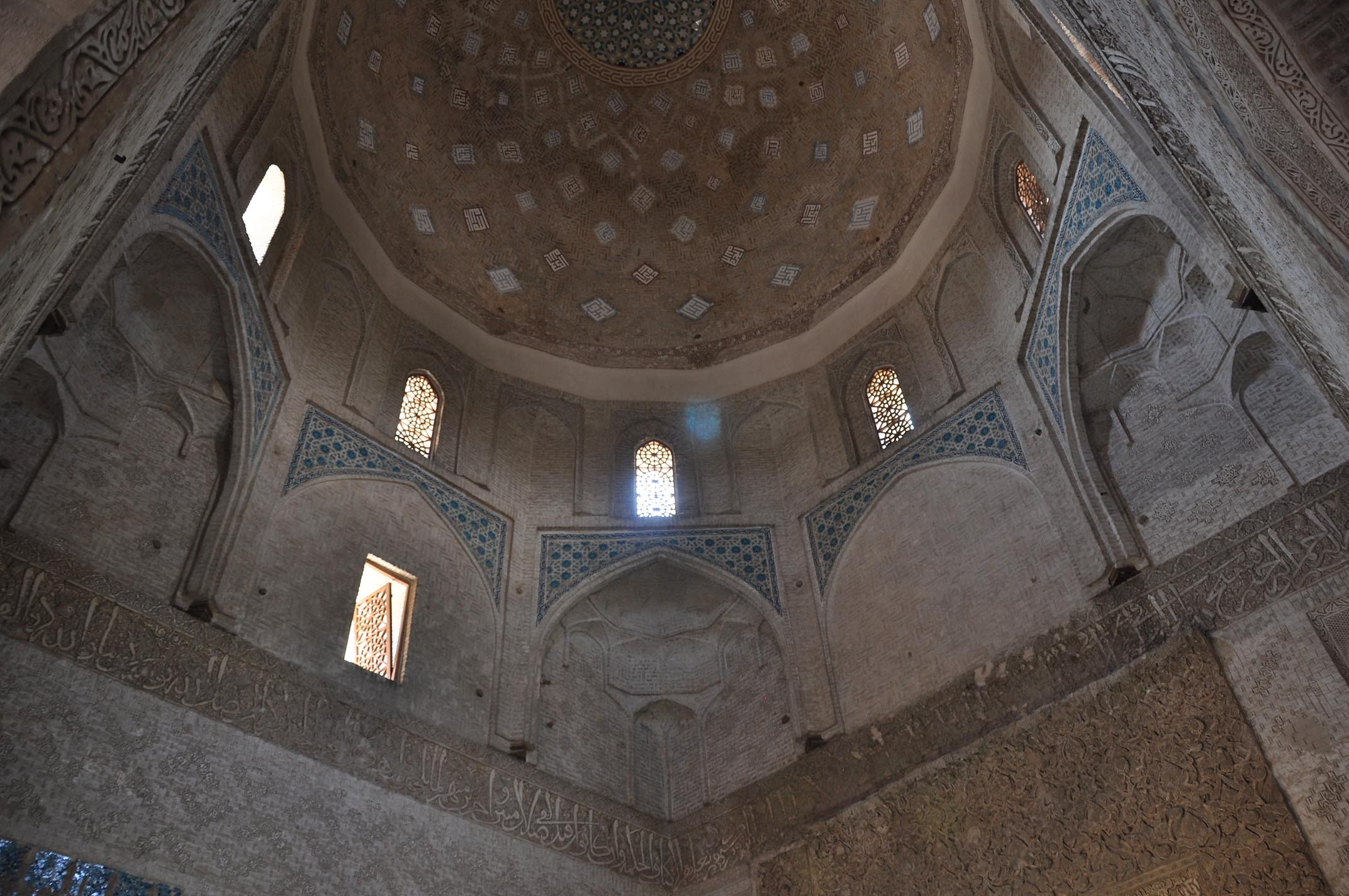
Dome of Jameh Mosque of Varamin, Iran

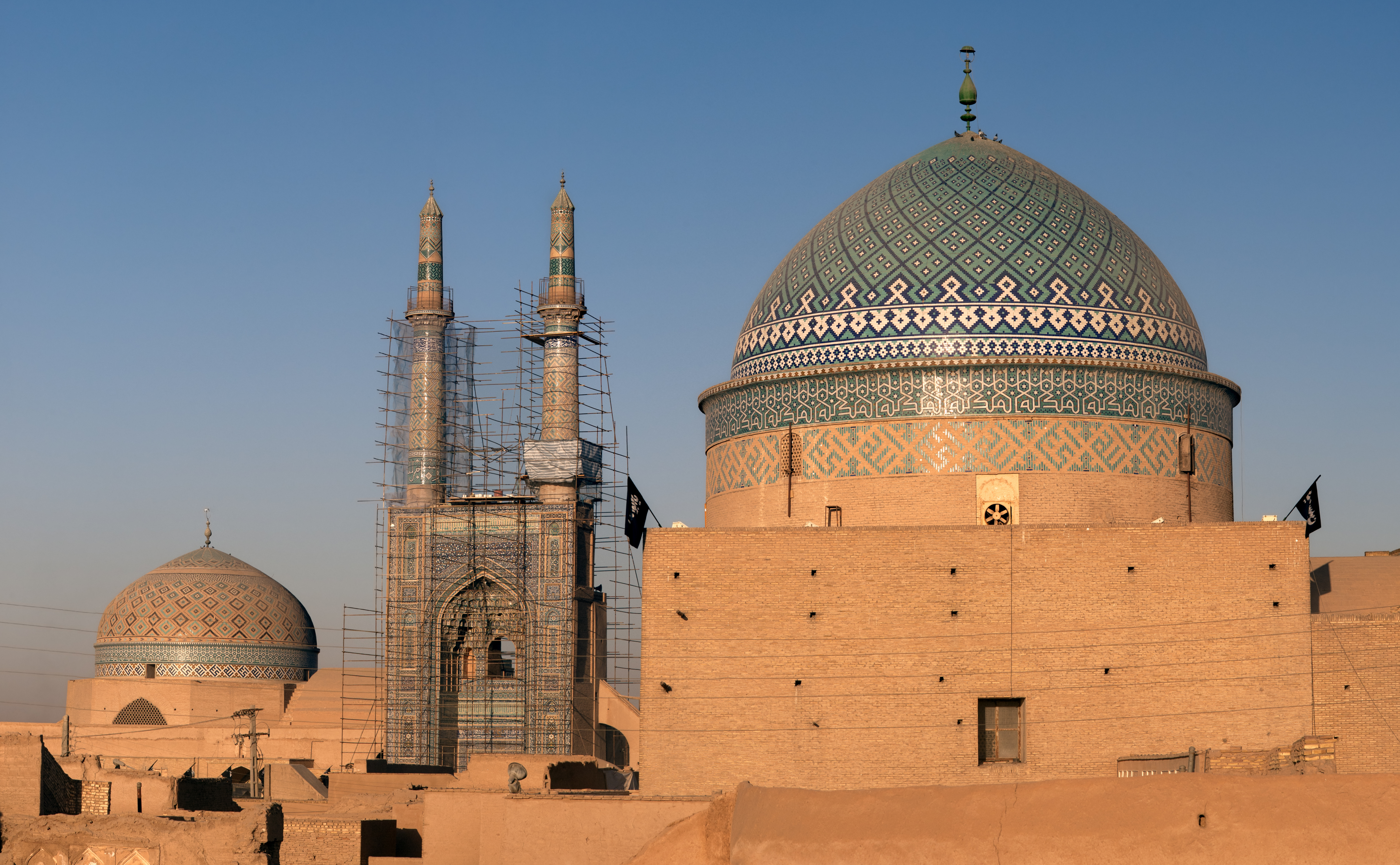
Dome of the Jameh Mosque of Yazd, Iran

== Timurid Empire ==
The mass killings by Mongol and Timurid troops impeded developments in geometry between 1000 and 1400. The mathematician al-Kashi (1390–1450) further developed the Buzjani method for creating a variety of dome configurations using practical geometry. His book, Key of Arithmetic, included five methods of drawing an arch profile and he created methods to calculate the surface areas and volumes of dome shells. They were frequently used in dome design. In the Timurid period, taller domes were built, often as double-shell domes, and melon domes were built in Samarqand, Herat, Balkh, and Kirmān. Muqarnas features held in place by "slats and scaffolding anchored by mortar" were used in the interior to hide the squinches, arches, and vaults actually supporting the domes. The external zone of transition to the dome was reduced or removed, such as stepped features, polygonal drums, and galleries.

Jahangir Mausoleum in Uzbekistan was built in 1400.

At the Timurid capital of Samarkand, nobles and rulers in the 14th and 15th centuries began building tombs with double-shelled domes containing cylindrical masonry drums between the shells. In the Gur-e Amir, built by Timur around 1404, a timber framework on the inner dome supports the outer, bulbous dome. Radial tie-bars at the base of the bulbous dome provide additional structural support. Timber reinforcement rings and rings of stone linked by iron cramps were also used to compensate for the structural problems introduced by using such drums. Radial sections of brick walls with wooden struts were used between the shells of discontinuous double domes to provide structural stability as late at the 14th century.

The large dome of Bibi-Khanym Mosque in Samarkand was damaged by an earthquake during Timur's lifetime. It was built between 1398 and 1405.

An account by ambassador Ruy González de Clavijo describes a huge square Timurid pavilion tent with a dome at the top that resembled a castle from a distance due to its size. It measured one hundred paces on a side and was assembled from tall wooden masts stayed by ropes, with silk curtains between them. The tent had four archways and was surrounded by a lower attached portico or gallery on all four sides. An illustration from the Cairo Būstān shows a garden pavilion with Sultan Husayn Bayqara seated under an embroidered dome and awning.

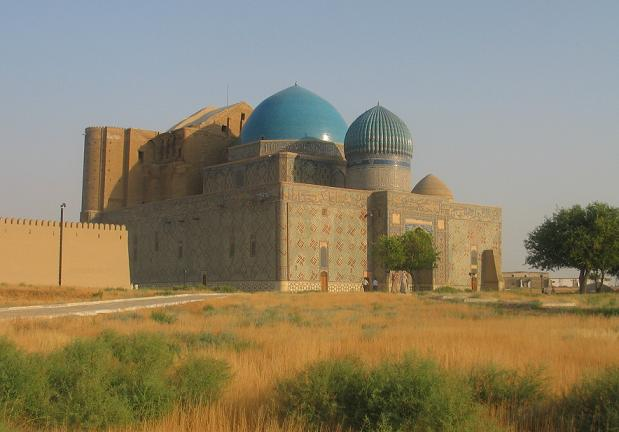
The Mausoleum of Khoja Ahmed Yasawi in Turkistan, Kazakhstan.

A miniature painted at Samarkand shows that bulbous cupolas were used to cover small wooden pavilions in Persia by the beginning of the 15th century. They gradually gained in popularity. The large, bulbous, fluted domes on tall drums that are characteristic of 15th century Timurid architecture were the culmination of the Central Asian and Iranian tradition of tall domes with glazed tile coverings in blue and other colors. The Mausoleum of Khoja Ahmed Yasawi, situated in southern Kazakhstan was never finished, but has the largest existing brick dome in Central Asia, measuring 18.2 m in diameter. The dome exterior is covered with hexagonal green glazed tiles with gold patterns.

In Afghanistan, Timurid ribbed domes with glazed tiles began to be built in the 1420s.

The tomb of Ghiyath al-Din Naqqash in Bust has a dome that used exposed brick placed in alternating bands of horizontal and vertical orientations for decorative effect.

Mausoleums were rarely built as free-standing structures after the 14th century, being instead often attached to madrasas in pairs. Domes of these madrasas, such as those of the madrasa of Gawhar Shad (1417–1433) and the madrasa at Ḵargerd (1436–1443), had dramatically innovative interiors. They used intersecting arches to support an inner dome narrower than the floor below, a change that may have originated with the 14th century use of small lantern domes over transverse vaulting. The madrasa of Gawhar Shad is also the first triple-shell dome. The middle dome may have been added as reinforcement. Triple-shelled domes are rare outside of the Timurid era. The dome of the Amir Chakhmaq mosque (1437) has a semi-circular inner shell and an advanced system of stiffeners and wooden struts supporting a shallow pointed outer shell. Notably, the dome has a circular drum with two tiers. Another double shell dome from the early Seljuq period at the shrine complex of Bayazid Bastami was changed in the Timurid period in 1300 by the addition of a third conical shell over the existing two domed shells.

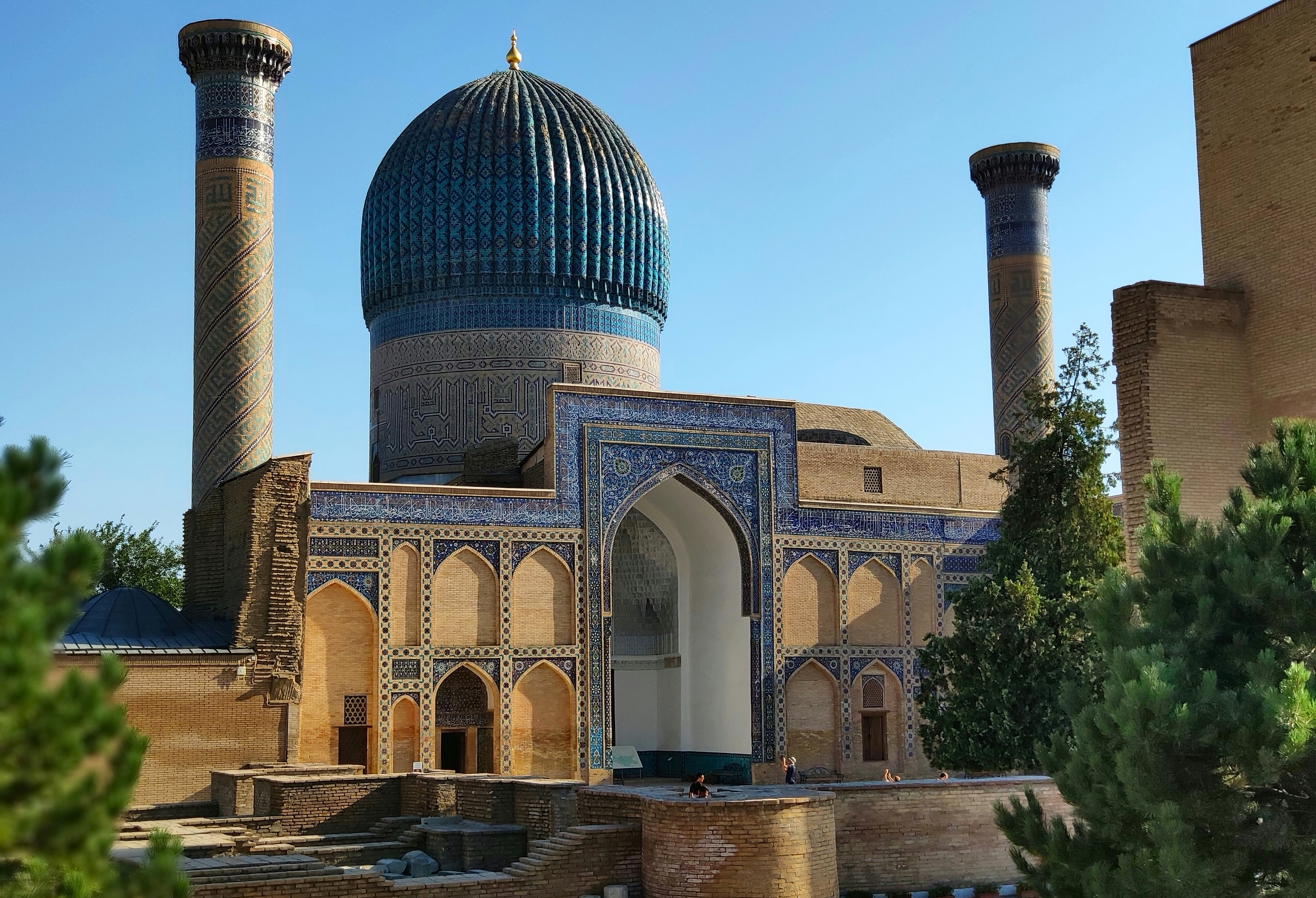
Gur-e-Amir Mausoleum in Samarkand

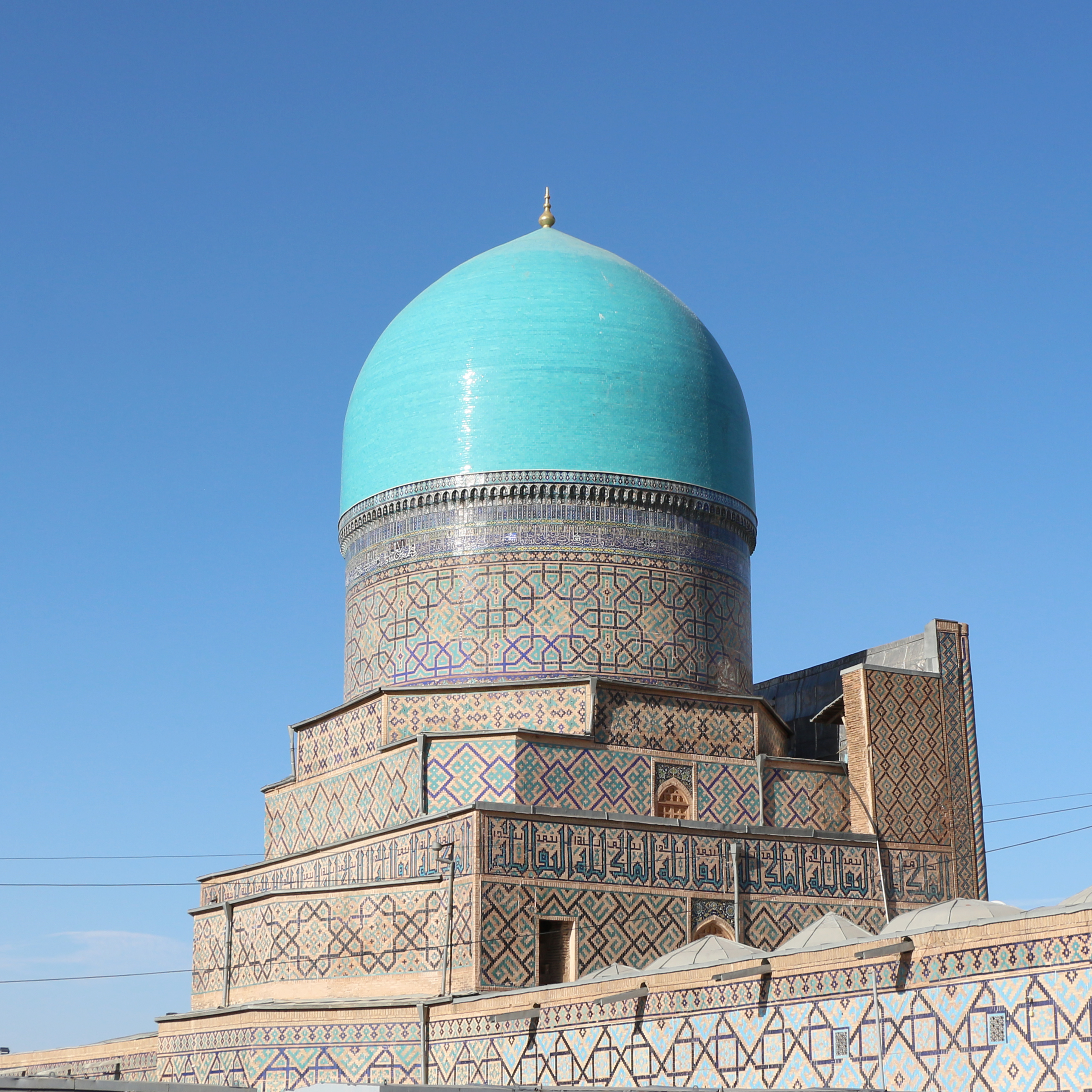
Tilakari Madrasa and Mosque in Samarkand

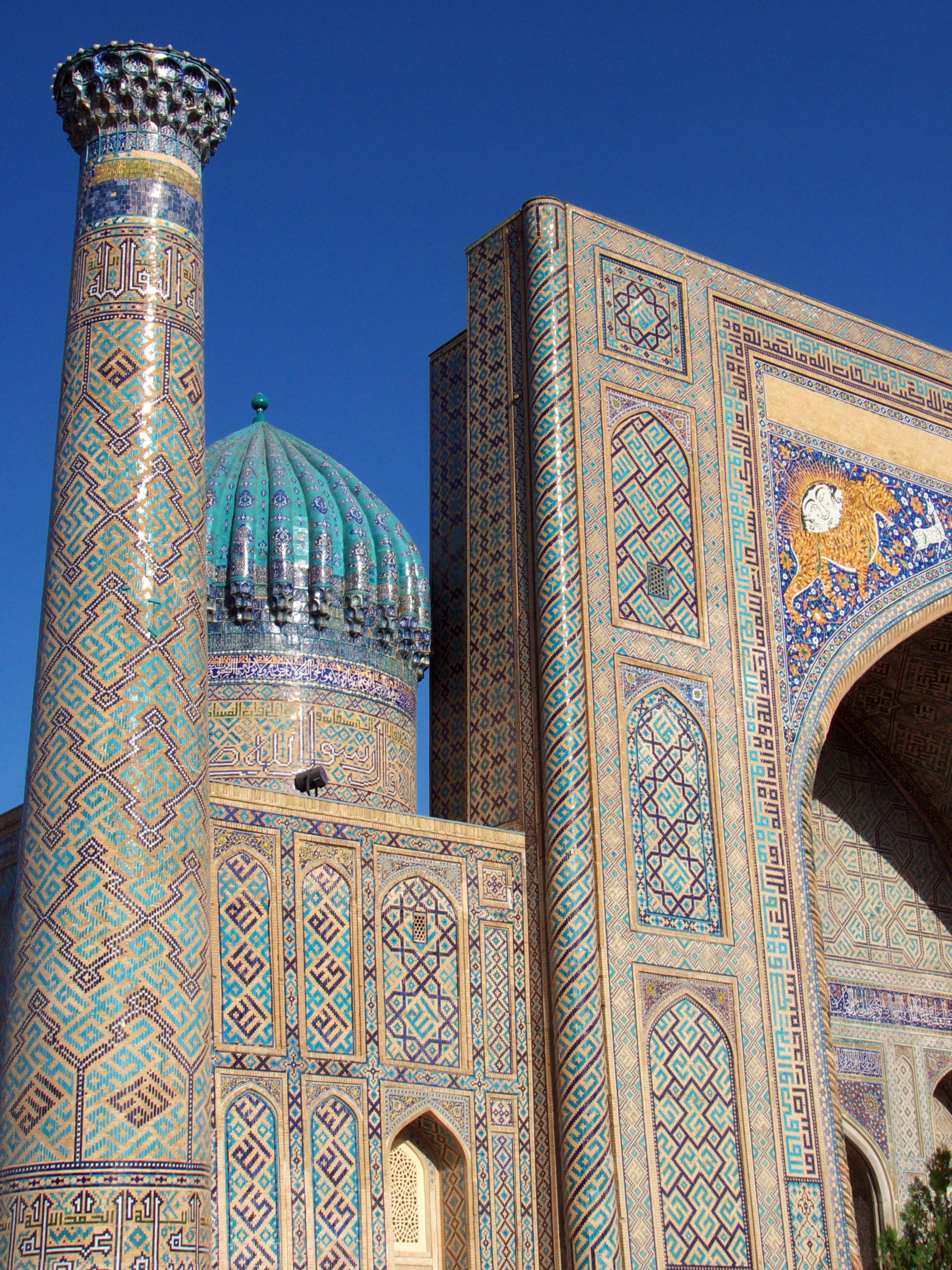
Sherdar Madrasa in Samarkand

== Safavid Iran ==
The domes of the Safavid dynasty (1501–1732) are characterized by a distinctive bulbous profile and are considered to be the last generation of Persian domes. They are generally thinner than earlier domes and are decorated with a variety of colored glazed tiles and complex vegetal patterns. A popular feature of Safavid architecture was the inclusion of symmetrical pairs of key elements, including dome chambers. Extensive and colorful tilework was used in this period, including floral and arabesque patterns on dome exteriors, enabled by the use of less expensive large square underglaze-painted tiles that were not dependent on firing special glazes at the optimum temperature in order to achieve the coloration. Small scale domes were included in palace architecture, utility structures, and caravanserais.

The dome of the Blue Mosque in Tabriz (1465) had its interior covered with "dark-blue hexagonal tiles with stenciled gilding". The palace of Ālī Qāpū includes small domed rooms decorated with artificial vegetation.

The removal of thousands of Armenian Christians to the Isfahan suburb city of New Julfa by Shah Abbas resulted in the "unusual sight of Ṣafawid-style domes topped by a cross" in that city.

The dome of Sheikh Lotfollah Mosque in Isfahan (1603–1618), perhaps "the quintessential Persian dome chamber", blends the square room with the zone of transition and uses plain squinches like those of the earlier Seljuq period. On the exterior, multiple levels of glazed arabesque are blended with an unglazed brick background. The domes of the Shah Mosque (later renamed the Imam Mosque) and the Mādar-e Šāh madrasa (1706–1714) have a similar exterior pattern against a background of light blue glazed tile. The bulbous dome of the Shah Mosque was built from 1611 to 1638 and is a discontinuous double-shell 33 meters wide and 52 meters high. The octagonal mausoleum of Khwaja Rabi (1617–1622) uses the oldest version of the Safavid onion dome type. The tomb of Amin-edin Jabrail, begun in 1380, was completed around 1700.

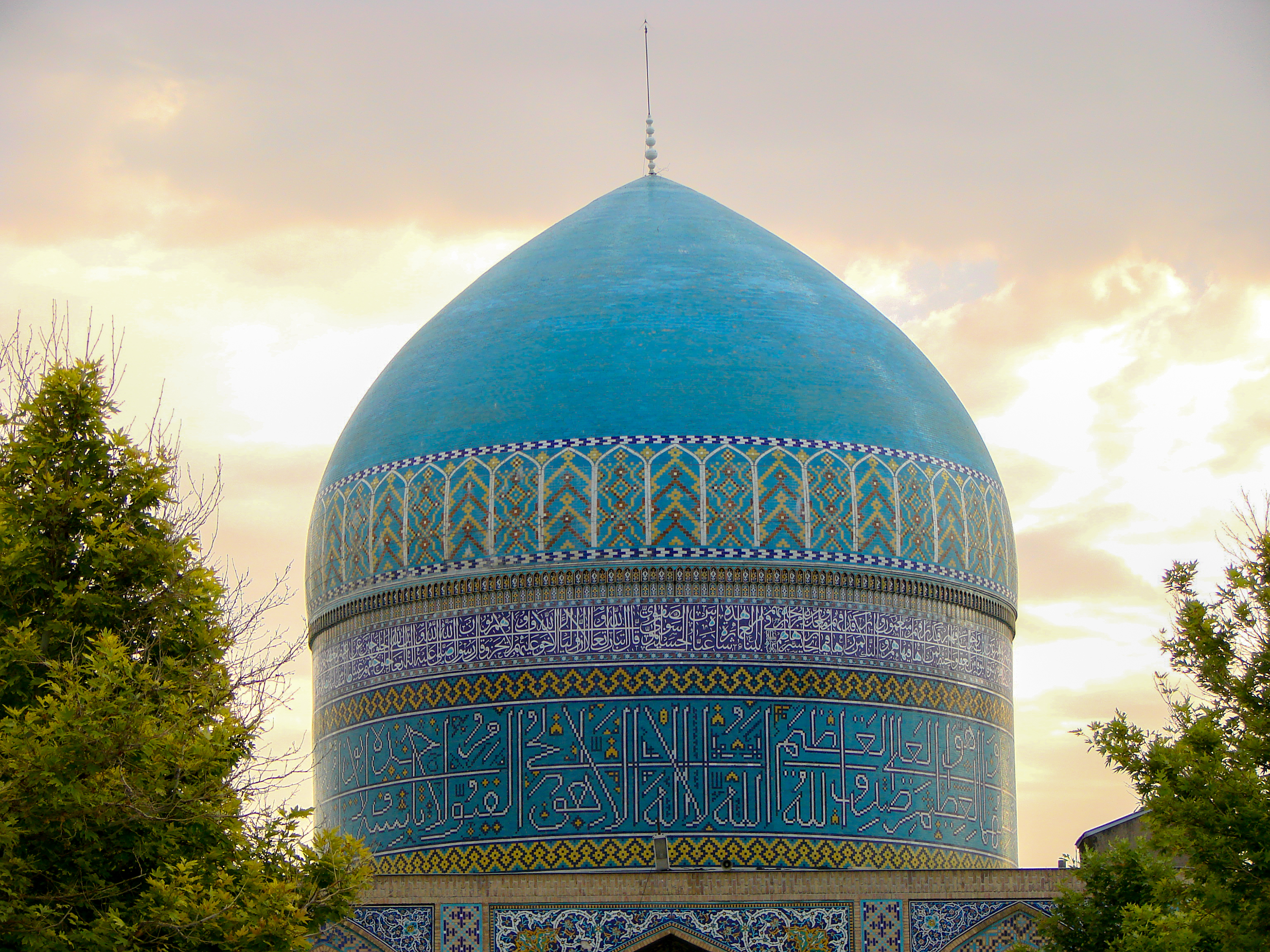
Tomb of Khajeh Rabie in Mashhad, Iran

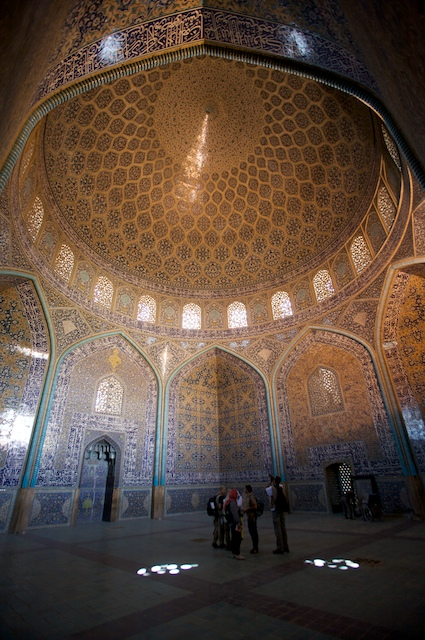
The Sheikh Lotfollah Mosque in Isfahan, Iran

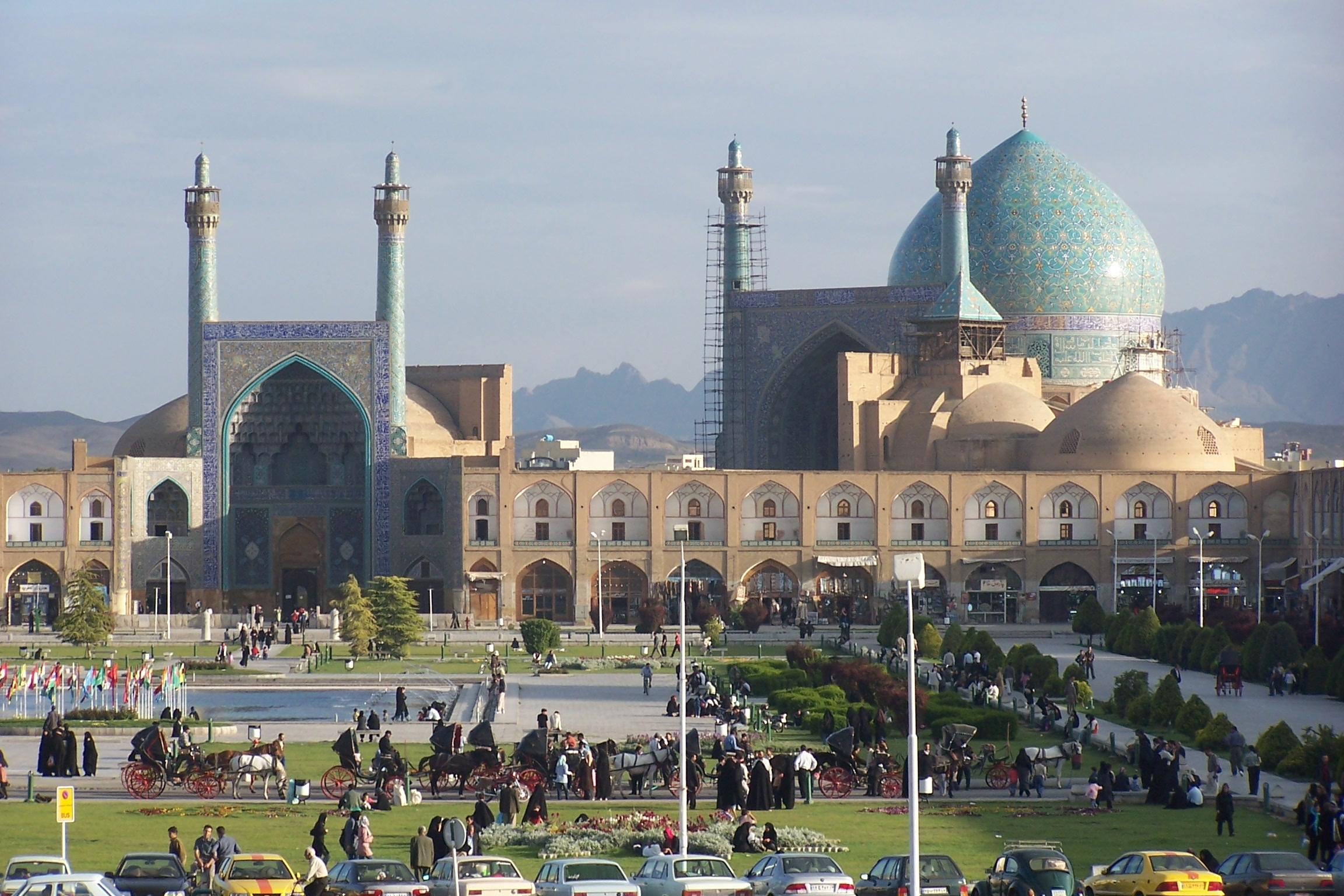
Dome of the Shah Mosque (Isfahan), Iran

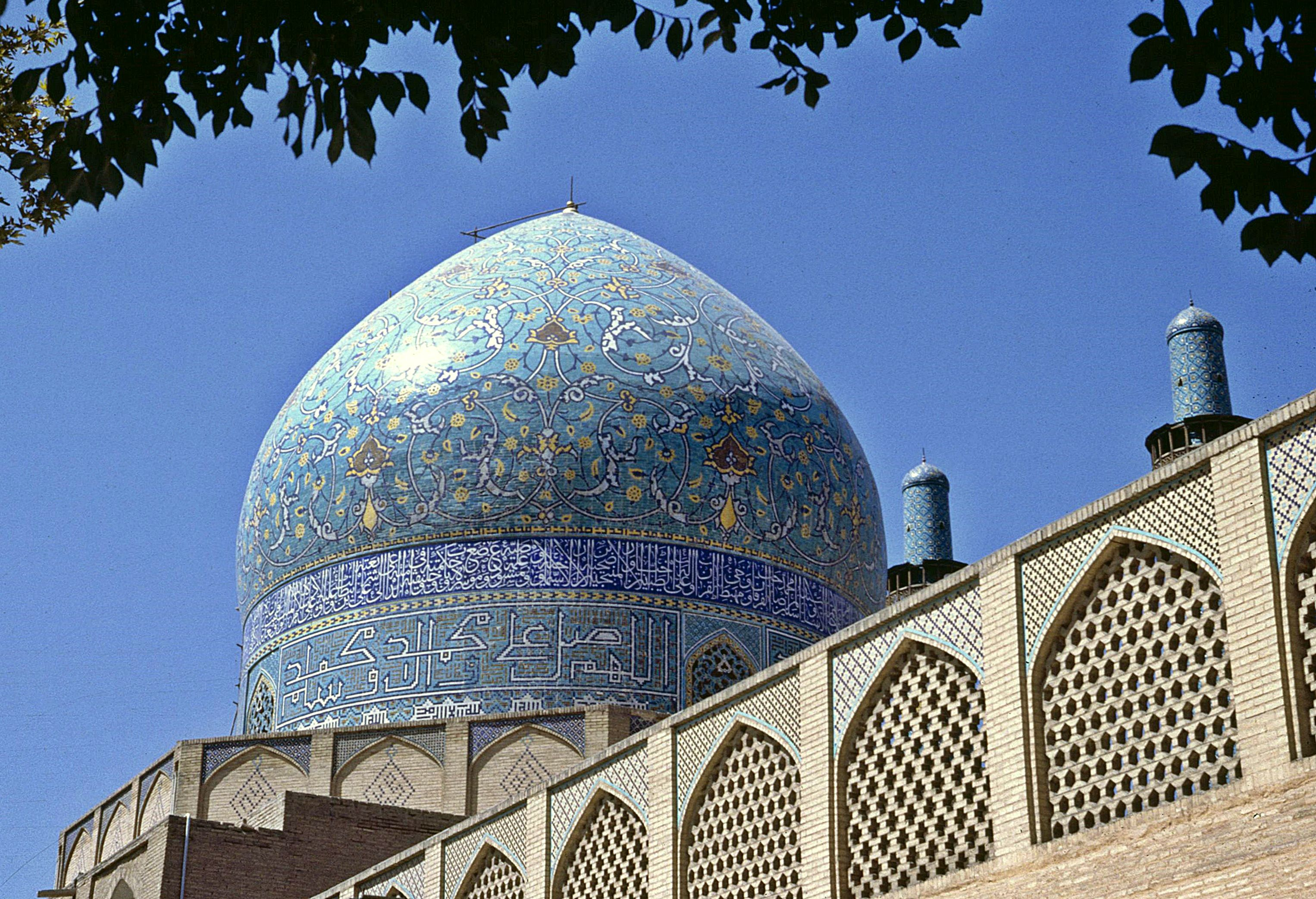
Mādar-e Šāh madrasa in Isfahan, Iran

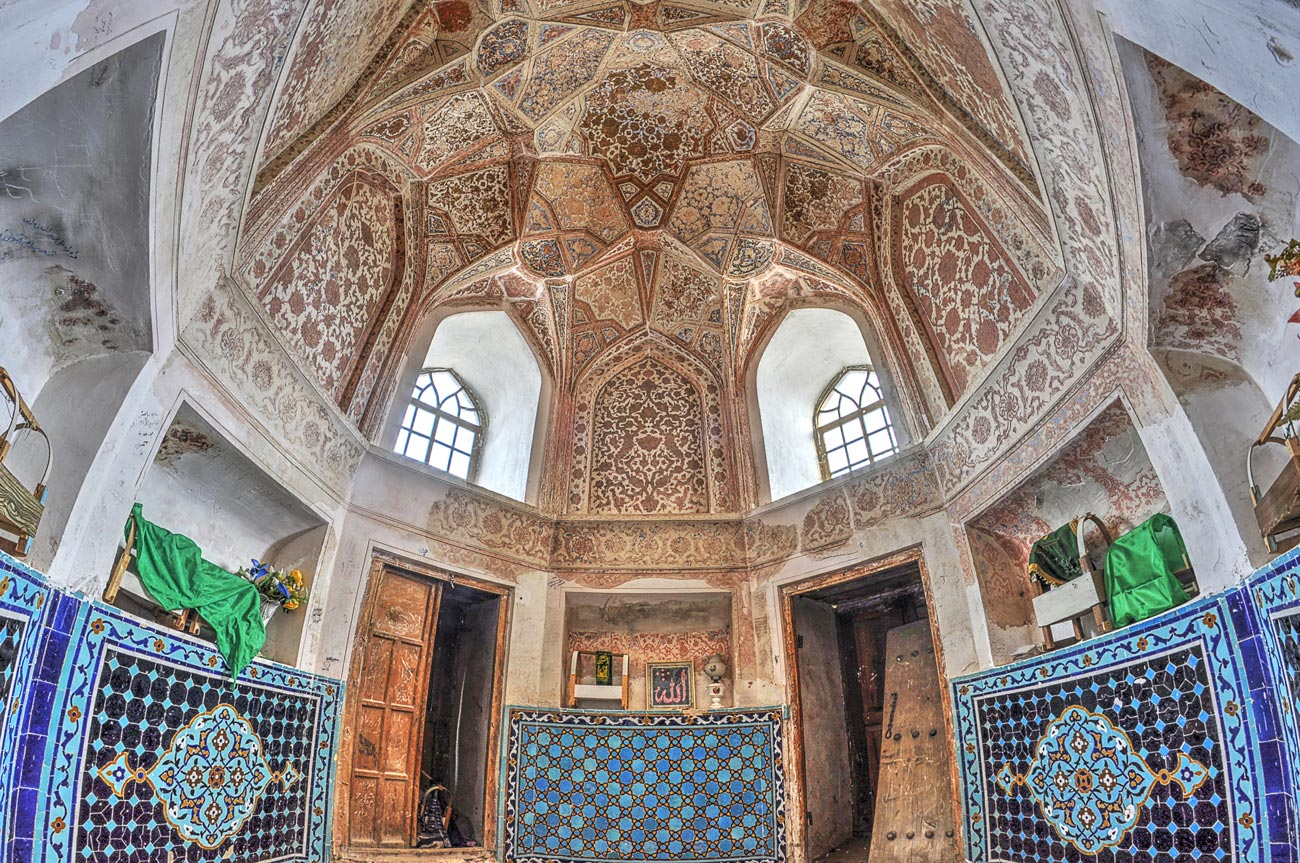
The tomb of Amin-edin Jabrail in Kalkhuran Sheykh, Iran

== Qajar Iran ==
Fath-Ali Shah Qajar built a series of mosques named "Masjid-i Shāh" at Qazvin (1808), Zanjan, Semnan (1827), Tehran (1840), and Borujerd. They include a network of small domes and windows to provide light to the interior. Palace gardens included open-plan domed pavilions. Safavid examples were expanded or imitated, as in the golden domes at Qom, Ray, and Mashhad.

The movement to modern architecture meant less innovation in dome construction. Domes were built over madrasas, such as the 1848 Imam madrasa, or Sultani school, of Kashan, but they have relatively simple appearances and do not use tiled mosaics.

The covered markets or bazaars (tīmcās) at Qom and Kashan feature a central dome with smaller domes on either side and elaborate muqarnas. An exaggerated style of onion dome on a short drum, as can be seen at the Shah Cheragh (1852–1853), first appeared in the Qajar period. Domes have remained important in modern mausoleums, such as the tombs of Ḥāfeẓ, Saʿdī, Reza Shah, and Ruhollah Khomeini in the twentieth century. Domed cisterns and icehouses remain common sights in the countryside.

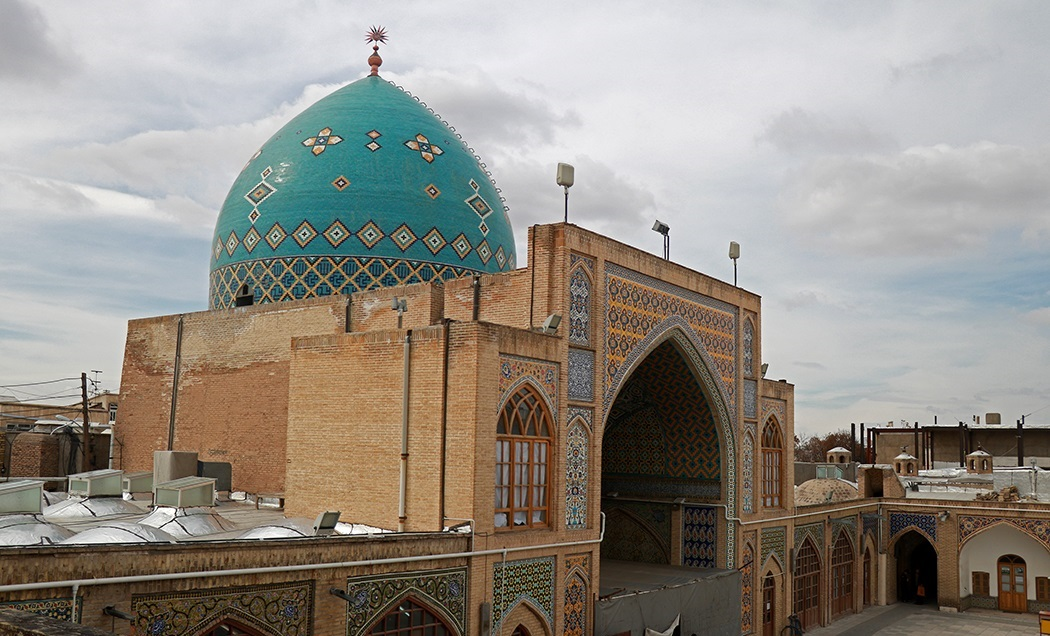
Masjid-i Shāh in Zanjan

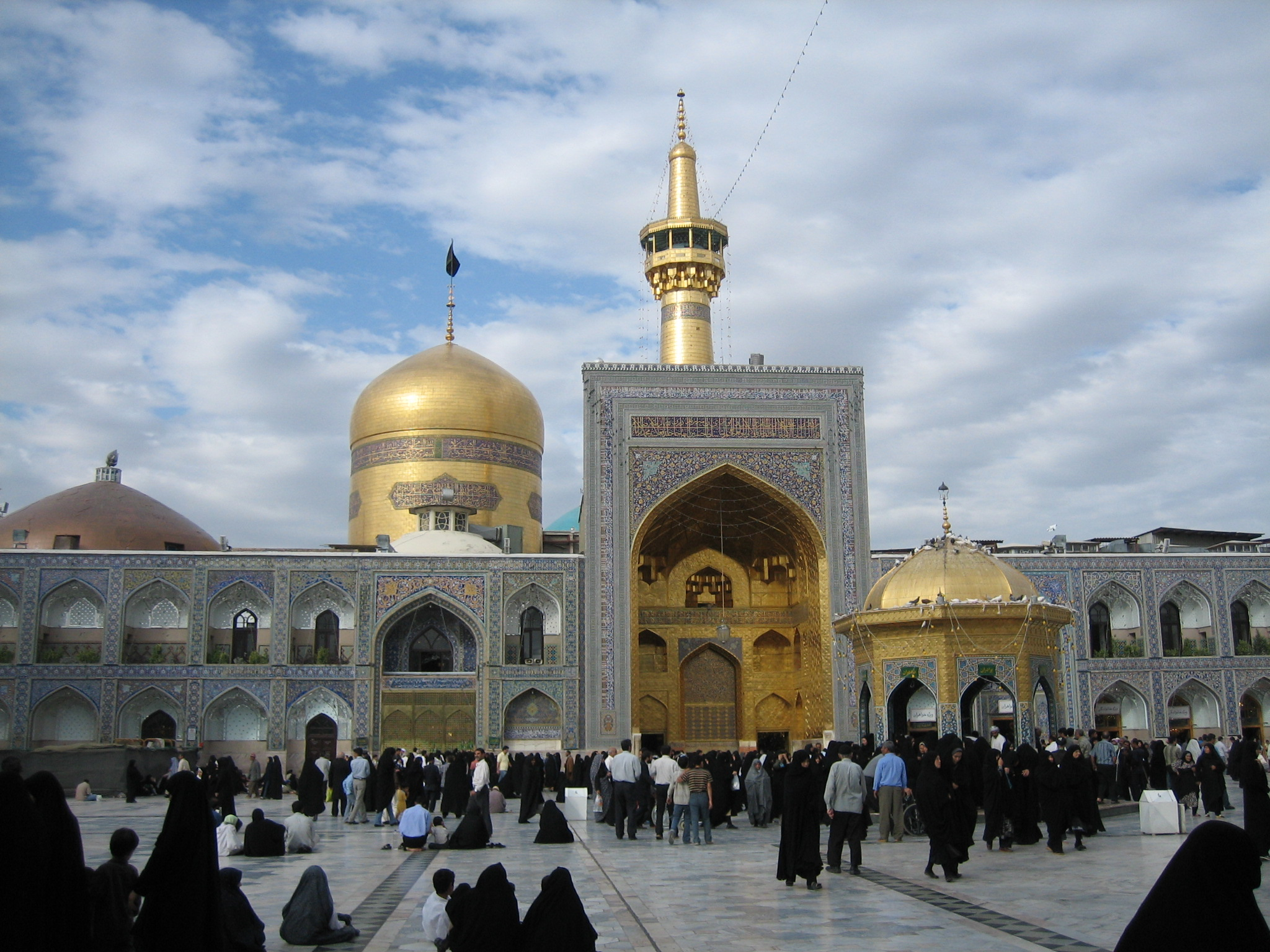
Dome of the Imam Reza shrine

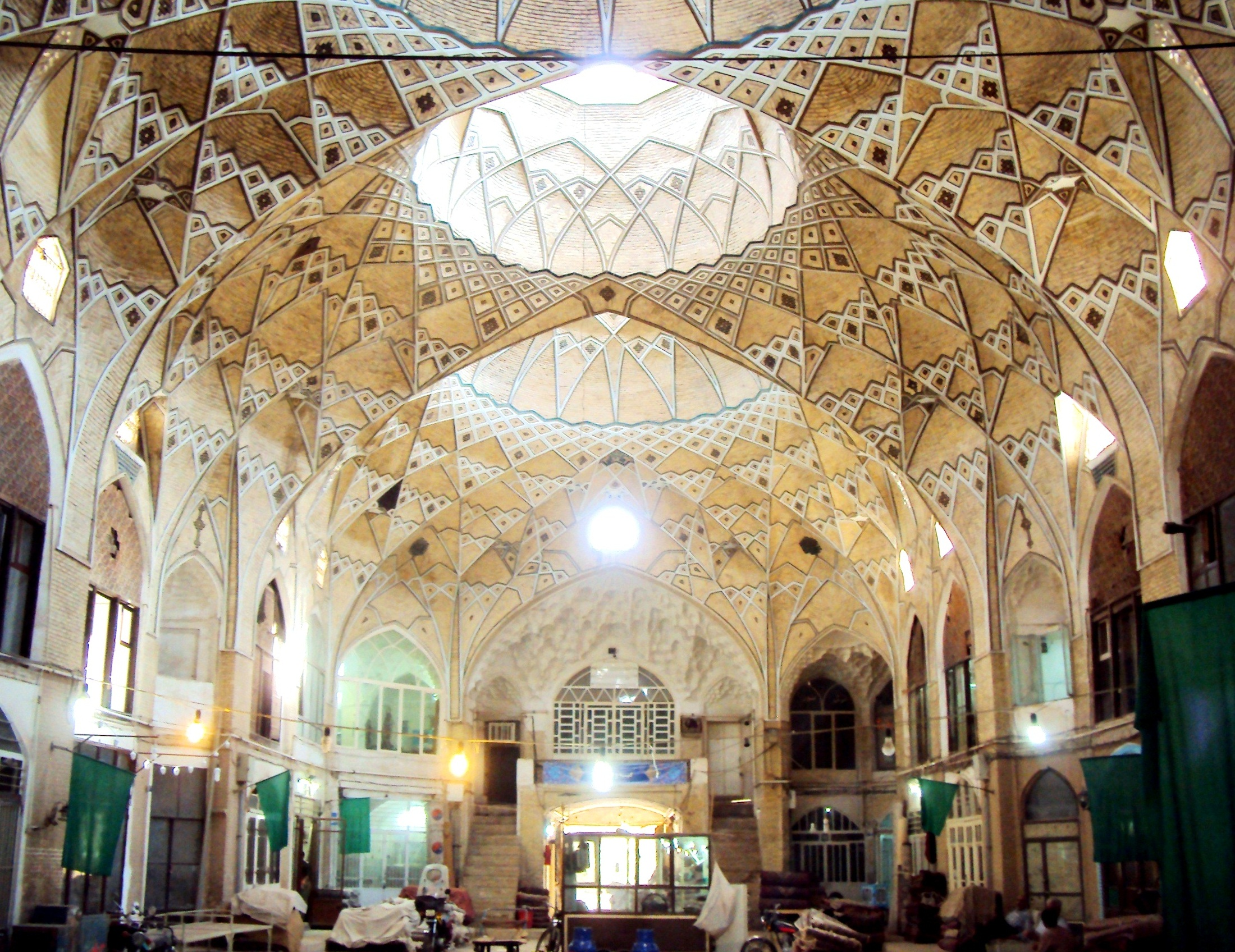
Domes in the bazaar of Qom, Iran

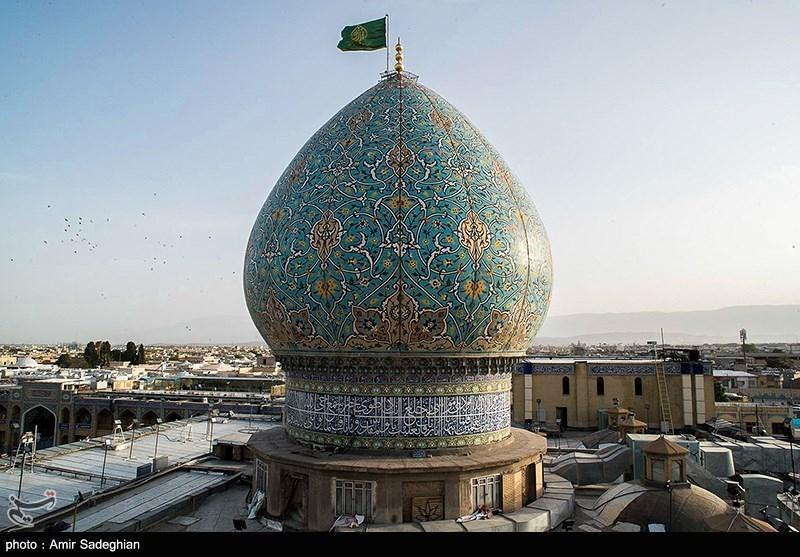
Dome of Shah Cheragh in Shiraz, Iran

== Influence ==
The Melik Gazi tomb in Turkey was built in 1200.

The Sultanate of Rum decorated their domes largely with patterns of interlocking bricks in the Persian tradition. Patterns included rotated bricks or whirling rosettes, which could include glazed bricks of black or turquoise color. The Ulu Mosque of Malatya (1247) used turquoise glazed bricks spaced between plain bricks to create a spiral pattern on the spherical surface, following 41 rhumb lines or loxodromes, that changes to a different alternating pattern near the top. The spherical dome of Karatay Madrasa (1251–1253) was decorated with a mosaic of glazed tiles in an intricate geometric pattern that may have been applied a section at a time in polyhedral panels. Other patterns, such as concentric 10-pointed stars, were created by alternating horizontally-oriented plain bricks with glazed bricks rotated 90 degrees. The dome of Taş (Alaaddin) Mosque (1258) in Çay, Afyon, used diamonds and a 16-pointed concentric star pattern. The domes of Ince Minaret Madrasa (1264–1265) and Eşrefoğlu Mosque (1297–1301) used small spiral segments to create patterned motifs. The patterned dome at Sâhip 'Ata Külliyesi was built between 1279 and 1280. Döner Kümbet was a cylindrical mausoleum with two shells: a dome and a conical roof.

The Tomb of Turabek Khanum (1369) used a discontinuous double-shell dome.

After the Timurid period, dome architecture was developed in local styles of the Shaybanids of Central Asia and the Mughals of India. The Shaybanid Tilakari Madrasa was built between 1646 and 1660. The Kalan Mosque (c. 1514) and Mir-i Arab Madrassah (1535–1536) are other Shaybanid examples. The Uzbek architecture of the region around Transoxiana maintained the Timurid style of dome-building. Where dome chambers were surrounded by axial iwans and corner rooms on an octagonal plan, as at the Khwaja Abu Nasr Parsa shrine (ca. 1598), they provided the model for Indian mausoleums such as Humayun's Tomb in Delhi or the Taj Mahal. Some of the earliest surviving domed markets, called tīmcās, can be found in Shaybanid-era Bukhara. Safavid domes were also influential on those of other Islamic styles, such as the Mughal architecture of India. The influence of Persian architecture in India, particularly in mosques, increased during the Delhi Sultanate and reached a peak during the Mughal Empire. Persian dome chambers and use of double-shelled domes had a significant influence.

== Bibliography ==
- Almagro Gorbea, Antonio (1987), "Origins and Repercussions of the Architecture of the Umayyad Palace in Amman" (PDF), Dirāsāt Fī Tārīḫ Wa-āṯār Al-Urdunn, Volume 3: Papers of the 3rd International Conference on the History and Archaeology of Jordan, Amman, pp. 181–192
- Arce, Ignacio (2008), "Umayyad building techniques and the merging of Roman‐Byzantine and Partho‐Sassanian traditions: Continuity and change" (PDF), in Lavan, Luke; Zanini, Enrico; Sarantis, Alexander (eds.), Technology in Transition A.D. 300-650, Late Antique Archaeology, vol. 4, Brill, pp. 491–537, ISBN 978-90-47-43304-0
- Ashkan, Maryam; Ahmad, Yahaya (2012). "Significance of conical and polyhedral domes in Persia and surrounding areas: morphology, typologies and geometric characteristics". Nexus Network Journal. Persian Architecture and Mathematics (275–290).
- Ashkan, Maryam; Ahmad, Yahaya (November 2009). "Persian Domes: History, Morphology, and Typologies". Archnet-IJAR (International Journal of Architectural Research). 3 (3): 98–115. Archived from the original on 2015-04-02.
- Ashkan, Maryam; Ahmad, Yahaya (2010). "Discontinuous Double-shell Domes through Islamic eras in the Middle East and Central Asia: History, Morphology, Typologies, Geometry, and Construction" (PDF). Nexus Network Journal. 12 (2). Turin, Italy: Kim Williams Books: 287–319. doi:10.1007/s00004-010-0013-9.
- Blair, Sheila S. (1983). "The Octagonal Pavilion at Natanz: A Reexamination of Early Islamic Architecture in Iran". Muqarnas. 1. Brill: 69–94. doi:10.2307/1523072. JSTOR 1523072.
- Bloom, Jonathan M.; Blair, Sheila S., eds. (2009). Grove Encyclopedia of Islamic Art & Architecture: Three-Volume Set. Oxford University Press. ISBN 978-0-19-530991-1.
- Born, Wolfgang (April 1944). "The Introduction of the Bulbous Dome into Gothic Architecture and its Subsequent Development". Speculum. 19 (2). Medieval Academy of America: 208–221. doi:10.2307/2849071. JSTOR 2849071.
- Canepa, Matthew P. (2013), "The Transformation of Sacred Space, Topography, and Royal Ritual in Persia and the Ancient Iranian World" (PDF), in Deena Ragavan (ed.), Heaven on Earth: Temples, Ritual, and Cosmic Symbolism in the Ancient World, Oriental Institute of the University of Chicago, pp. 319–372
- Creswell, K. A. C. (January 1915). "Persian Domes before 1400 A.D.". The Burlington Magazine for Connoisseurs. 26 (142). The Burlington Magazine Publications, Ltd.: 146–155. JSTOR 859853.
- Creswell, K. A. C. (February 1915). "Persian Domes before 1400 A.D. (conclusion)". The Burlington Magazine for Connoisseurs. 26 (143). The Burlington Magazine Publications, Ltd.: 208–213. JSTOR 859962.
- Gentry, T. Russell; Lesniewski, Anatoliusz "Tolek" (2011). "Structural Design and Construction of Brunelleschi's Duomo di Santa Maria del Fiore". Eleventh North American Masonry Conference (NAMC). Minneapolis, Minnesota. June 5–8, 2011 (PDF).
- Gonzalo, José Carlos Palacios; Alkadi, Rana Munir (2018). "Muqarnas Domes and Cornices in the Maghreb and Andalusia" (PDF). Nexus Network Journal. 20 (1). Springer: 95–123. doi:10.1007/s00004-017-0367-3.
- Grabar, Oleg (December 1963). "The Islamic Dome, Some Considerations" (PDF). Journal of the Society of Architectural Historians. 22 (4): 191–198. doi:10.2307/988190. JSTOR 988190.
- Grabar, Oleg (March 1990). "From Dome of Heaven to Pleasure Dome". Journal of the Society of Architectural Historians. 49 (1). Berkeley, CA: University of California Press: 15–21. doi:10.2307/990496. JSTOR 990496.
- Hasan, Shaikh Khurshid (June 2001). "Pakistan: Its Seraiki Style of Tomb Architecture". East and West. 51 (1/2). Istituto Italiano per l'Africa e l'Oriente (IsIAO): 167–178. JSTOR 29757500.
- Hillenbrand, R. (1989). "Architecture". In Ferrier, Ronald W. (ed.). The Arts of Persia (unabridged ed.). Yale University Press. pp. 81–108. ISBN 978-0-300-03987-0.
- Lehmann, Karl (1989) [1st Pub. 1945], "The Dome of Heaven", in Kleinbauer, W. Eugène (ed.), Modern Perspectives in Western Art History: An Anthology of Twentieth-Century Writings on the Visual Arts (Medieval Academy Reprints for Teaching), vol. 25, University of Toronto Press, pp. 227–270, ISBN 978-0-8020-6708-1
- Mainstone, Rowland J. (2001). Developments in Structural Form (2 ed.). Abingdon, England: Routledge. ISBN 978-0-7506-5451-7.
- Melaragno, Michele G. (1991). An Introduction to Shell Structures: the Art and Science of Vaulting (softcover ed.). New York, New York: Van Nostrand Reinhold. ISBN 978-1-4757-0225-5.
- Morgan, David (2016). Medieval Persia 1040–1797 (PDF) (second ed.). Abingdon, England: Routledge. ISBN 978-1-138-88629-2. Archived from the original (PDF) on 2023-12-09.
- Nickel, Lukas (2015), "Bricks in Ancient China and the Question of Early Cross-Asian Interaction", Arts Asiatiques, 70, École française d’Extrême-Orient: 49–62, doi:10.3406/arasi.2015.1883, JSTOR 26358183
- O'Kane, Bernard (1993). "From Tents to Pavilions: Royal Mobility and Persian Palace Design". Ars Orientalis. 23. The Smithsonian Institution: 249–268. JSTOR 4629452.
- O'Kane, Bernard (1995), Domes, Encyclopædia Iranica
- Özgan, Sibel Yaseman; Özkar, Mine (2019), "The Dividing of the Sphere in Domes of Medieval Anatolia", in Magnaghi-Delfino, Paola; Mele, Giampiero; Norando, Tullia (eds.), Faces of Geometry. From Agnesi to Mirzakhani, vol. 88, Springer Nature, pp. 165–176, doi:10.1007/978-3-030-29796-1_15, ISBN 978-3-030-29796-1
- Peterson, Andrew (1996). The Dictionary of Islamic Architecture. Abingdon, England: Routledge. ISBN 978-0-203-20387-3.
- Architectural Complex of Khodja Akhmed Yasawi, Republic of Kazakhstan National Commission for UNESCO, archived from the original on May 26, 2011
- Saquib, Mohammad; Ali, Asif (2023). "Persian Architecture: A Source of Inspiration for Mughal Imperial Mosques in North India". Journal of Islamic Architecture. 7 (4). Jawa Timur, Indonesia: International Center for Islamic Architecture: 744–749. doi:10.18860/jia.v7i4.21013.
- Scarce, J. (1989). "Tilework". In Ferrier, Ronald W. (ed.). The Arts of Persia (unabridged ed.). Yale University Press. pp. 271–294. ISBN 978-0-300-03987-0.
- Smith, Earl Baldwin (1978) [1st Pub. 1950]. The Dome: A Study in the History of Ideas. Princeton, NJ: Princeton University Press. ISBN 978-0-691-03875-9.
- Spiers, Richard Phené (1911). "Vault" . In Chisholm, Hugh (ed.). Encyclopædia Britannica. Vol. 27 (11th ed.). Cambridge University Press. pp. 956–961.
- Stephenson, Davis; Hammond, Victoria; Davi, Keith F. (2005). Visions of Heaven: the Dome in European Architecture (illustrated ed.). Princeton, NJ: Princeton Architectural Press. ISBN 978-1-56898-549-7.
- Stronach, David (1976). "On the Evolution of the Early Iranian Fire Temple". In Loicq, Jean; Duchesne-Guillemin, J. (eds.). Acta Iranica, Encyclopédie Permanente des Études Iraniennes, Deuxième Serié, Volume XI. Belgium: Centre International d'Études Indo-iraniennes. pp. 605–628. ISBN 978-90-6831-002-3.
- Swoboda, Karl M. (May 1961). "The Problem of the Iconography of Late Antique and Early Mediaeval Palaces". Journal of the Society of Architectural Historians. 20 (2). Berkeley, CA: University of California Press: 78–89. doi:10.2307/988105. JSTOR 988105.
- Tabbaa, Yasser (1985). "The Muqarnas Dome: Its Origin and Meaning". Muqarnas. 3. BRILL: 61–74. doi:10.2307/1523084. JSTOR 1523084.
- Tappin, Stuart (2003). "The Structural Development of Masonry Domes in India". In Huerta, S. (ed.). Proceedings of the First International Congress on Construction History, Madrid, 20th-24th January 2003 (PDF). Madrid: I. Juan de Herrera. pp. 1941–1952. ISBN 978-84-9728-070-9. Archived from the original (PDF) on 2013-10-04.
- Wahby, Ahmed; Montasser, Dina (2012), "The Ornamented Domes of Cairo: the Mamluk Mason's Challenge" (PDF), Masons at Work conference, vol. 30, University of Pennsylvania
- Wilber, Donald N. (1979). "The Timurid Court: Life in Gardens and Tents". Iran. 17. Taylor & Francis, Ltd.: 127–133. doi:10.2307/4299682. JSTOR 4299682.
