= South Asian domes =

Domed huts made from bamboo or timber appear to have been used on the Indian subcontinent from antiquity and contemporary rock-cut tombs may imitate them. There are examples of domed chambers in brick and stone temples built prior to Islamic rule over northern and central India.

The introduction of Muslim architecture included the use of domes constructed with stone, brick and mortar, and iron dowels and cramps. Centering was made from timber and bamboo. The use of iron cramps to join together adjacent stones was known in Ancient India, and was used at the base of domes for hoop reinforcement. The synthesis of styles created by this introduction of new forms to the Hindu tradition of trabeate construction created a distinctive architecture.

Domes in pre-Mughal India have a standard squat circular shape with a lotus design and bulbous finial at the top, derived from Hindu architecture. Because the Hindu architectural tradition did not include arches extensively, flat corbels were used to transition from the corners of the room to the dome, rather than squinches. In contrast to Persian and Ottoman domes, the domes of Indian tombs tend to be more bulbous.

== Early history ==
Most monumental architecture in South Asia, until the wide adoption of stone construction by the sixth or seventh century AD, was made of perishable materials that have not survived the climate, such as timber or brick. What did survive included stone mortuary monuments, rock-cut monastic complexes, stone-carved depictions of buildings, and references in texts.

Hemispherical rock-cut tombs appear to imitate in stone the early bamboo or timber roofed domed huts with central poles known from the pre-Buddhist period. Examples include Sudama cave (3rd century BC) in Bihar, a similar domed chamber at Cannanora in Malabar, and a cave at Guntpalle (1st century BC). A rock-cut hemispherical chamber at Manappuram in Kerala retained a thin central pillar with no structural function. The hemispherical shape of Buddhist stupas, likely refined forms of burial mounds, may also reflect earlier wooden dome roof construction, such as depicted at Ghantasala.

Bas-relief sculptures from Sāñcī (1st century BC), Bhārhut (2nd century BC), and Amarāvatī (2nd century BC), depict domed huts, shrines, and pavilions. Relief sculptures in Gandhāra depict dome architectural elements in Indian forms.

The Buddhist monastery of Takht-i-Bahi (2nd/4th century) included domed cells that may have represented thatch-domed huts, and may have been a response to building conventions from central Asia. Square kūṭāgāra shrines included a domical roof.

The brick temple of Bhītārgāñv, from around the middle of the fifth century under the Gupta Empire, has two vaulted dome chambers. Some caves near the Buddhas of Bamiyan include domes on squinches, evidence of influence from the west transmitted along the caravan route to Bamyan.

The term kaṇṇikā in Pali texts has been proposed to mean a roof-plate central attachment point for curved dome or semi-dome ribs in early Indian timber construction. Examples of this wooden rib and roof-plate arrangement translated into stone can be seen in the half-domes of Ajanta Cave XIX and Aurangabad Cave IV.

Sixth and early seventh century Hindu temples at Kafir Kot have interior stone domes with triangular pendentives, as does an eighth century brick temple at Kallar.

In the tenth century, temples with domed chambers include examples built by the Hindu Shahis at Amb, Bilot, and Nandana.

== Dehli Sultanate ==
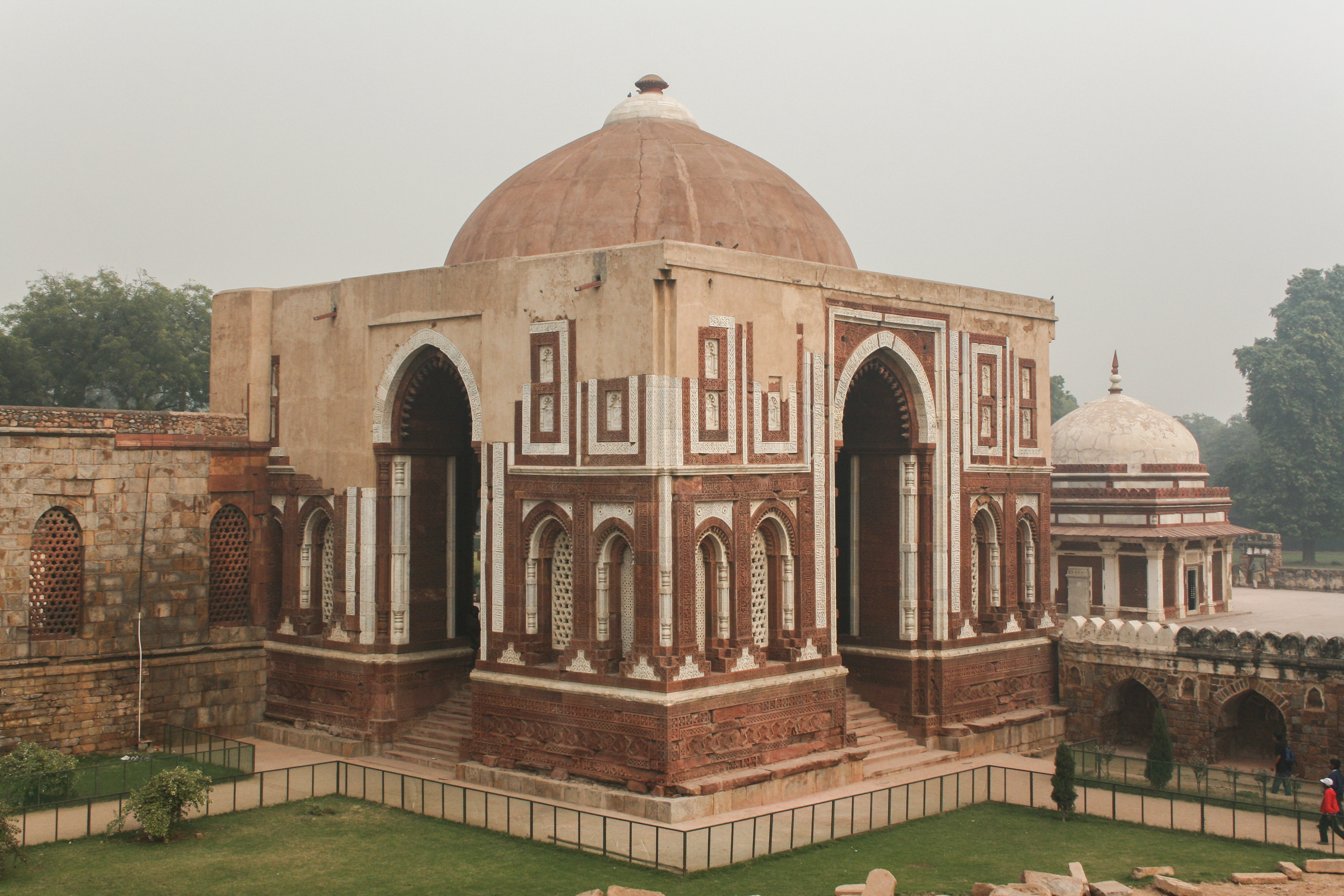
The Alai Dawarza in Delhi.

The first domed mausolea in Multan are those of Shaikh Baha al-Din Zakariya (d. 1262), Shahdana Shahid (d. 1270), and Shams Sabazwari (d. 1276), with hemispherical domes on octagonal drums over a square plan.

The half-domes of the late 13th century tomb of Balban and the small dome of the tomb of Khan Shahid were made of roughly cut material and would have needed covering surface finishes. The Alai Dawarza, a gate in the Qutb complex built in 1311, has the first dome in India made of finely dressed stone cut into voussoir blocks. Arches transition a square chamber to an octagon, which transitions to a sixteen-sided polygon through the use of corbelled brackets. The cut stone dome over the tomb of Ghiyath al-Din Tughluq (d. 1325) uses alternating rings of shallow and deep stones to produce a better bond with the core material. The use of finely cut stone voussoirs for these domes suggest the migration of masons from the former Seljuk Empire.

The Tomb of Shah Rukn-e-Alam (d. 1335) is notable for the building's octagonal plan, rather than the traditional square plan, and the dome is 15 metres (50 ft) wide with a finial extending to 35 metres (115 ft) above the ground.

Domes from the late 14th century use roughly shaped stones covered in render, due to the dispersal of skilled masons following the movement of the capital from Delhi to Daulatabad and back again. Examples include the Khirki Masjid (c. 1375) and the tomb of Firoz Shah (d. 1388). The domed tomb of Khan-i-Jahan Tilangani (1368) is generally referred to as "the first octagonal tomb in Delhi with the domed central chamber surrounded by an ambulatory verandah with three arched openings on each facet", although it is predated by the tomb of Zafar Khan.

The use of small domed pavilions later called chatrīs first appear around the drum of a larger dome under the Sayyid or Lodī dynasties (1414-1526).

Under the Lodi dynasty there was a large proliferation of tomb building, with octagonal plans reserved for royalty and square plans used for others of high rank, and the first double dome was introduced to India in this period. There are multiple candidates. The tomb of Sikander Lodi was built from 1517 to 1518 and is cited, but is predated by the brick tomb of Zain-ul-Abidin's mother, built around 1465 in Zaina Kadal, Srinagar. The Sabz Burj in Delhi may be earlier still, but is dated to 1530-40 by written sources. Although the tomb of Sikander Loki clearly has a double dome, with a distinct space between inner and outer shells, the earlier tomb of Shihab-ud-din Taj Khan (1501) has "an attempt in this direction". Although double domes had long been used in Persia, Iraq, and western Asia, Indian domes prior to this time domes had a single shell of stonework. Afterward, most of the large domes were built with two shells in order to preserve good proportions in both the interior and exterior. Mosques with three domes and one aisle were developed by the end of the Lodi period and were further developed under the Mughals.

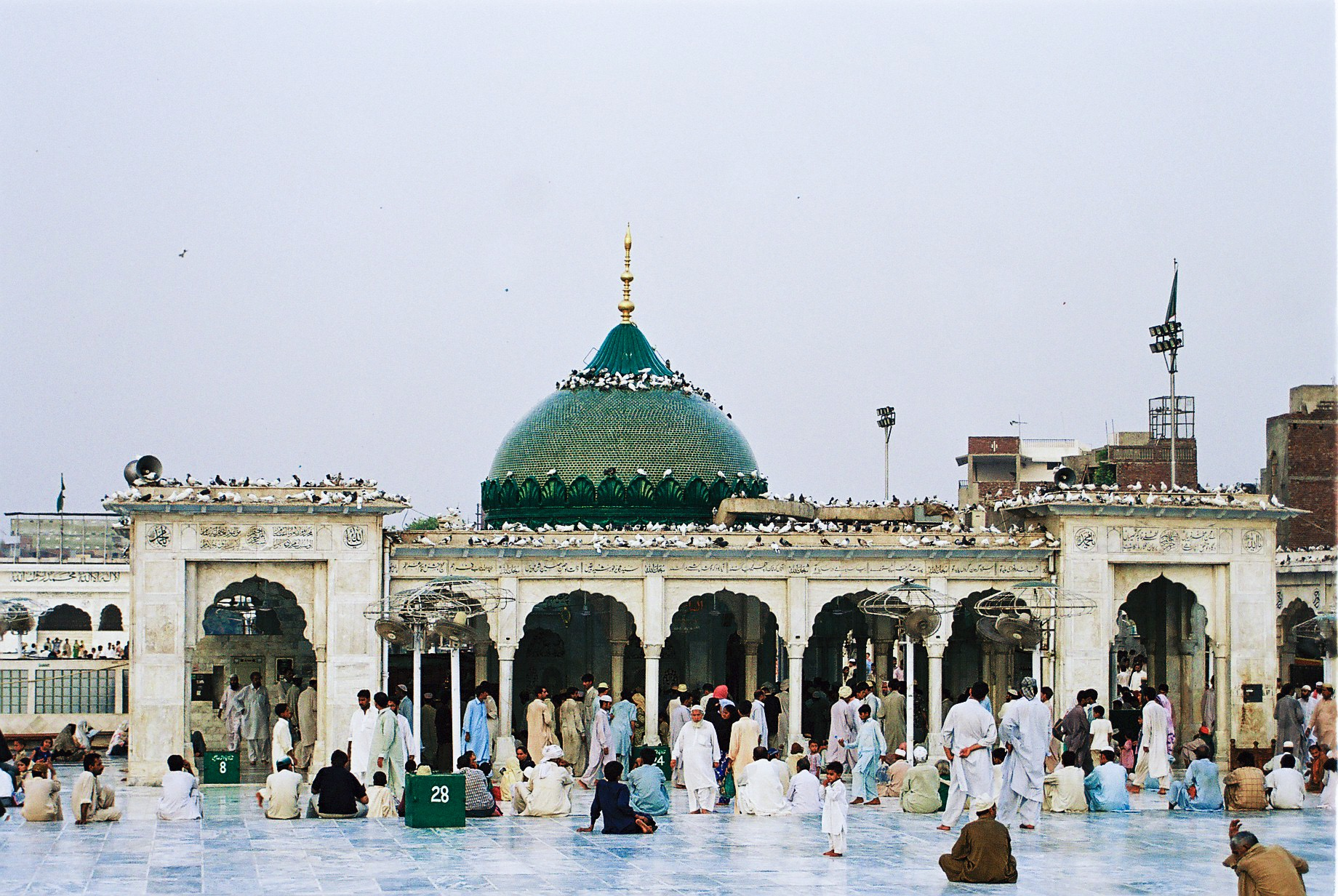
The Data durbar in Lahore, Pakistan, is the largest Sufi complex in South Asia.

The dome of Data Durbar used corner squinches typical of the pre-Mughal Muslim architecture of South Asia.

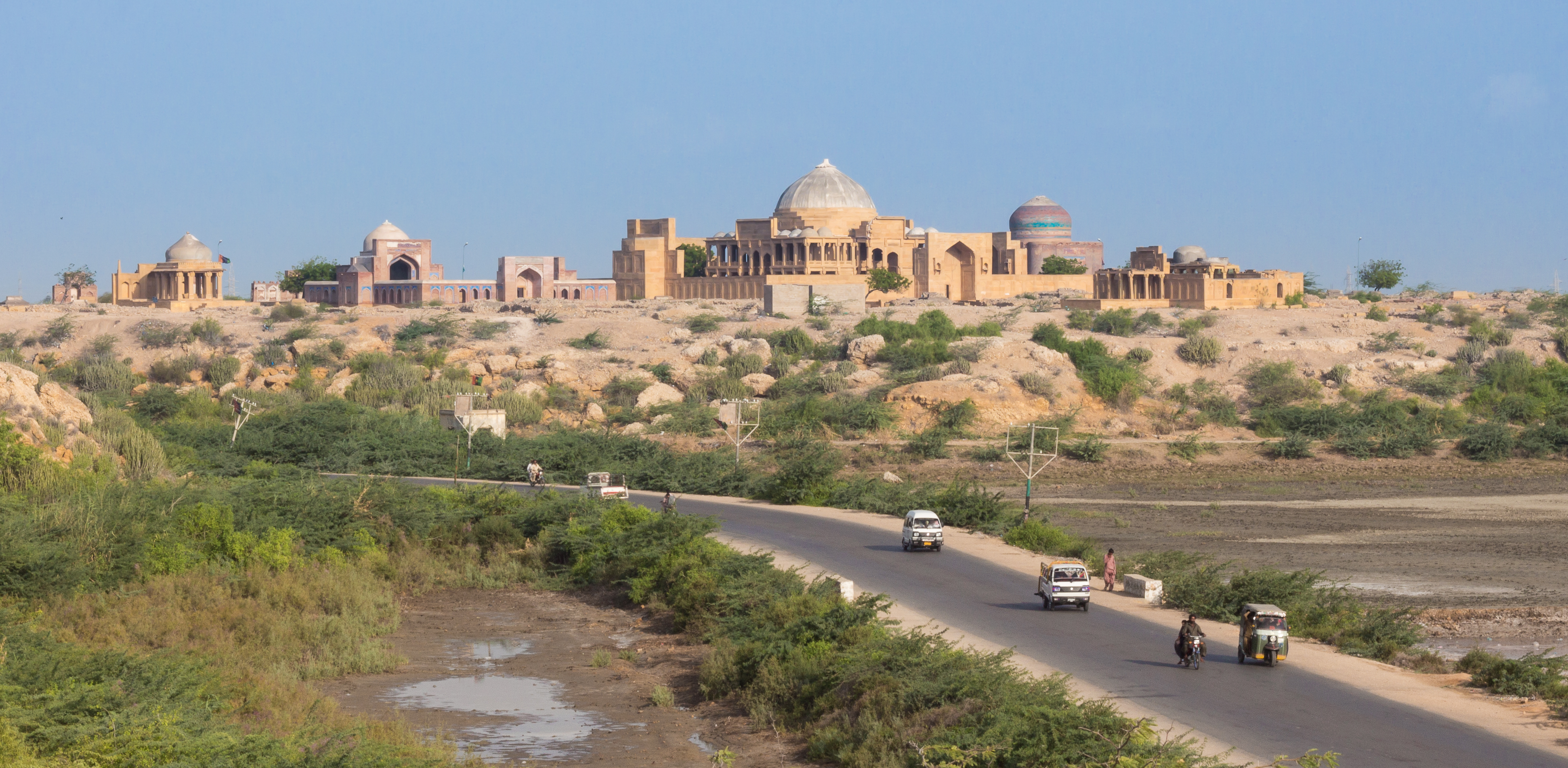
The UNESCO World Heritage Site of Makli Hills in Thatta, Sindh Province, Pakistan.

Many of the medieval mausolea in the Makli Necropolis, near Thatta, Sindh province, are decorated with Islamic and Hindu motifs. The later mausolea resemble the domed constructions of Central Asia.

== Mughal Empire ==
Bulbous domed trellis tents are known to have been used in the Mughal court from illustrations and descriptions, likely originating with Babur and his ancestral nomadic tradition of the yurt trellis tent that merged with the northern Indian court tent tradition. The use of a "hemispherical roof wheel" for the bulbous trellis tents was normal under Akbar.

The first major Mughal building was the domed tomb of Humayun, built between 1562 and 1571 by a Persian architect. The central dome likely has a core of brick, as can be seen in the later stripped tomb of Khan-i-Khanan. The central dome is faced with marble blocks in attached to the core by alternating wide and narrow layers and there is evidence of the use of iron cramps to secure them. Iron cramps may also help form a tension ring at the base of the dome. The central double dome covers an octagonal central chamber about 15 meters wide and is accompanied by small domed chattri made of brick and faced with stone. Smaller domes were widely made with rectangular bricks beginning in the 16th century, the necessary curvature being created by tapering the mortar joints. Chatris, the domed kiosks on pillars characteristic of Mughal roofs, were adopted from their Hindu use as cenotaphs.

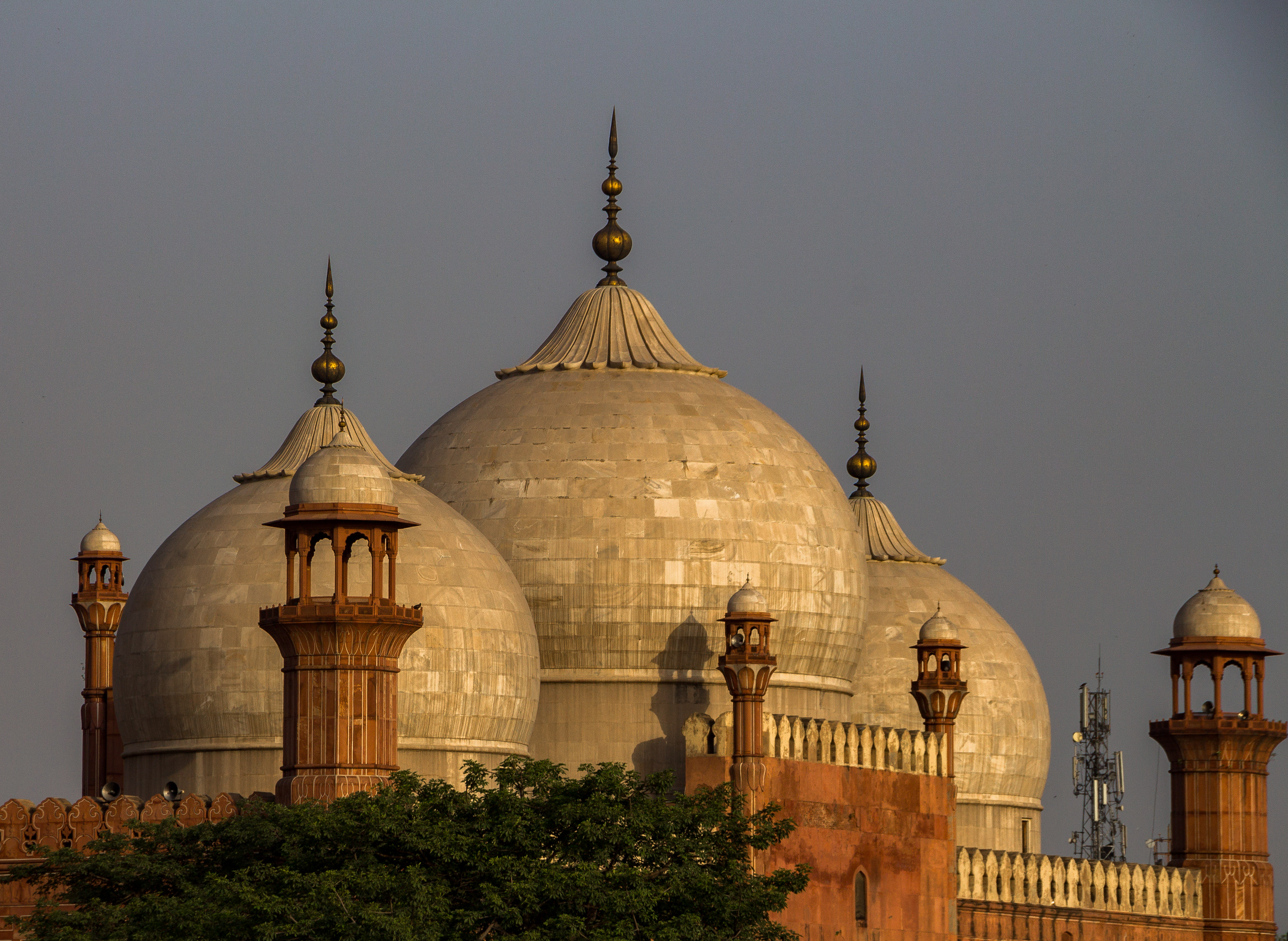
The bulbous domes of the Badshahi mosque in Lahore, Pakistan.

Mughal mosques, such as Jama Mosque, Fatehpur Sikri, Jama Masjid, Delhi, and Madrasa Ghaziuddin Khan, had a prayer hall covered with three domes along the qibla wall.

Domes in the buildings of Shah Jahan are used "almost exclusively for mosques and tombs" in the raised bulbous onion style of Mughal architecture.

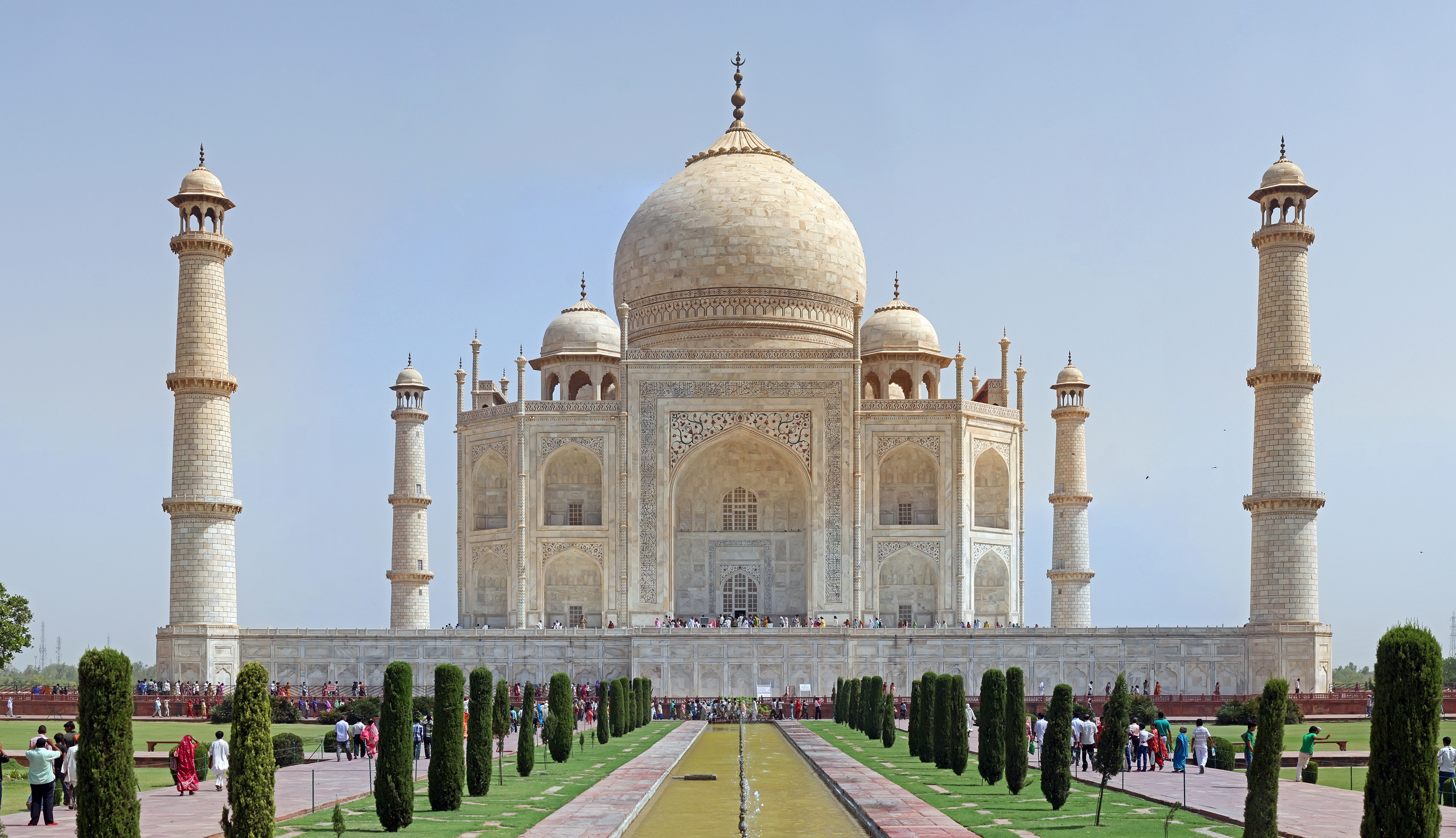
The Taj Mahal in Agra, India.

The Taj Mahal in Agra, also a brick structure clad primarily in marble, was begun in 1632 and mostly completed in 1636; the rest of the extensive complex would not be finished before 1643. The tomb was built for Mumtaz Mahal, a wife of emperor Shah Jahan, after her death in 1631. The central double dome covers a diameter of 22 meters. The inner dome is three meters thick and over 30 meters below the outer dome. The outer dome rests upon drum walls five metes thick. The widest part of the outer dome is 33.62 meters in diameter, at 9.24 meters above the drum. The bronze finial at the top of the dome is a replica that dates to the early 19th century. The drum acts as an optical correction for the view from ground level. The height of the dome, half the total height, is consistent with early Timurid architecture, but against the trend of Mughal architecture up to that point. The fusion of Persian and Indian architecture can be seen in the dome's shape: the bulbous shape derives from Persian Timurid domes, and the finial with lotus leaf base is derived from Hindu temples. The inner dome has a decorative triangulated pattern modeled after plaster mold work, but here carved in marble. The entire complex is highly symmetrical. On the western side of the tomb is a red sandstone mosque with three bulbous domes faced with marble, and on the eastern side is mirror-image assembly hall that likewise has three marble domes. At the center of the tomb hall lies the cenotaph of Mumtaz Mahal, with her husband's off-center to the west. The actual sarcophagi lie directly below, in the crypt, but in the same arrangement.

The Badshahi Mosque, one of the jewels of Mughal architecture, and South Asia's second-largest mosque, was built by Aurengzeb in 1673 much larger than the Shah Jahan's Delhi mosque about two decades earlier.

The last major Islamic tomb built in India was the tomb of Safdar Jang (1753–54). It is a brick structure clad in sandstone and marble stripped from the earlier tomb of Khan-i-Khanan (d. 1627). Shallow brick domes cover the perimeter chambers of the building, and the central dome is reportedly triple-shelled, with two relatively flat inner brick domes and an outer bulbous marble dome, although it may actually be that the marble and second brick domes are joined everywhere but under the lotus leaf finial at the top.

== Sultanate of Bijapur ==
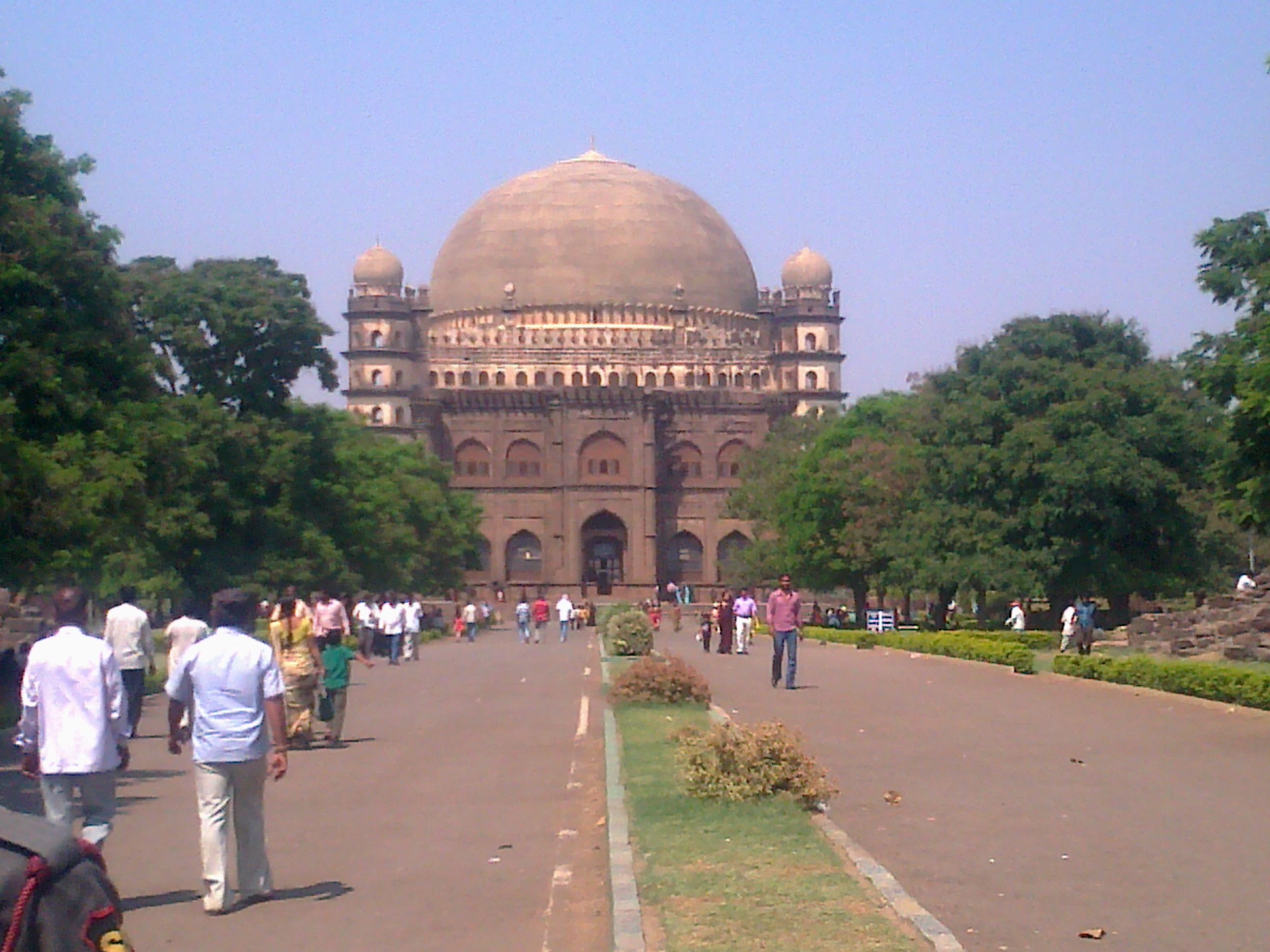
The Gol Gumbaz in Bijapur, India.

The tomb of Mohammed Adil Shah (d. 1656) in Bijapur is one of the largest masonry domes in the world. Called the Gol Gumbaz, or Round Dome, it has an internal diameter of 41.15 meters and a height of 54.25 meters. The dome was built with layers of brick between thick layers of mortar and rendered on both faces, so that the dome acts as a concrete shell reinforced with bricks. It is 2.6 meters thick at the base. The dome was the most technically advanced to be built in the Deccan, and exemplifies the flowering of art and architecture that occurred during the period of the Adil Shahi Sultanate's greatest extent. Radial cracks were repaired in 1936-7 by the application of reinforcement to the outside of the dome, which was then covered by sprayed concrete. Both the Gol Gumbaz dome and the smaller dome of the Jama Masjid, a 17-metre (57 ft) wide dome also at Bijapur, are above distinctive transition zones consisting of eight intersecting arches that narrow the openings to be covered.

== Sikh Confederacy and Sikh Empire ==
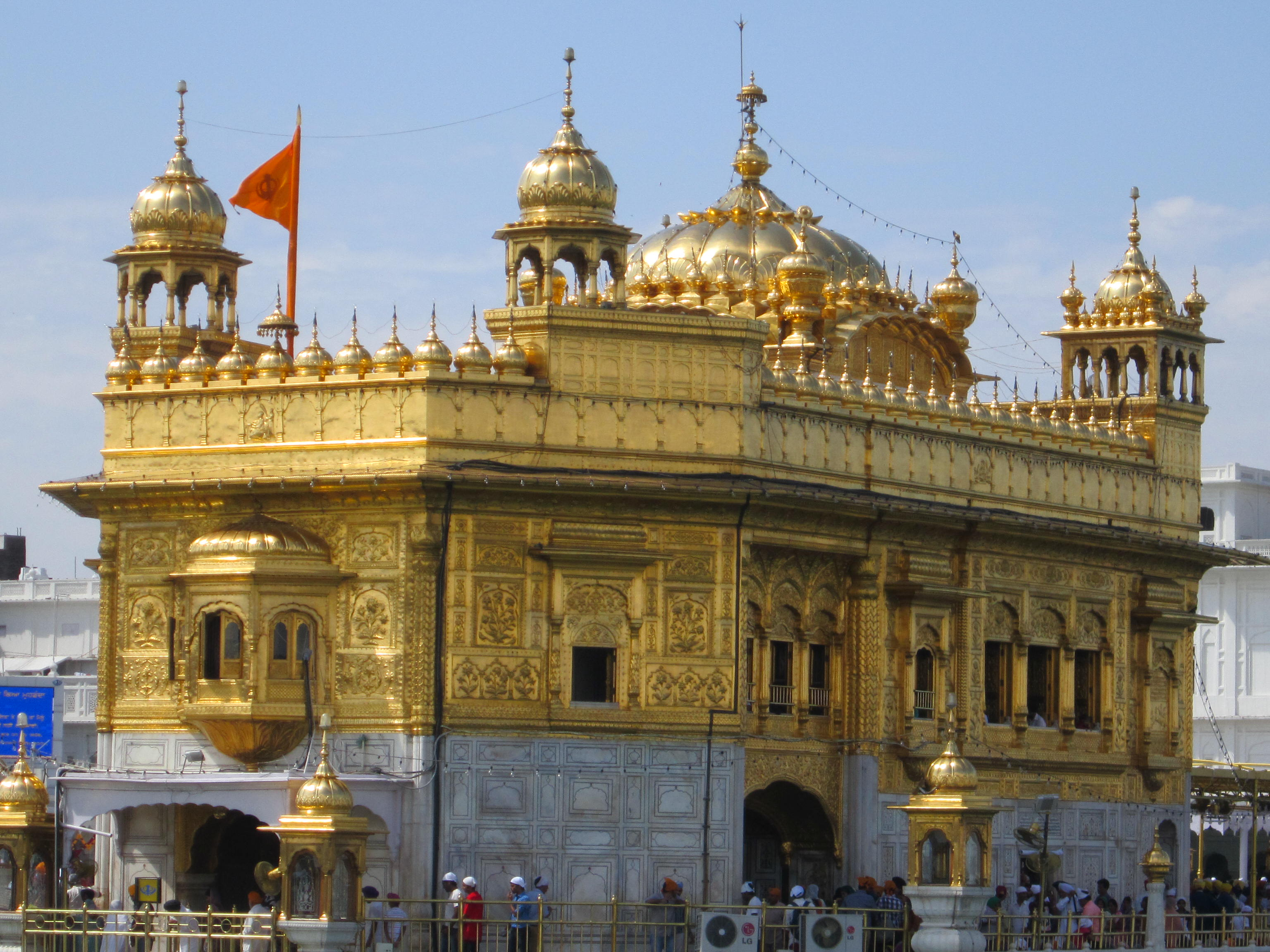
The Golden Temple in Amritsar

Domes appear frequently in Sikh architecture, which was greatly influenced by Mughal architecture. Most of Historical Sikh buildings were built towards the end of 18th century. Domes in Sikh architecture are mostly ribbed with lotus design at the top and floral motifs at the bottom. These domes start with wide base and reach maximum circumference when they are less than halfway up.

== British Raj ==
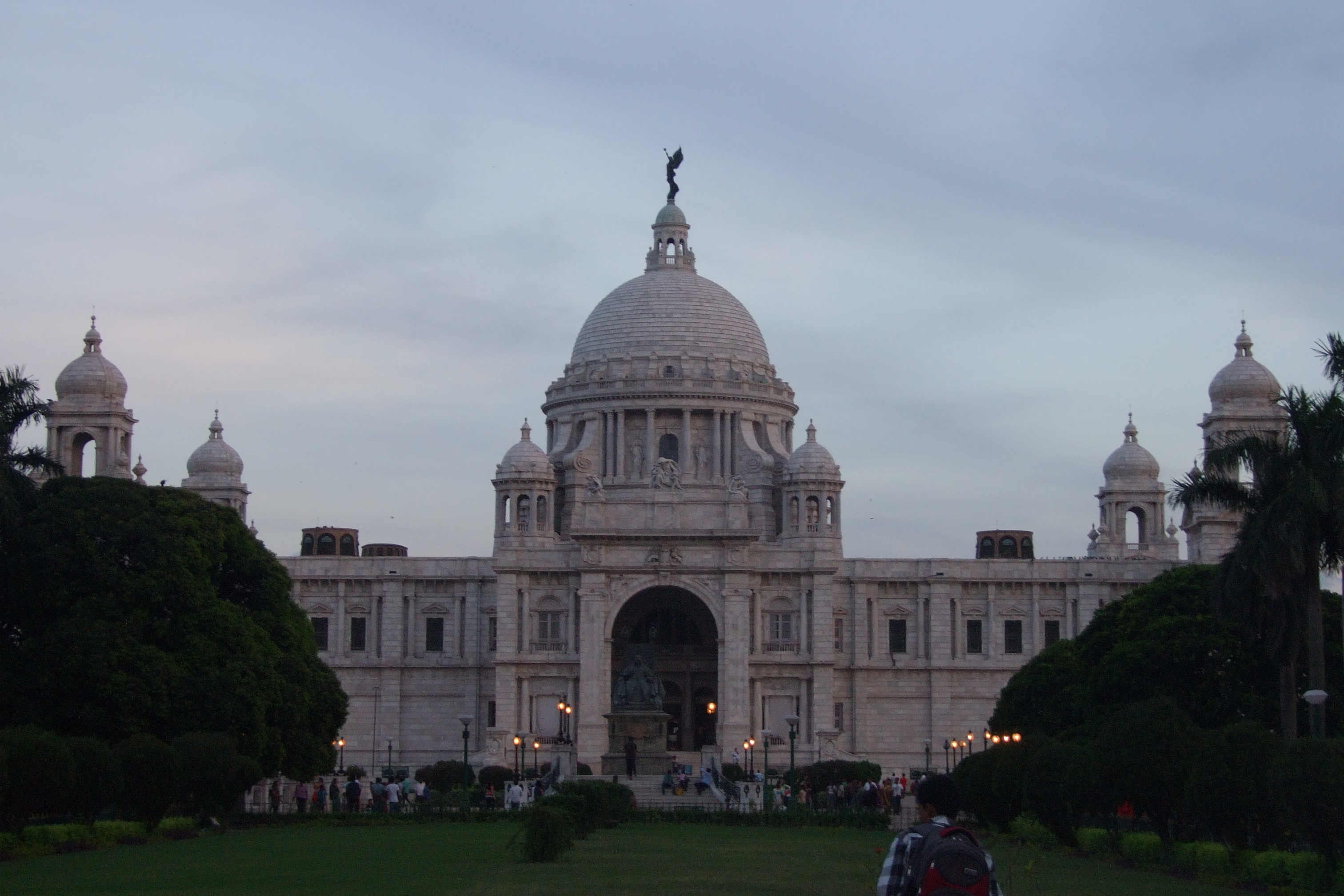
The Victoria Memorial in Kolkata, West Bengal

After the fall of the Mughal Empire, a new form of revivalist architecture developed under the British, known as Indo-Saracenic architecture. It draws heavily from Gothic, Rajput, and Mughal architectural forms, and extensively used domes.

== Bibliography ==
- Ahuja, Dilip R.; Rajani, M. B. (25 March 2016). "On the symmetry of the central dome of the Taj Mahal". Current Science. 110 (6). Current Science Association: 996–999. doi:10.18520/cs/v110/i6/996-999 (inactive 1 July 2025). JSTOR 24907866.
- Andrews, Peter Alford (1987). "The Generous Heart or the Mass of Clouds: The Court Tents of Shah Jahan". Muqarnas. 4. Brill: 149–165. JSTOR 24907866.
- Asher, Catherine (1992), Architecture of Mughal India, Cambridge University Press, ISBN 978-0-521-26728-1
- Avari, Burjor (2013), Islamic Civilization in South Asia: A History of Muslim Power and Presence in the Indian Subcontinent, Routledge, ISBN 978-0-415-58061-8
- Brown, Percy (2013). Indian Architecture (The Islamic Period). Read Books Ltd. ISBN 978-1-447-49482-9.
- Coomaraswamy, Ananda K. (1930). "Pali kaṇṇikā = Circular Roof-Plate". Journal of the American Oriental Society. 50. American Oriental Society: 238–243. doi:10.2307/593077. JSTOR 593077.
- Dandekar, Deepra; Tschacher, Torsten (2016), Islam, Sufism and Everyday Politics of Belonging in South Asia, Taylor & Francis, ISBN 978-1-317-43596-9
- Deva, Krishna (1988). "Mauryas Śuṅgas, Kāṇvas, Kuṣāṇas, Kṣatrapas". In Meister, Michael W.; Dhaky, M.A.; Deva, Krishna (eds.). Encyclopaedia of Indian Temple Architecture: Volume II, Part 1. Delhi: Oxford University Press. ISBN 0-19-562313-4.
- Deva, Krishna (1988). "Guptas and their Feudatories". In Meister, Michael W.; Dhaky, M.A.; Deva, Krishna (eds.). Encyclopaedia of Indian Temple Architecture: Volume II, Part 1. Delhi: Oxford University Press. ISBN 0-19-562313-4.
- Harle, J.C. (1994). The Art and Architecture of the Indian Subcontinent (Second ed.). New Haven and London: Yale University Press. ISBN 978-0-300-06217-5. LCCN 95125417.
- Hasan, Shaikh Khurshid (June 2001). "Pakistan: Its Seraiki Style of Tomb Architecture". East and West. 51 (1/2). Istituto Italiano per l'Africa e l'Oriente (IsIAO): 167–178. JSTOR 29757500.
- Heitzman, James (2008), The City in South Asia, Routledge, ISBN 978-1-134-28963-9
- Kim, Young Jae (1960). "Reconsidering the Symbolic Meaning of the Stupa". Bulletin de l'École Française d'Extrême-Orient. 50 (1): 159–168.
- Koch, Ebba (2005). "The Taj Mahal: Architecture, Symbolism, and Urban Significance" (PDF). Muqarnas. 22: 128–149. doi:10.1163/22118993-90000087.
- Meister, Michael W. (Spring 2003). "Crossing Lines: Architecture in Early Islamic South Asia". RES: Anthropology and Aesthetics. 43 (43). The University of Chicago Press on behalf of the Peabody Museum of Archaeology and Ethnology: 117–130. doi:10.1086/RESv43n1ms20167593. JSTOR 20167593.
- Michell, George; Zebrowski, Mark (1987). Architecture and Art of the Deccan Sultanates. The New Cambridge History of India. Cambridge University Press. ISBN 978-0-521-56321-5.
- Nuttgens, Patrick (1997). The Story of Architecture. Hong Kong: Phaidon Press Limited. ISBN 0-7148-3616-8.
- Parodi, Laura E. (2000). "'The Distilled Essence of the Timurid Spirit': Some Observations on the Taj Mahal". East and West. 50 (1). Istituto Italiano per l'Africa e l'Oriente (IsIAO): 535–542. JSTOR 29757466.
- Peterson, Andrew (1996). The Dictionary of Islamic Architecture. Routledge. ISBN 0-203-20387-9.
- Randhir, G. S. (1990). Sikh Shrines in India. Publications Division Ministry of Information & Broadcasting. ISBN 978-8-123-02260-4.
- Saquib, Mohammad; Ali, Asif (2023). "Persian Architecture: A Source of Inspiration for Mughal Imperial Mosques in North India". Journal of Islamic Architecture. 7 (4). Jawa Timur, Indonesia: International Center for Islamic Architecture: 744–749. doi:10.18860/jia.v7i4.21013.
- Suvorova, Anna (2004), Muslim Saints of South Asia: The Eleventh to Fifteenth Centuries, Routledge, ISBN 978-1-134-37006-1
- Tappin, Stuart (2003). "The Structural Development of Masonry Domes in India". In Huerta, S. (ed.). Proceedings of the First International Congress on Construction History, Madrid, 20th-24th January 2003 (PDF). Madrid: I. Juan de Herrera. pp. 1941–1952. ISBN 84-9728-070-9. Archived from the original (PDF) on 4 October 2013.
- Tarlow, Sarah; Stutz, Liv Nilsson, eds. (6 June 2013), The Oxford Handbook of the Archaeology of Death and Burial, Oxford University Press, ISBN 978-0-19-165039-0
- Tillotson, Giles (2012). Taj Mahal. Harvard University Press. ISBN 978-0-674-06365-5.
- Spiers, Richard Phené (1911). "Vault" . In Chisholm, Hugh (ed.). Encyclopædia Britannica. Vol. 27 (11th ed.). Cambridge University Press. pp. 956–961.
- Wagoner, Phillip B. (March 1999). "Ananda K. Coomaraswamy and the Practice of Architectural History". Journal of the Society of Architectural Historians. 58 (1). University of California Press: 62–67. doi:10.2307/991437. JSTOR 991437.
