= Kenimadala =

Architectural term used in mediaeval Sinhalese timber structures

Kenimadala is an architectural term utilised in medieval Sinhalese timber structures. It is used to describe the circular roof plate or structural member where the rafters, śalākā, connect at the apex of a domed or conical roof. The roof of a dageba or cetiya, above the stupa were generally domical in shape and were constructed of timber rafters which were held together on the top by means of a circular boss or kenimadala.

It is also known as Kannikā in Pali, which means 'sun-gate', as it represents the doorway where the worthy or arhat leave the world.

== See also ==
- Madol Kurupawa
- Pekada
