= Embekka Devalaya =

Buddhist temple in Kandy District, Sri Lanka

Embekke Devalaya
- ඇම්බැක්කේ දේවාලය
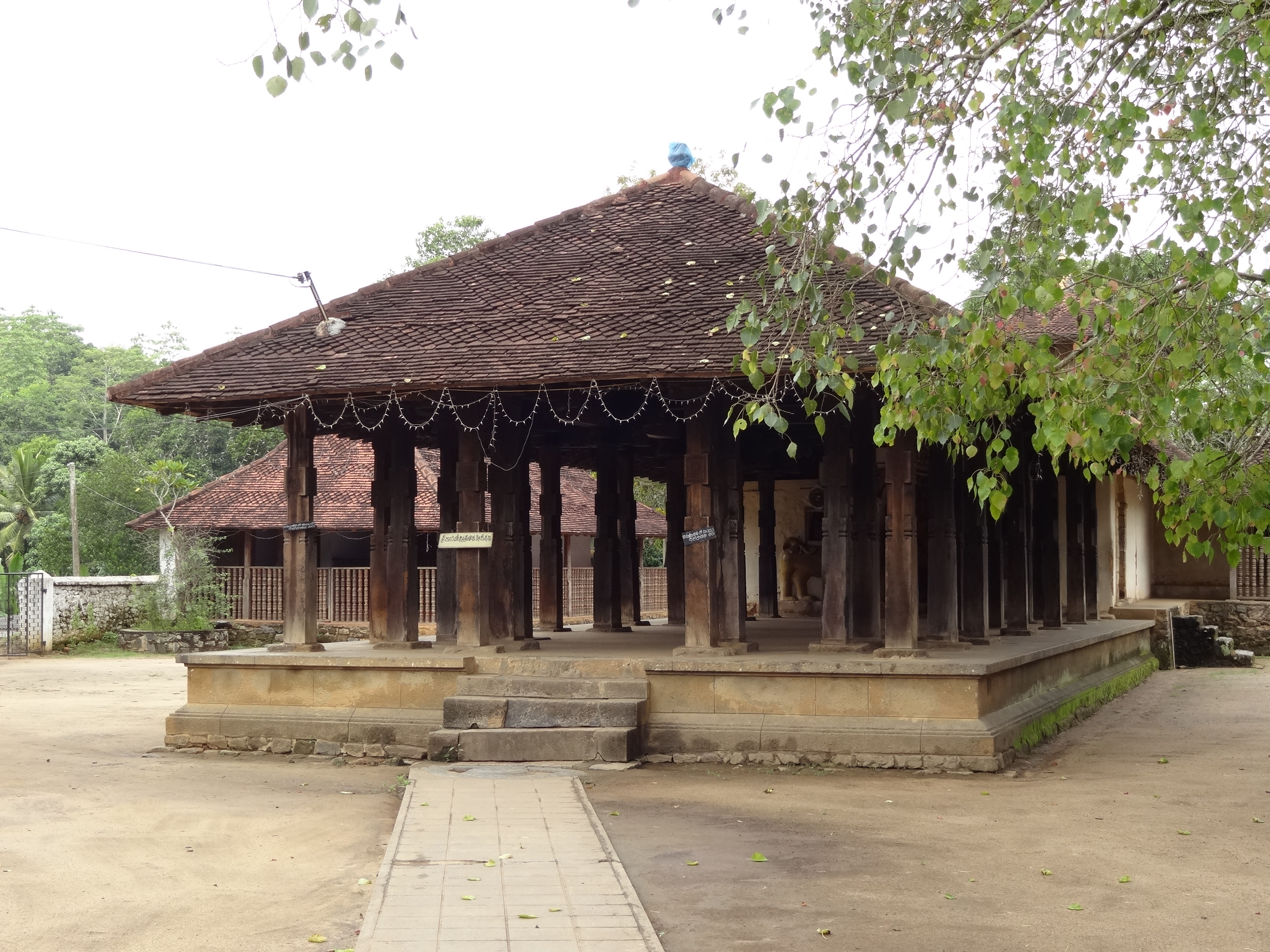

Religion
- Affiliation: Sinhalese Regional Deity Concept
- District: Kandy
- Province: Central Province
- Deity: Kataragama Deviyo as Skandha Kumara, Devatha Bandara

Location
- Location: Udunuwara, Sri Lanka
- Interactive map of Embekke Devalaya
- Coordinates: 07°13′04.5″N 80°34′03.8″E

Architecture
- Type: Devalaya
- Founder: King Vikramabahu III
- Archaeological Protected Monument of Sri Lanka
- Designated: 23 January 2009

Embekka Devalaya (Embekka Temple) was built by the King Vikramabahu III of Gampola Era (AD 1357–1374) in Sri Lanka. The Devalaya is dedicated to God Kataragama. A local deity called Devatha Bandara is also worshiped at this site. The shrine consists of three sections, the "Sanctum of Garagha", the "Digge" or "Dancing Hall" and the "Hevisi Mandapaya" or the "Drummers' Hall". The Drummers' Hall has drawn the attention of visitors to the site, due to the splendid wood carvings of its ornate pillars and its high pitched roof.

== Location ==
Embekke Devalaya is situated in Medapalata Korale of Udunuwara in Kandy District. This is a sheltered place used to rest during long pilgrimage or long journeys in ancient days of Sri Lanka. This Ambalama is said to be built during AD 1341–1357 by the King Bhuwanekabhahu IV.

== Carvings and woodwork ==
It is said that some of the wood work utilized for the "Drummers' Hall" came from an abandoned "Royal Audience Hall" at Gampola. There is every possibility the hall has seen repairs during the reigns of the Sinhalese Kings of Kandy. The carvings, which adorn the wooden pillars of the drummers' hall, as well as the "Vahalkada" (the entrance porch of the Devala, which is said to be older) are some of the best examples of Sinhalese art. The base of the wooden pillars are octagonal shaped while their pillar top or "Pekada", has four leaves stacked in a square. The most noted and famous carvings out of them are the entwined swans, double headed eagles, entwined rope designs, breast-feeding image, a soldier fighting on horseback, female dancers, wrestlers, women emanating from a vein, bird-human hybrid, elephant-bull hybrid and elephant-lion hybrid.

The roof has significant features. The rafters all slant from above towards the incoming visitor are fixed together and kept in position by a "Madol Kurupawa", a kind of a giant catch pin the like of which we do not find elsewhere. When we consider the carvings of the entire temple there are about 125 series of decorations, 256 liyawela type designs, and 64 lotus designs, 30 decorative patterns and roof designs, ending up in 514 unique designs.

Nevertheless, all these carved pillars are belonging to 18th century.

== Gallery ==
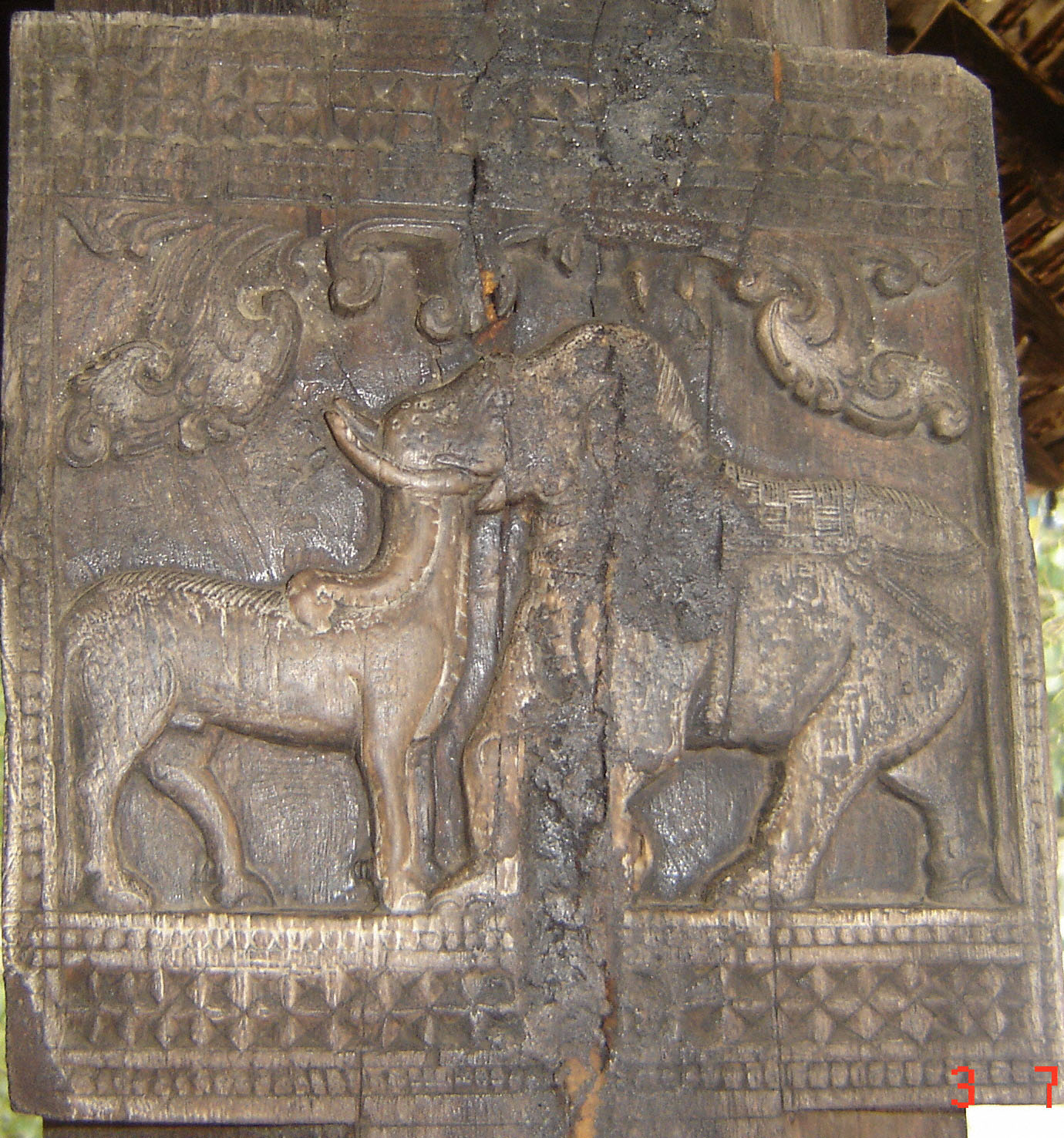
Bull & Elephant (Vrishabha Kunjaraya)

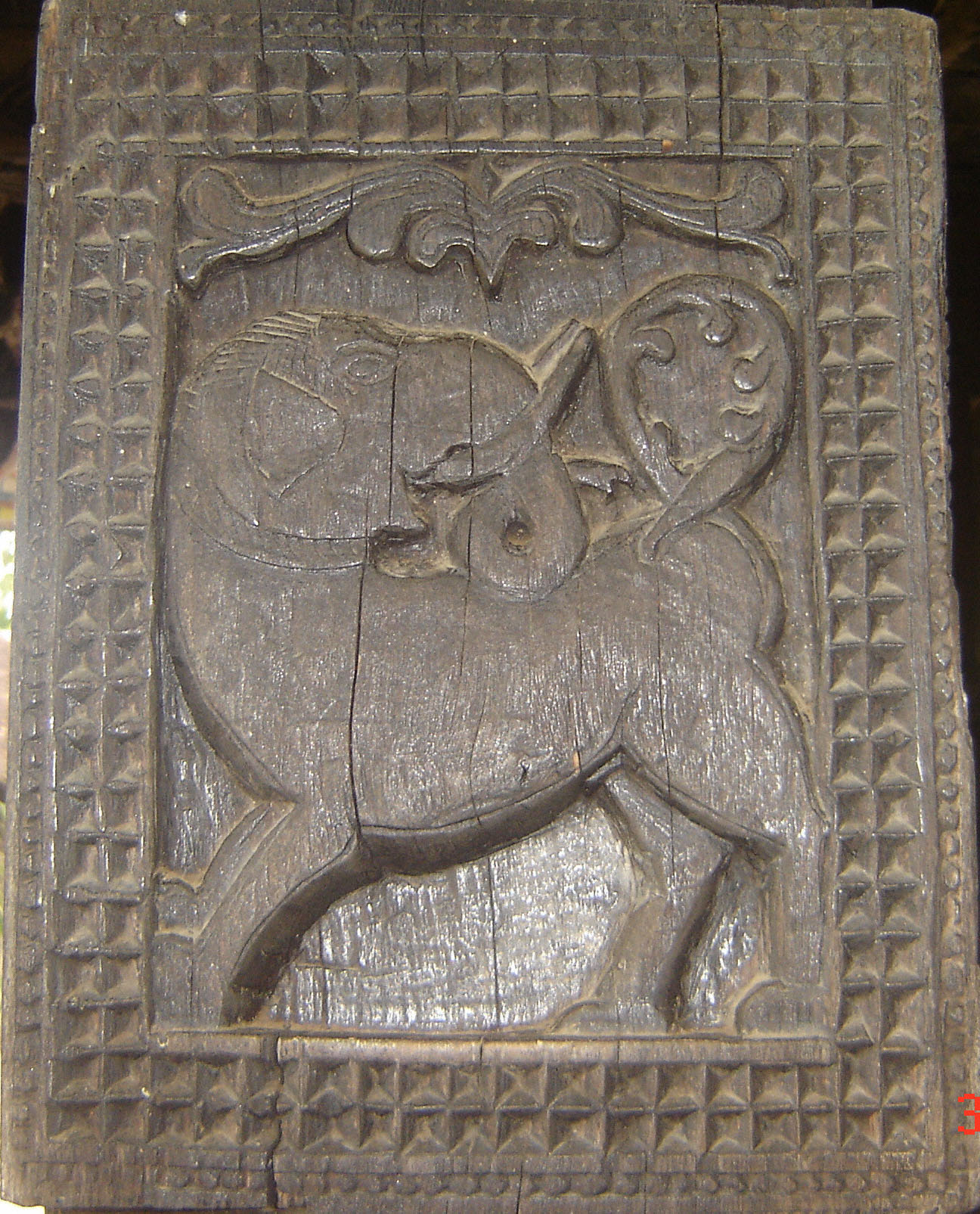
"GajaSinha", the Elephant Lion.

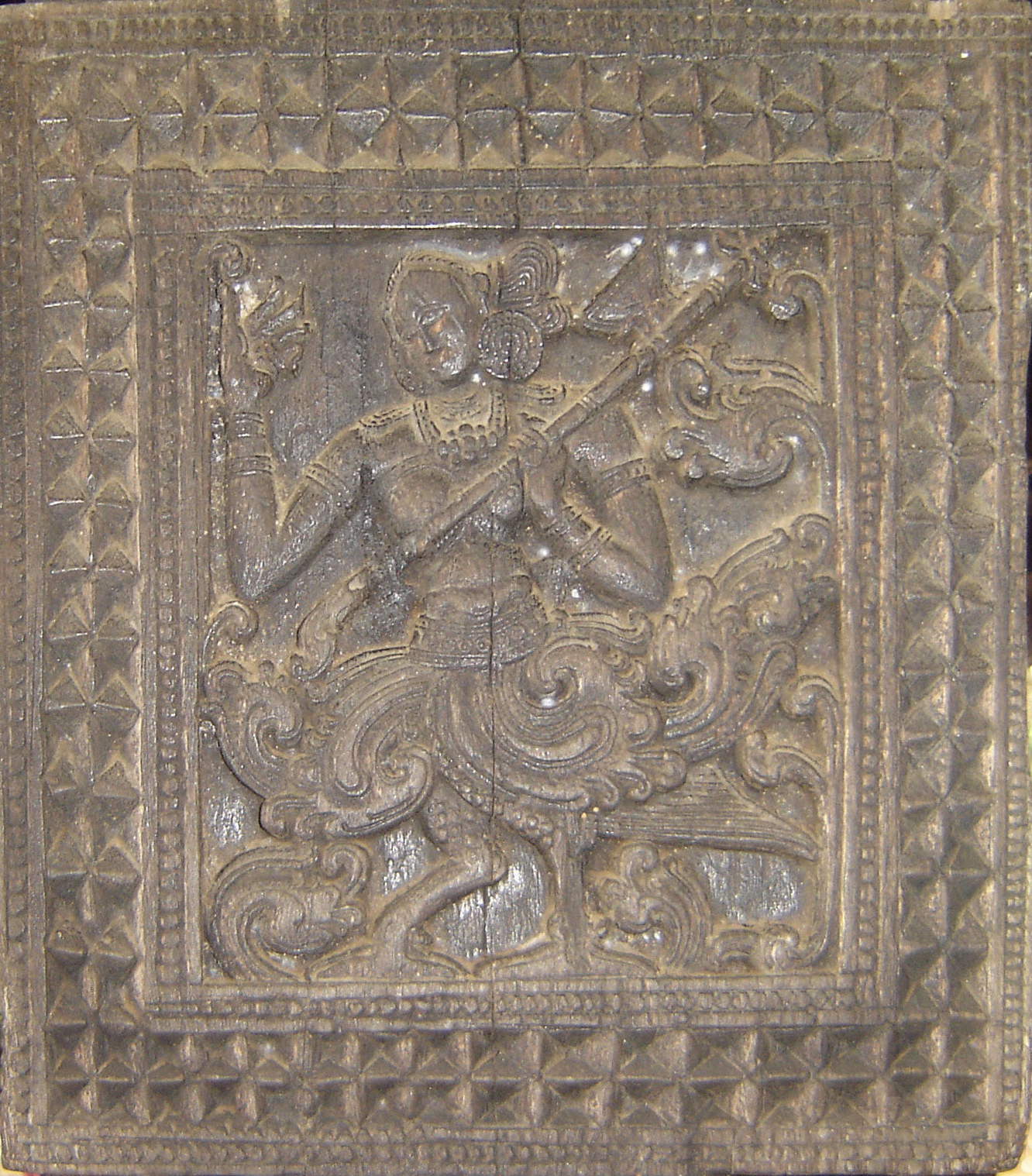
Kinnari with alapini vina

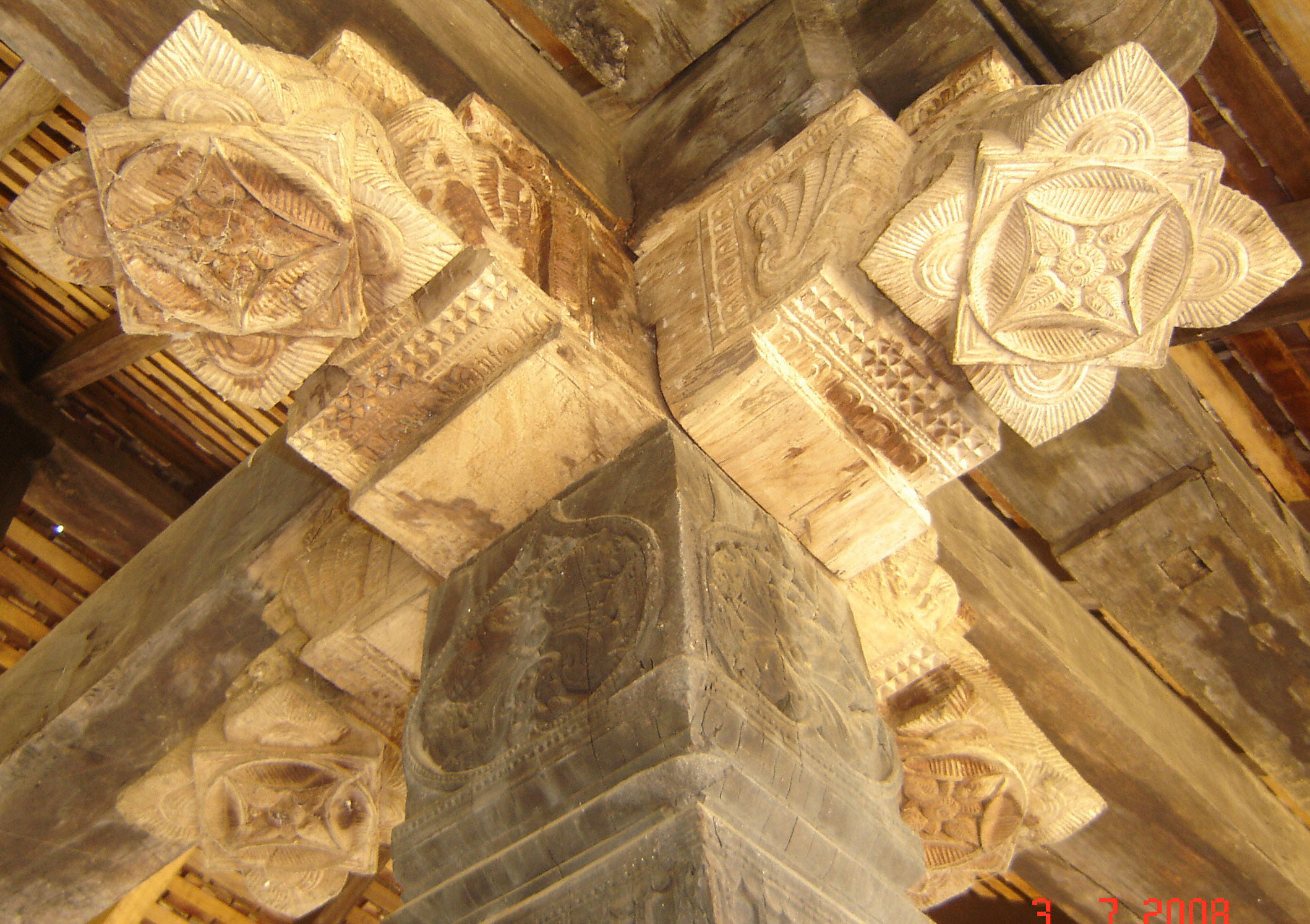
A pekada (pillar top) with similar carving across the "Drummers' Hall".

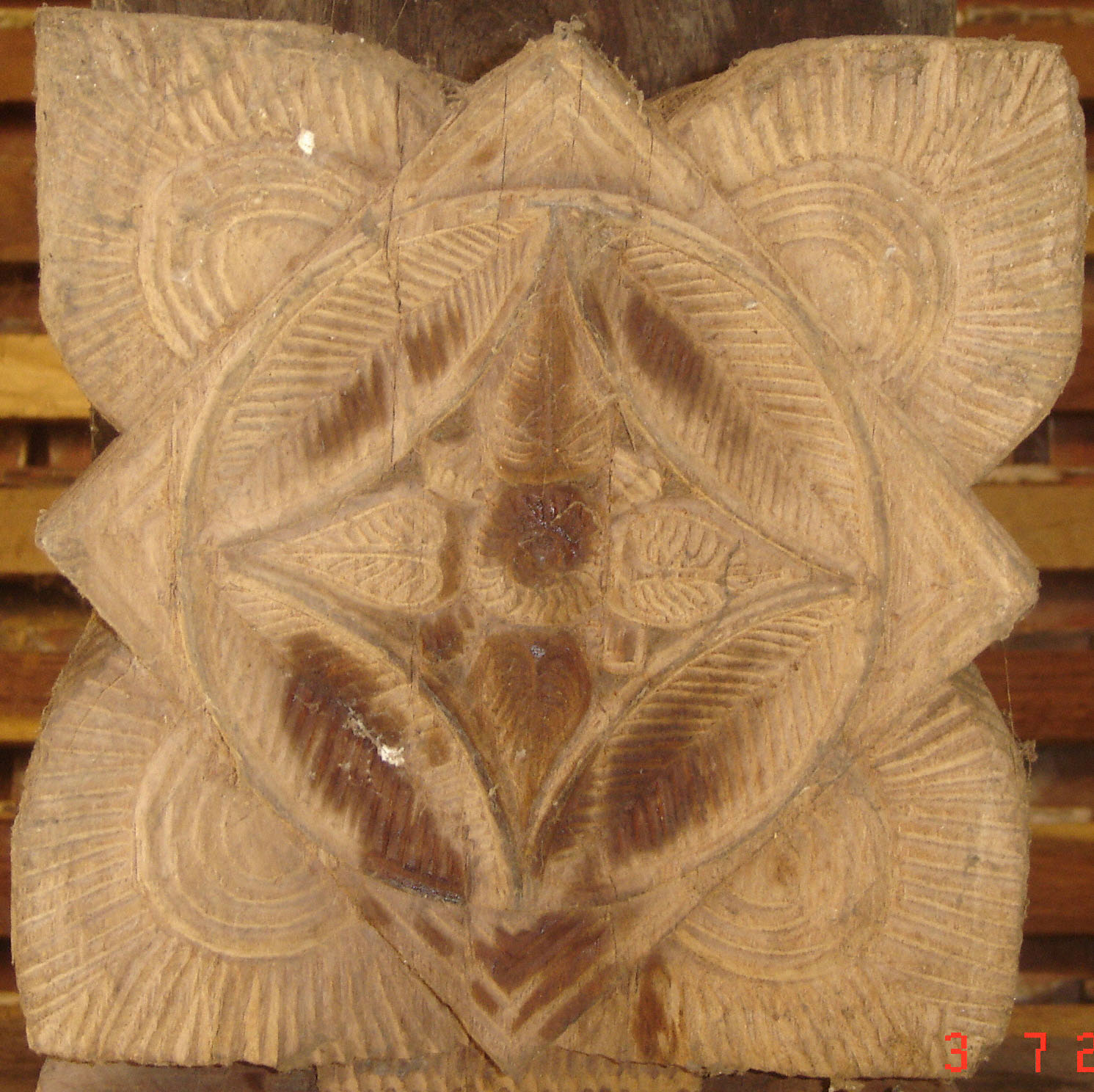
The Lotus from a decorative pekada.

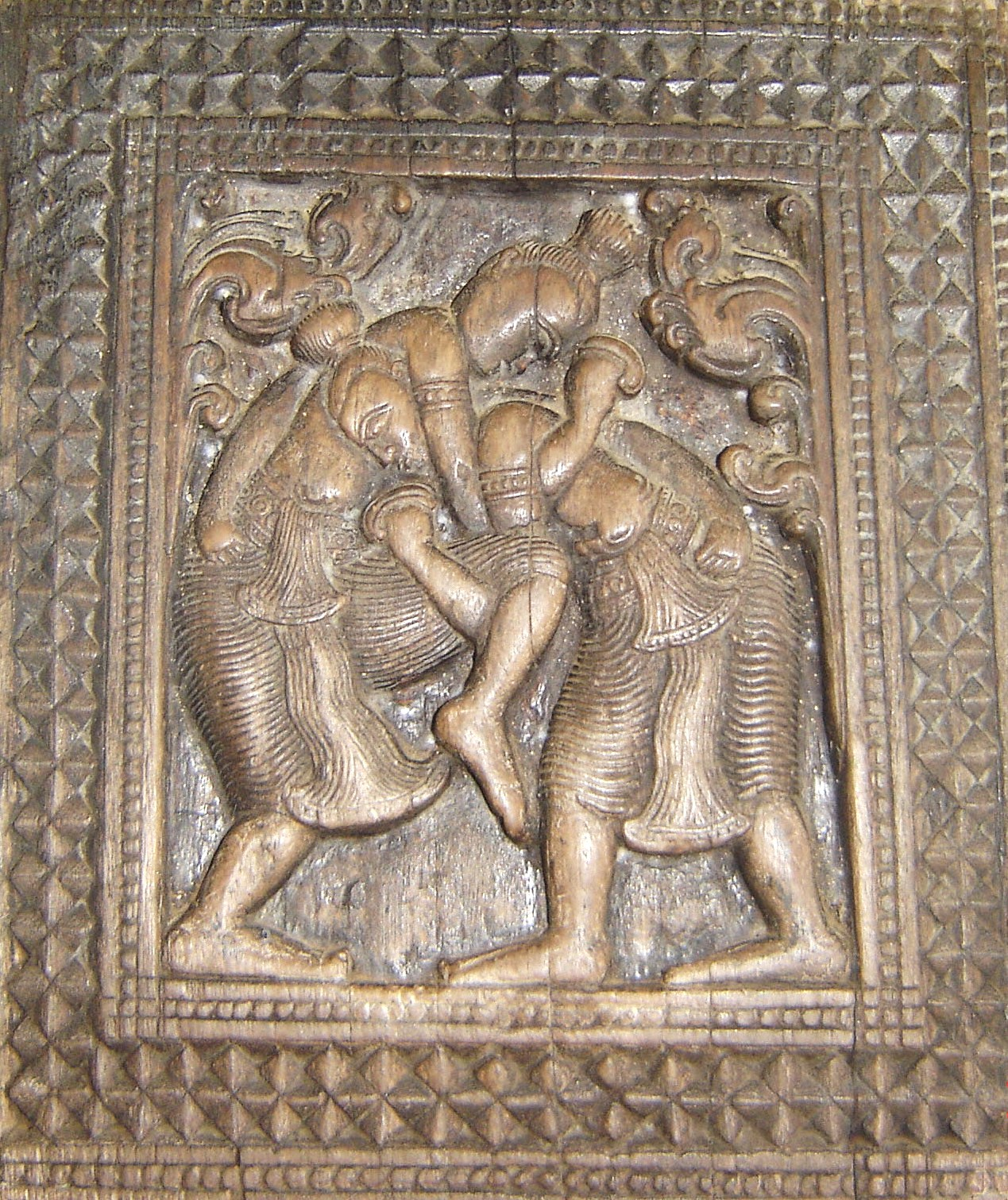
Image of two Angampora Fighters in one of the main locks.

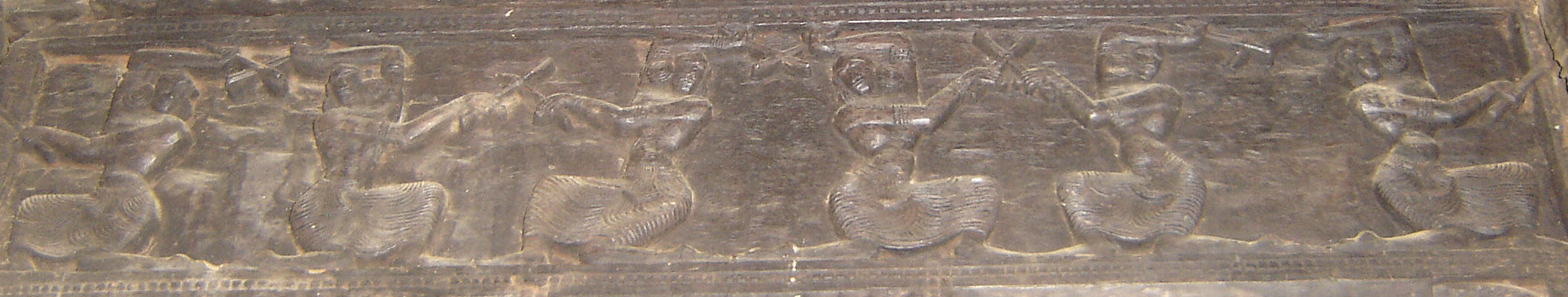
"Lee Keli", playing with wooden sticks or Stick Fighting (part of Angampora armed combat known as "Ilangam").

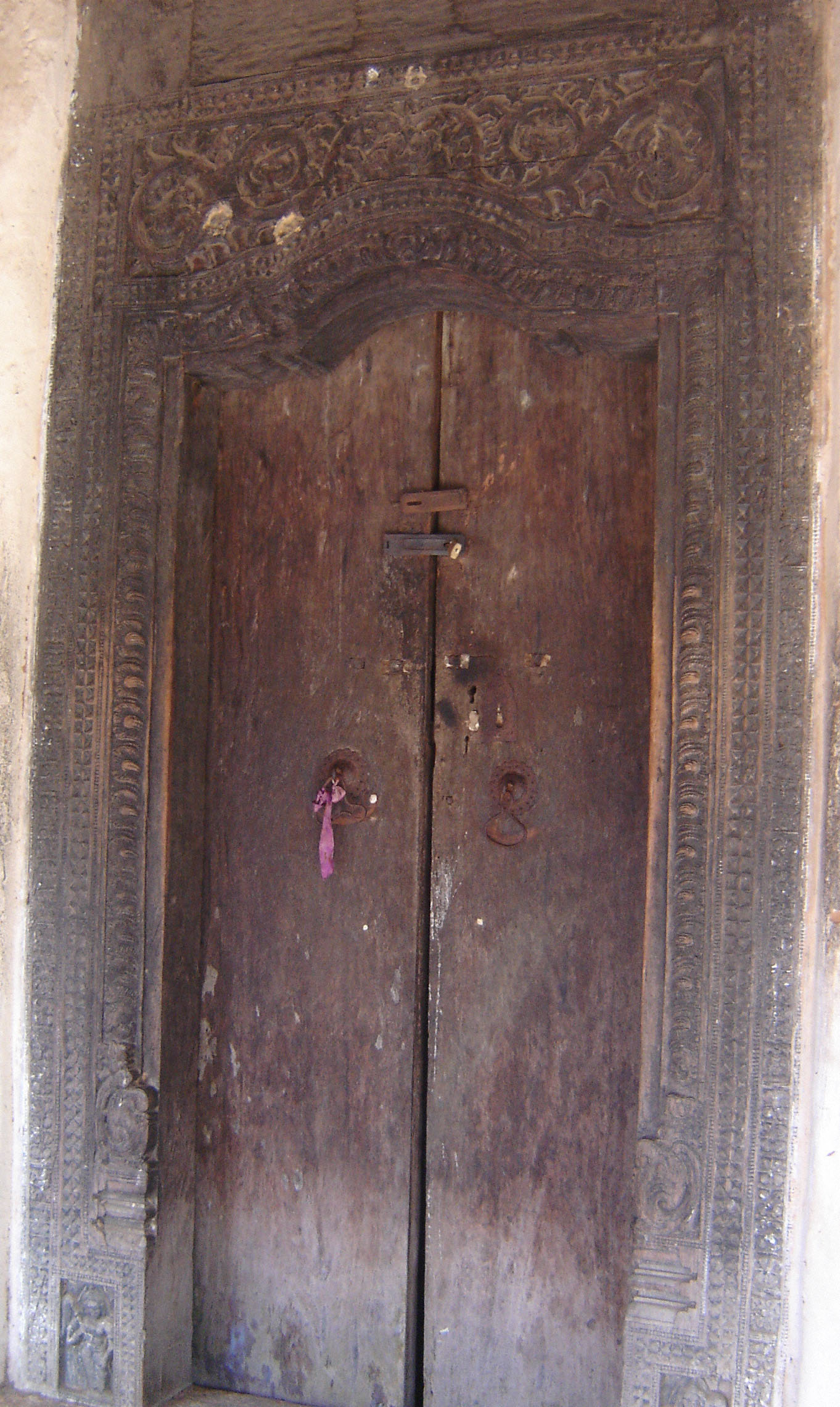
This door & frame is several hundred years old and taken from a King's Palace during Gampola Era.

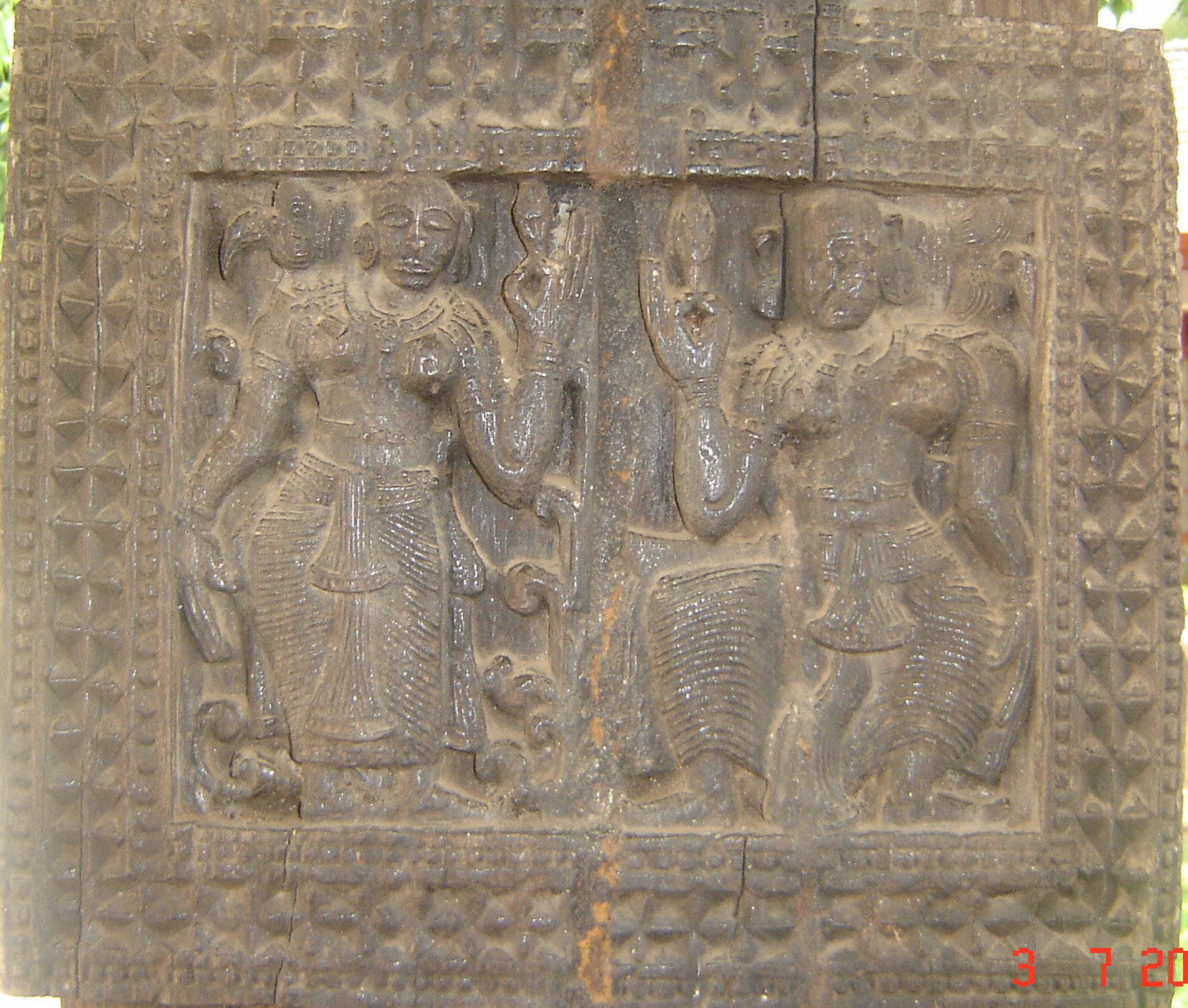
People in a chit chat.

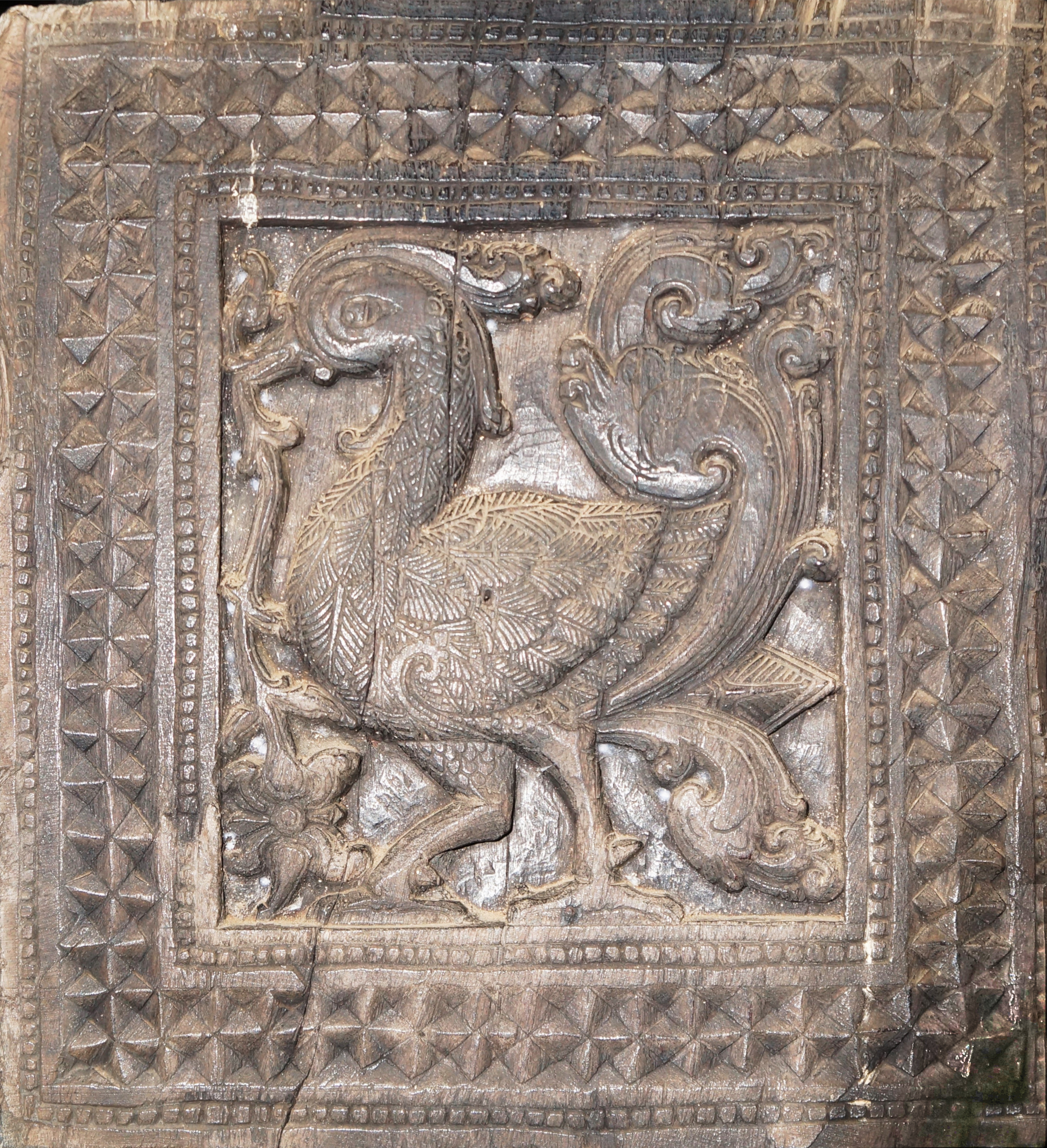
Le paon.- (boiserie)

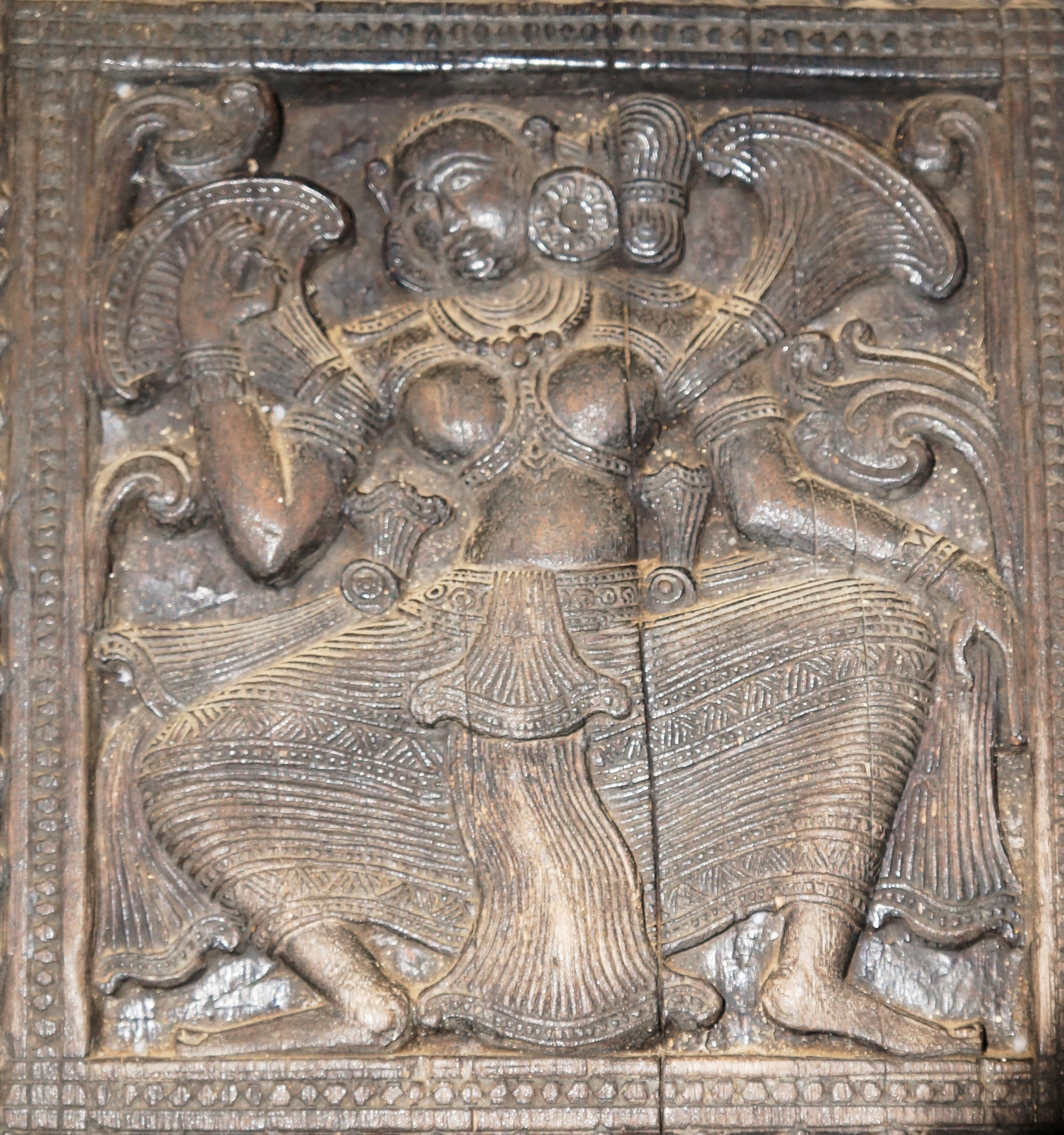
Apsara (boiserie)

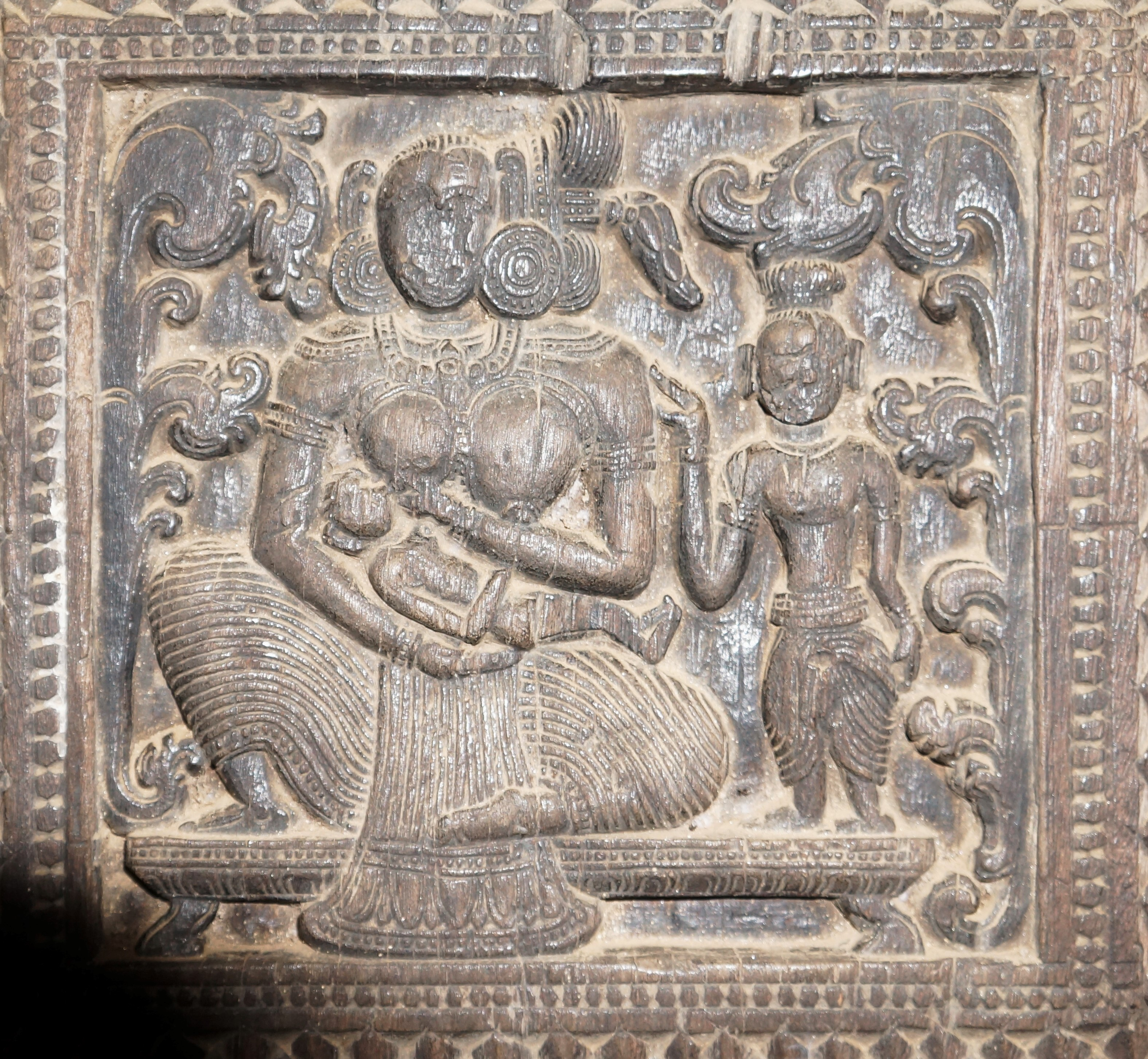
Nurse, (boiserie)

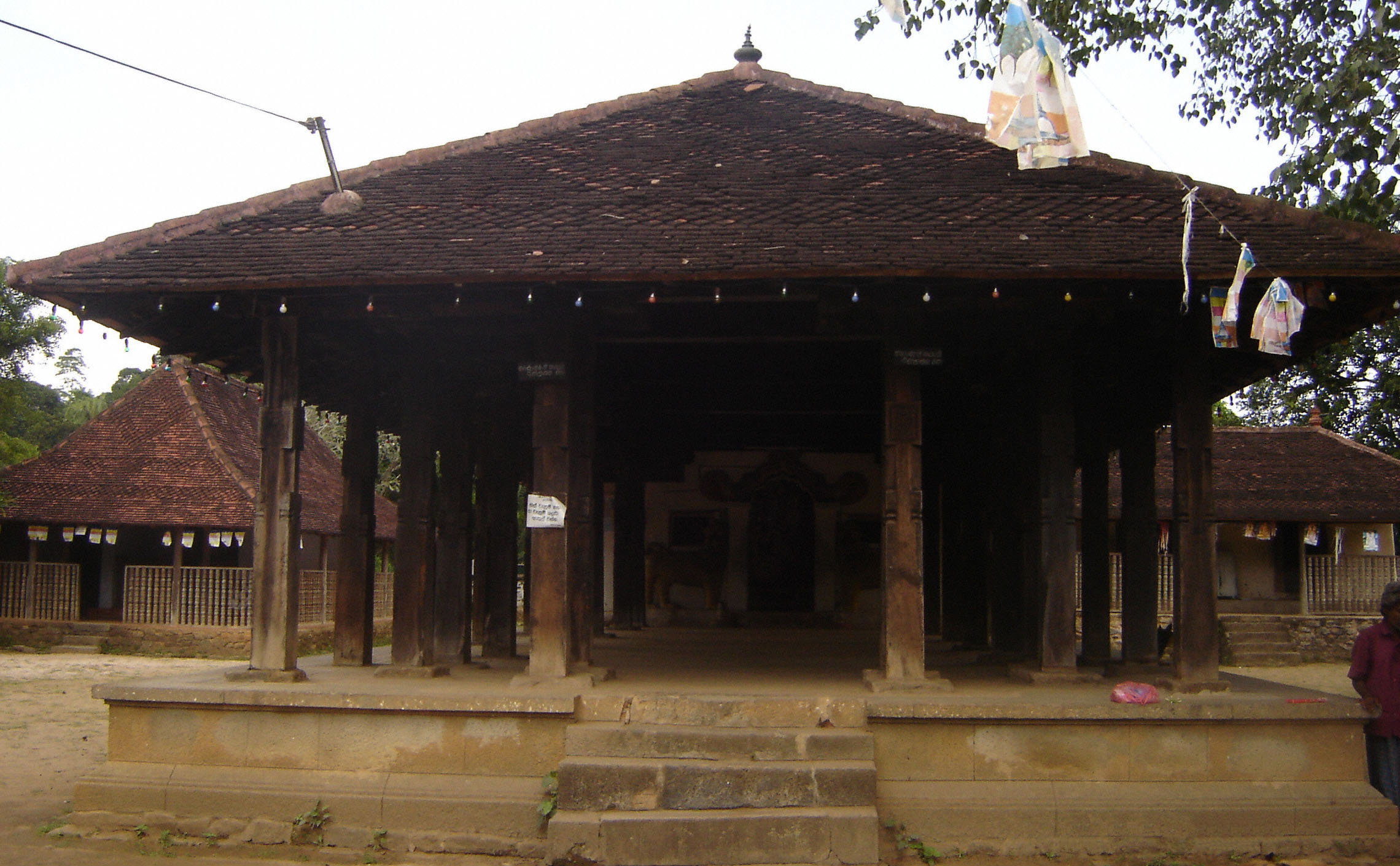
Drummers' Hall

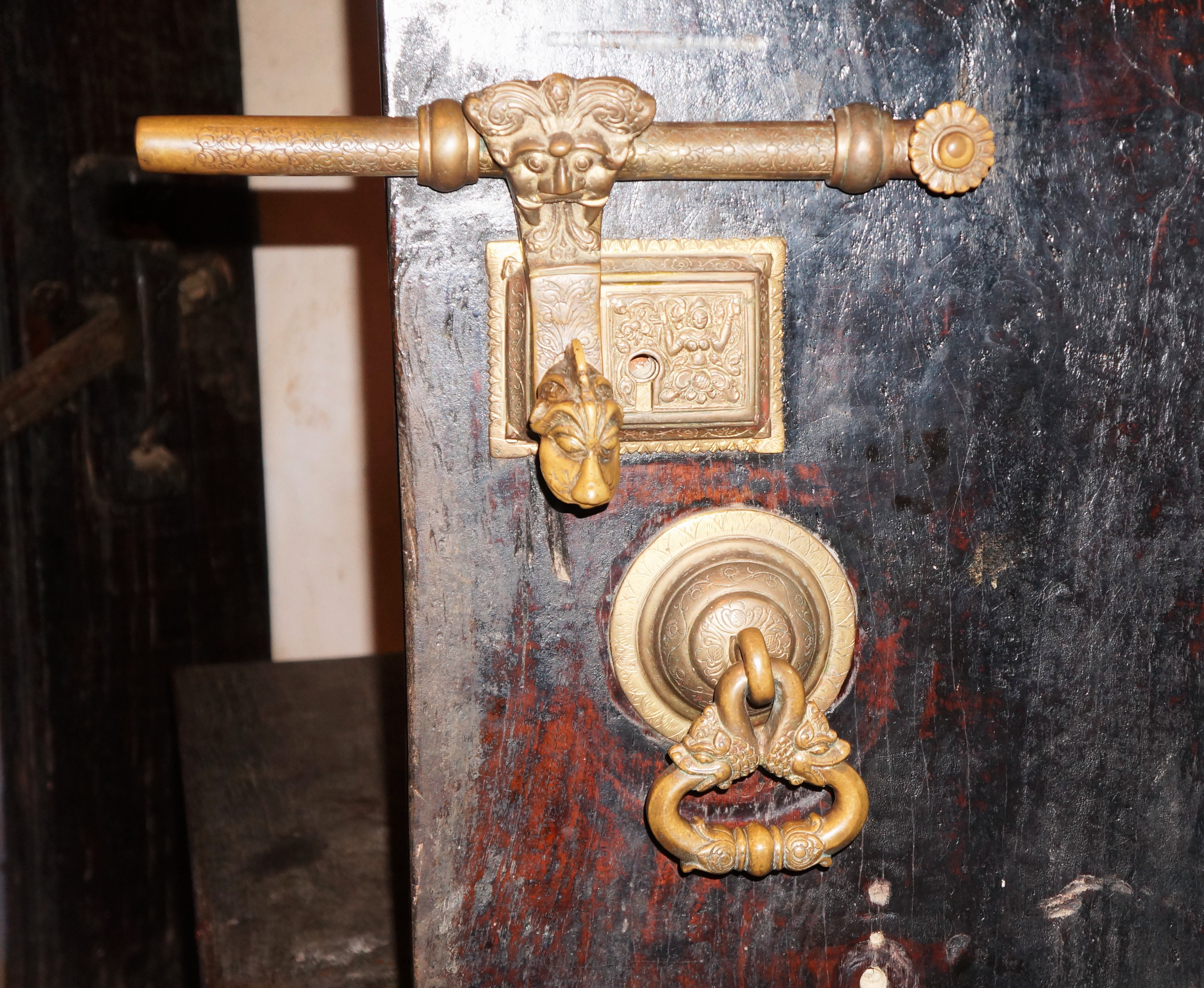
Door bolts

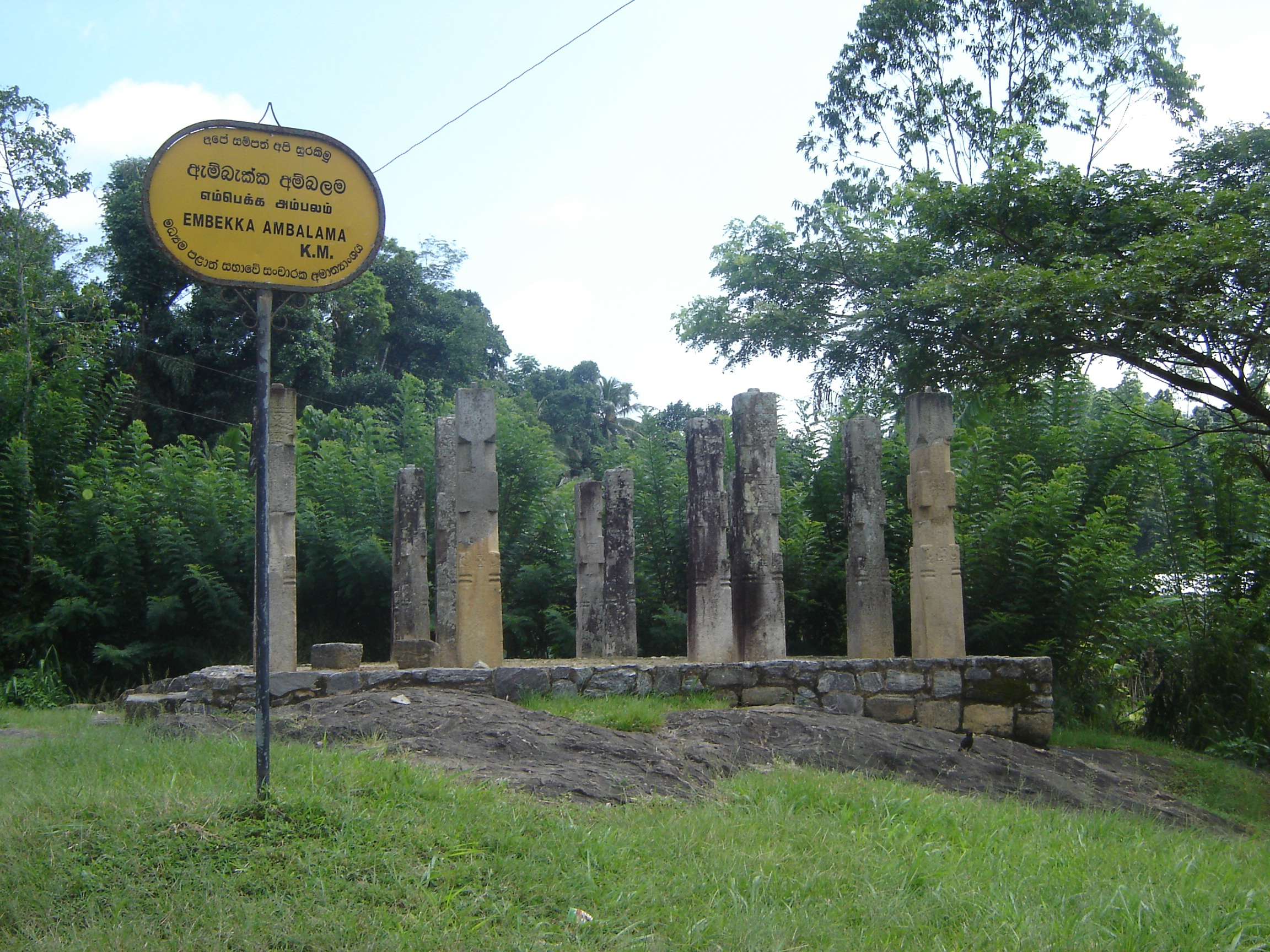
Ruins of Embekka Ambalama can be seen near the Devalaya.

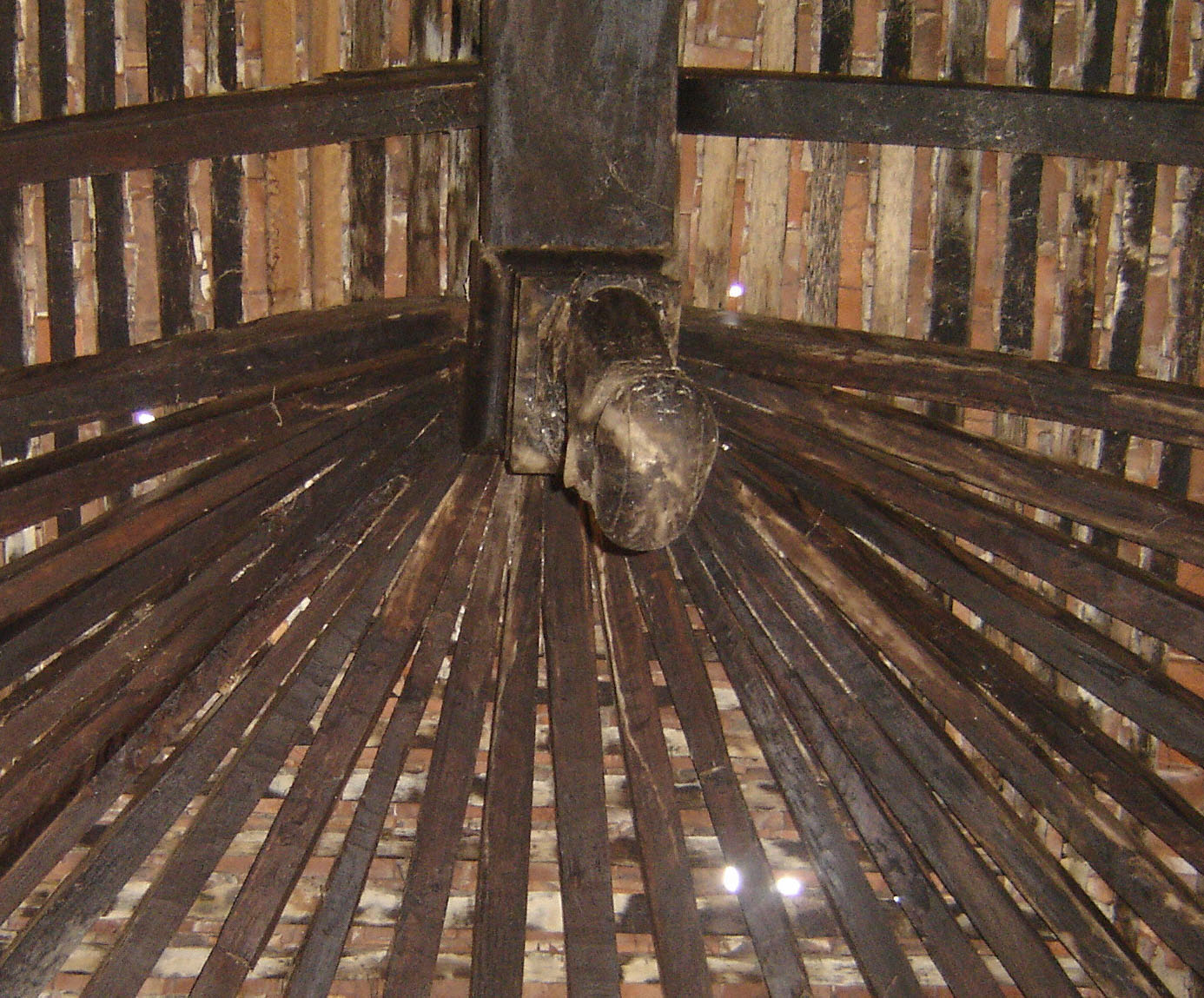
"Madol Kurupawa", pins 26 beams together.
