= Madol Kurupawa =

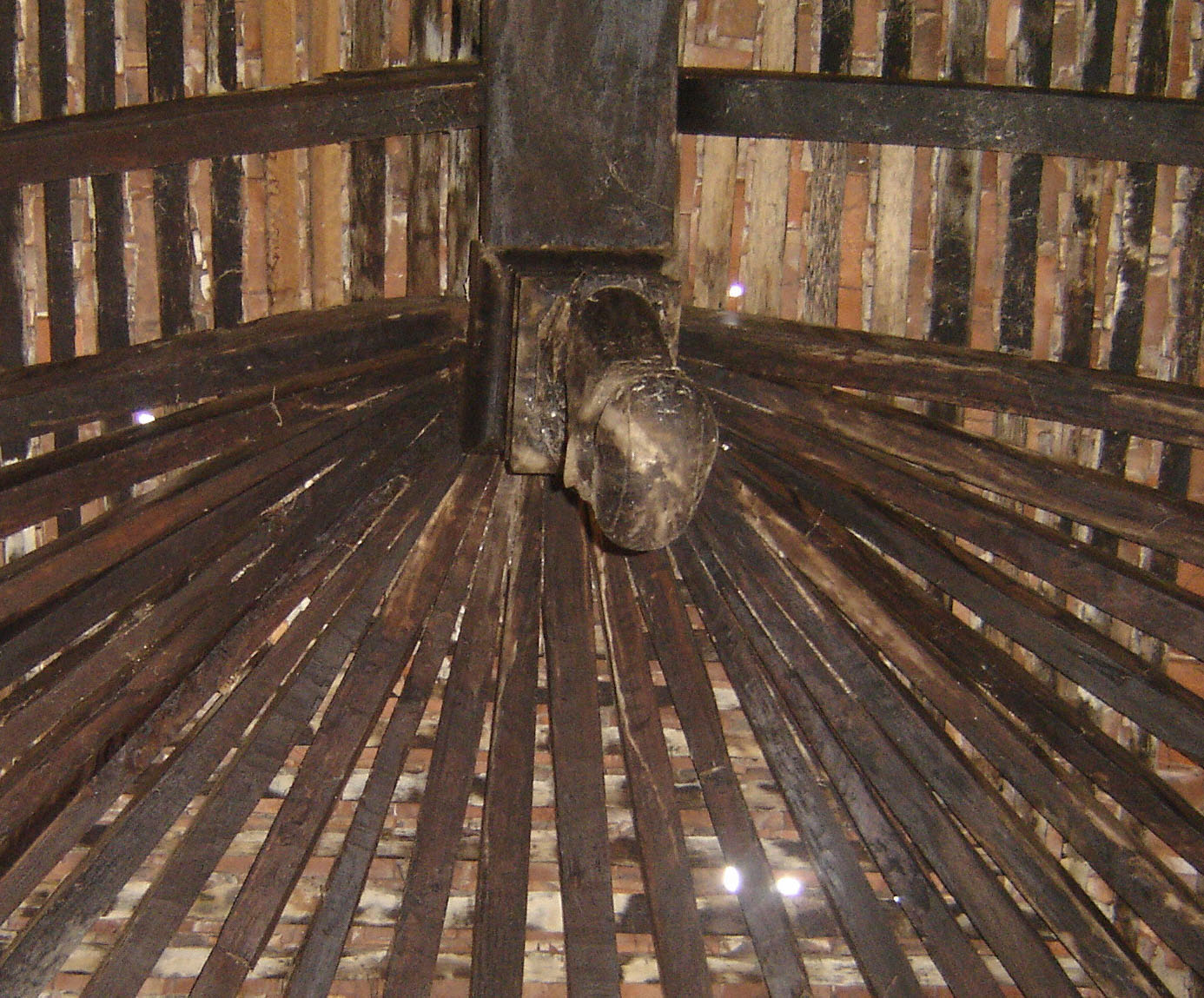
The Madol Kurupawa at Embekka Devalaya

Madol Kurupawa (Sinhala: මඩොල් කුරුපාව) is a wooden king post or catch pin, which is used to secure numerous wooden beams of a roof structure to a single point. It is a unique feature of Kandyan architecture/joinery.

This distinctive structural arrangement occurs in medieval Sri Lankan buildings, where four pitch roofs have been provided. Rafters of the shorter sides are elbowed against the ridge plate and were held fast at its pinnacle by a timber boss known as madol kurupawa, which in turn attached to the end of the wall plate. The pekada provides an intermediate means of connection between the pillars and beams, where a madol kurupawa provides similar means between the rafters and ridge plate at shorter side of the pitched roof. No mechanical joinery (nails, bolts or glue) is used other than the wooden pegs and the structural stability is only achieved through compression.

The most notable example can be found at Embekka Devalaya in Udunuwara, (built during the reign of King Rajadhi Rajasingha), where the upper ends of twenty six rafters are held together using a modol kurupawa at the hip end of the 'Digge' (dancing hall). Another example can be found at the National Museum of Kandy.

== See also ==
- Embekka Devalaya
- Pekada
