= Pekada =

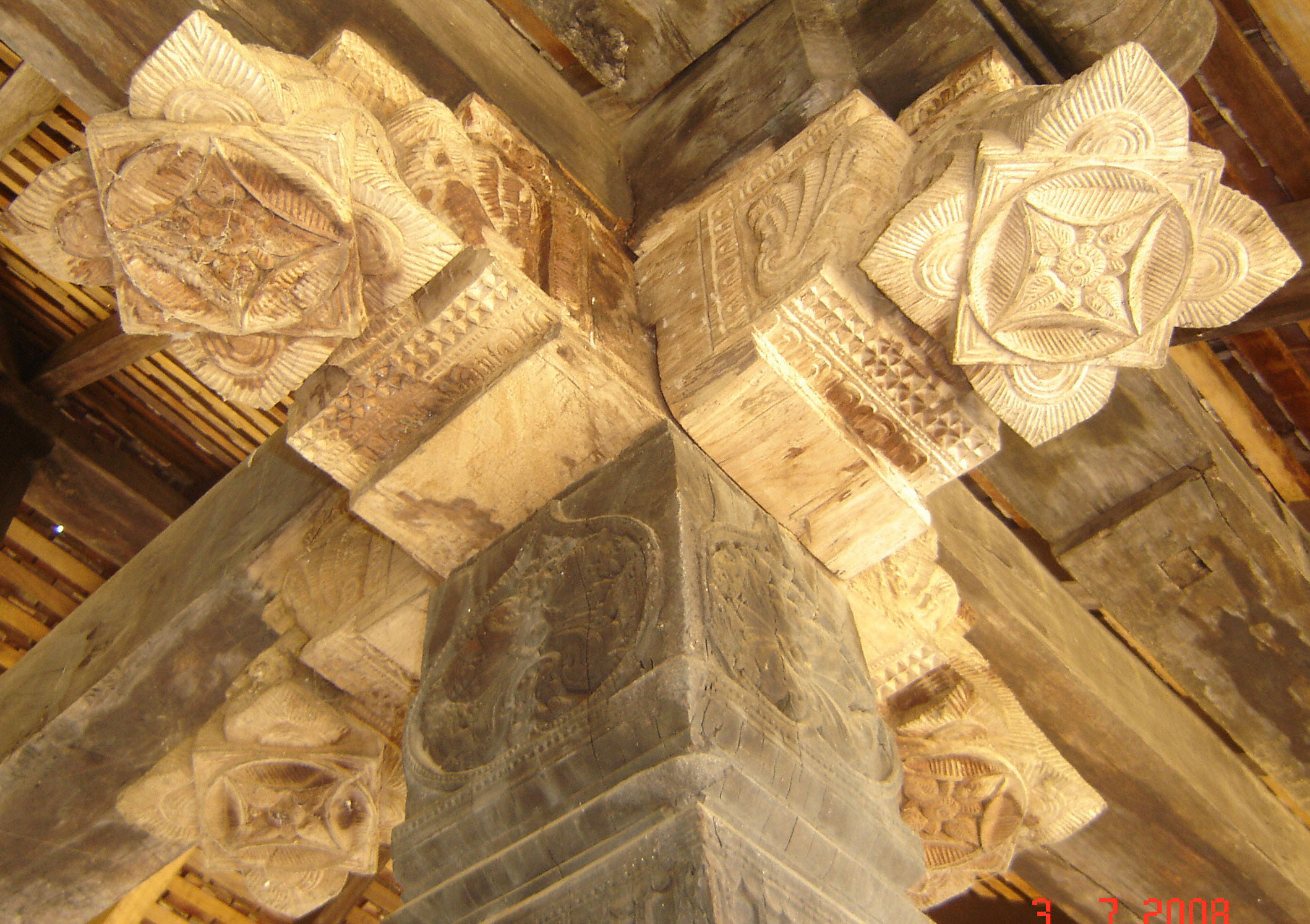
A carved wooden pekada at Embekka Devalaya

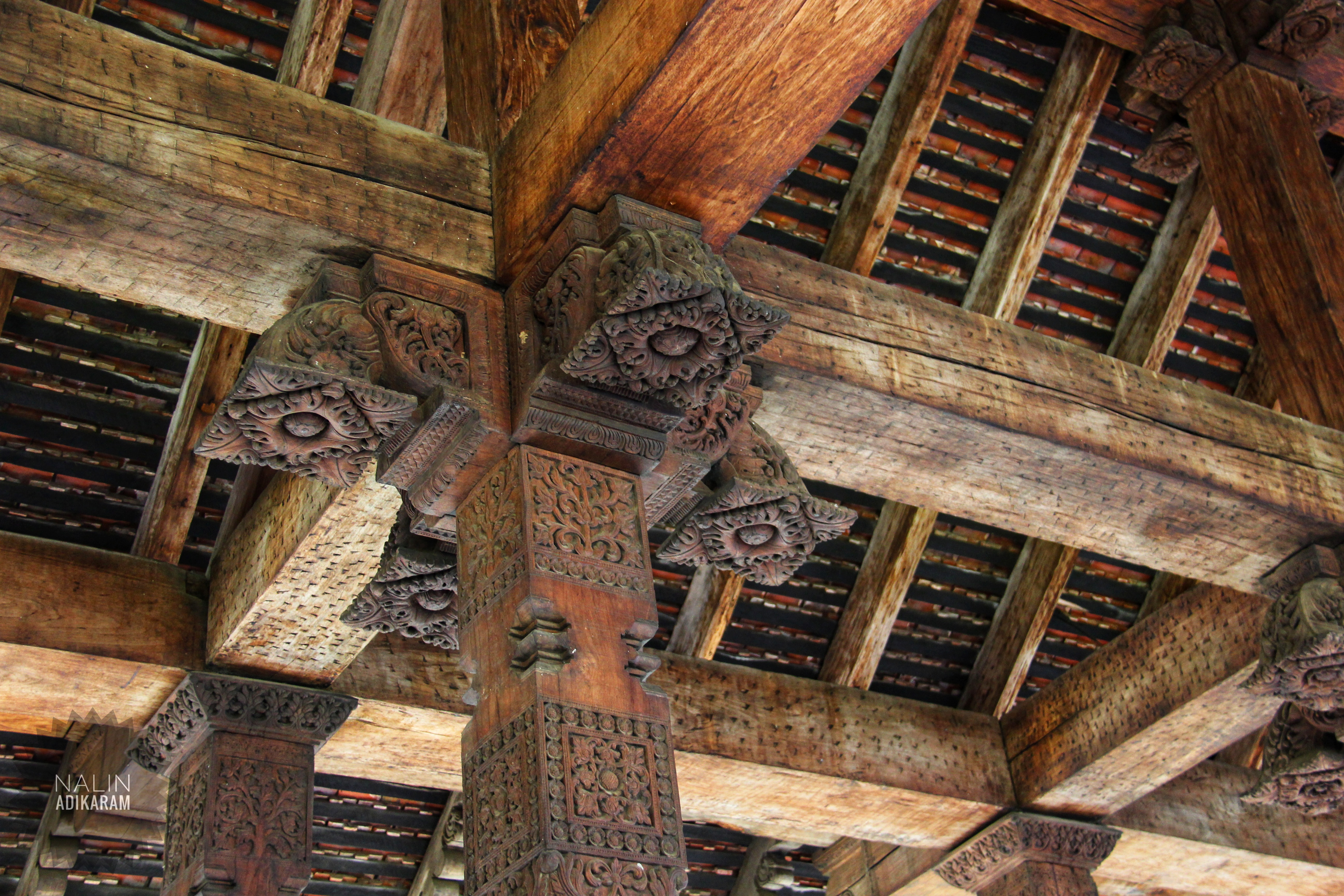
A carved wooden pekada at Magul Maduwa, Kandy

Pekada (Sinhala: පේකඩ), or pekadaya, are the decorative wooden pillar heads/brackets at the top of a stone or wooden column (or a pilaster), known as kapa, supporting a beam or dandu. It is a unique feature of Kandyan architecture.

The pekada is a cubic intermediate structural element in joinery and the interface between a beam and a column, which transfers the load from the roof to the ground. It is a separately carved capital or bracket which intervenes between a pillar and a beam which it is to carry. The pekada is made of two pieces, fitting together, and when these are crossed together, the four faced bracket is completed; the top of the pillar itself is mortised into the bracket through the centre of the parts crossed. This form of arrangement allows a certain amount of flexibility whilst maintaining the structural stability of the beam and pillar. Pekada provides a method of transferring lateral as well as vertical loads of beams (especially when they cross at right angles) to pillars without inducing high local stresses at the connection points.

Pekadas date from the Gampola period (1341-1415) but were more predominantly used during the Kandyan period (1591–1815).

Pekadas can be still seen clearly in Ambalama (wayside rest structures), the Magul Maduwa or Royal Audience Hall in Kandy and the Embekka Devalaya (built during the reign of King Rajadhi Rajasingha). They are designed to be viewed from below and feature traditional pendant (inverted) lotus or binara mala motifs, often with the figure of a dancer in the downward face of the flower or a bird in place of the petals. Pekadas have also been used on more modern buildings such as the Trinity College Chapel, where they have been carved out of Gummalu, a local hardwood and the Lake House building, where they are constructed out of concrete.

== See also ==
- Kandyan roof
- Madol Kurupawa
