= Kazerun =

City in Fars province, Iran

Kazerun کازرون (Persian) Kazarvan (Temple of Zurvan)
- City
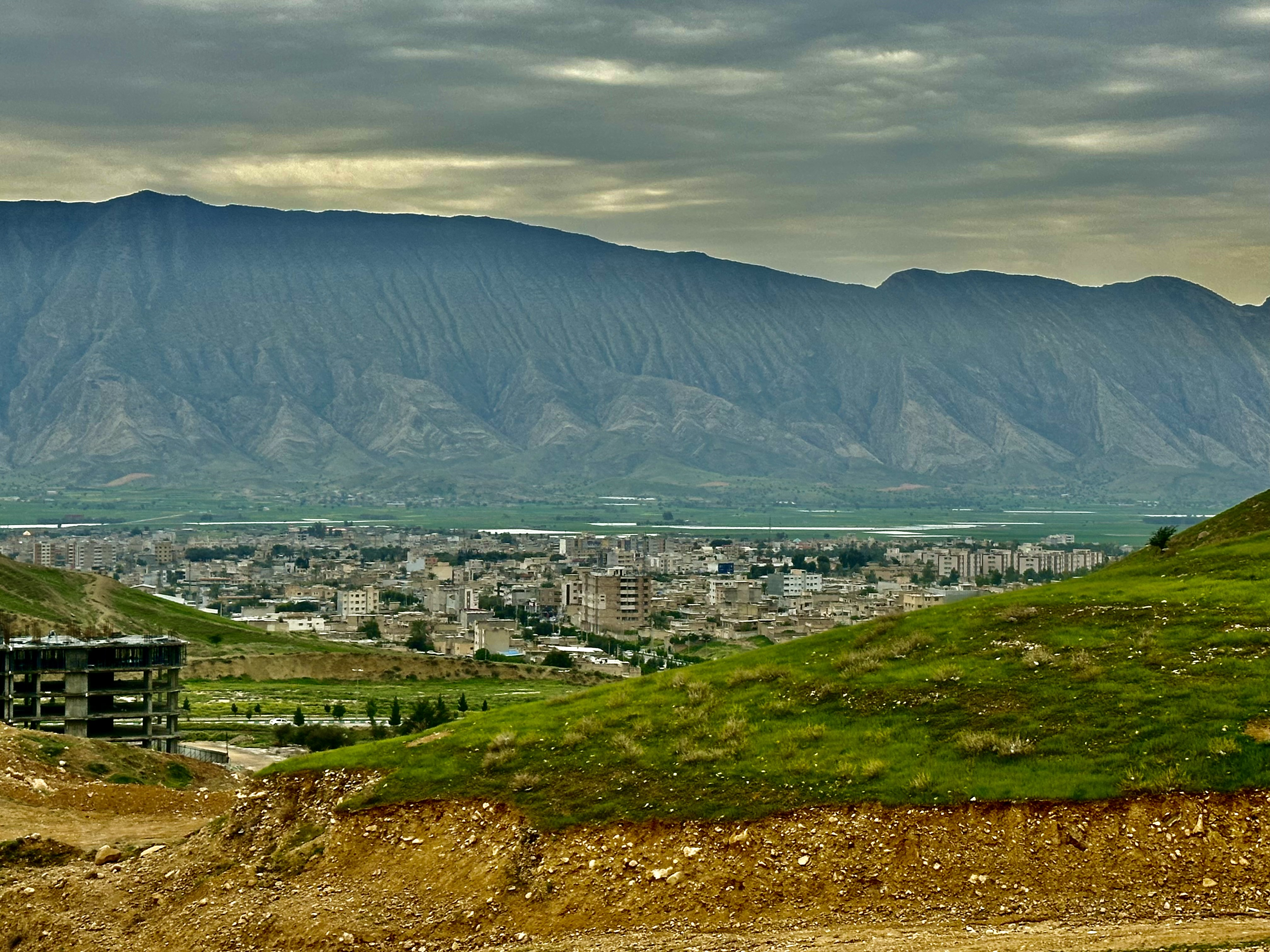
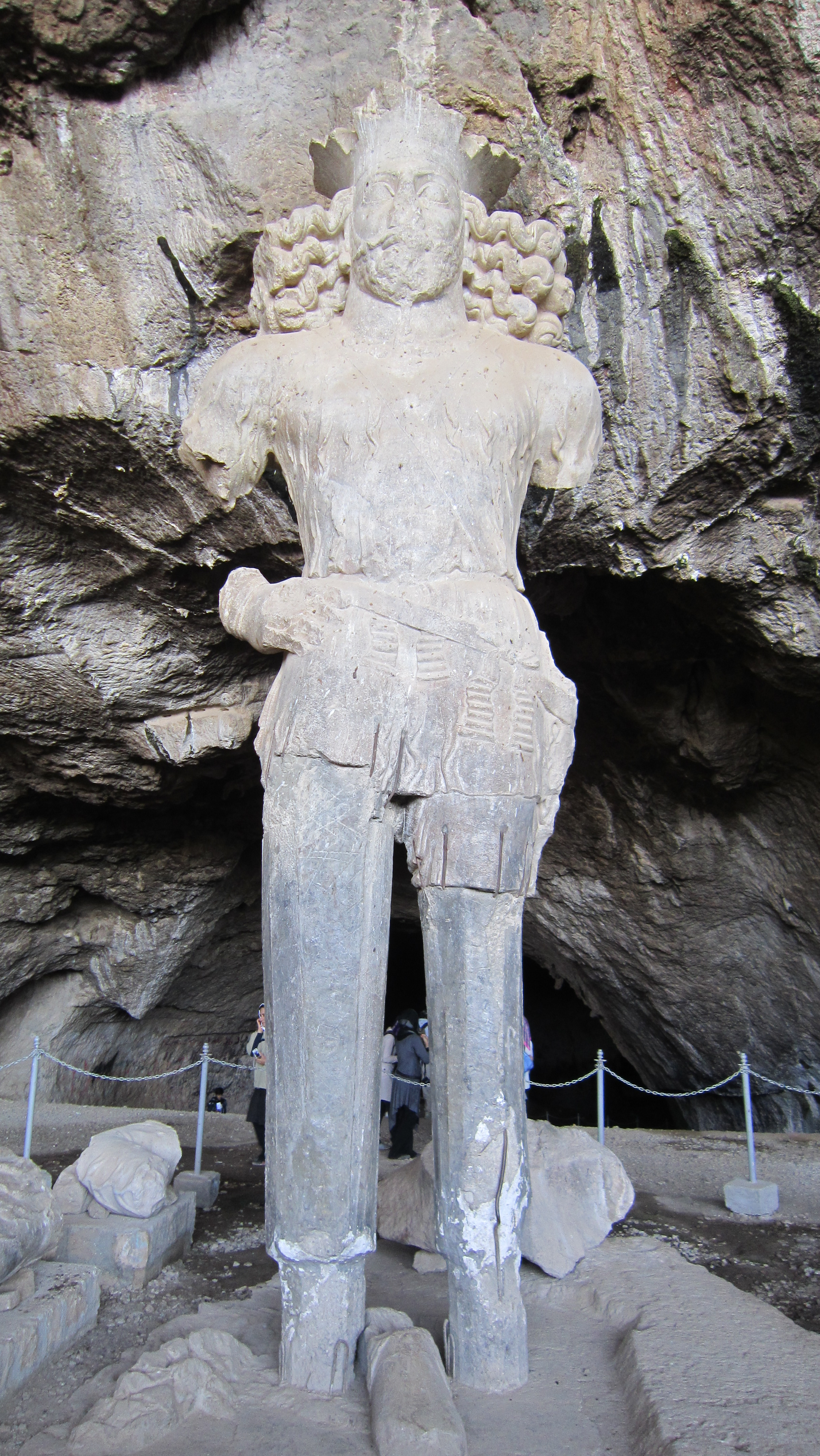
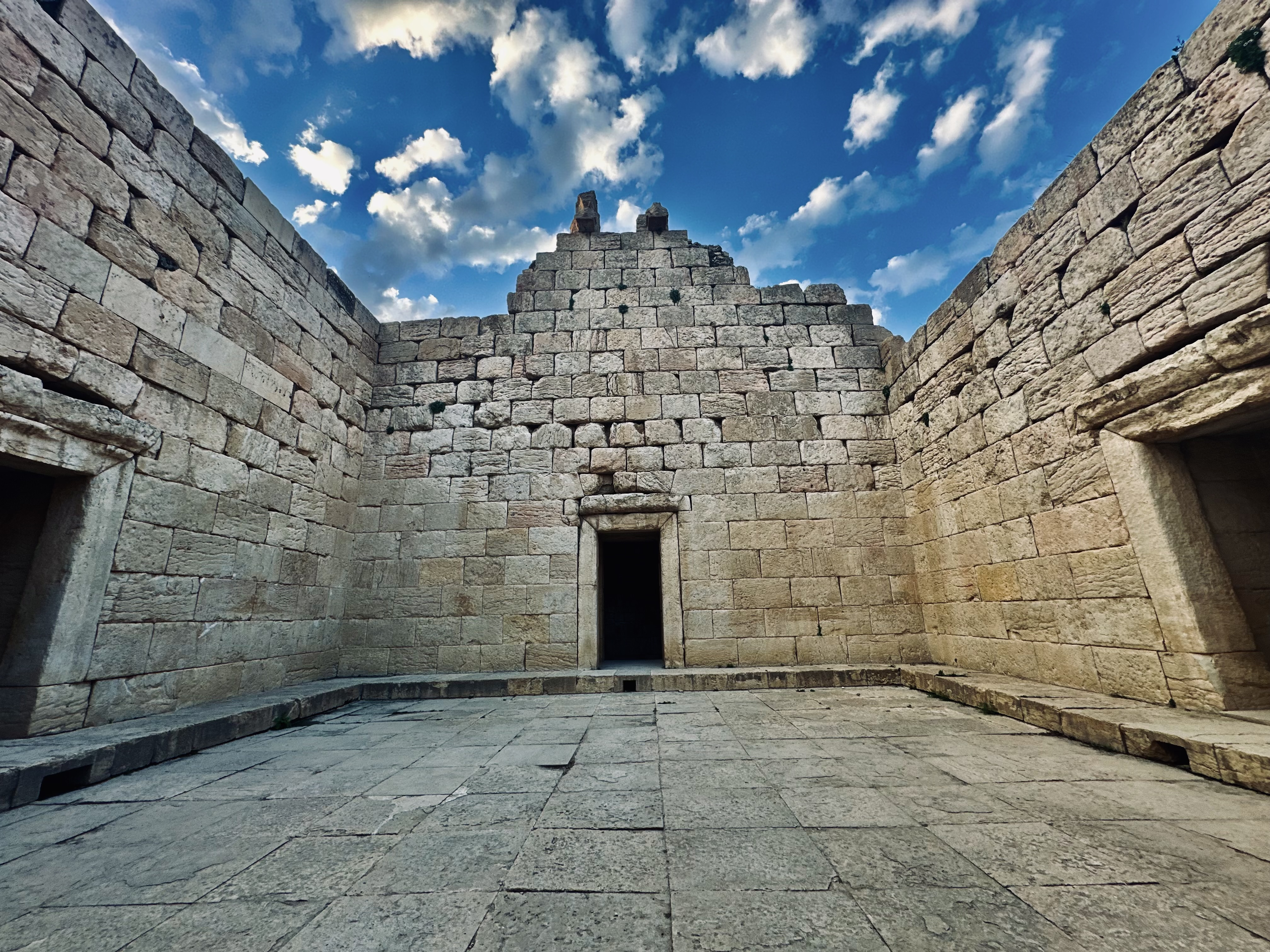
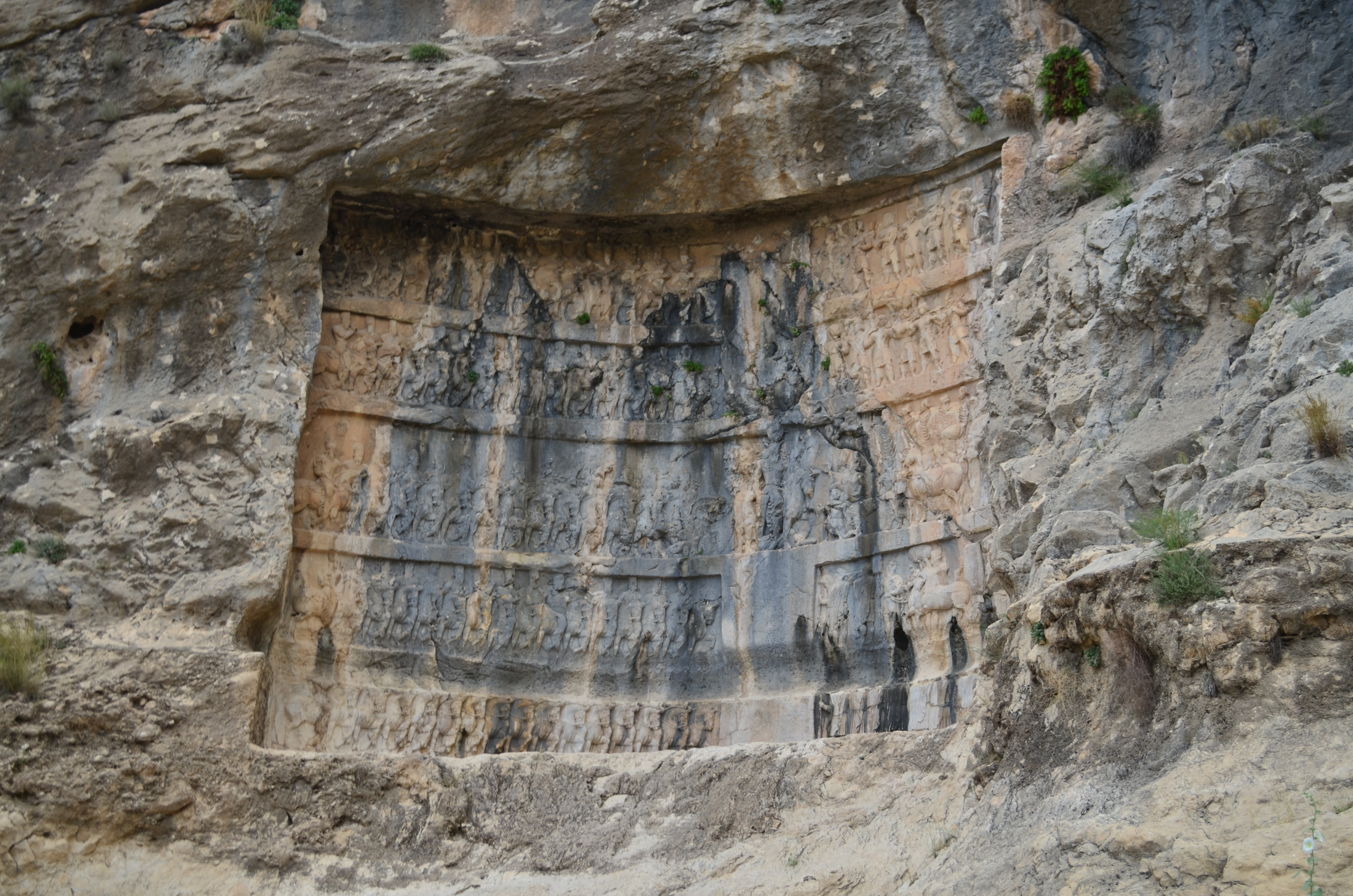
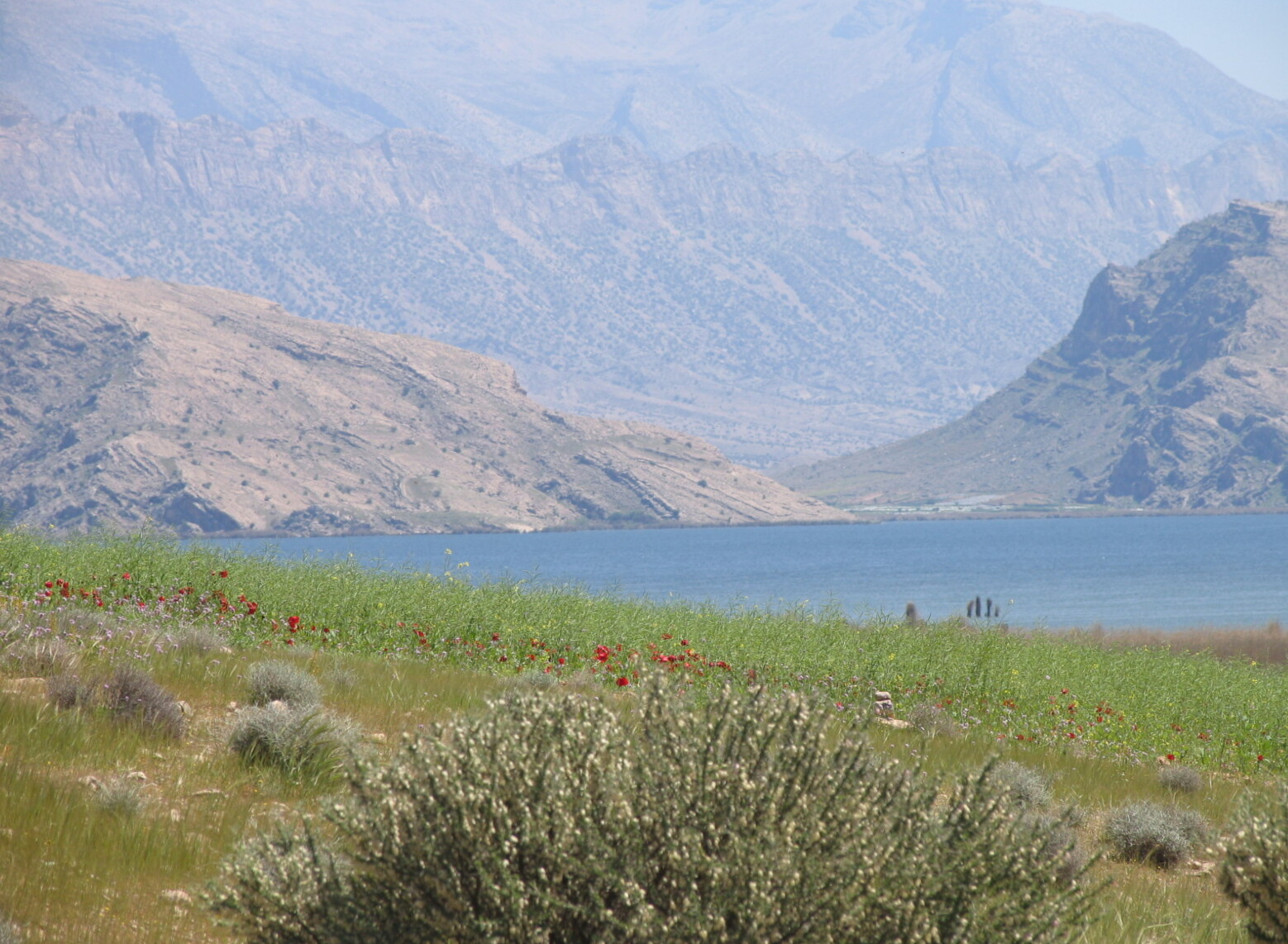
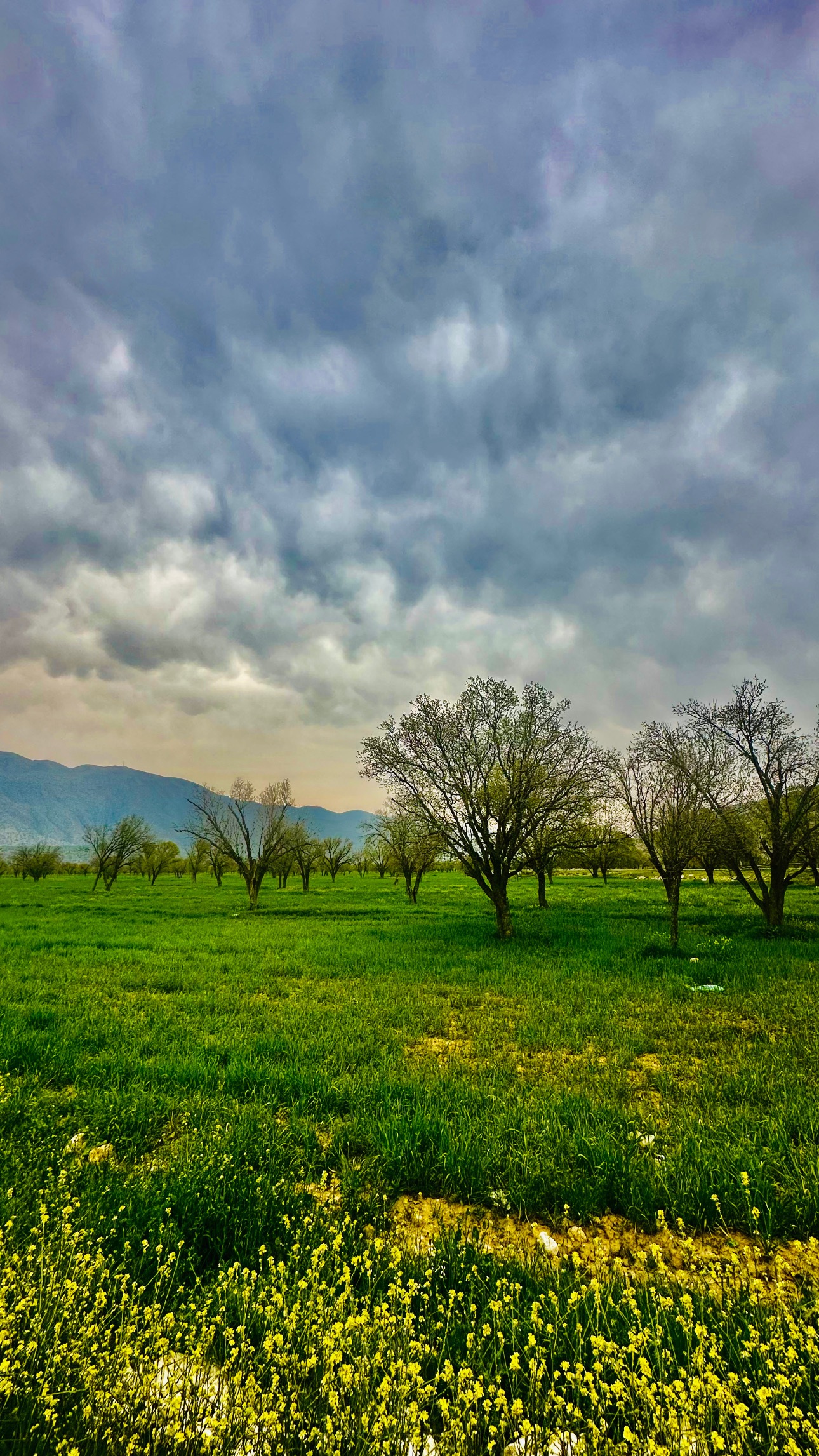
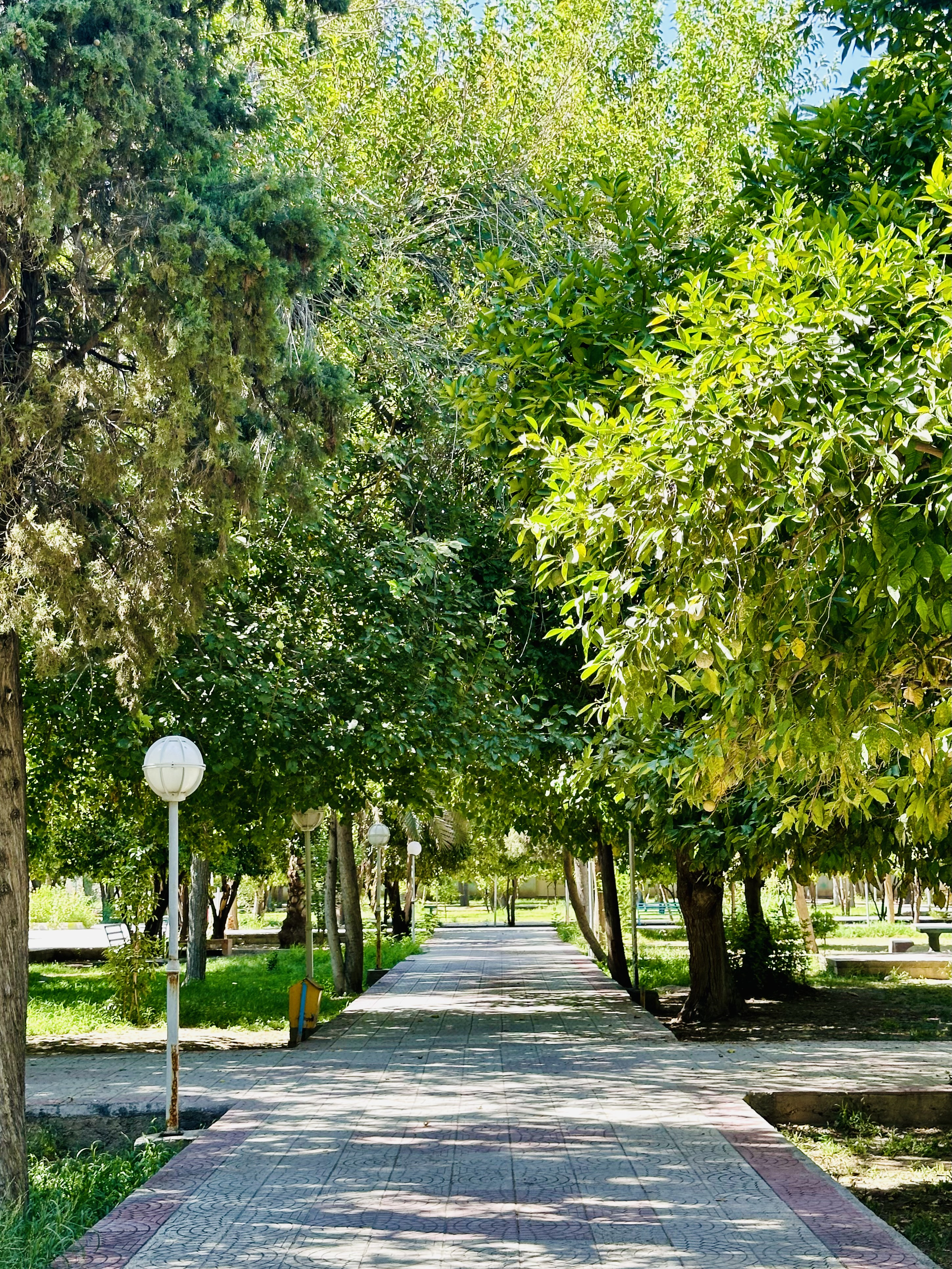
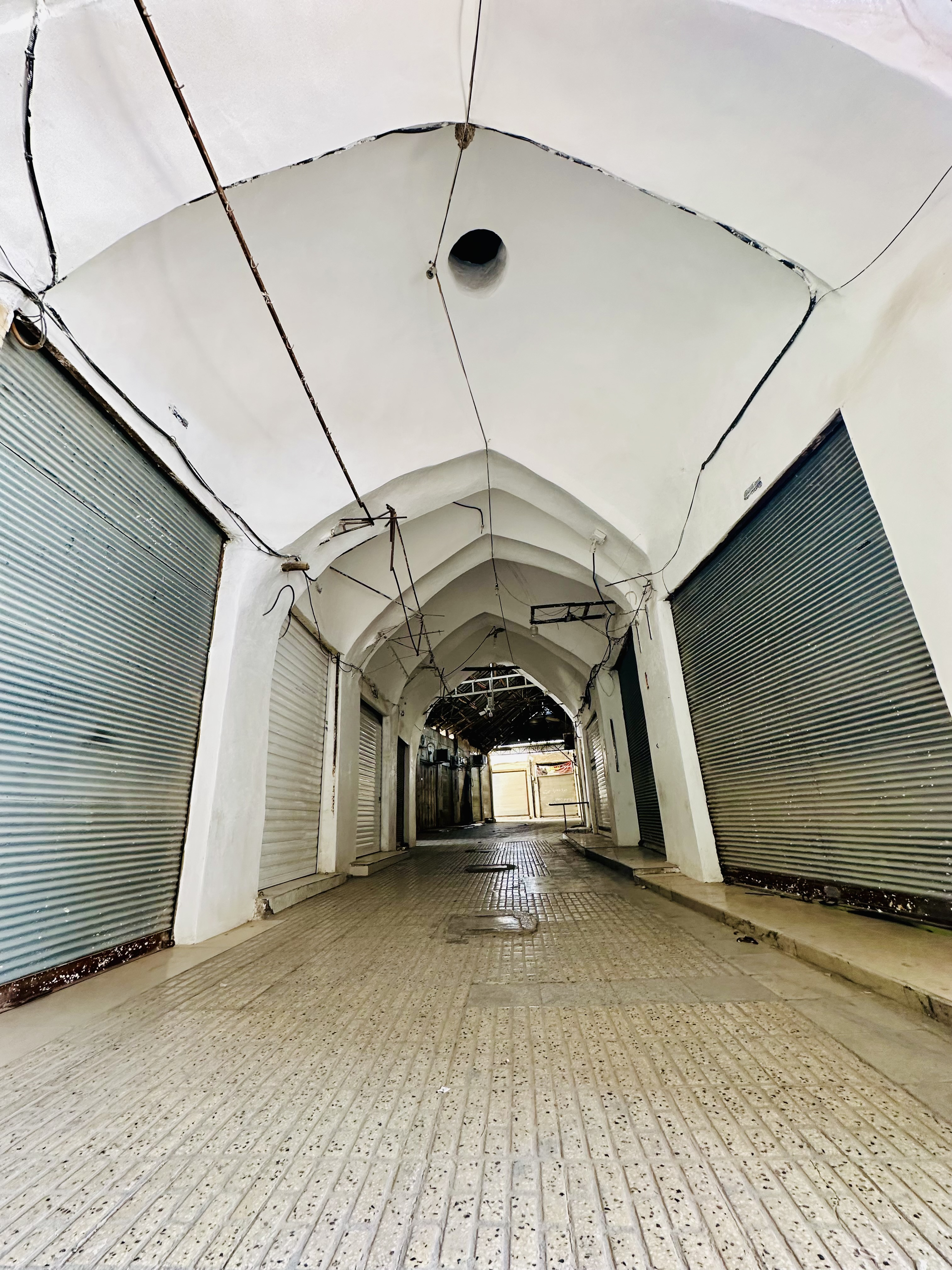
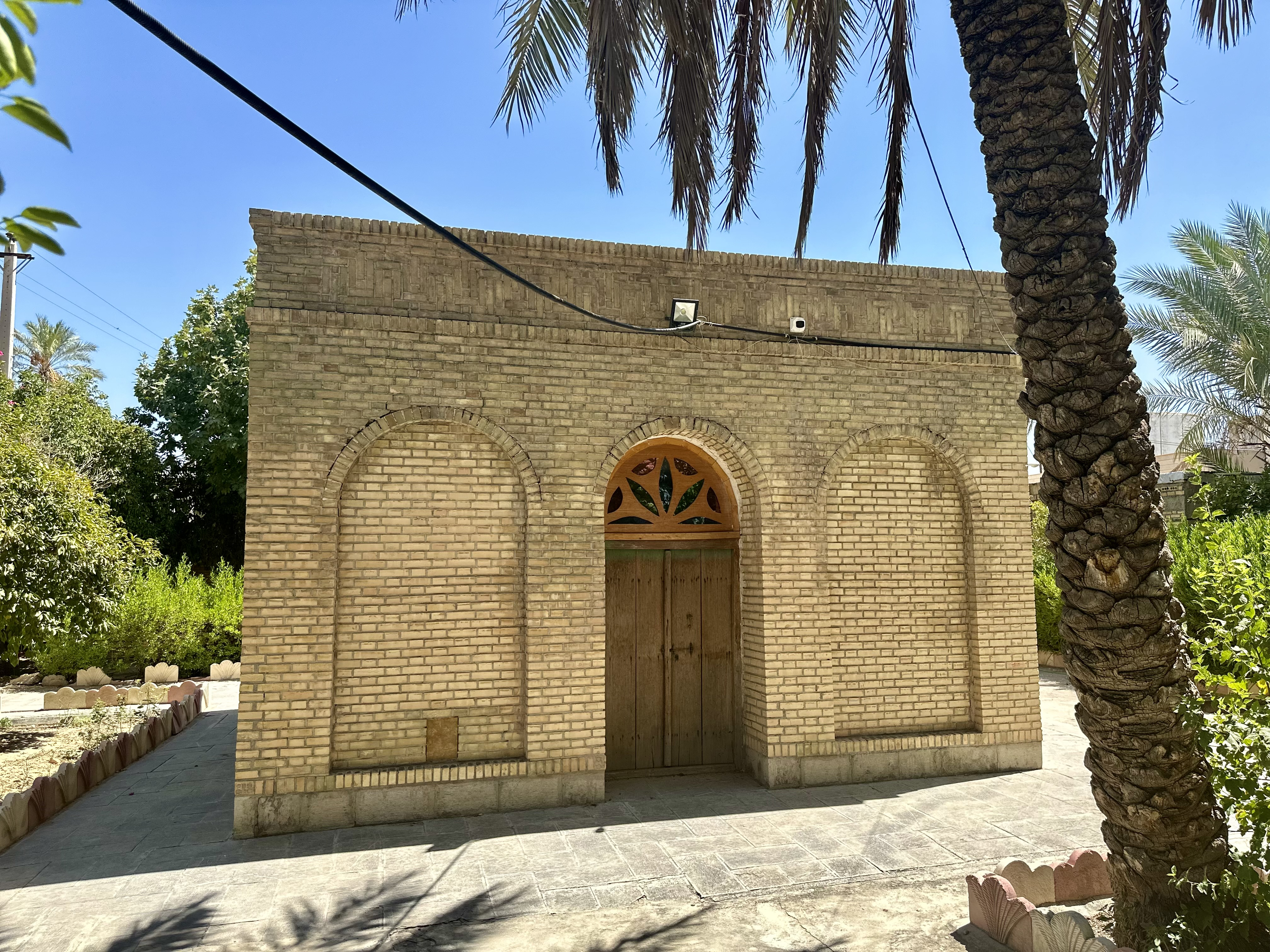
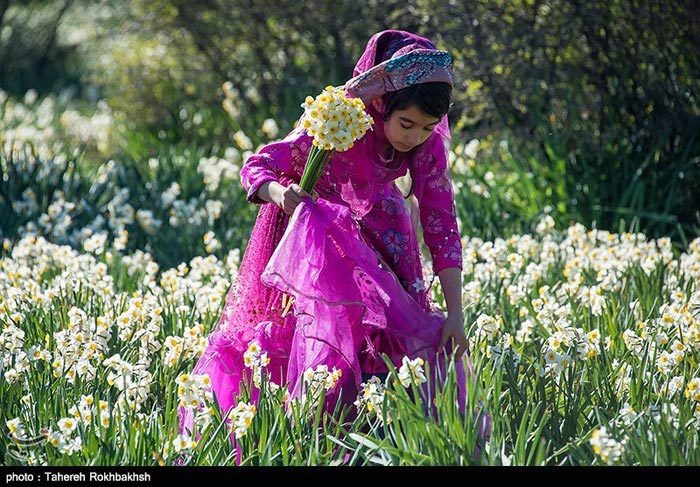
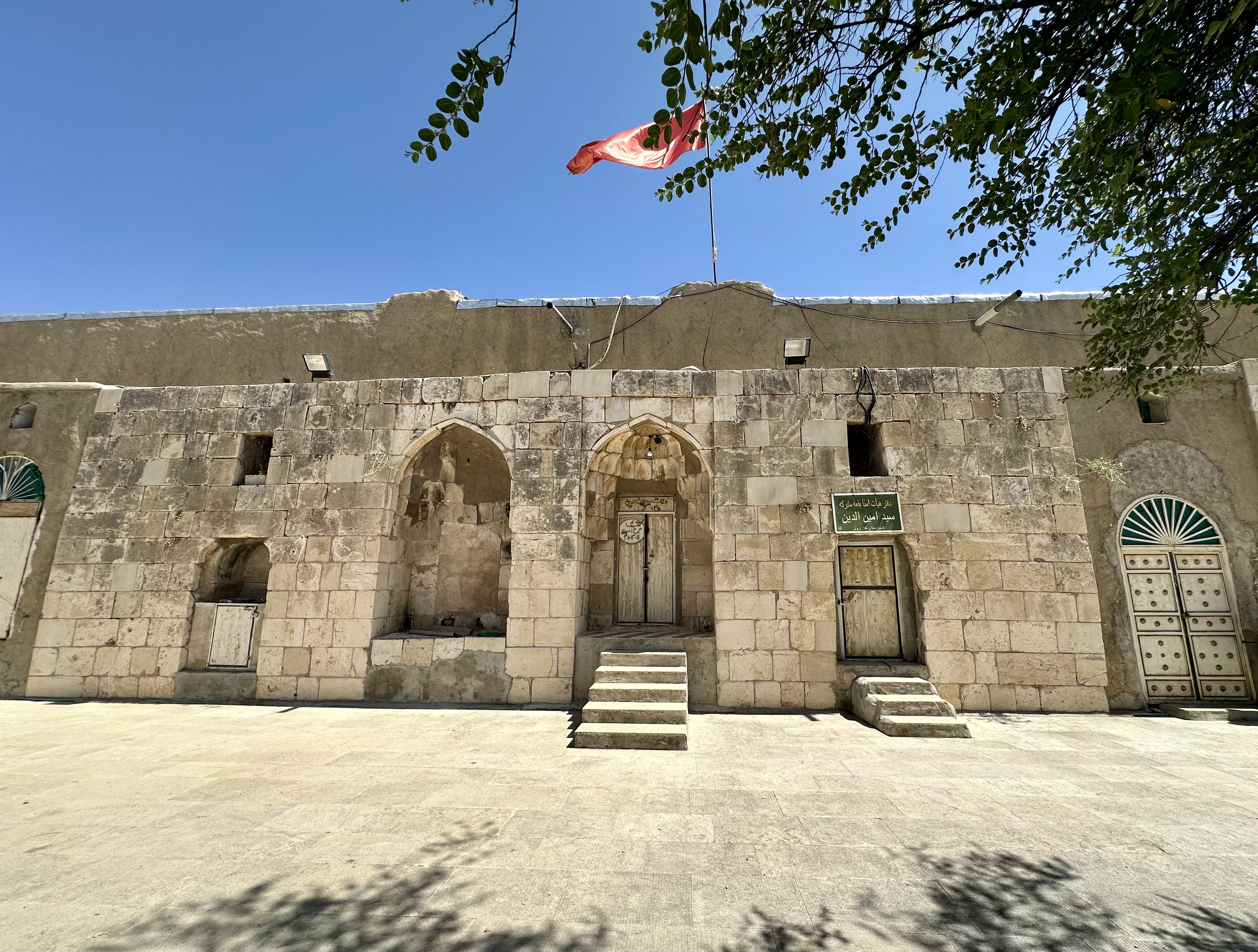
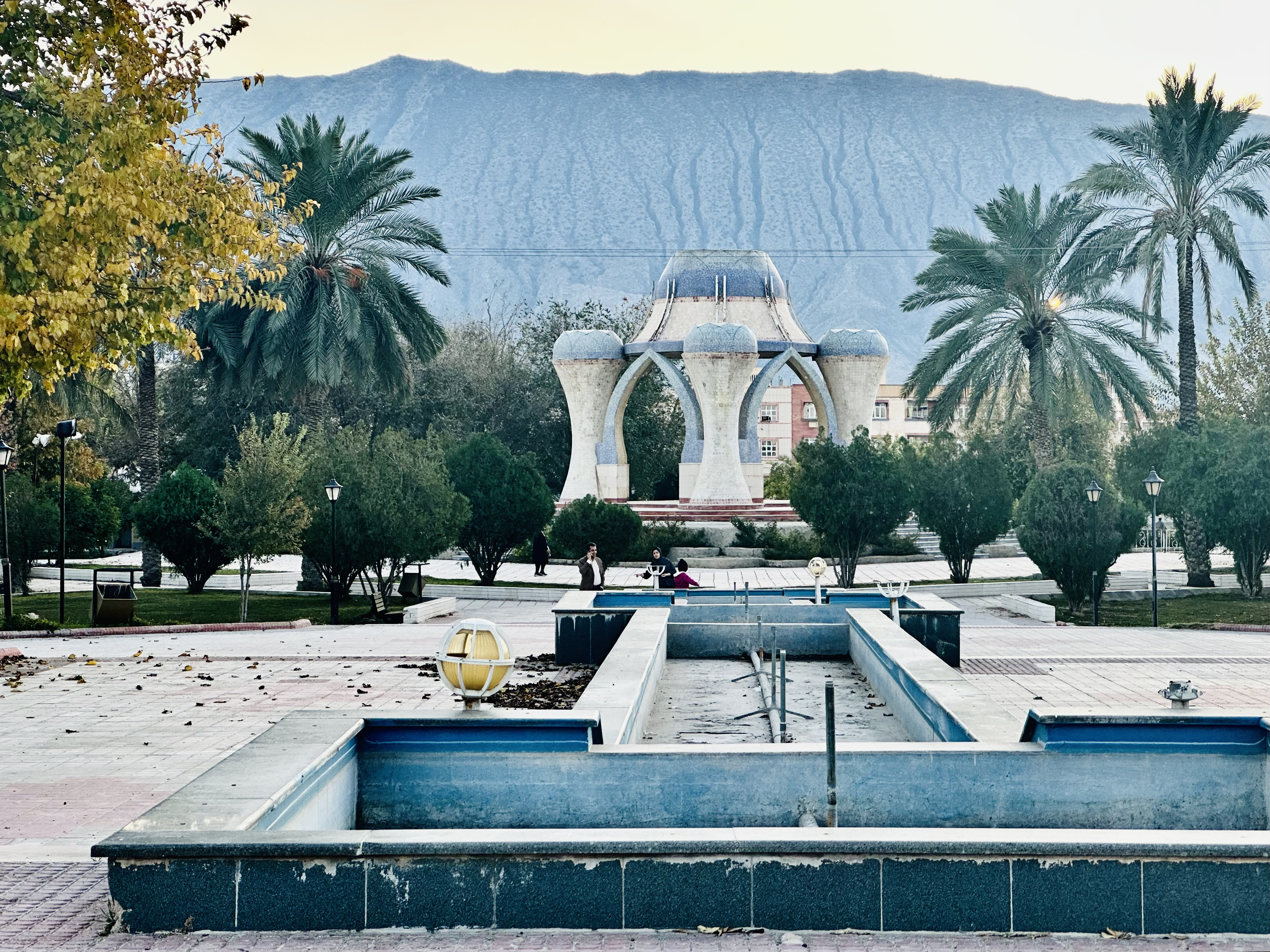
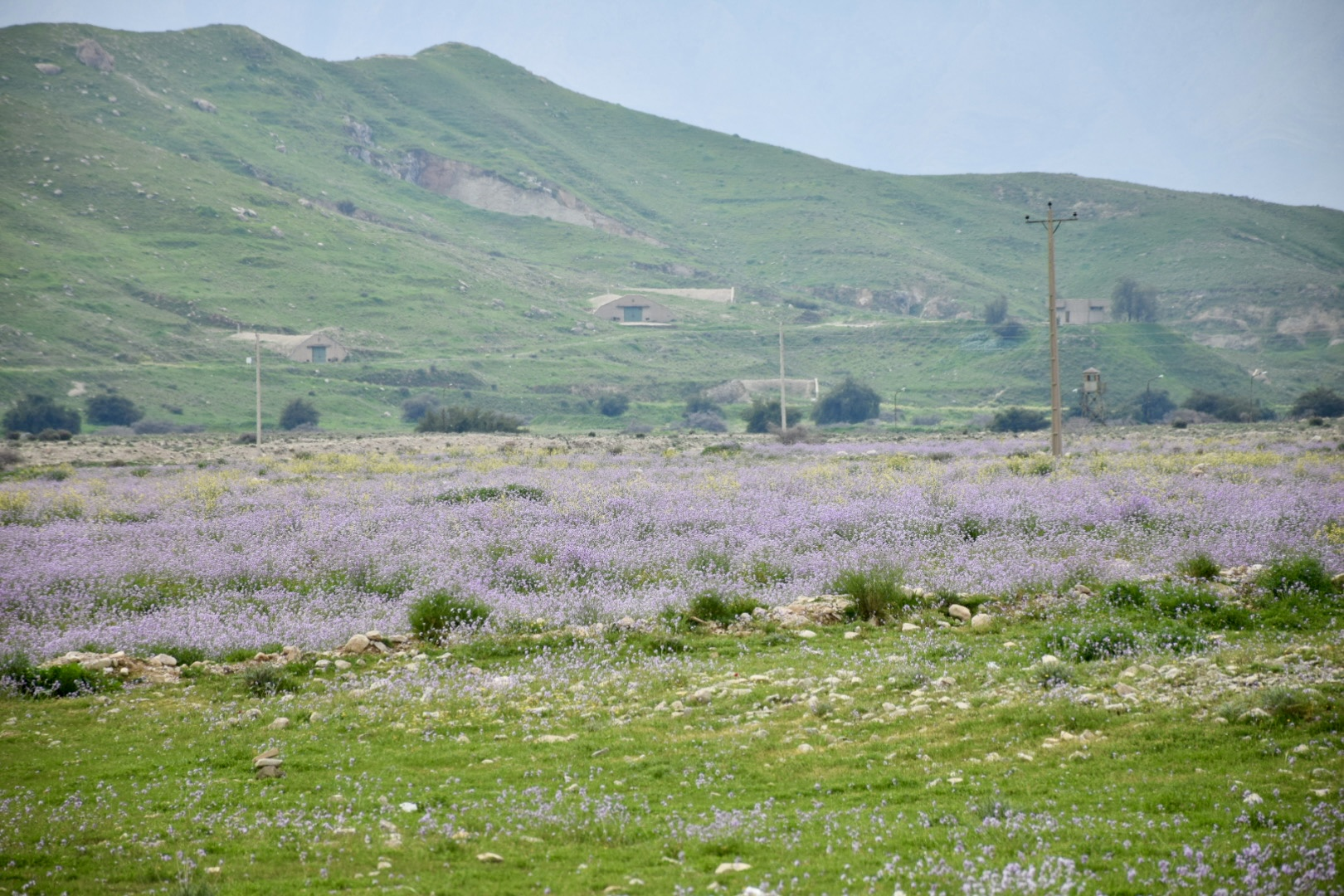
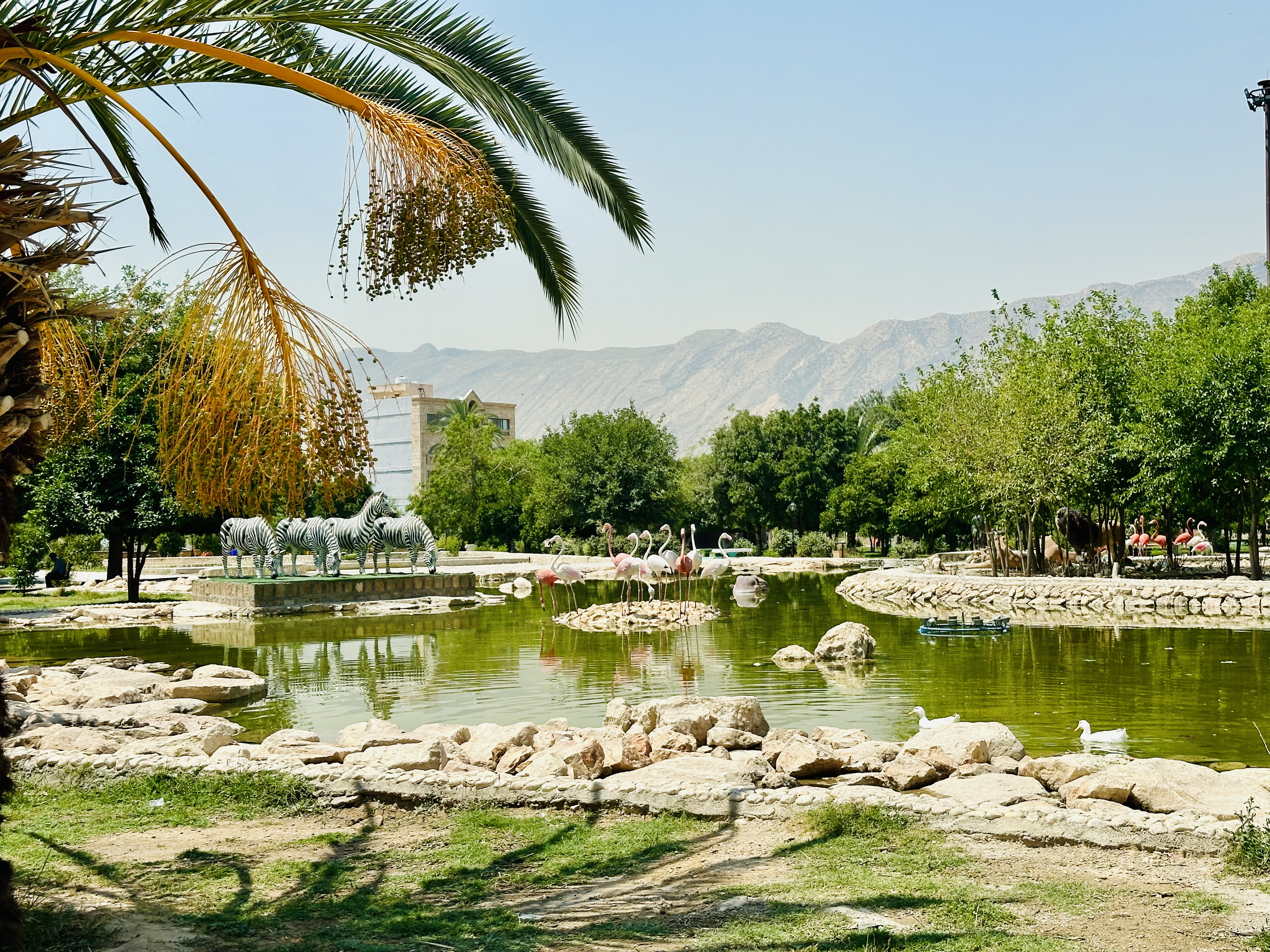
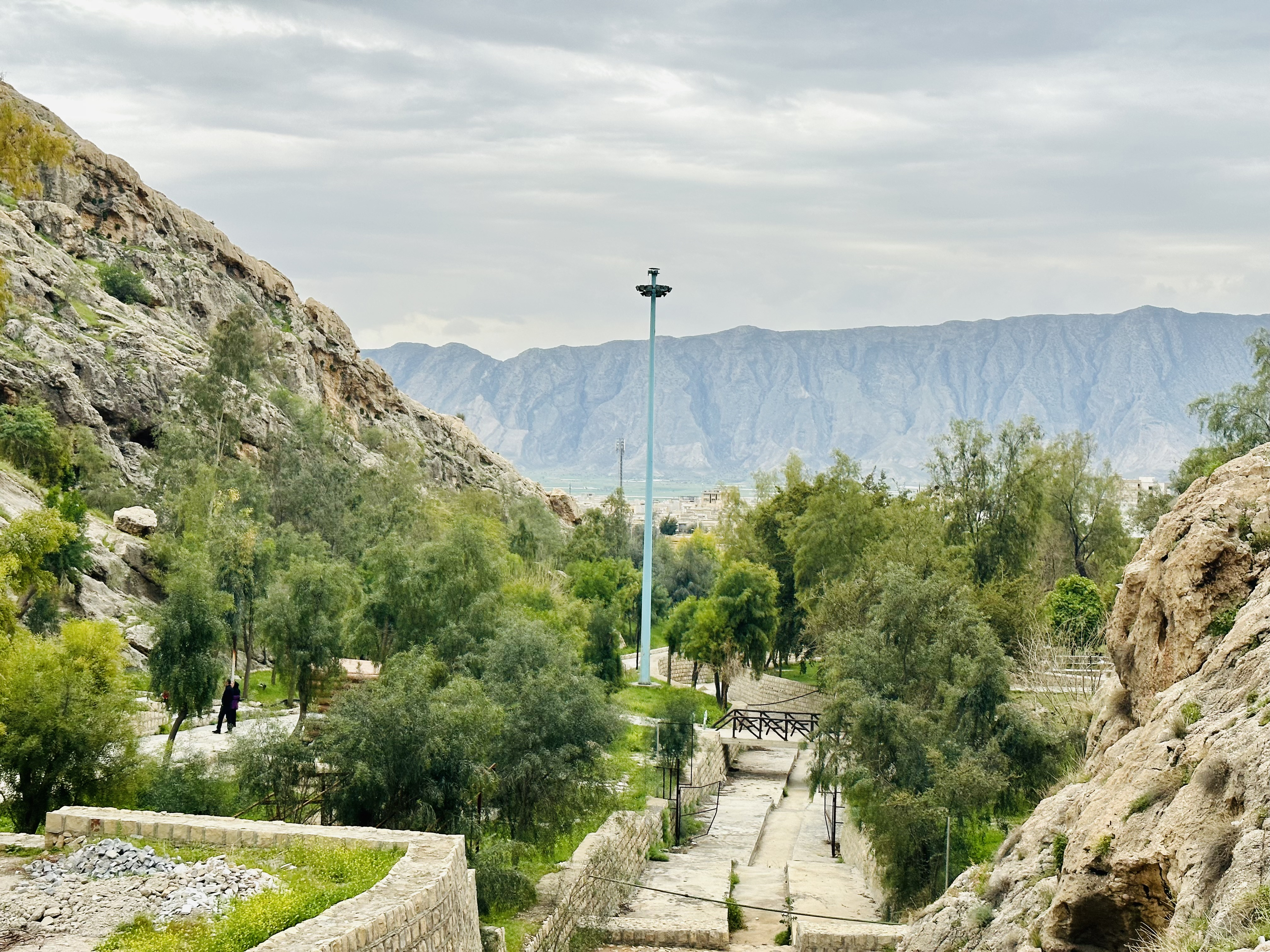
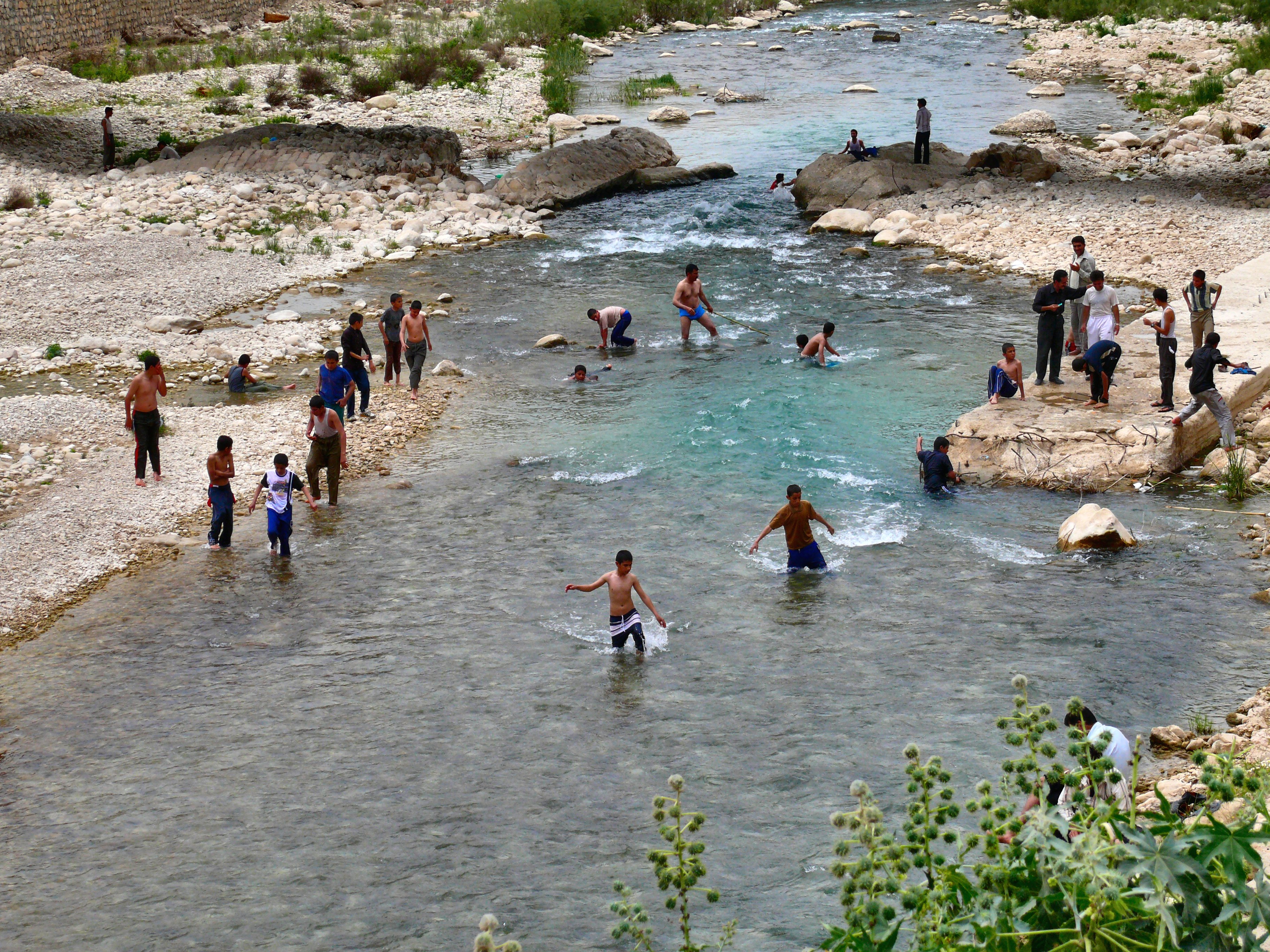
- View of the southwestern areas of Kazerun Colossal statue of Shapur I in Shapur cave Anahita Temple of Bishapur Inscription of Shapur I in Tang-e Chowgan Lake Parishan Dasht-e Barm Forest Nazar Garden Kazerun historical bazaar Tomb of Abu Ishaq of Kazerun Daffodil farms of Kazerun Tomb of Amin al-Din Balyani Tomb of Nasrollah Mardani The plain of purple flowers of Kazerun Rafi Garden Tang-e Tikab mountain park Shapur river
- Nicknames: Shahr-e Sabz (Green city), Shahr-e Kohneh (Old city), Damietta of Ajam
- Location in Iran Kazerun (West and Central Asia)
- Coordinates: 29°37′08″N 51°39′14″E
- Country: Iran
- Province: Fars
- County: Kazerun
- District: Central
- Historical Region: Shapur-Khwarrah
- Founded: 5500 B.C.
- Municipality of Kazerun: 1918
- Founder: Tahmuras (Mythic fiction), Expansion by Shapur I and Kavad I

Government
  - Type: Governorate, Mayor & City Council
  - Mayor: Hamid Hashemi
  - City Council: Alireza Afsharian (Chairman)
  - Governor of County: Zeinolabedin Nik-Maram
  - Parliament: Gholamreza Dehghan Naserabadi

Area
  - Urban: 20.4 km^{2} (7.9 sq mi)
- Elevation: 843 m (2,766 ft)

Population (2016 Census)
  - Urban: 96,683
- Demonym(s): Kazeruni, Kazerooni or Kazerouni
- Time zone: UTC+3:30 (IRST)
- Postal code: 73111 - 73391
- Area code: 071
- Website: kazeroon.ir

Kazerun (Persian: کازرون) (Note: Also romanized as Kazeroon, Kāzeroūn, and Kāzerūn; also known as Kasrun) is a city in the northwest of Fars Province in Iran and the center of Kazerun County. This city has an ancient history, with numerous historical monuments and tourist attractions. Kazerun is the fifth most populous city in Fars Province.

The population of Kazerun city without suburbs in the 2016 general population and housing census was 96,683 people, and the population of Kazerun county was 211,341 people.

Before Islam, the city of Bishapur was one of the capitals of the Sasanian Empire and the center of the current region of Kazerun. When it was destroyed by the invading Arab Muslims, its Persian residents migrated to the city of Kazerun.

Persian mythology attributes the foundation of the city of Kazerun to the Pishdadian dynasty and Tahmuras, more than 7,500 years ago. Historical accounts also tell of the expansion of this city by Shapur I and Kavad I, two Sasanian kings.

The people of the Kazerun and Shapur regions once rebelled and declared their independence from the Rashidun Caliphate after the Arab conquest of the region. The rebellion, led by a Sassanid nobleman, was severely suppressed.

The ancient city of Bishapur, Tang-e Chowgan, and Shapur cave are among Iran's UNESCO World Heritage sites near Kazerun. In addition, the Arzhan and Parishan Protected Area near Kazerun has been registered as one of Iran's natural heritage sites on the UNESCO World Heritage List.

The people of Kazerun remained followers of the Zoroastrianism religion until the 10th century. However, after the founding of the Kazeruniyeh (Morshediyeh) sufism by Abu Ishaq of Kazerun, the majority of the people of the city converted to Islam.

The Kazeruniyeh sufism, centered in the city of Kazerun, spread to countries such as India, China, and the Ottoman Empire in the following centuries, bringing fame to the city and economic prosperity.

This city was the birthplace of many Persian scientists, poets, Sufis, merchants, and other great Persian figures, and it is remembered as one of the centers of Persian civilization, culture, and knowledge.

The language of the people of Kazerun is Persian with Kazeruni dialect.

The economy of Kazerun is based on trade, transportation, service occupations, agriculture, and industry.

== History ==
The history of the origin of Kazerun, like other ancient cities of Iran, is in obscure and sometimes it is mixed with myths. However, sources such as Fars-Nama attribute the foundation of Kazerun to the Pishdadian dynasty.

=== Prehistory ===
Images

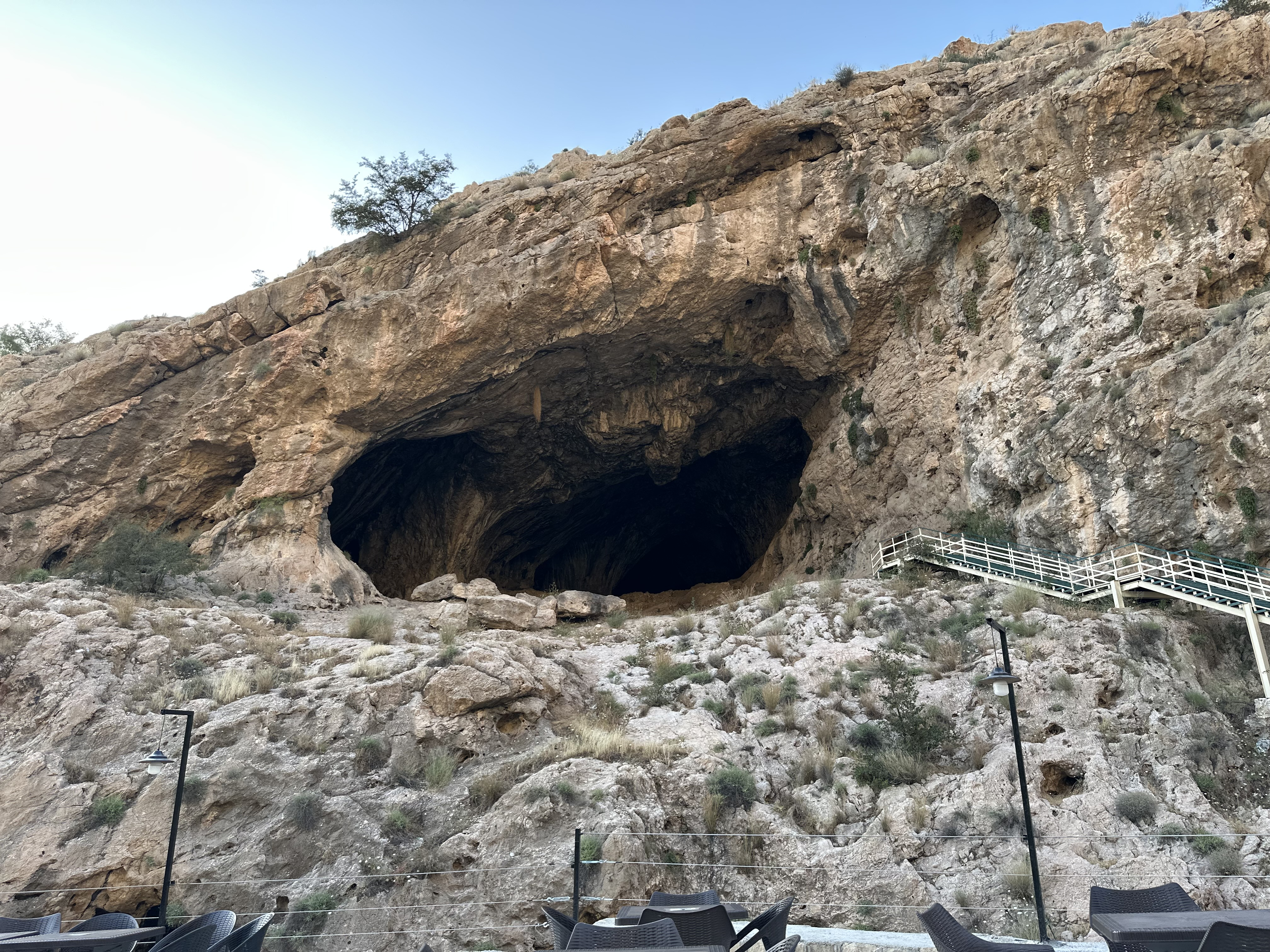
Tikab Rock cave shelters

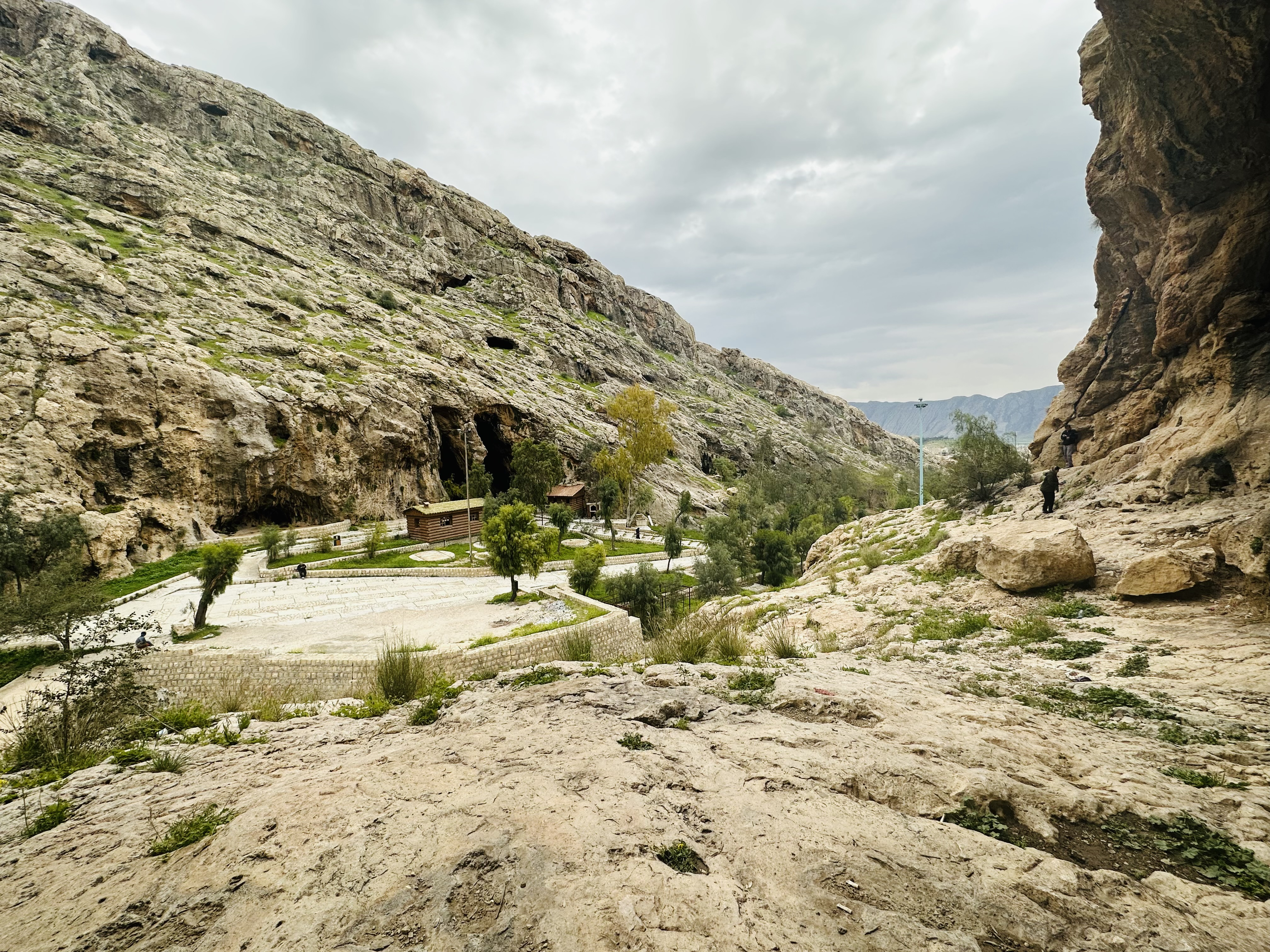
Tikab caves in Kazerun

The first signs of habitation in the city known today as Kazerun were found in the caves known as Tikab in the northern mountain of Kazerun. These caves were inhabited by the Human evolution around 20,000 years ago.

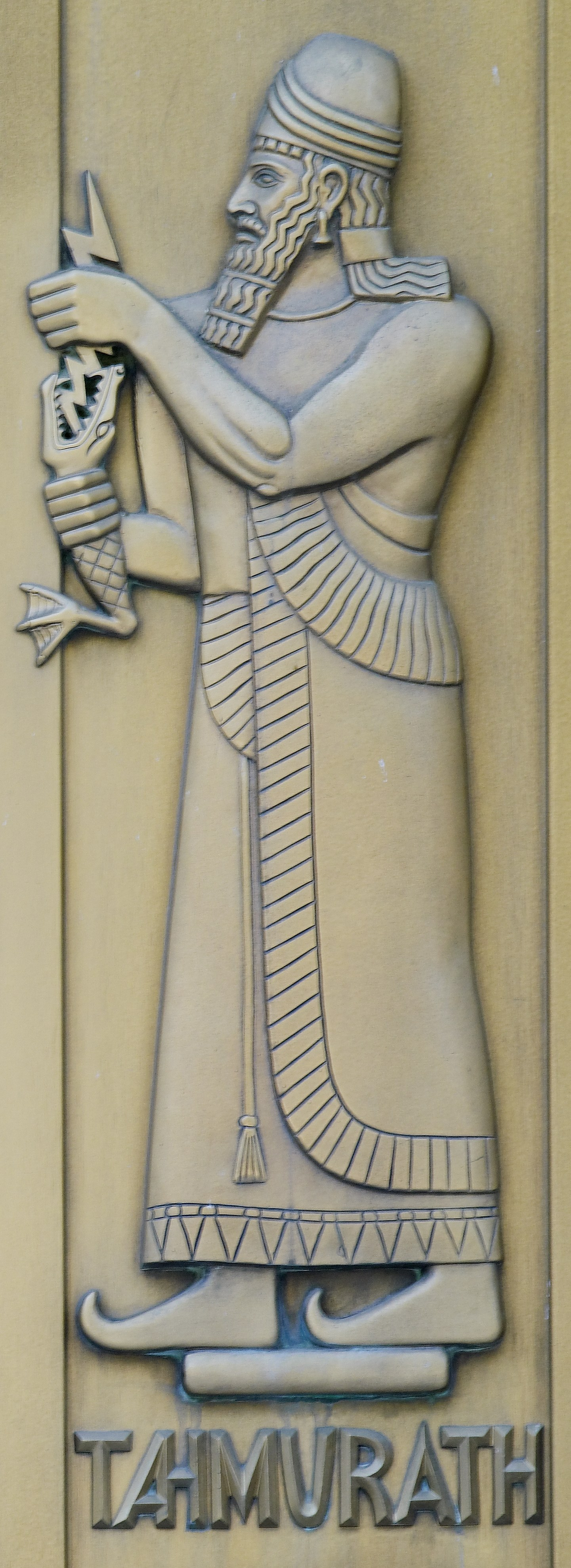
Tahmuras relief at the National Library of America - Washington, DC

=== Pishdadian dynasty ===
Pishdadian dynasty were the first rulers of Iran land in myths. In Fars-Nama, Ibn Balkhi considers Tahmuras, the Pishdadi king, to be the founder of the city of Kazerun.

=== Historical period before Islam ===
==== Achaemenid Empire ====
Although there is not much information about the status of Kazerun during the Achaemenid Empire, but according to some writings, Kazerun was a small and sparsely populated area of the ancient city of Dindella (Persian: دین‌دلا), which was destroyed in the attack of Alexander the Great on Iran. In the following centuries, a city named Bishapur was built on the site of this ancient city.

==== Sasanian Empire ====
Images

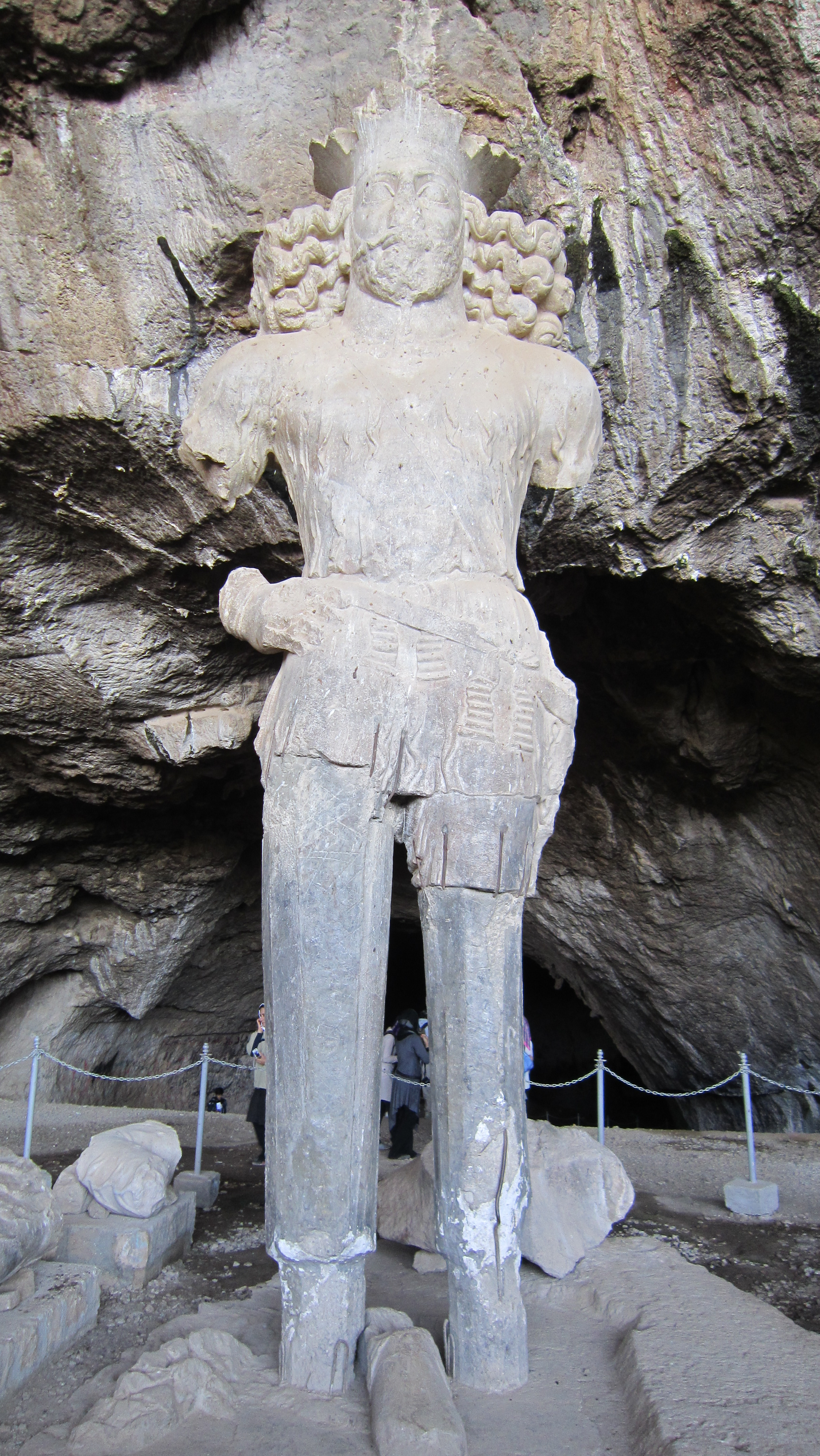
Statue of Shapur I in Shapur cave in Kazerun

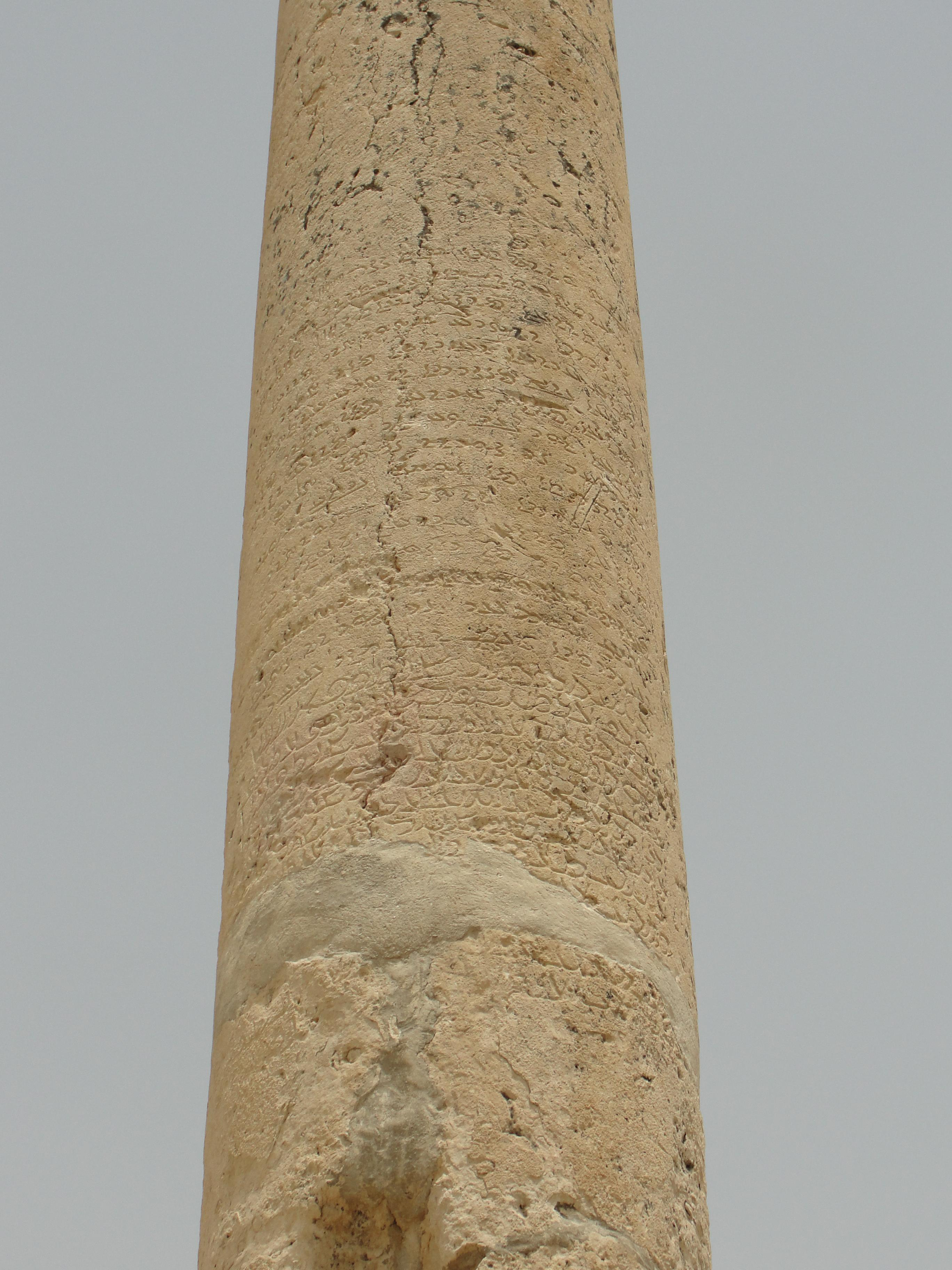
Inscription of Apasā, in which the order to build the city of Bishapur is mentioned

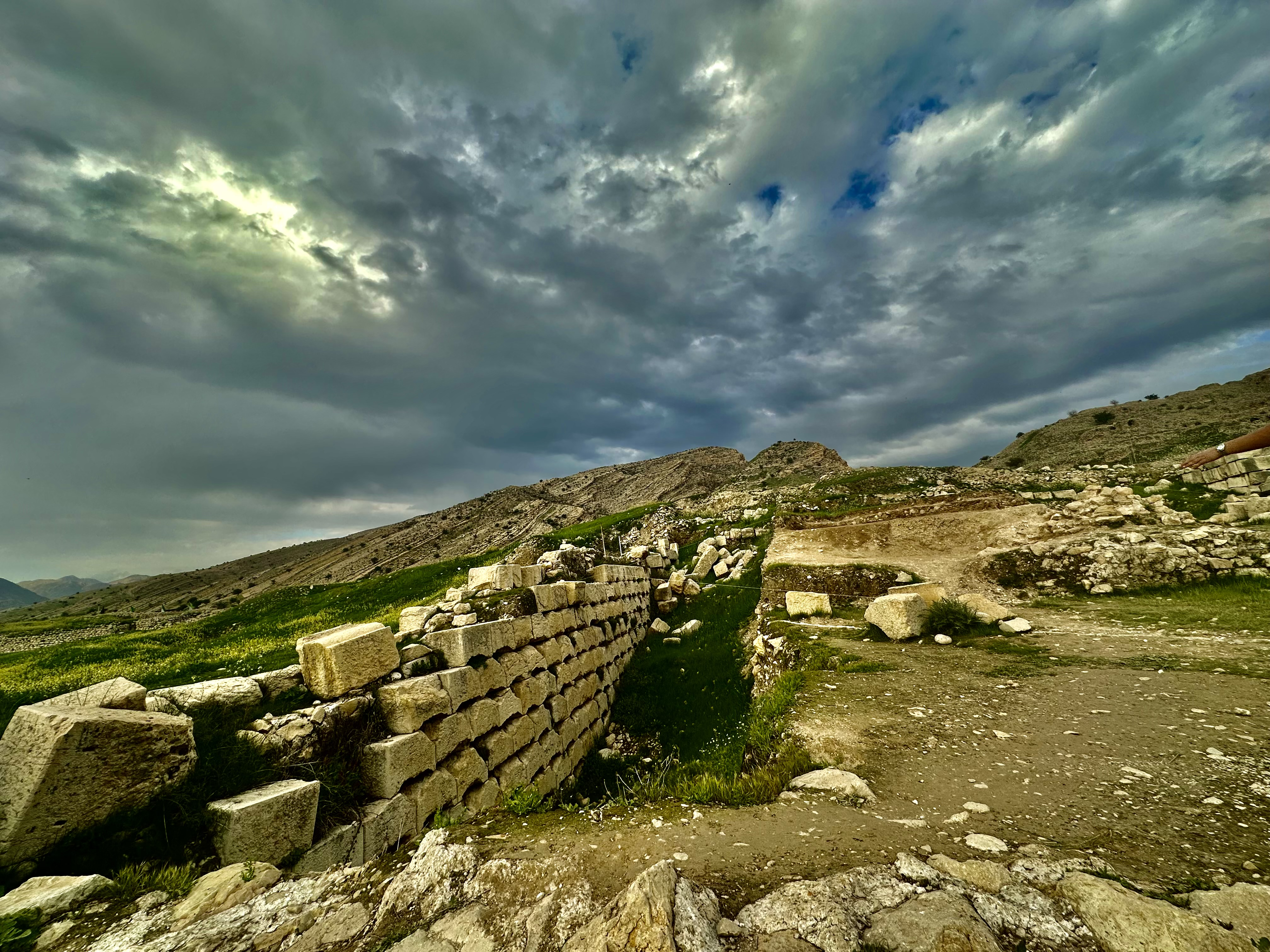
Remains of Valerian's Palace in Bishapur, the residence of Roman Emperor Valerian after his captivity

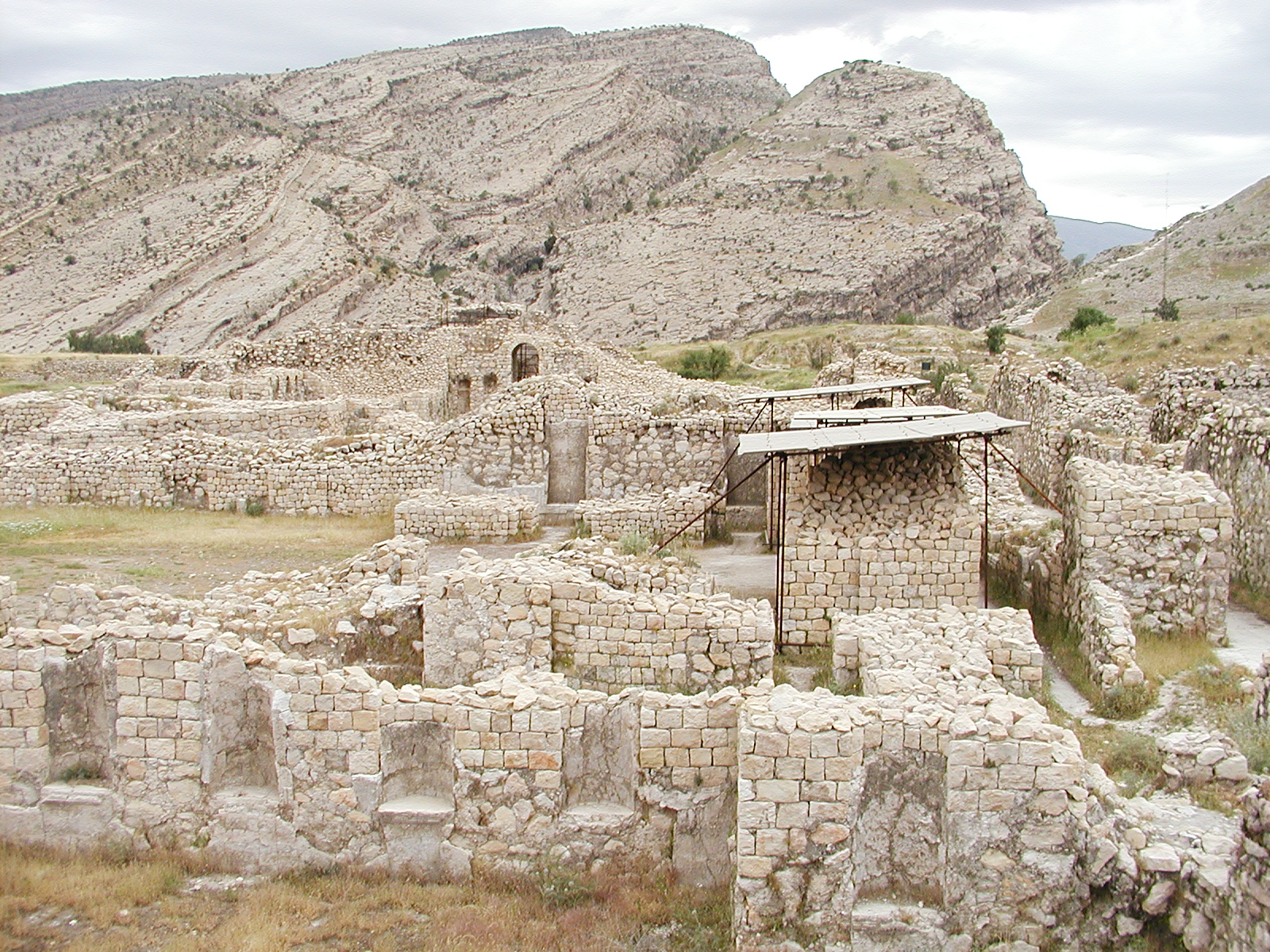
Remains of the ancient city of Bishapur

The period of the Sasanian Empire marked the peak of prosperity of the Kazerun region. After defeating the Roman Empire in the Battle of Edessa, Shapur I, king of the Sasanian Empire, ordered the construction of a city called Bishapur in 266 AD. The city of Bishapur was built according to the Roman city-building method (Hippodamus) by Roman prisoners.

At that time, two cities named Kazerun and Old City (romanized: Shahr-e Kohneh) were also located near Bishapur. Alongside the construction of Bishapur, Shapur I began to develop the city of Kazerun. Bishapur became one of the capitals of the Sasanian Empire and the center of the Shapur-Khwarrah, and Kazerun and the Old City were also considered its subsidiaries.

During this time, the city of Kazerun included three districts: Nowred, Raheban and Derist. The Old City was located in an area between today's Kazerun and Lake Parishan.

Images

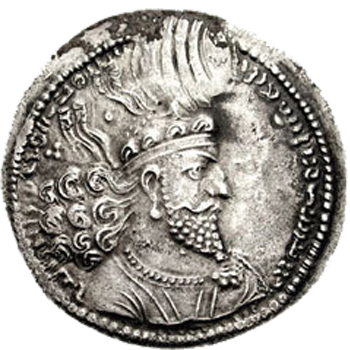
Hormizd I, third king of the Sasanian Empire, who was born in the city of Bishapur

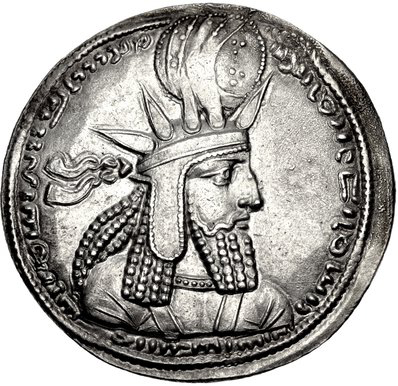
Bahram I, fourth king of the Sasanian emperor who was born in the city of Bishapur

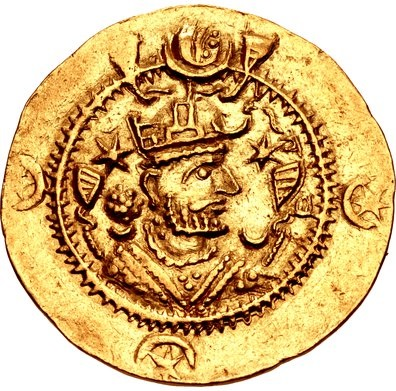
Kavad I, the 21st king of the Sasanian Empire, who worked for the prosperity of the city of Kazerun

In the 5th and 6th centuries AD, Kavad I expanded the city of Kazerun. Until the Arab conquest of Persia, Bishapur was a prosperous city with a population between 50,000 and 80,000 people.

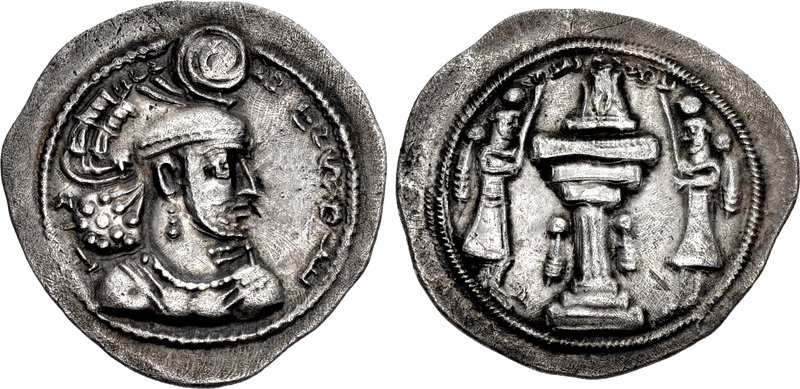
Silver coin with the image of Ardashir II, minted in Bishapur

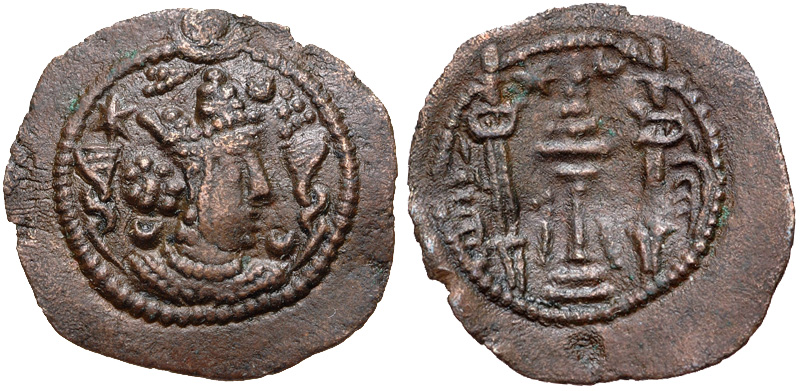
A coin with the image of Kavad I, minted in Bishapur

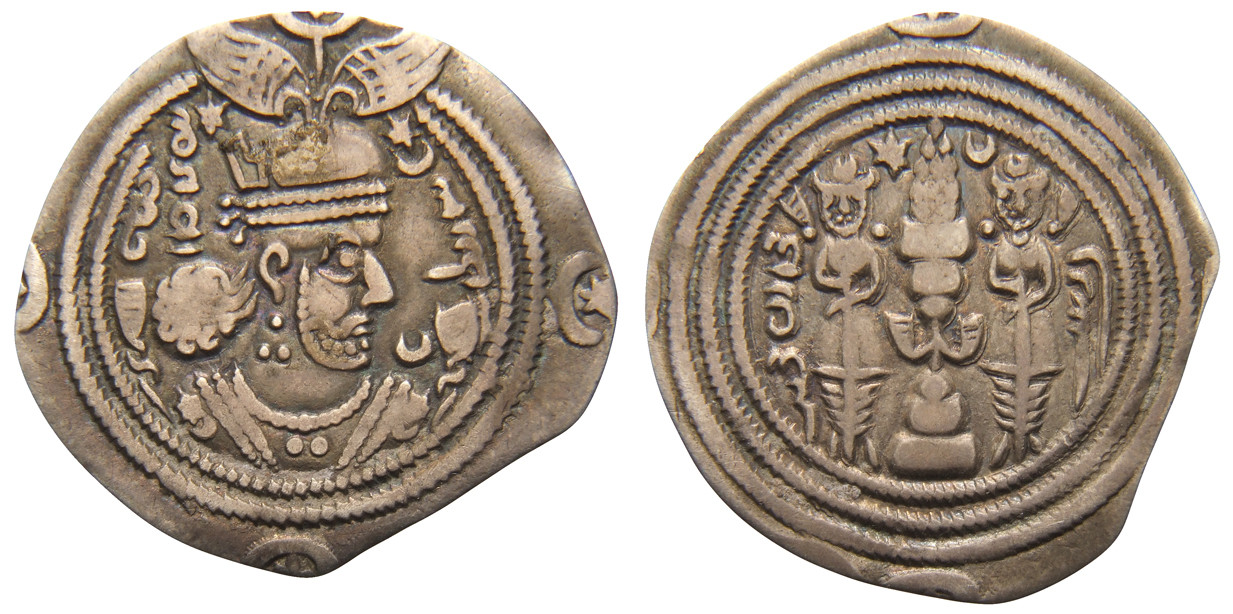
A coin with the image of Khosrow II, minted in Bishapur

=== Islamic era ===
==== Seventh to ninth century AD ====
Images

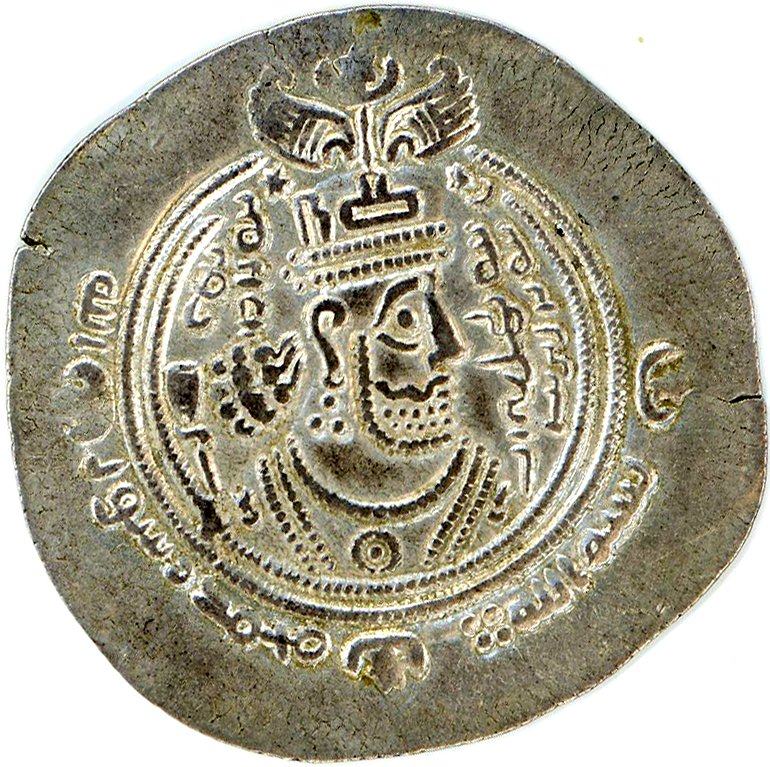
Silver Dirham, minted in Bishapur in the seventh century AD

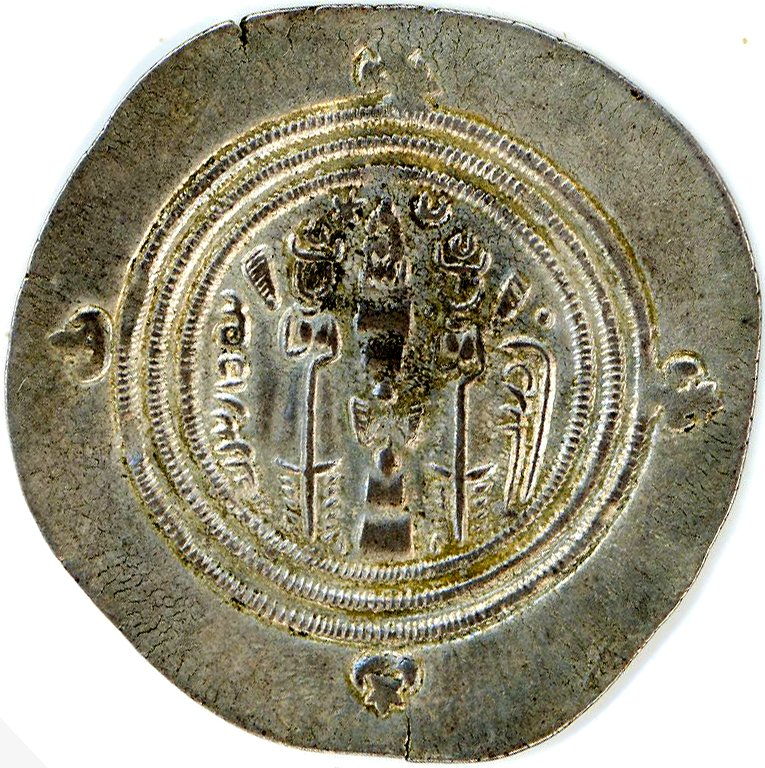
Silver Dirham, minted in Bishapur in the seventh century AD

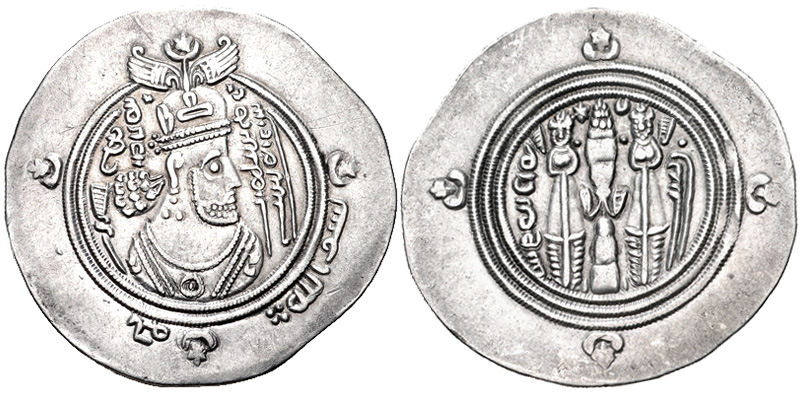
A coin with the image of Al-Muhallab ibn Abi Sufra, minted in Bishapur in the seventh century AD

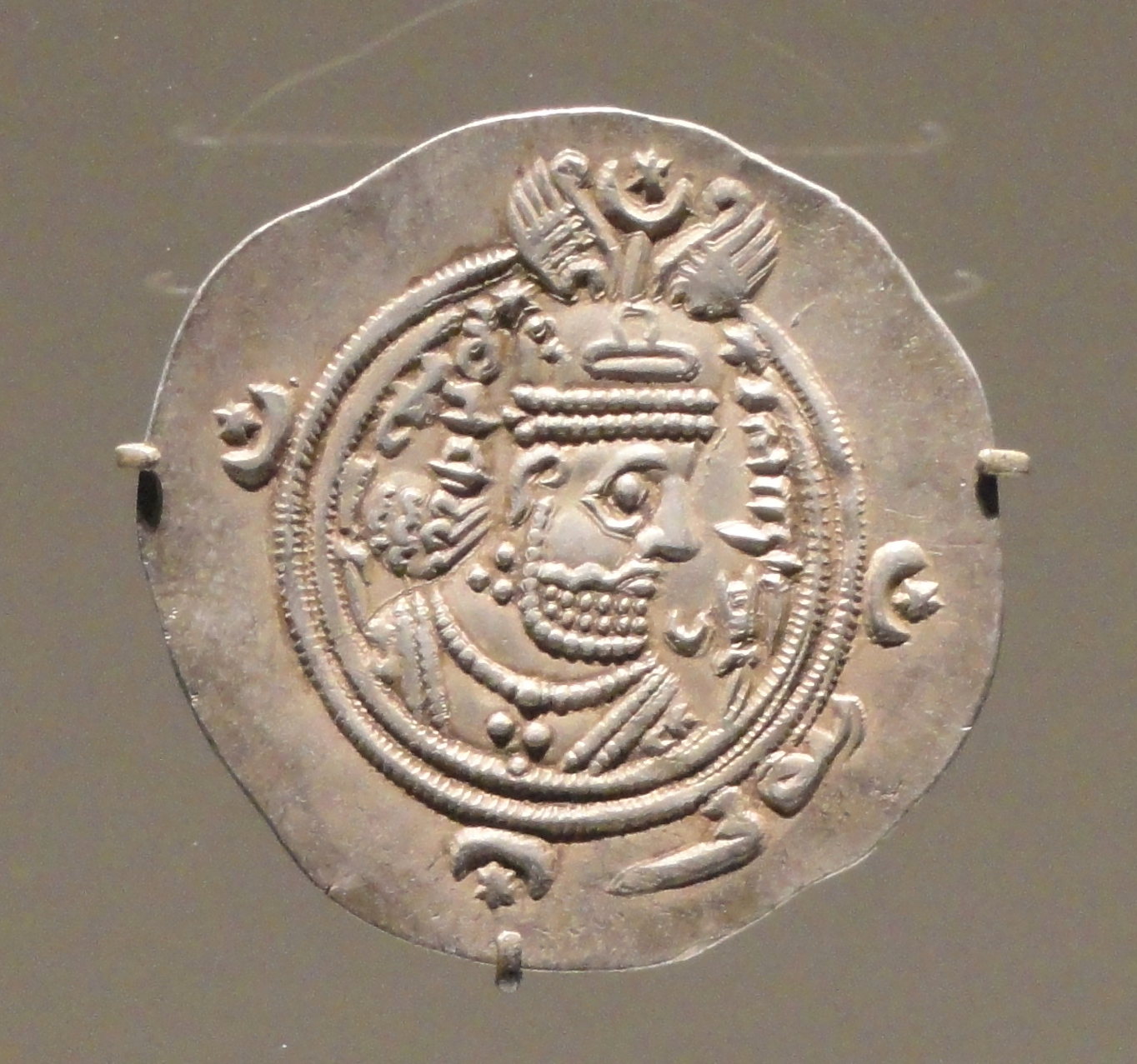
A coin with the image of Ubayd Allah ibn Ziyad, minted in Bishapur in the seventh century AD

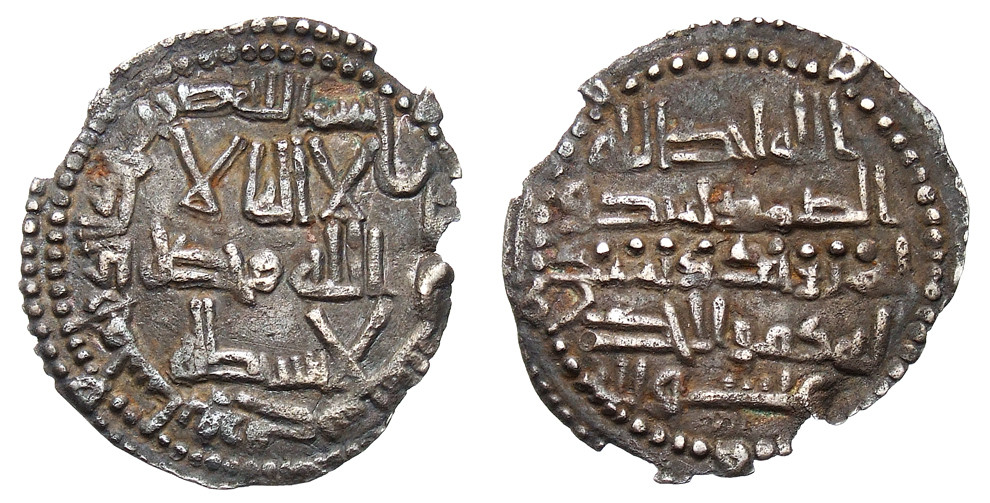
A coin from the era of al-Walid I, minted at Bishapur in the seventh century AD

During the Arab conquest of Persia in 638 AD, Umar assigned one of his commanders named Mojashe bin Masoud to conquer Shapur-Khwarrah. Despite the great resistance of the people of Shapur-Khwarrah, the Arabs conquered Bishapur.

In 639 AD, Uthman bin Abi al-As was commissioned by Mojashe bin Masoud to conquer Kazerun and captured the city. After that, the people of Kazerun and Bishapur continuously rebelled against the Arabs. In 643 AD and after the caliphate of Uthman, the people of Shapur-Khwarrah, under the command of Shahrag's brother, one of the Sassanid nobles, declared independence.

After the Great battle of Bishapur, Uthman bin Abi al-As finally conquered Bishapur, now Bandegan and Jereh again with peace and receiving the wealth and tribute.

The people of Shapur-Khwarrah broke their agreement again in 646 AD and Uthman conquered the city again with Abu Musa al-Ash'ari. The resistance of the people of Shapur-Khwarrah against the Arabs was so great that Abida, the Arab general, was seriously injured; when he was dying, he requested the Arab troops to massacre the people of this region for the sake of killing him.

In 687 AD, the people of Shapur-Khwarrah revolted against the Arabs once again, and this time they were suppressed by Umar bin Ubaidullah bin Muammar.

In 702 AD, during the rule of Al-Hajjaj ibn Yusuf, the displaced people of Shapur-Khwarrah defeated the Hajjaj army with the help of Ibn al-Ash'ath and captured the city of Kufa. However, with the arrival of reinforcements, the rebels were defeated and Shapur-Khwarrah was again under the control of the Army Umayyads.

Bishapur gradually lost its prosperity in the 8th and 9th centuries of AD, and with the migration of its residents to Kazerun and its surroundings, it transferred its prosperity to this city.

==== Tenth century AD ====
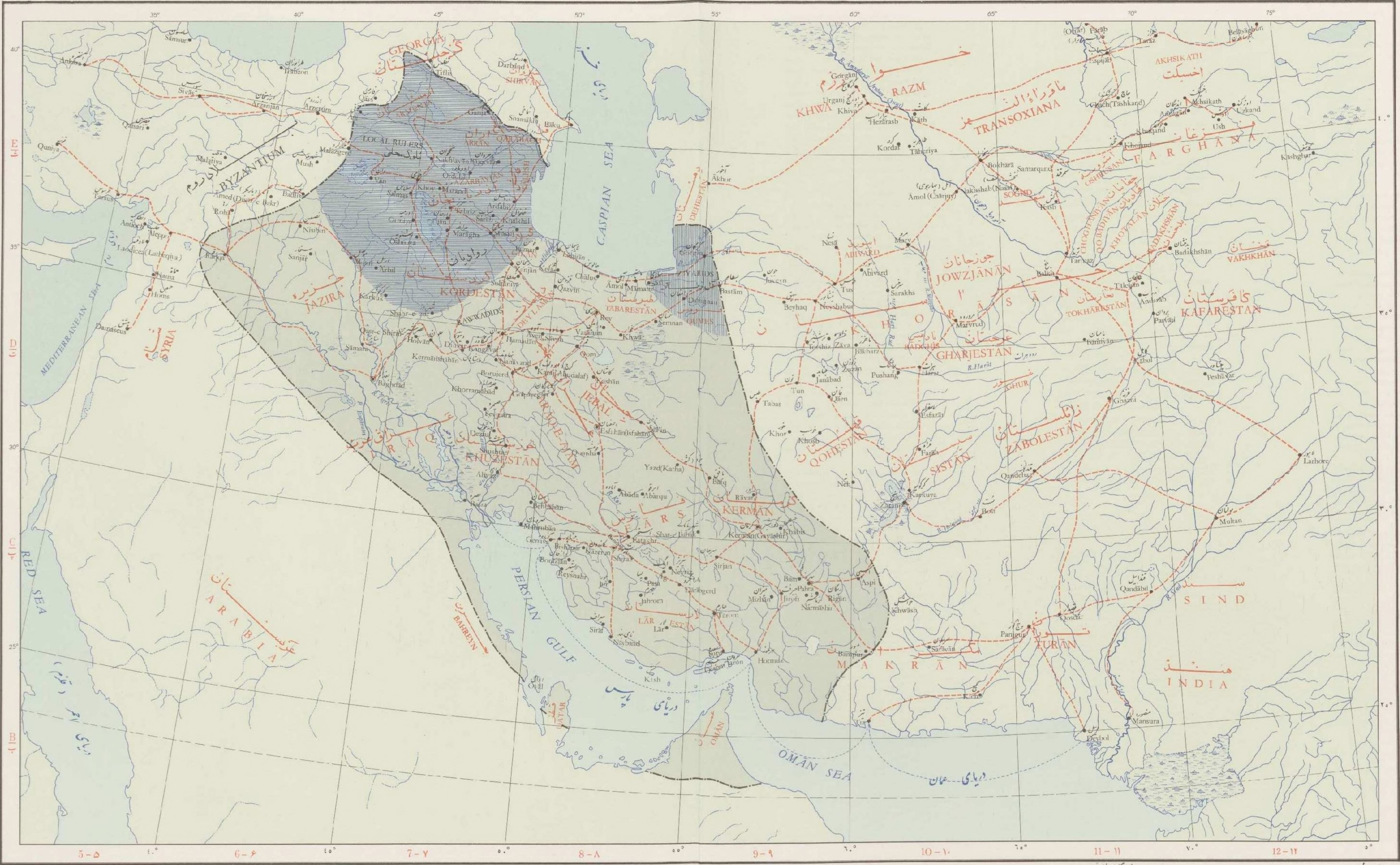
Map of Iran during the time of Buyid dynasty

In 933 AD, Imad al-Dawla, the founder of the Buyid dynasty, sent his brother Rukn al-Dawla to this region to capture Kazerun and Bishapur. Rukn al-Dawla defeated Yaqut, the governor of Kazerun, and captured the region. Buyid dynasty's rule in the 10th century AD was associated with religious tolerance. In the second half of the 10th century AD, Kazerun was considered one of the largest Zoroastrian cities in Iran.

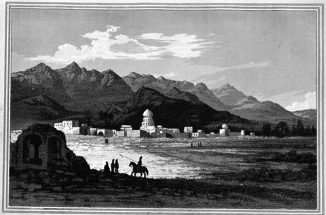
The remains of a fire temple in Kazerun, while a view of a mosque is also visible in the background (painting by Lt. Johnson in 1818)

The ruler of the city was a Zoroastrian named Khorshīd Marzbān.

After 'Adud al-Dawla came to power, the king paid special attention to Kazerun, the main reason for which was its location near the Persian Gulf and Siraf Port.

Buyid dynasty rulers tried to revive the ancient city of Bishapur while Kazerun flourished, and they were able to restore prosperity to this city to some extent after several centuries. The coins minted in Bishapur in this period confirm this.

Kazerun was considered one of the important centers of textile production during the time of Buyid dynasty, and for this reason, it was known as Damietta of Ajam (Persia).

During this period, Abu Ishaq of Kazerun, a famous Sufi, founded the Kazeruniyeh Sufism in this city and started spreading Islam and fighting against Zoroastrians. His actions caused the majority of the Zoroastrians of Kazarun to convert to Islam.

At the end of the 10th century AD, there was a large migration from the Old City (to the east of Kazerun, Balad al-Atigh in Arabic) to Kazerun. Along with the migration of the people of Bishapur, Kazerun became the center of the population concentration.

==== Eleventh and twelfth centuries AD ====
After the establishment of the Kazeruniyeh Sufism by Abu Ishaq of Kazerun, the city of Kazerun became a religious hub, firmly establishing the position of Kazerun as the center of the Shapur region.

After the Seljuk Empire came to power with Alp Arslan as its sultan, Fadluya, the head of the Shabankara clan, killed Abu Mansur Fulad Sutun, the Amir of Buyid dynasty, and became the ruler of the Fars region. For many years, the Shabankara family ruled over the region.

In 1078 AD, Mahmud I came to power and made his cousin, Turan Shah I, the governor of Fars.

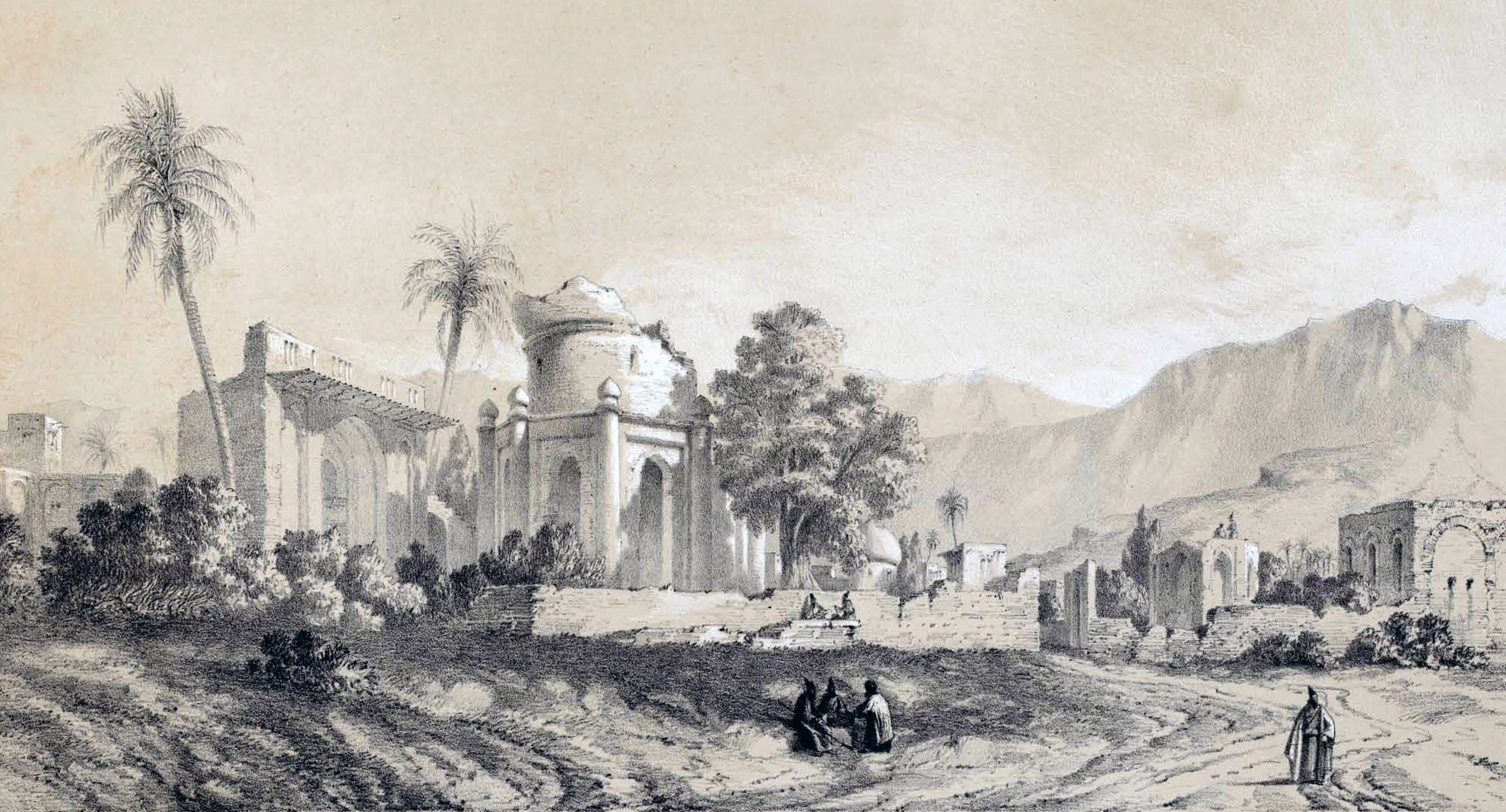
A sketch of the remains of the city of Bishapur during the time of Mohammad Shah Qajar, by Eugène Flandin in the Iran Travel literature (Voyage en Perse)

Turan Shah also entrusted Kazerun and Shapur to the elders of Shabankara clan. But the people of the Shabankara tribe were constantly killing and looting in Fars, especially in Kazerun and Shapur. In one case, Abu Saeed Shabankara set fire to the city of Bishapur in 1101 AD.

After Muhammad I Tapar came to power, in 1108 AD, he chose Jalaluddin Chawoli as Atabeg of Fars and thus ended the rule of Shabankara clan in Fars. Chawoli arrested and killed Abu Saeed Shabankara. He also revitalized the city of Kazerun.

==== Thirteenth to sixteenth centuries AD ====
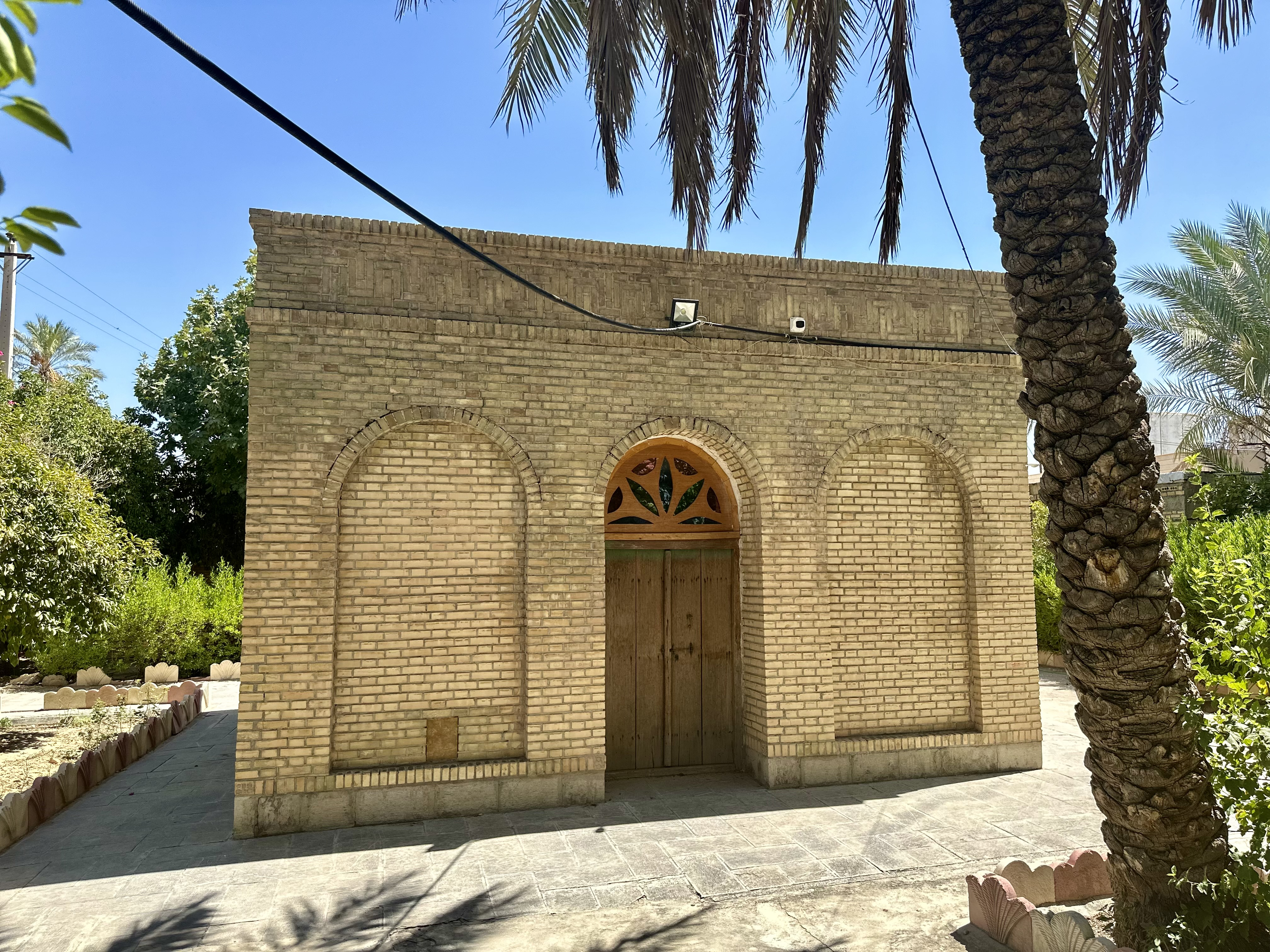
Tomb of Abu Ishaq of Kazerun

The 13th to 16th century AD marked another peak period of prosperity and fame for the city of Kazerun. This was due to the expansion of the Kazeruniyeh Sufism and its Sufi lodges in Iran, India, China, and the Ottoman Empire, and was influenced by the religious appeal of Abu Ishaq of Kazerun.

Beginning in the 10th century, a large network of merchants from Kazerun traveled all over Iran, as well as India, China, and the Ottoman Empire. Along with trading goods, they were representatives of the central Sufi lodge in Kazerun and promoted this form Sufism. Hasan Fasa'i narrates about this in his book Fars-Nama-ye Naseri:

The number of merchants of Kazerun is so large that this book (Fars-Nama) cannot contain it.

The influence of the Kazeruniyeh Sufism during the 10th century AD reached such an extent that kings of Iran and emperors of India and the Ottoman became disciples of the Kazeruniyeh Sufism. They made their offerings to the central Sufi lodge in Kazerun, and it created world fame for the city.

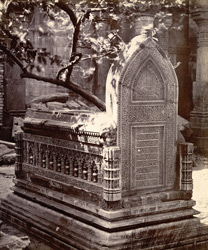
Tomb of Umar Kazeruni, one of the Sufis of the Kazeruniyeh Sufism, which was built for him by Muhammad bin Tughluq, the Sultan of Delhi in the 14th century AD

Among the kings of Iran who were followers of the Kazeruniyeh Sufism are Shahrukh, who used to visit the tomb of Abu Ishaq of Kazerun during his trip to the south of Iran. Among the kings of India who were disciples of the Kazeruniyeh Sufism are Balban, Alauddin Khalji and Muhammad bin Tughluq.

The two Ottoman emperors, Bayezid the Thunderbolt and Mehmed the Conqueror, were also devotees of the Kazeruniyeh Sufism and built buildings in the name of this Sufism in Ottoman. Ibn Battuta, a Moroccan traveler who also traveled to Kazerun and visited the tomb of Abu Ishaq of Kazerun, in this regard, writes in the book Rihla:

Sheykh Abu Ishaq has great dignity and respect among the people of India and China. People who travel in the China Sea, when there is a storm or insecurity, they make vows in the name of the sheykh, and when the ship reaches the shore safely, Servants of Sufi lodges gets on the ship and takes control of the ship. Everyone pays the vows that he has made in his heart to Servants of Sufi lodges, and no ship comes from India or China, unless he has brought thousands of dinars of these vows with him, and all these amounts are collected by envoys appointed by Sufi lodges of Kazeruniyeh sufism.

The fame and prestige of the Kazeruniyeh Sufism continued until the 16th century AD.

One of the most important events of Kazerun in the 13th century AD is the Mongol attack on Kazerun in 1263.

Seljuq Shah bin Salghor, the Atabeg of Fars who had revolted against the Mongols, took refuge in the tomb of Abu Ishaq in Kazerun, and the people of Kazerun, who hated the Mongols, welcomed him and made the tomb of Abu Ishaq a bastion against the Mongols. In this battle, Seljuq Shah was captured and killed, and the people of Kazerun, who sheltered him, were massacred by the Mongols. In the 10th century AD, the Balyaniyeh Sufism was also founded by the famous Sufi of that time, Sheykh Abdollah Balyani in Kazerun.

==== Safavid dynasty ====
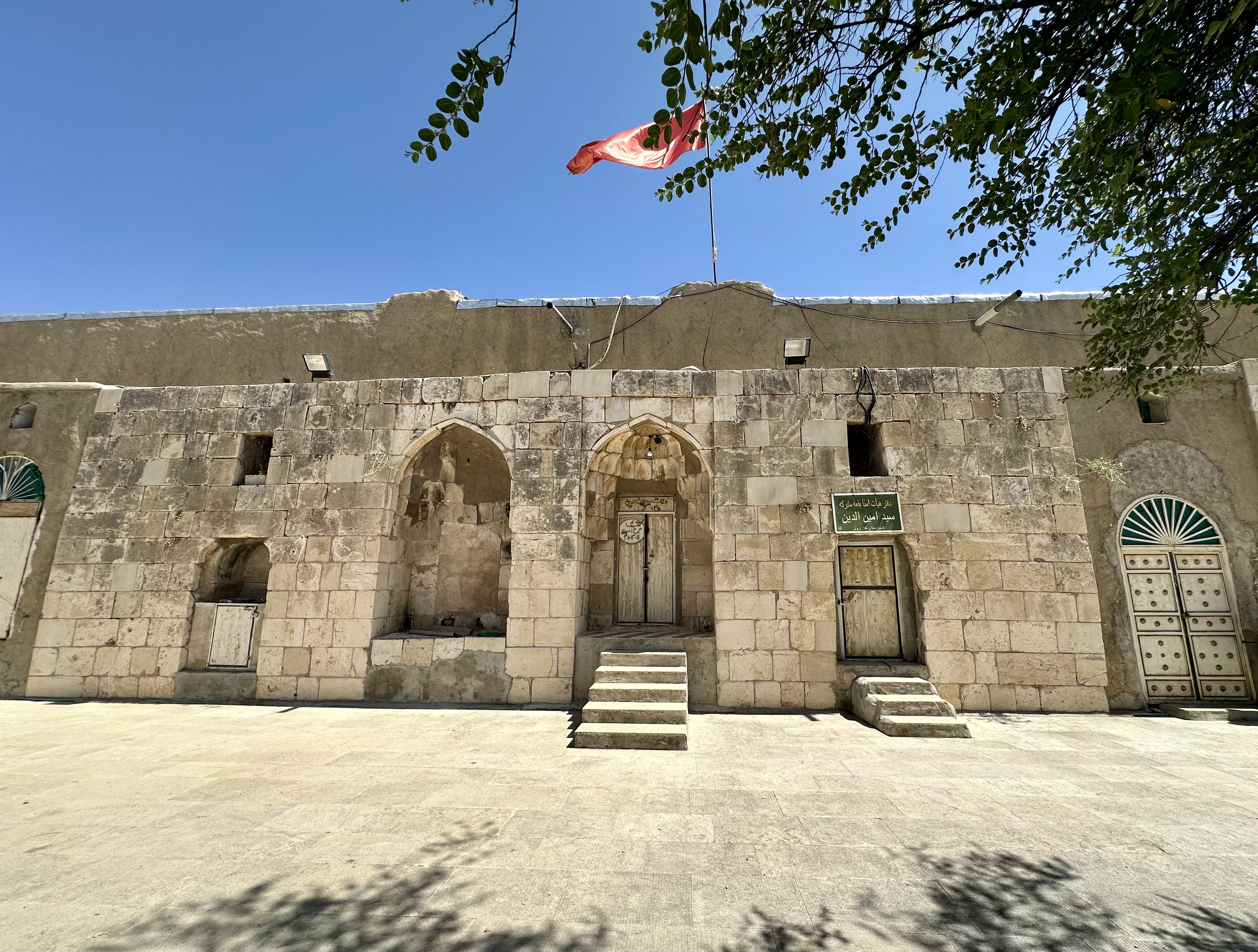
The tomb of Sheykh Amin al-Din Balyani, a famous Sufi in Kazerun, is one of the places that King Ismail I wanted to destroy, but stopped short of doing so.

When Shah Ismail I of Safavid dynasty came to power, he saw the Kazeruniyeh Sufism as his rival and enemy, and ordered the killing of the elders of this Sufism and destroyed their buildings in Iran. He personally marched to Kazerun and in addition to killing many Sufi elders in this city, he also destroyed their prominent buildings.

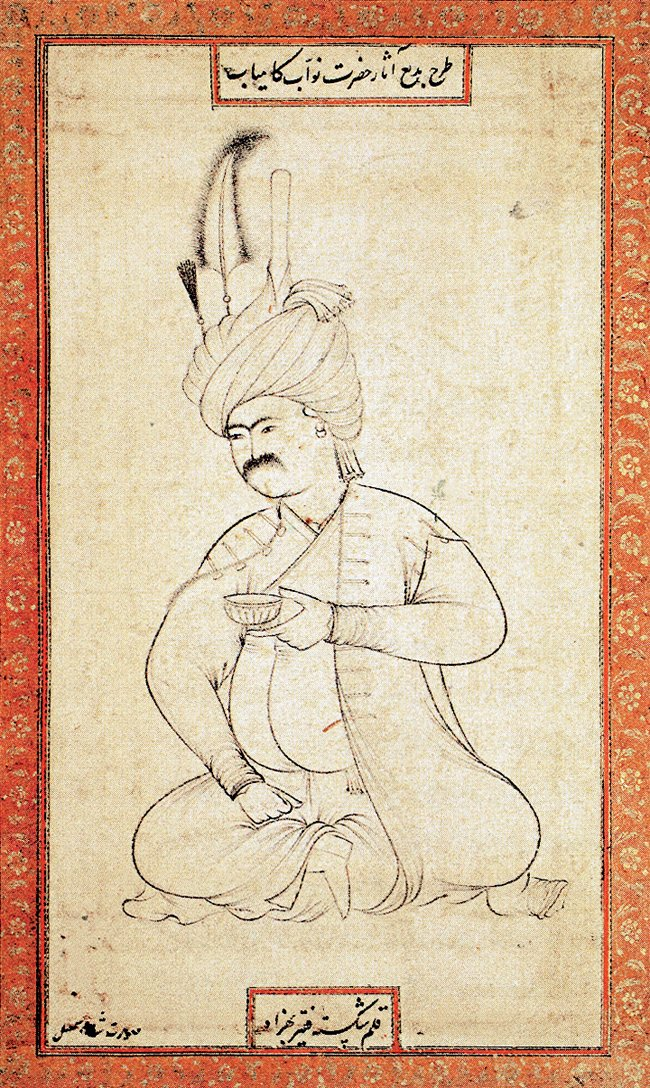
Shah Ismail Safavi after attacking Kazerun killed many great Sufis of this city. He then appoints Afshar's family to govern Kazerun.

During this period, King Ismail I appointed a family of elders from the Afshar people to rule Kazerun. The first person from this family who became the ruler of Kazerun was Khajeh Pir Badagh Afshar. After him, his children, Khajeh Pir Vali Afshar and Khajeh Hassan Ali Afshar, and then Khajeh Hossein Ali Afshar, became the rulers of Kazerun. The last ruler of Kazerun during the Safavid era was a person named Khajeh Hessamuddin Afshar. Despite the decline in prosperity due to the destruction of the Kazeruniyeh Sufism, Kazerun still maintained its prosperity to a large extent and was considered one of the centers of minting coins during the Safavid era.

==== Afsharid dynasty ====
Images

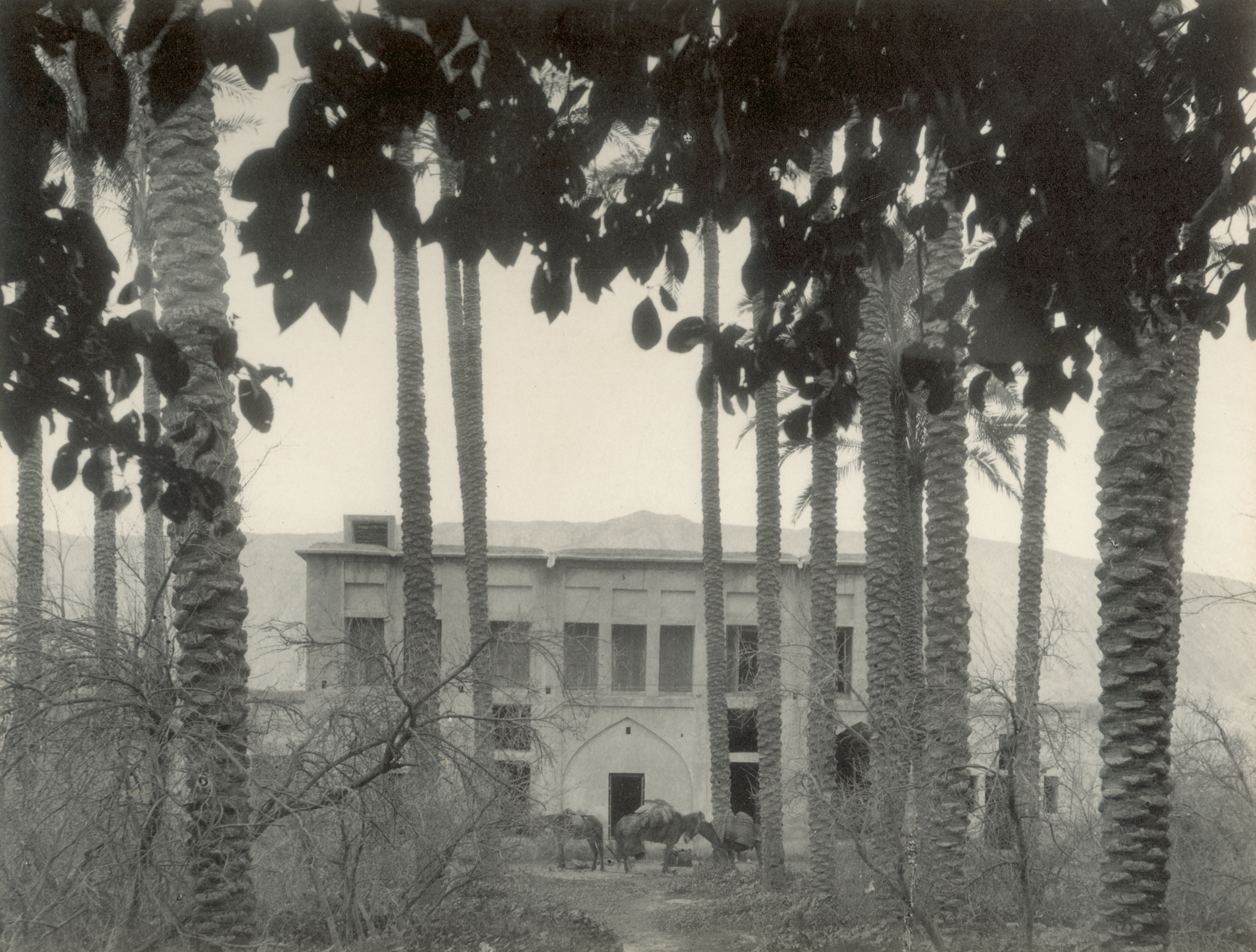
Nazar Historical Garden was built in 1117 AD by Khajeh Ali Qoli Khan Afshar in Kazerun

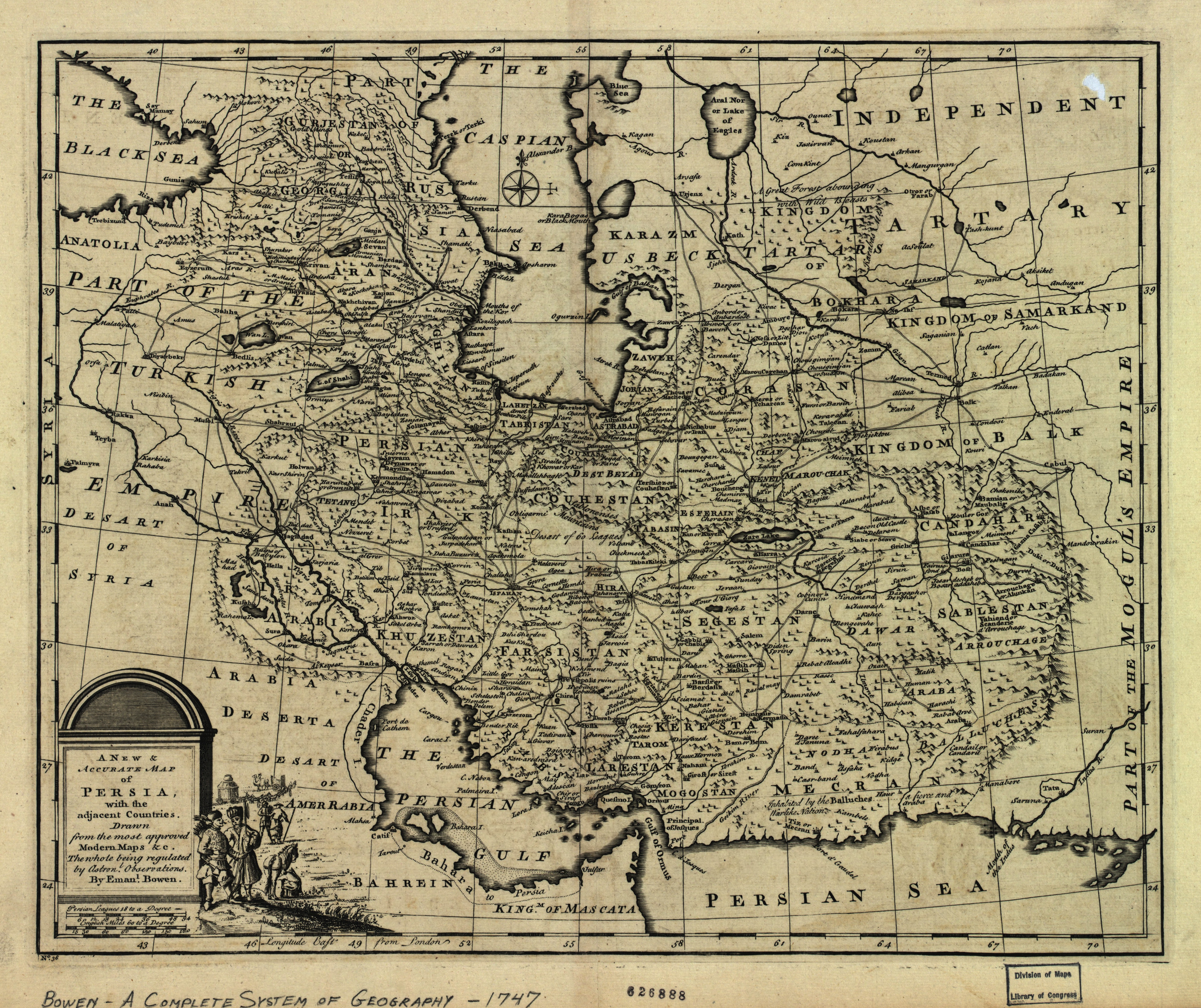
Map of Iran in Afsharid era. The city of Kazerun is marked in the southwest of the map.

After Nader Shah Afshar came to power, the rule of Afshar family continued in Kazerun. At that time, Khajeh Hessamuddin Afshar remained the ruler of Kazerun, and after him, Khajeh Mohammad Reza Afshar became the ruler of Kazerun, until in 1146 AH, Nader Shah came to Kazerun in pursuit of Mohammad Khan Baloch during his rebellion against Nader Shah.

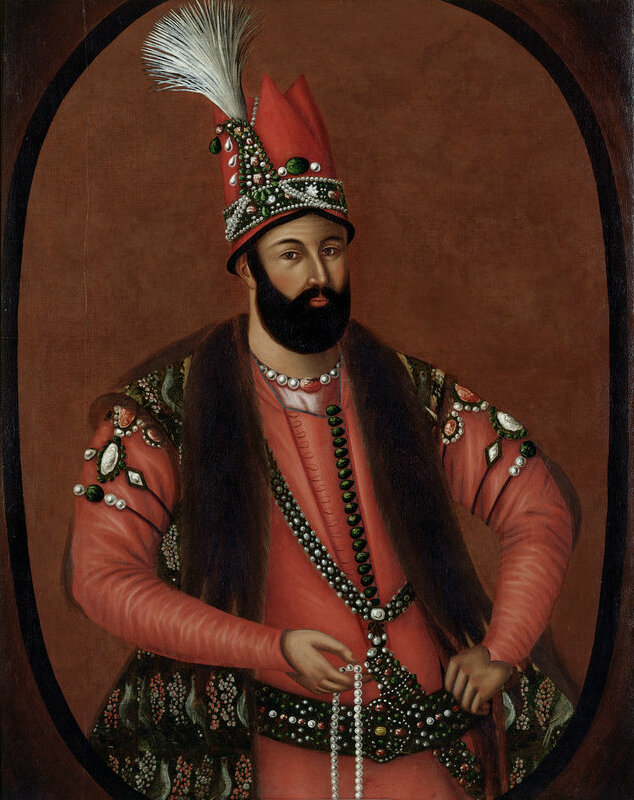
After killing the ruler of Kazerun, Nader Shah replaces him with his son

But Khajeh Mohammad Reza Afshar fought in support of Mohammad Khan Baloch against Nader Shah and was killed in this battle. After that, Nader Shah blinded Khajeh Mohammad Reza's nephew, Khajeh Abul Hasan Afshar. Nader Shah later regretted his act and to appease him, in 1733, he handed over the government of Kazerun to the son of Khajeh Mohammad Reza, Khajeh Ali Qoli Khan Afshar Kazeruni. Khajeh Ali Qoli Khan, in the position of governor of Kazerun, made many efforts in the direction of the development and settlement of this city.

==== Zand dynasty ====
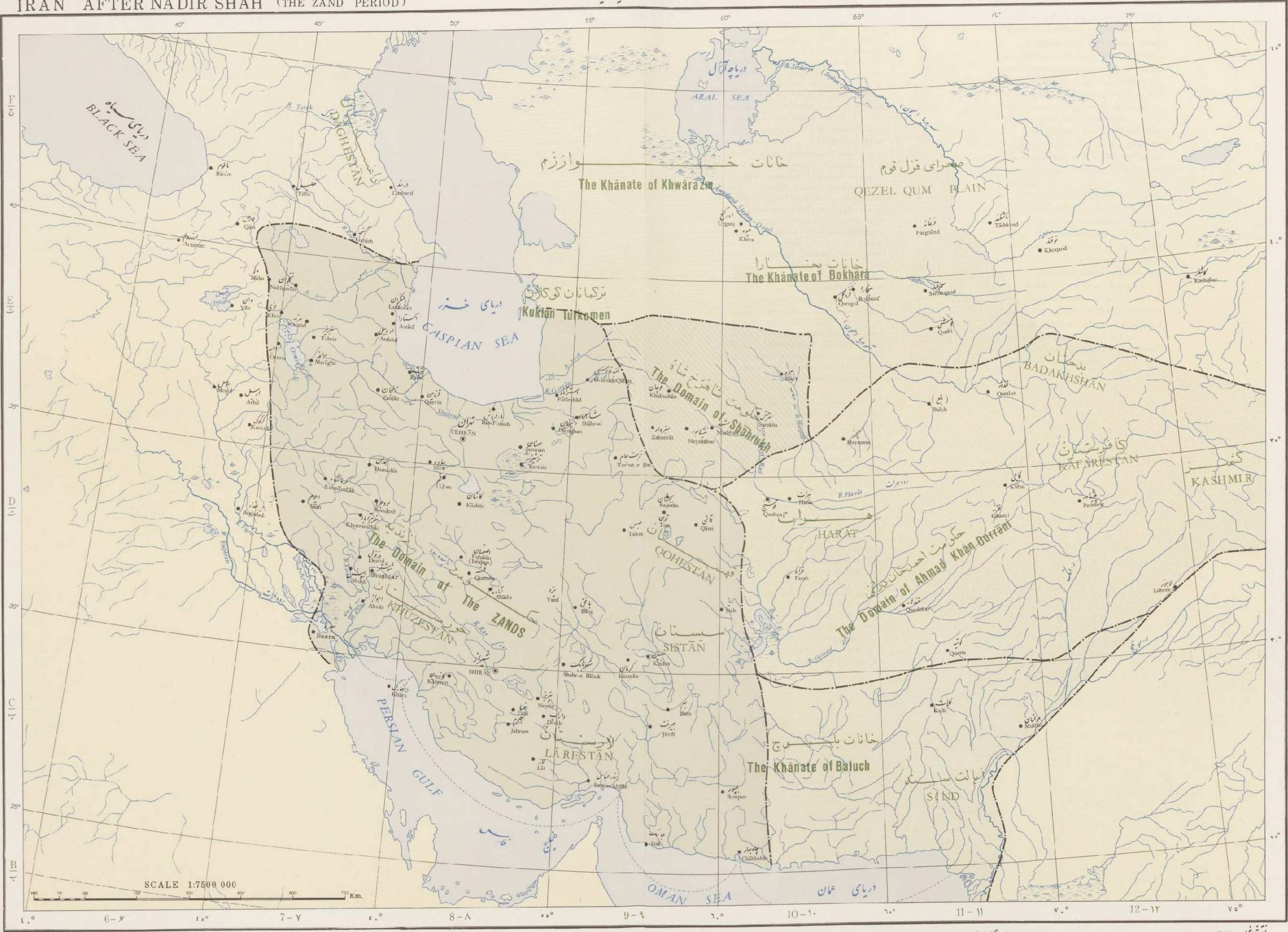
Zandiyeh government map. The city of Kazerun is located in the southwest of Iran.

Khajeh Ali Qoli Khan Afshar Kazeruni, the then ruler of Kazerun, played an important role in the establishment and stabilization of the Zand dynasty. In 1753, when Karim Khan Zand was preparing to fight Azad Khan Afghan and his representative, Fath-Ali Khan Afshar, in Khesht, 60 kilometers from today's Kazerun, Ruler of Kazerun joined Karim Khan Zand's army with riflemen from Kazerun. Karim Khan, who was defeated by Azad Khan in the battle of Kamarej in 1754, was able to defeat the Azad Khan's army with the help of forces of Kazerun.

After that, the ruler of Kazerun became one of the trusted and very close people to Karim Khan Zand. However, in 1761, when Karim Khan Zand sent some of the nobles of Fars region, including the ruler of Kazerun, to suppress the rebellion of Fath-Ali Khan Afshar in Azerbaijan, the Fars army was defeated by the army of Fath-Ali Khan Afshar in Qareh Chaman near Tabriz, and some of these nobles from The rule of Kazerun is that they escape from battle.

They are arrested in Isfahan and the ruler of Kazerun is sentenced to be blinded. With the intercession of Mirza Mohammad Kalantar, the Fars Sheriff, Khajeh Ali Qoli Khan Afshar, the ruler of Kazerun is forgiven. In 1784, when Jafar Khan Zand conquered Isfahan, the ruler of Kazerun was also one of his companions. After that, Jafar Khan Zand appointed him to ruler of Qom and Kashan, and in the same year, Khajeh Ali Qoli Khan Afshar Kazeruni suppressed the revolt of Jandaq Arabs led by Mohammad Hasan Khan Arab Ameli. But he promised him the security of his life and sent him to Isfahan, to Jafar Khan Zand. But Jafar Khan, contrary to his promise, ordered the murder of Mohammad Hasan Khan Arab Ameli and his entourage. This issue made Khajeh Ali Qoli Khan Afshar very angry, and he left the government of Qom and Kashan and returned to his hometown Kazerun. After returning to Kazerun, he gathered some of the troops of Kuhmareh region and the nomads around Kazerun and encouraged them to overthrow Jafar Khan Zand from the kingdom. Jafar Khan, the king of Zand, after learning about this issue, sent some nobles to Kazerun to console him and invited him to Shiraz.

But after the departure of Khajeh Ali Qoli Khan Afshar Kazeruni to Shiraz, Jafar Khan Zand broke his promise and imprisoned him along with a number of Zand nobles in the Arg of Karim Khan of Shiraz on charges of unworthiness. khajeh Ali Qoli Khan Afshar Kazeruni also provoked the nobles of Zand to escape from prison and escaped from prison with tricks. He and other fugitives secretly went to the Harem of Jafar Khan Zand and killed this king.

Following this incident, Sayed Morad Khan Zand, who was imprisoned in the Arg of Karim Khan along with Khajeh Ali Qoli Khan Afshar Kazeruni, became king and immediately elected Khajeh Ali Qoli Khan Afshar Kazaruni as the Ruler of Fars region.

But the kingdom of Sayed Morad Khan Zand lasted only for a short time and Lotf Ali Khan Zand, the son of Jafar Khan Zand rose against him and killed him and all the people who were involved in his father's murder. However, with the mediation of Haj Ebrahim Kalantar, the sheriff of Fars and other nobles and elders of Fars forgave the guilt of Khajeh Ali Qoli Khan Afshar, who played the main role in the murder of his father.

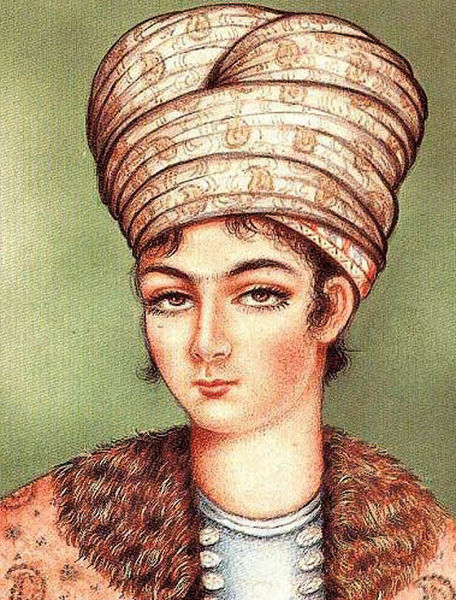
At the end of Zand's rule, Lotf Ali Khan Zand attacked Kazerun and arrested and blinded the ruler of Kazerun

Apparently, after these events, Khajeh Reza Qoli Khan Afshar, the brother of Khajeh Ali Qoli Khan Afshar, becomes the ruler of Kazerun in his place. In 1790, after the capture of Shiraz by Haj Ibrahim Kalantar and the prevention of Lotf Ali Khan Zand's entry into Shiraz, and at the same time as Agha Mohammad Khan Qajar and his army of 60,000 men moved towards Fars, Khajeh Reza Qoli Khan Afshar Kazeruni, along with his brother, was united with Agha Mohammad Khan Qajar and Haj Ebrahim Kalantar. The ruler of Kazerun became a close friend of Agha Mohammad Khan Qajar and participated in his wars against Lotf Ali Khan Zand.

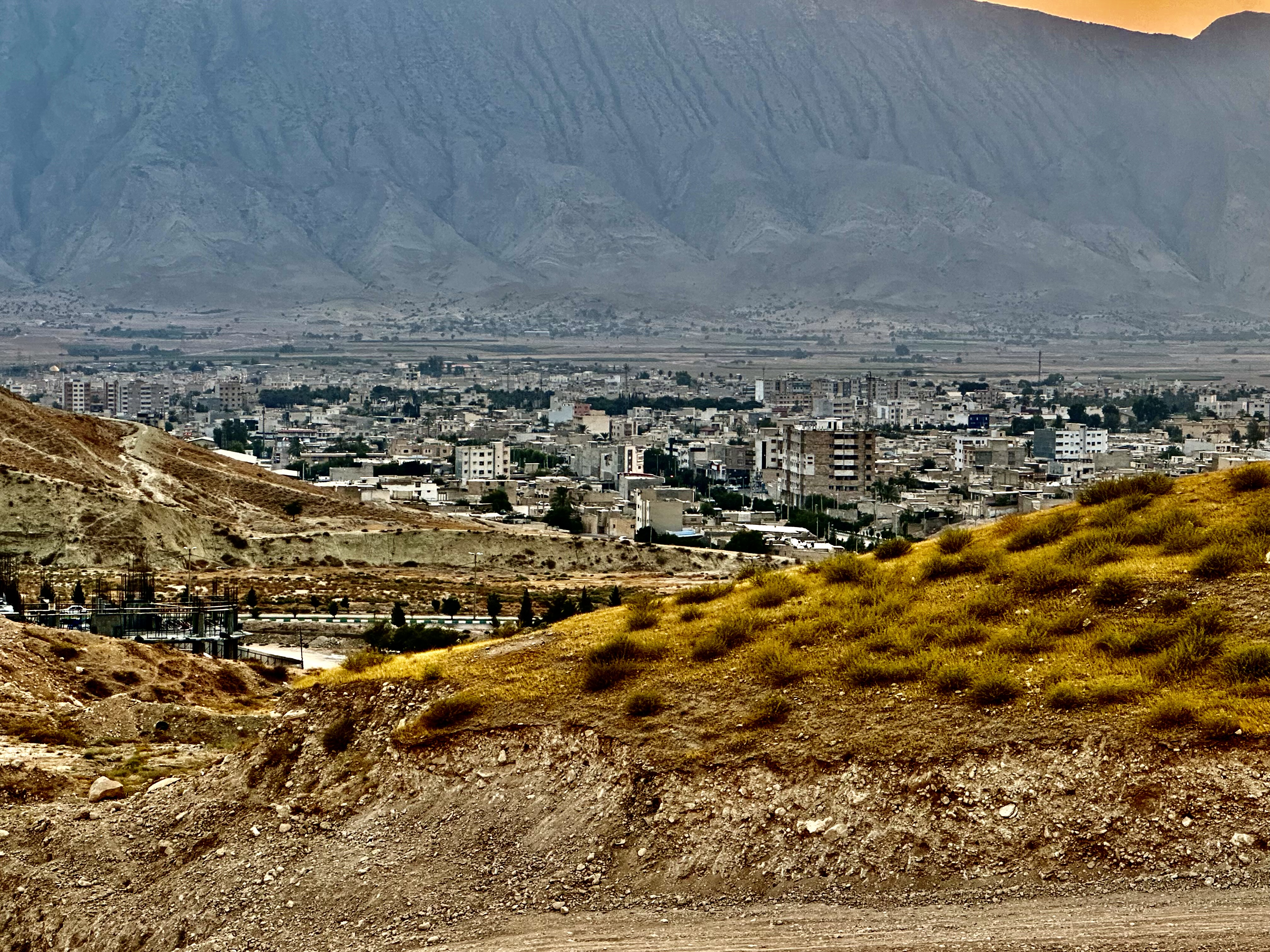
The Qebleh mountain range in the south of the city of Kazerun, through which Lotf-Ali Khan Zand and his companions escaped

Finally, when Lotf Ali Khan Zand was on his way to the south from Kazerun, the ruler of Kazerun surrounded him and his forces and planned to arrest Lotf Ali Khan and hand him over to Agha Mohammad Khan Qajar. Lotf Ali Khan Zand and his forces left their horses and fled from the Qebleh mountain range located in the south of Kazerun city towards Dashtestan and Bushehr.

Lotf Ali Khan Zand returned to Kazerun after gathering forces in that area and during a battle, arrested Khajeh Reza Qoli Khan Afshar Kazeruni and blinded him and his children for revenge.

==== Qajar dynasty ====
Images

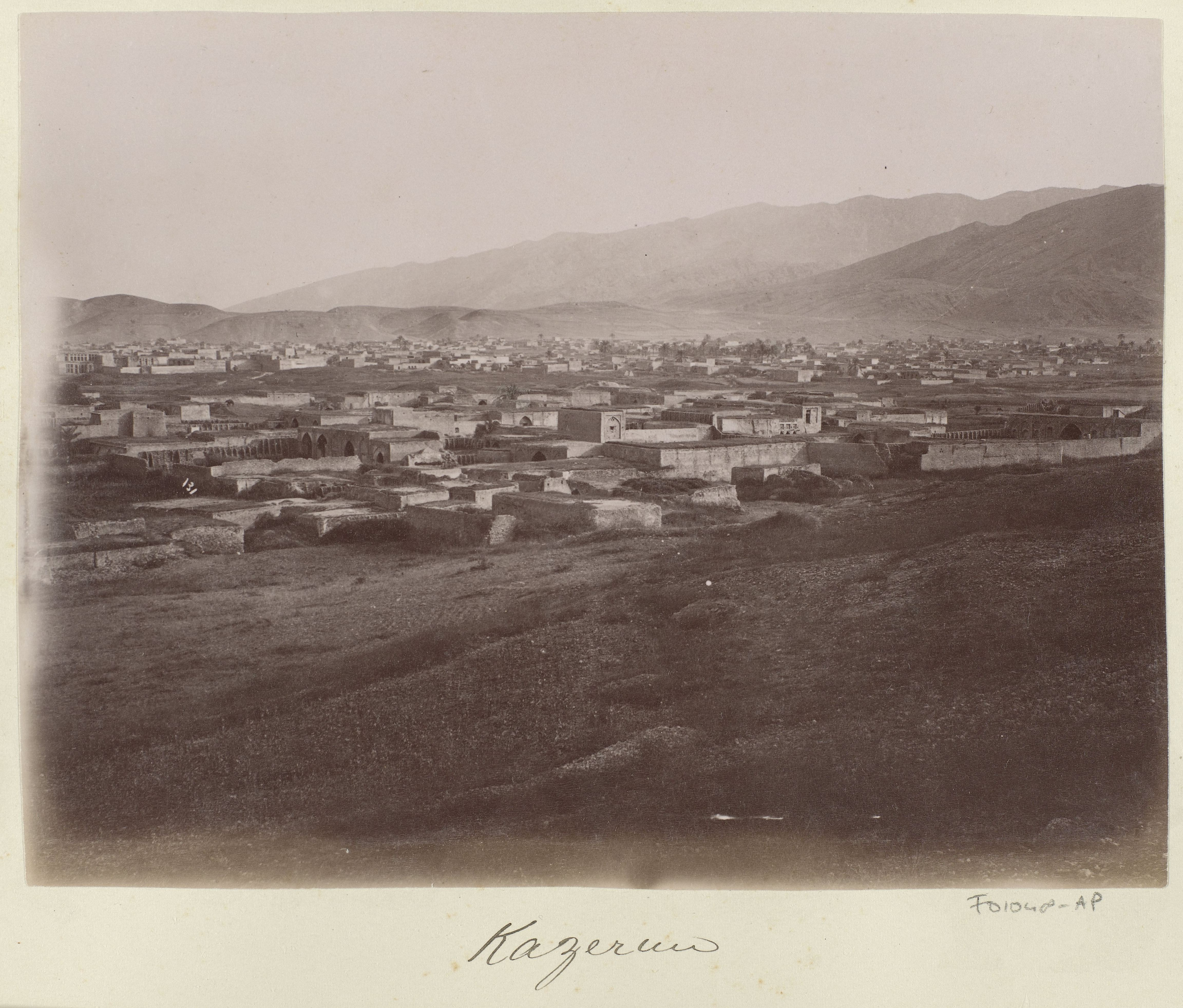
Kazerun city in the Qajar era

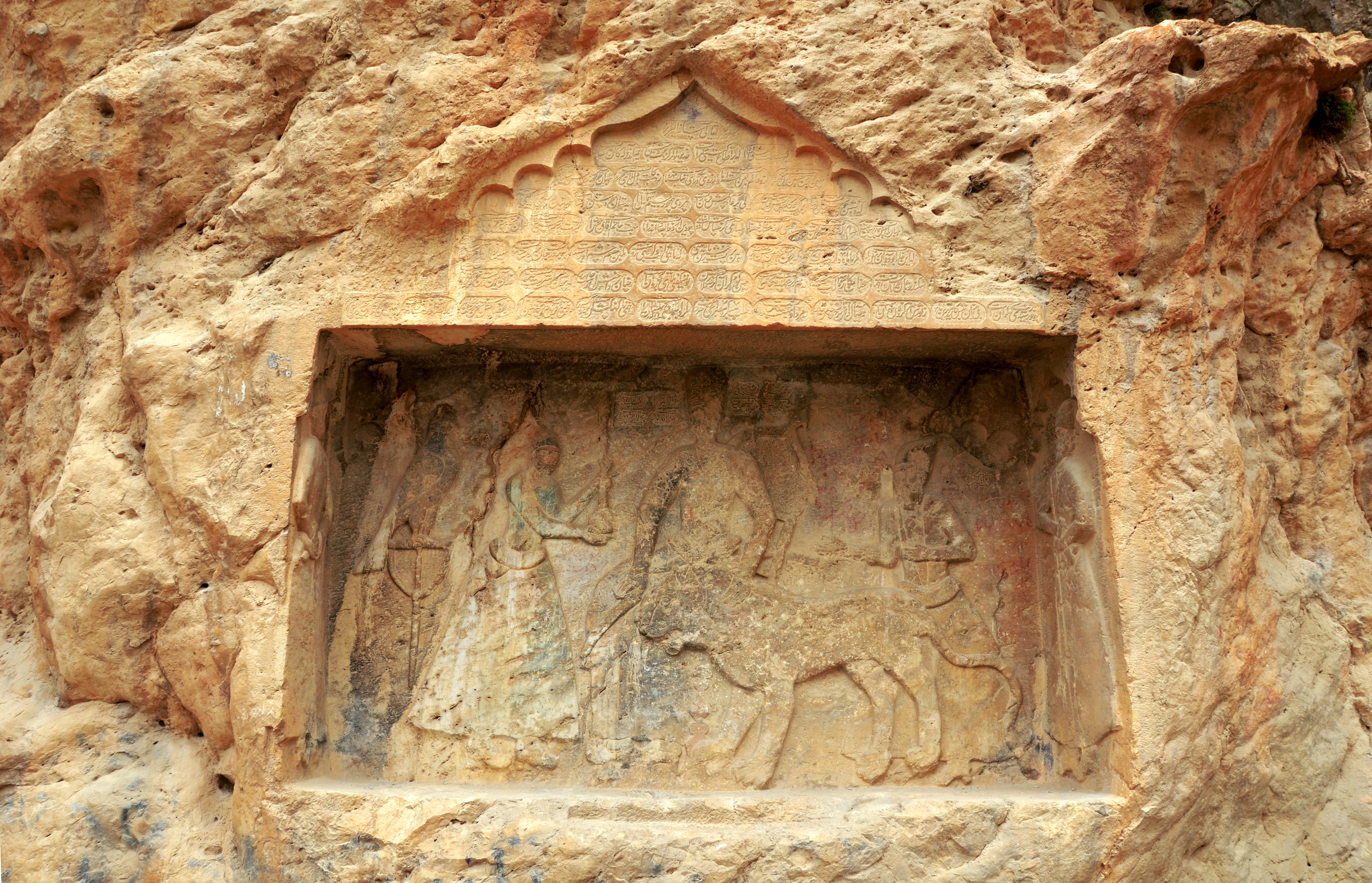
The relief of Teymour Mirza, the ruler of Kazerun and the grandson of Fath-Ali Shah Qajar, which was carved on a mountain near Kazerun by his order and in the style of the Sassanid kings' reliefs in Chowgan valley of Kazerun

In June 1824, a severe earthquake occurred in Kazerun that killed a few thousand people. Following the Persian famine between 1870 and 1872, out of the population of about 10,000 people in the city of Kazerun, about 4,000 people were killed and about 4,000 people were forced to emigrate, and the population of the city of Kazerun decreased to about 2,000 people, which is considered one of the biggest tragedies and demographic shocks in the history of this city. Kazerun was one of the cities with the highest percentage of people killed in this famine.

After the Qajar dynasty came to power, the Afshar clan, who had previously fought alongside Agha Mohammad Khan Qajar for his rise to power, were again assigned to the government of Kazerun. The last person of this dynasty who ruled Kazerun was a person named Khajeh Abbas Qoli Khan Afshar Kazeruni who was deposed in 1844 and the rule of Kazerun was removed from the hands of the Afshar dynasty after about 350 years. After that, the ruler of Kazerun was appointed by the central government and different people ruled in Kazerun.

For example, in 1856 and during the time of Naser al-Din Shah Qajar, Ali Mohammad Khan Qavam al-Mulk was appointed to the government of Kazerun. At one time, Teymur Mirza, the grandson of Fath-Ali Shah Qajar, was in charge of Kazerun.

After that, Amir Azodi's family came to power in Kazerun. Khajeh Hassan Ali was the sheriff of Kazerun for a while, and after him, his son, Khajeh Ebrahim Kalantar, was the sheriff. After the death of Khajeh Ebrahim, his brother Khajeh Abdollah Amir Azodi, known as Naser Divan Kazeruni, became the sheriff of Kazerun.

The end of the Qajar rule coincided with the First World War and the occupation of southern Iran by the British. Naser Divan Kazeruni, the sheriff of Kazerun, declared war on the British and fought with them for years. During these years, the city of Kazerun and its surroundings were the scene of many battles.

Images

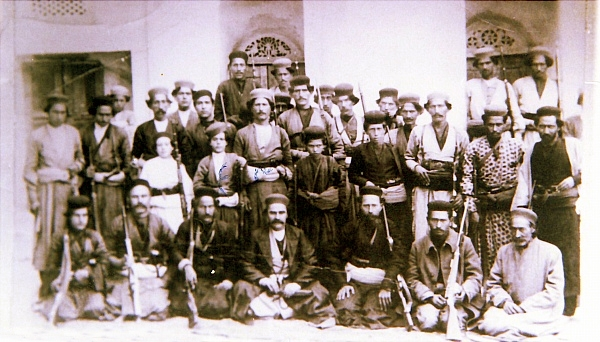
Naser Divan Kazeruni (seated in the middle) along with a number of fighters from Kazerun and other cities

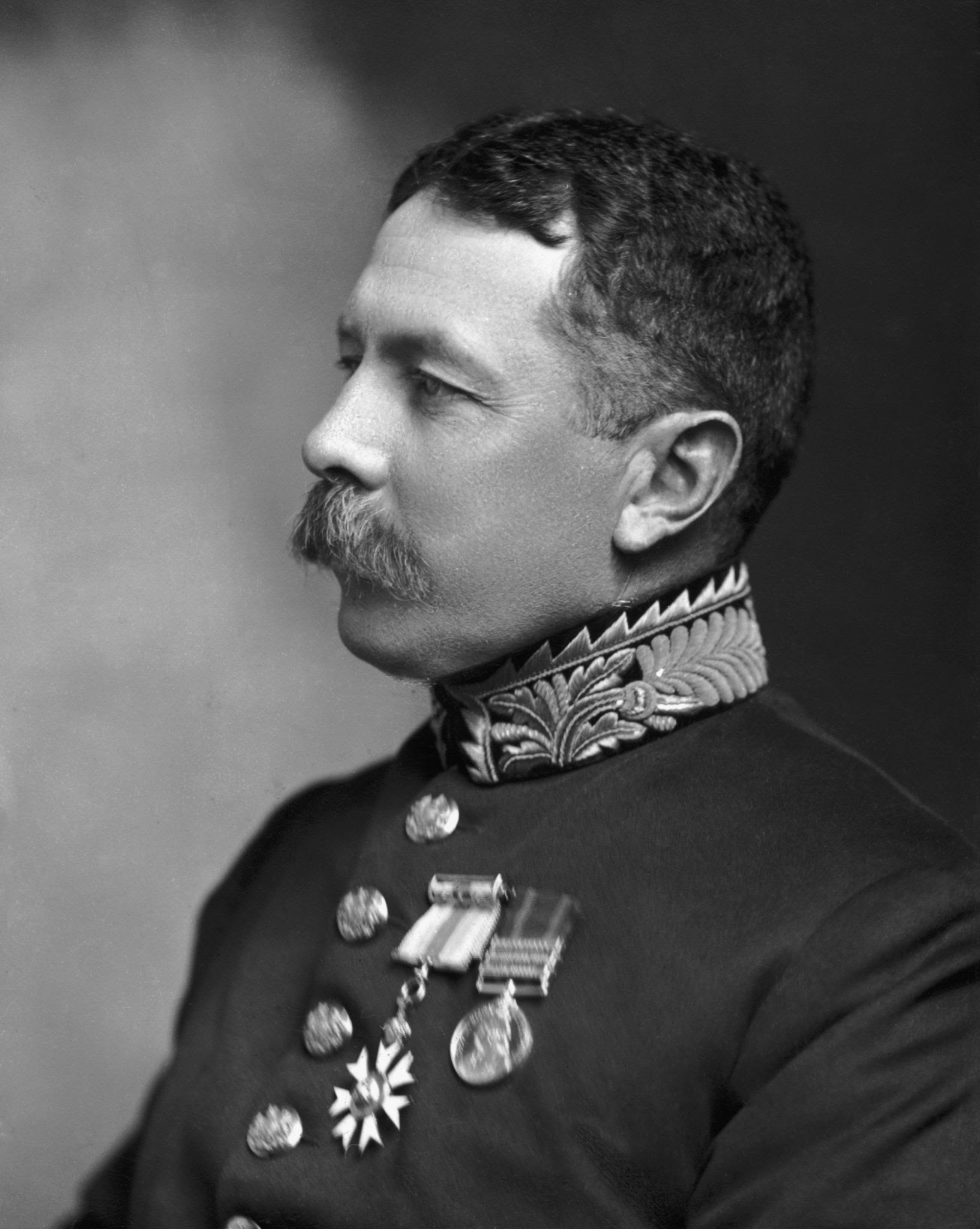
General Percy Sykes, the founder of the South Persia Rifles and the one who ordered the attack on the city of Kazerun

In the first action in 1907, Naser Divan Kazeruni and a group of riflemen from Kazerun blocked the way of British troops who were planning to leave for Shiraz and delayed their stay in Kazerun and Shiraz for several years.

In 1911, after an unsuccessful attempt to arrest Naser Divan by the British, which led to the killing of Captain Ohlson and Nasser Divan's departure from the city, an English officer named Colonel Medil became the temporary ruler of Kazerun, who executed some of the fighters of Kazerun and He imprisoned some people, which angered the people of Kazerun.

However, with the appointment of Ahmad Akhgar as the commander of the gendarmerie forces of Kazerun, who himself was considered a pro-liberation figure, and the return of Naser Divan Kazeruni to the city, the anger of the people subsided.

The sensitivity of the people of Kazerun on the actions of the British in other cities, made Megerdich, the British telegrapher who was in charge of the Kazerun telegraph office, cut the telegraph wire on the order of the British, which caused him to be arrested by the Kazerun freedom fighters.

In 1915, the freedom fighters of Kazerun, together with the fighters of some other regions, decided to attack the British forces in Bushehr and liberate this city. But finally, Wilhelm Wassmuss dissuades them from attacking and suggests that they leave the liberation of this city to the people of the same region and wait for bigger battles.

After the revolt of the Fars gendarmerie forces and despite the fact that Kazerun was monitored and controlled by the British in every way, Naser Divan Kazeruni sent 700 fighting riflemen with the help of the Shiraz gendarmerie forces and 200 riflemen to help the people of Dashtestan. Finally, the rebellion of the Fars Gendarmerie was suppressed and this organization became the South Persia Rifles, under the supervision of the British.

The British deployed the South Persia Rifles in several important cities in the south of the country, including Kazerun. Naser Divan and the freedom fighters of Kazerun, who were dissatisfied with this issue, declared war on them in 1916 and disarmed the South Persia Rifles headquarters in Kazerun. They also arrested Amir Nosrat Nouri, the then governor of Kazerun.

For more than 3 years, forces from Kazerun also blocked the main north–south road between the Persian Gulf and Shiraz. Following this incident, Abdol-Hossein Farman Farma, Governor of Fars wrote in a telegraph to Tehran that as he had predicted, the revolution in Fars had started.

General Percy Sykes, one of the British officials and the founder of the South Persia Rifles, upon hearing the news of this incident, sent his troops to Kazerun. But before the English forces arrived in Kazerun, the Kazerun riflemen blocked the way for the British in the Dasht-e Arzhan area. Clashes accompanied between the two sides caused the British to retreat towards Shiraz.

In this battle, Captain Vetikogol, one of the British officials, was also killed. The author of the book Police of Southern Iran wrote as follows:

There was nothing left for all of them to be surrounded by the enemy (Fighters from Kazerun) in the plain, who escaped from the encirclement ring with a quick and shameful escape and from there returned to Khaneh Zenyan and entered Shiraz on December 28. On the other hand, the enemy showed will and skill He revealed that it surprised the South Persia Rifles. It is certain that they had much more favorable positions and apparently their number was not more than 400 people, they proved to be very skilled snipers who did not waste a bullet.

After that, Naser Divan Kazeruni and his riflemen attacked Shiraz in alliance with Qashqai warriors and captured this city. But in the end, with the threat of the fall of Kazerun intensifying, Naser Divan left Shiraz and returned to Kazerun.

Finally, the British attacked Kazerun in 1919. Following this incident, Naser Divan Kazeruni was arrested and exiled, and his comrades were also imprisoned.

The north–south road of the country was reopened after more than three years and with the presence of 20 thousand people.

Ali Naghi Behrouzi, an author from Kazerun who witnessed this incident in his childhood, wrote about this incident years later:

We were sleeping comfortably at night when we suddenly woke up from the thunderous sound of cannons, rifles and machine guns that shook the city. Children and women began to cry and mourn, and men held Qurans in their hands and turned to the sky, so that God would protect them from the harm of bullets. In the east of Kazerun, where the road to Shiraz starts, there is a hill that used to have a tower and a castle on top of it, and it completely dominates the city of Kazerun. The South Persia Rifles forces reached that fort in the dark at night and occupied it, and once they shelled the city of Kazerun, and especially the house of Naser Divan, which they considered their enemy, and which was in the middle of the city, was targeted by bullets. Of course, Kazerun riflemen also responded to their shooting; But what's the use?! Because firstly, they had cannons and artillery, but Naser Divan didn't have it, and secondly, although Naser Divan could resist them for a while, he was afraid that the city of Kazerun would be destroyed and innocent people would be killed. Therefore, after one or two days, he evacuated Kazerun at night and went to the village of Davan, and they rushed to the city the next day and looted it.

In one of the British reports regarding the reopening of Kazerun road, it is stated as follows:

In this way, the road to Bushehr was safe and opened, the objectives of Bushehr's field forces were fulfilled in every way. However, the task force remained in Kazerun for another three months. A very modern fort was built in Kazerun and the Indian infantry were stationed in a series of outposts along the road.

After capturing Kazerun, the British appointed a person named Salar Mo'tazed to govern Kazerun temporarily. In 1918, Kazerun became one of the first cities in Iran to have a Baladiyeh (Municipality). during the Qajar dynasty many people from Kazerun migrated to Bahrain, today there are many people with the surname Kazeruni.

==== Pahlavi dynasty ====
Map of Fars and ports province in 1956. Kazerun was the second most populated city of this province in that year.

With the beginning of the Pahlavi rule, the sovereignty of Kazerun remained in the hands of Naser Divan Kazeruni, who had returned from exile, until 1941. In 1931, following the change of the administrative system, Baladiyeh of Kazerun became Kazerun Municipality.

Following the establishment of official political divisions in 1937, Iran was divided into 10 provinces, and Kazerun was placed in the seventh province (Fars and Ports). In 1946, this province was divided into 7 counties, including Kazerun. In this year, the governorate of Kazerun County was established with the center of Kazerun city. At that time, Kazerun County, in addition to the current area, included the current counties of Mamasani, Rostam, Kuhchenar, as well as Arzhan District of Shiraz County and parts of Dashtestan County, all of which in the following years became independent or separated from the body of Kazerun County. In the 1960s, Kohgiluyeh and Boyer-Ahmad province was part of the Kazerun County, which later became an independent province. The population of Kazerun city (without suburbs) in the first official census of Iran in 1956 was about 31,000 people. In this year, Kazerun was considered as the second largest and most populous city in Fars and Ports province and one of the 30 most populous cities in Iran.

During the 1953 Iranian coup d'état, the people of Kazerun supported Mohammad Mosaddegh.

In 1964, with the construction of a new road from the north to the south of the country, which passed through the city of Kazerun, this city was in a communication deadlock, and this issue caused a severe economic blow to the city and the widespread migration of the people of Kazerun to other cities.

The representatives of Kazerun in the National Consultative Assembly included Khosrowparviz, Zabihi Soltan Ahmadi, Tabatabaei, Sadeghi, Jabbari and Behnia, each of whom represented Kazerun in this parliament for one or more terms.

==== Islamic Republic ====
The current area of Kazerun County in the west of Fars province

During the Iran–Iraq War, 1,300 fighters of Kazerun were martyred. Kazerun had the highest number of martyrs among all Iranian cities in the two operations to Liberation of Susangerd and Karbala-4.

In 2018, the people of Kazerun gathered in protest against the division of Kazerun County and demanded the formation of a new province centered on the city of Kazerun. In 2019, Kazerun governorate was promoted to a special governorate.

== Demographics ==
=== Population ===
At the time of the 2006 National Census, the city's population was 84,594 in 20,810 households. The following census in 2011 counted 89,685 people in 25,034 households. The 2016 census measured the population of the city as 96,683 people in 28,988 households. It is the fifth-largest city in Fars.

== Climate ==
Kazerun has a hot semi-arid climate (Köppen climate classification: BSh).

Climate data for Kazerun (2006-2010)
Month	Jan	Feb	Mar	Apr	May	Jun	Jul	Aug	Sep	Oct	Nov	Dec	Year
Daily mean °C (°F)	9.9 (49.8)	13.5 (56.3)	17.5 (63.5)	21.5 (70.7)	28.5 (83.3)	32.1 (89.8)	33.9 (93.0)	33.6 (92.5)	29.9 (85.8)	25.0 (77.0)	17.8 (64.0)	11.9 (53.4)	22.9 (73.3)
Mean daily minimum °C (°F)	4.2 (39.6)	7.5 (45.5)	10.0 (50.0)	14.5 (58.1)	20.5 (68.9)	23.8 (74.8)	26.1 (79.0)	25.9 (78.6)	21.7 (71.1)	17.0 (62.6)	10.7 (51.3)	5.5 (41.9)	15.6 (60.1)
Average precipitation mm (inches)	71.6 (2.82)	49.9 (1.96)	39.3 (1.55)	20.9 (0.82)	2.6 (0.10)	1.0 (0.04)	0.0 (0.0)	0.0 (0.0)	0.8 (0.03)	10.6 (0.42)	30.7 (1.21)	63.6 (2.50)	291 (11.45)
Source: IRIMO (precipitation), (temperatures)

== Tourism ==
Kazerun, having more than 300 historical monuments registered in the Iran National Heritage List, including the world collection of Bishapur, Shapur Cave and Tang-e Chogan and other historical monuments such as the Historic district of Kazerun, the tomb of famous people, caravanserais and fire temples, significant natural monuments such as Parishan Lake, Dasht-e Barm Forest, Daffodil farms of Kazerun, rivers and springs, religious attractions such as Imamzade Seyyed Hossein, mountain parks and historical gardens, museums and unique souvenirs are among the country's tourism hubs. Kazerun is also one of the cities with the most Sasanian period Historical monuments in the country. One of the nicknames of Kazerun is the Green city, which is due to the greenery of this city, especially in the mild seasons of the year. According to the head of the Cultural Heritage, Tourism and Handicrafts Department of Kazerun, in the Nowruz of 1403 Solar Hijri (2024), more than half a million people have visited the historical monuments of Kazerun. Also, according to the statistics of this department, in 1395 Solar Hijri (2016–2017), more than two million and 200 thousand people visited the historical attractions of Kazerun.

=== Bishapur ancient city ===
The ancient city of Bishapur, with an area of 200 hectares, was one of the capitals of Iran during the Sassanid Empire, and with its destruction after the Arab conquest of Persia, its people gradually migrated to the city of Kazerun.

This city is one of the registered works of Iran in the UNESCO World Heritage Site. Bishapur, which was built with the Greek urban planning method, includes a collection of magnificent works such as Anahita Temple, Valerian Palace, Mosaic Ayvam, Ceremonial Hall, inscriptions, castles and other historical monuments.

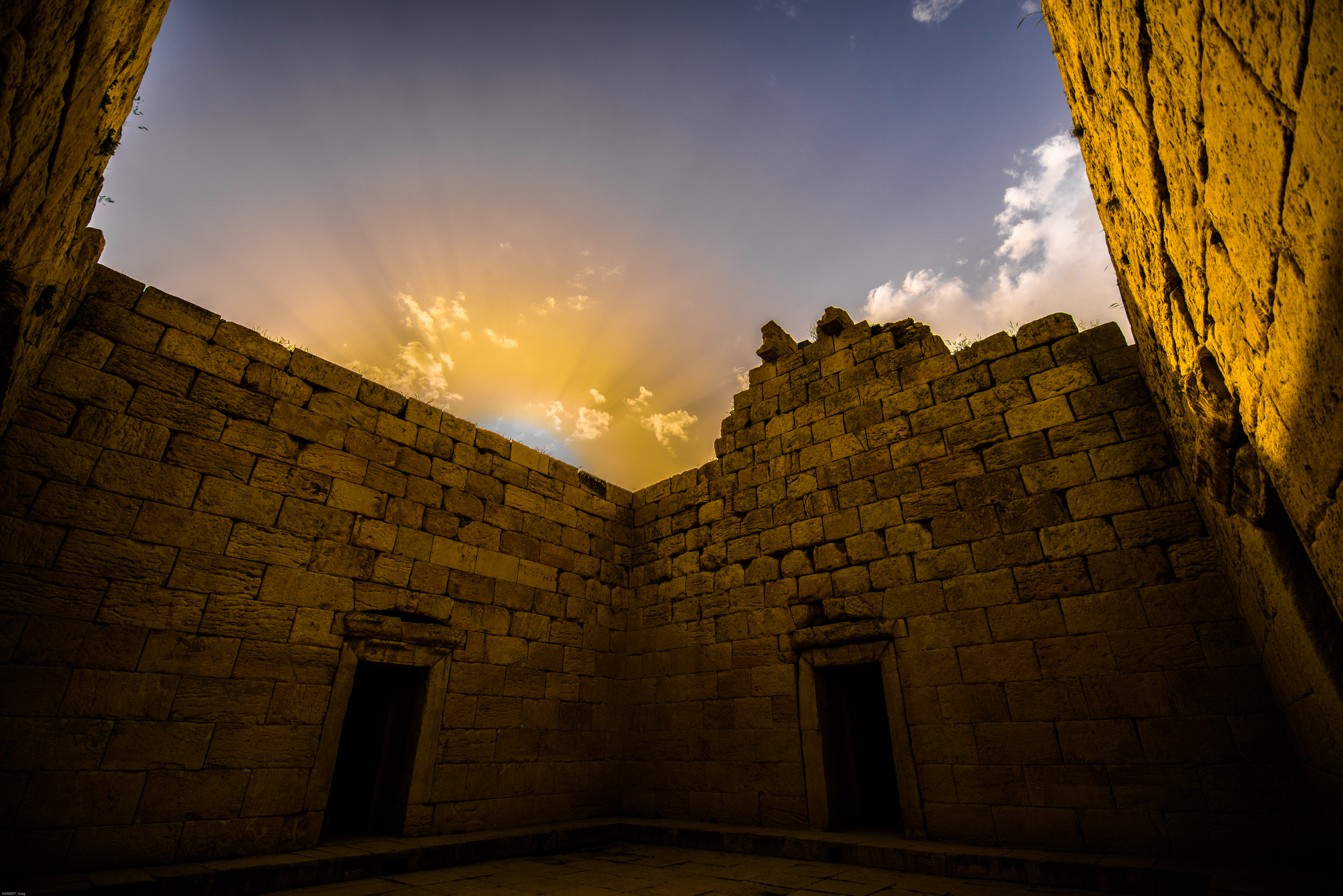
Anahita Temple

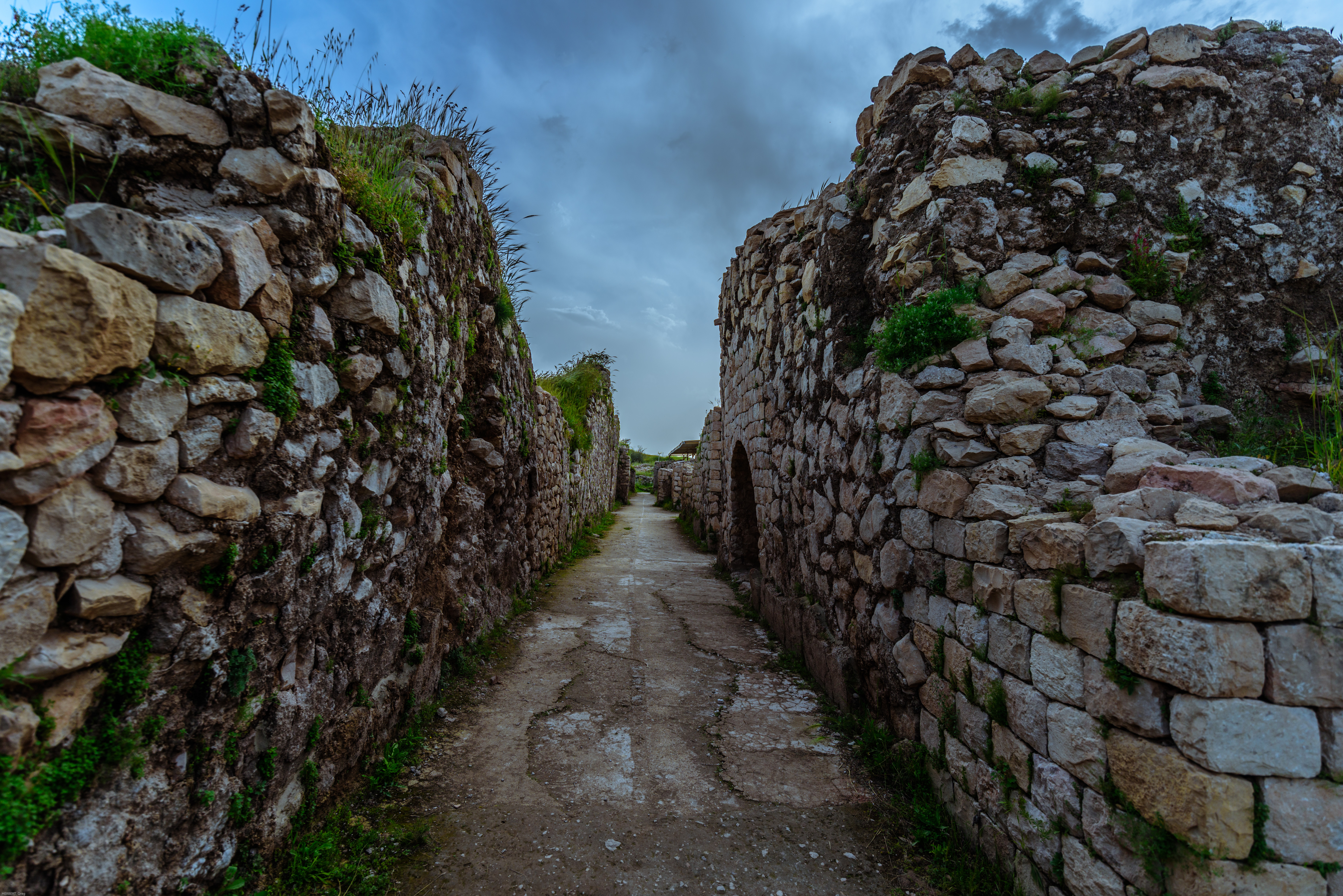
Bishapur Alleys

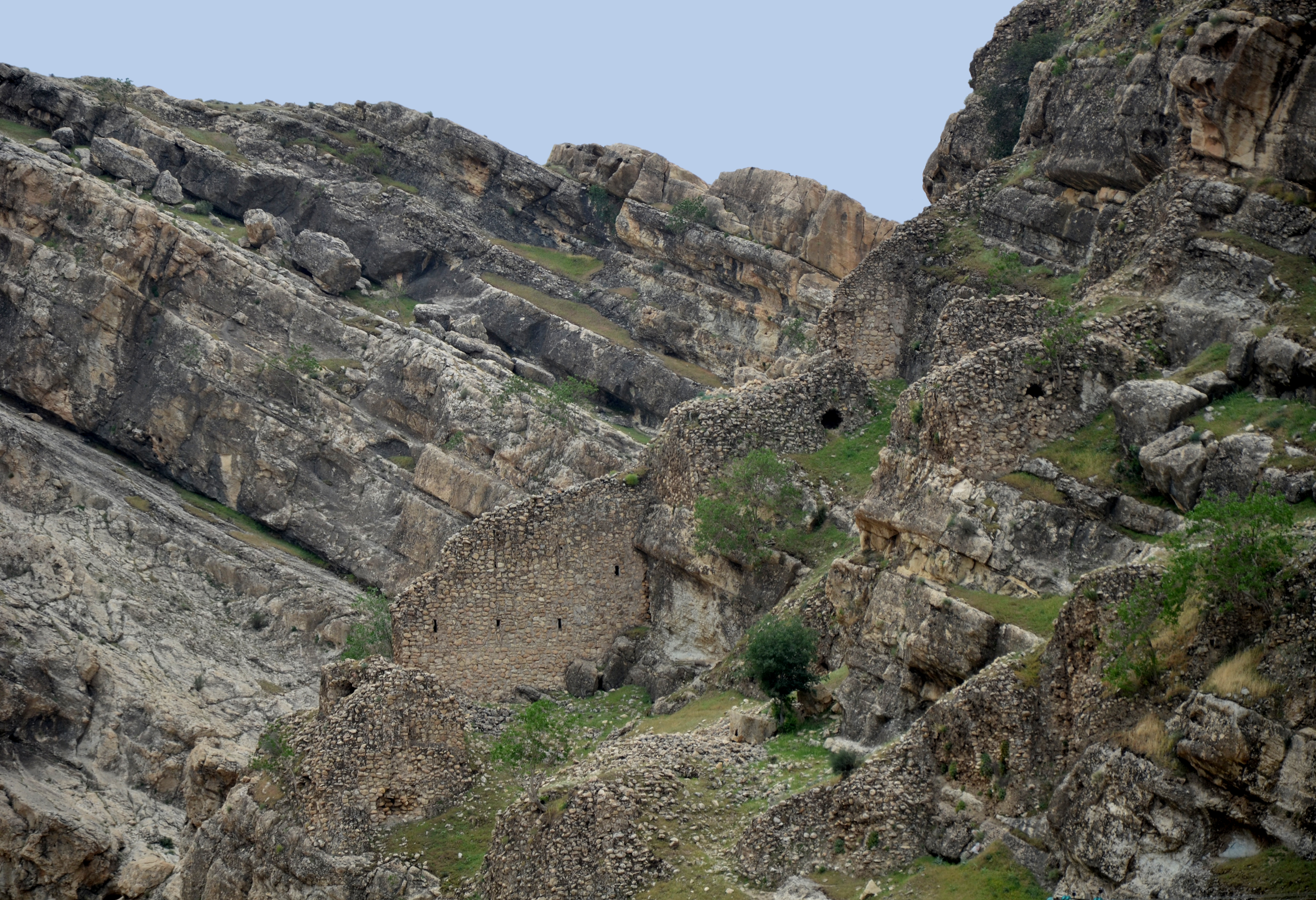
Daughter Castle of Bishapur

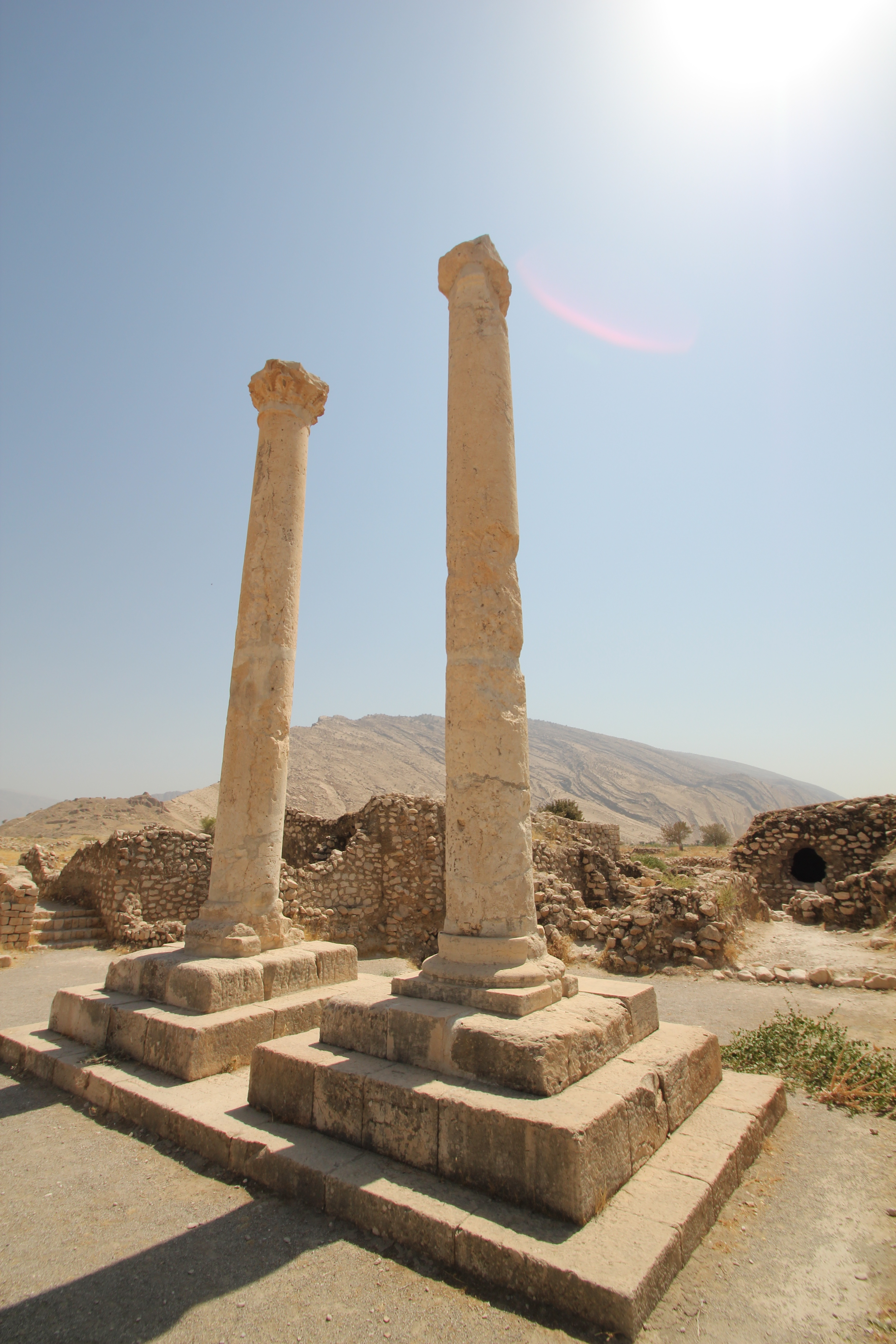
Bishapur memorial pillars

=== Shapur cave ===
Shapur Cave is located at an altitude of 800 meters above the ground and the statue of Shapur I, the Sassanid king, is located at a height of 7 meters at its entrance. This statue is considered the biggest statue of ancient Iran. Shapur cave is also included in the list of world Heritage Sites.

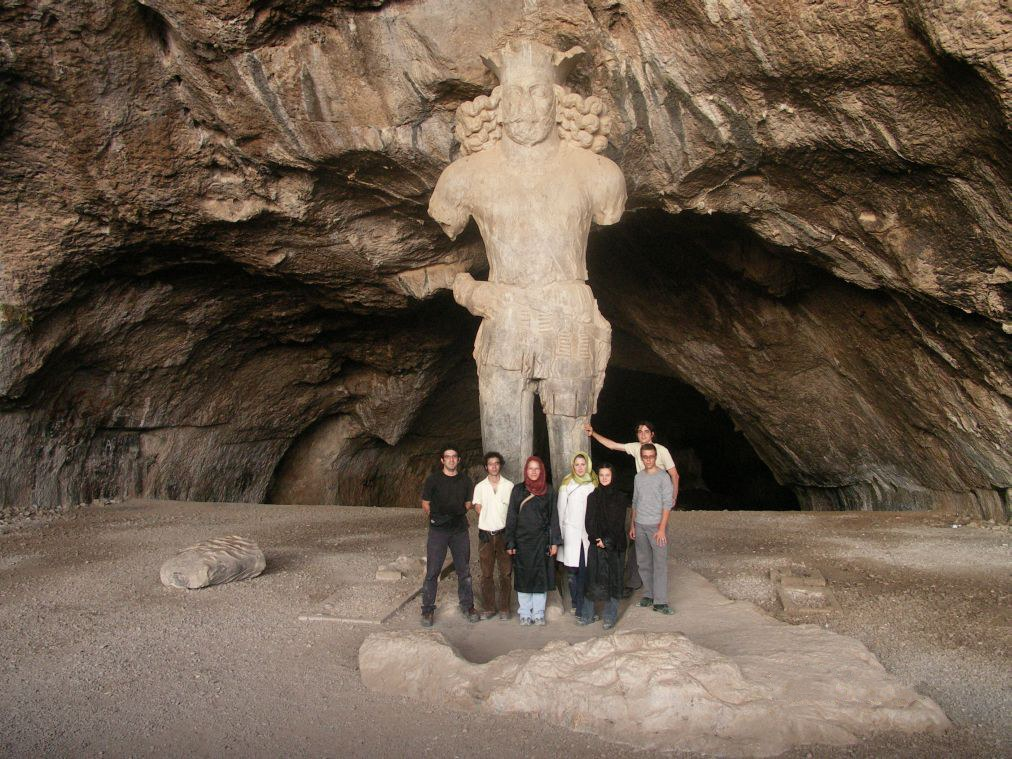
Colossal statue of Shapur I in Shapur cave

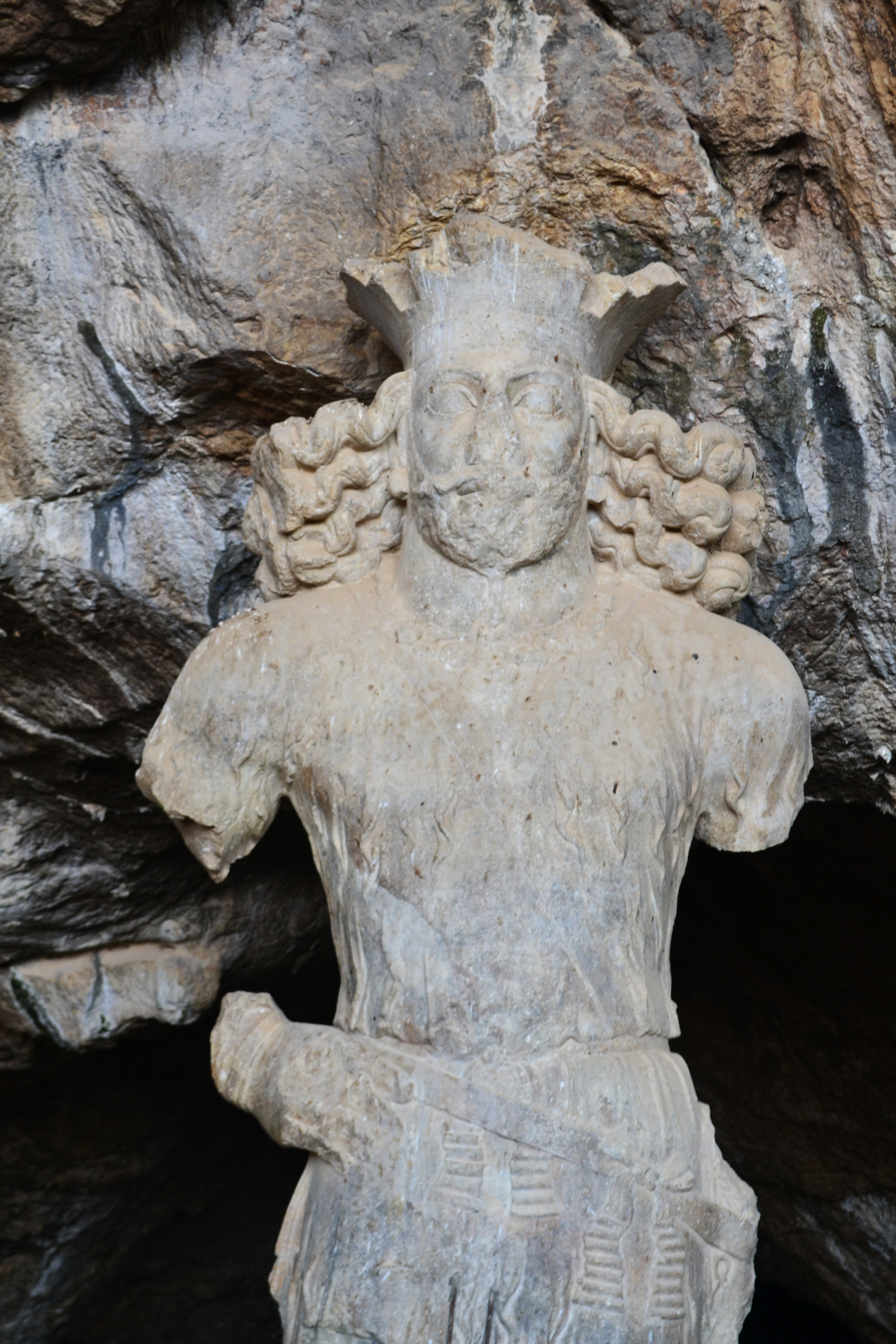
Colossal statue of Shapur I

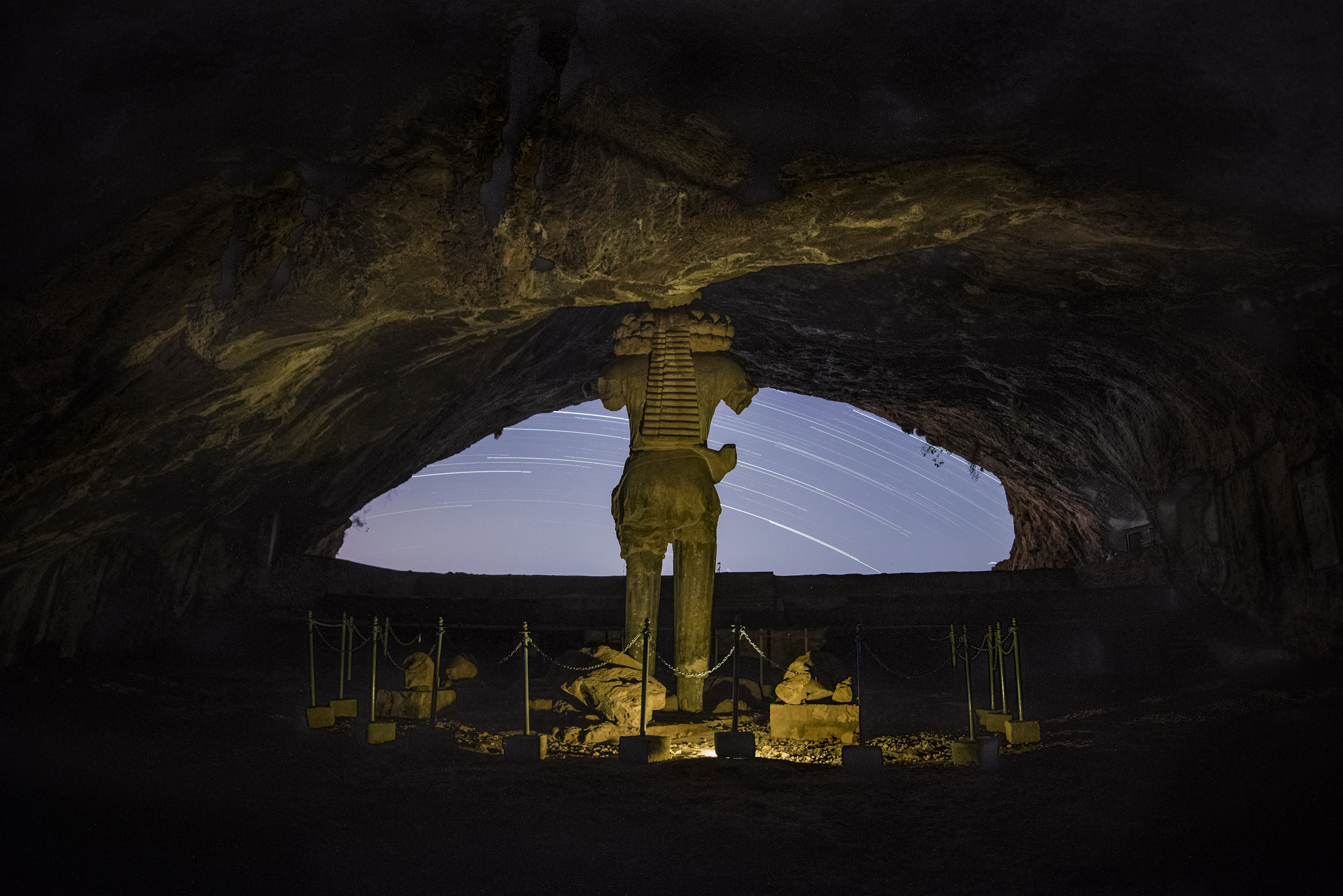
A view from behind the Shapur statue

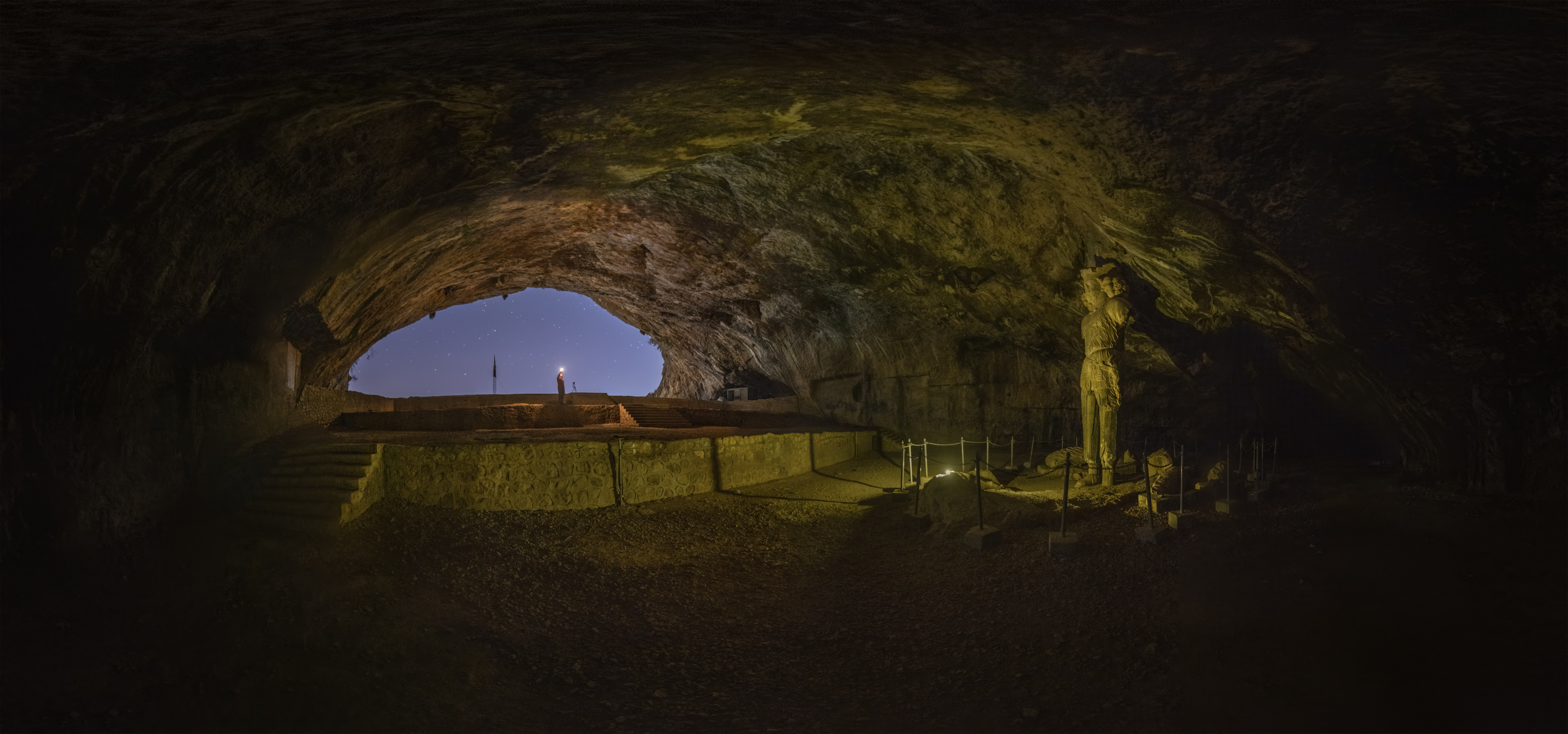
Entrance of Shapur Cave at night

=== Chogan valley ===
Chogan valley (romanized: Tang-e Chowgān) is a collection of 6 magnificent Reliefs of the Sasanian period that have been registered in the list of UNESCO World Heritage Sites. This Valley was the place where Sasanian kings played polo (Persian: چوگان romanized: Chowgān). The reliefs of Tang-e Chogan include the description of events such as the victory of Shapur I over three Roman emperors, the victory of Bahram II over the Arabs, the ceremony of receiving the Khvarenah by Shapur I from Ahura Mazda, the victory of Shapur II over rebels and other historical events.

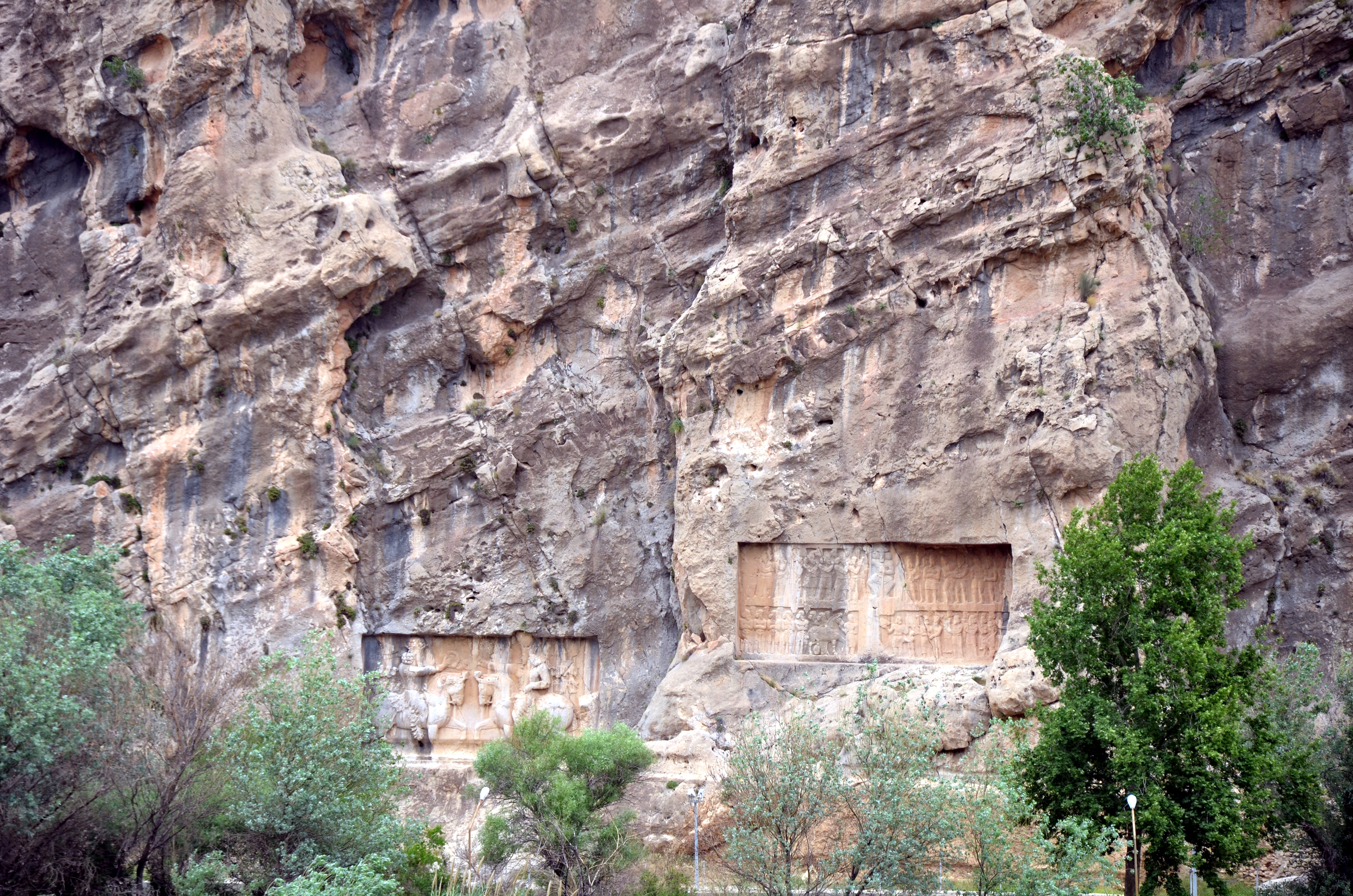
Reliefs in Tang-e Chogan

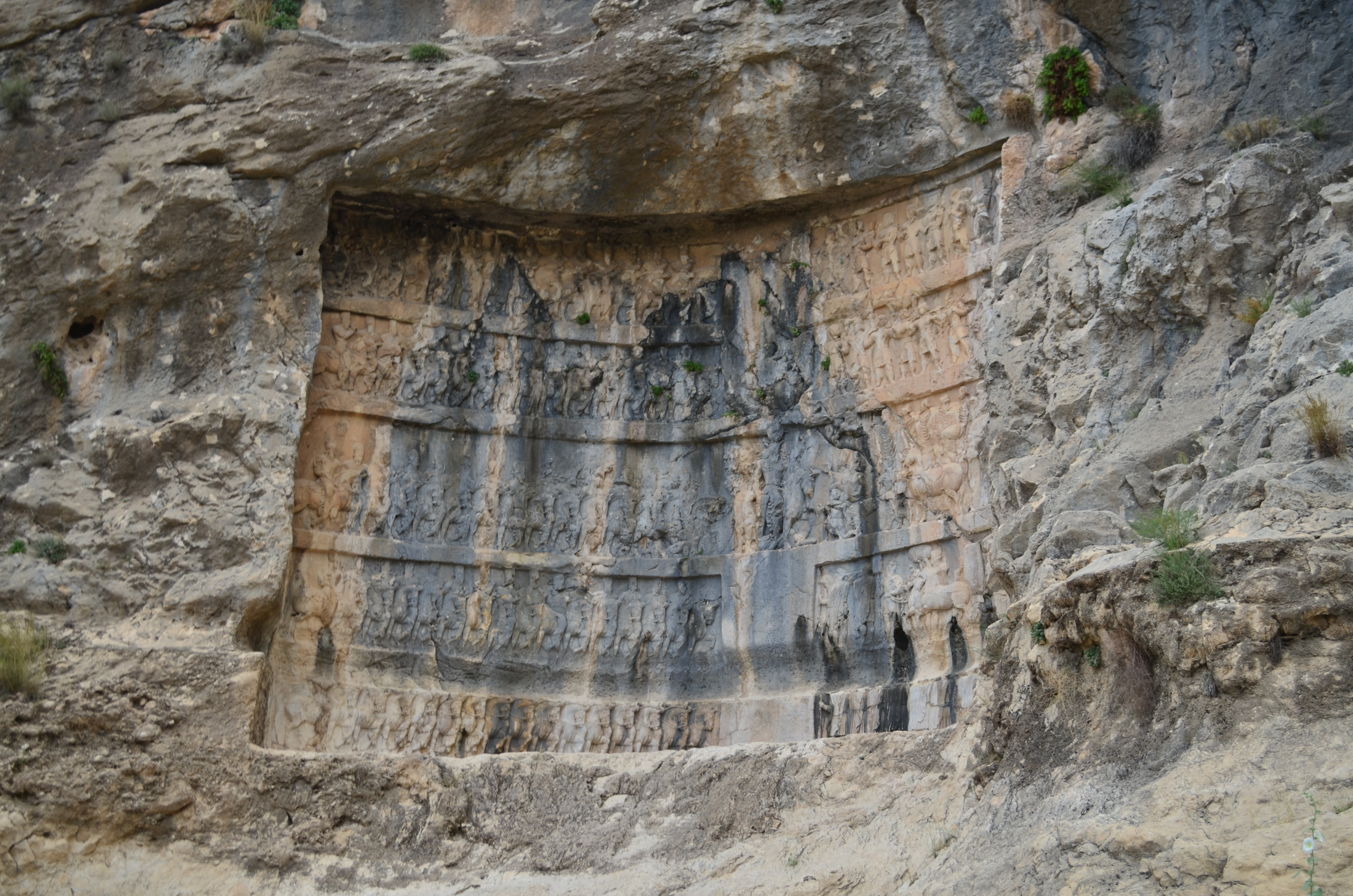
Relief in Tang-e Chogan

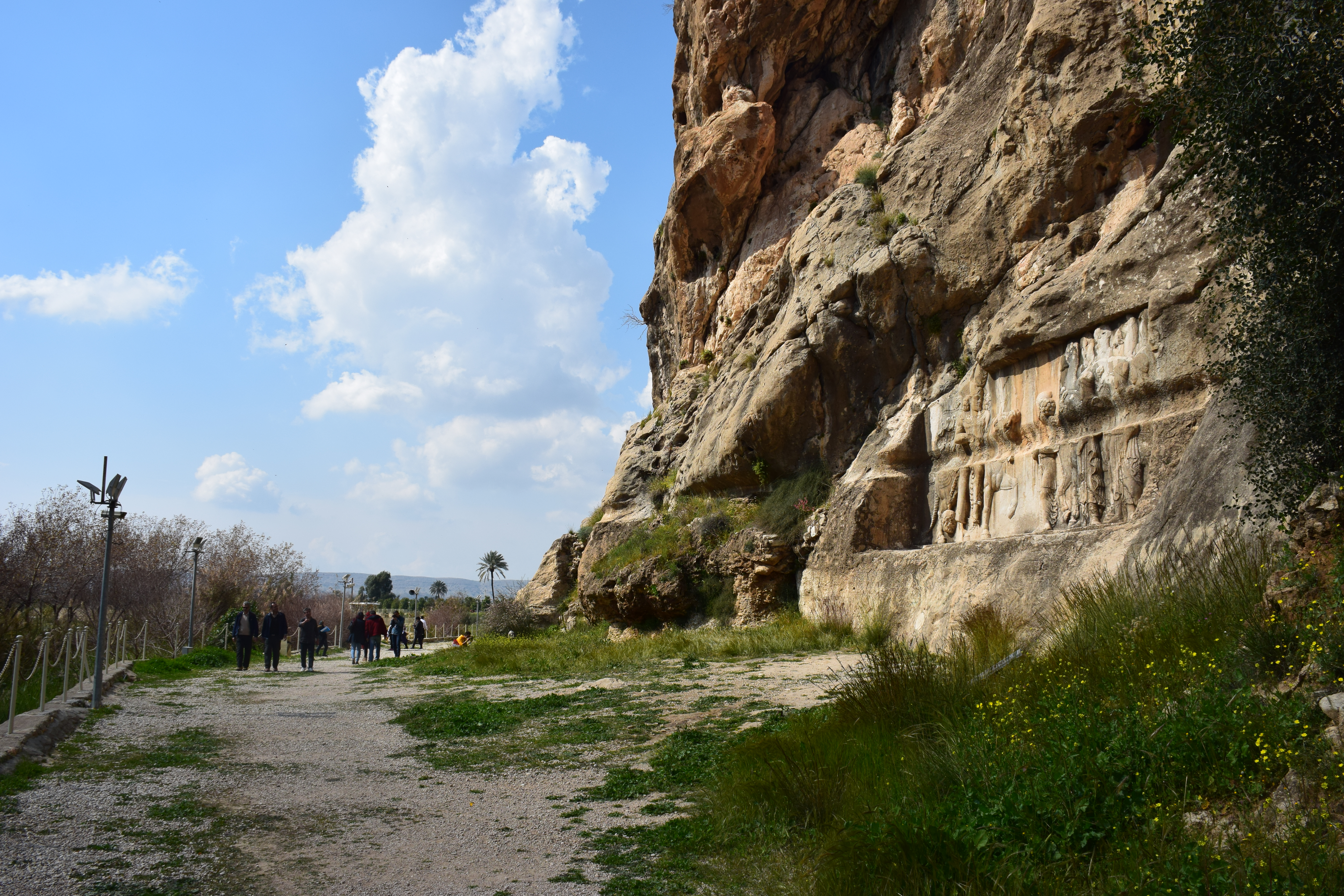
Tang-e Chogan

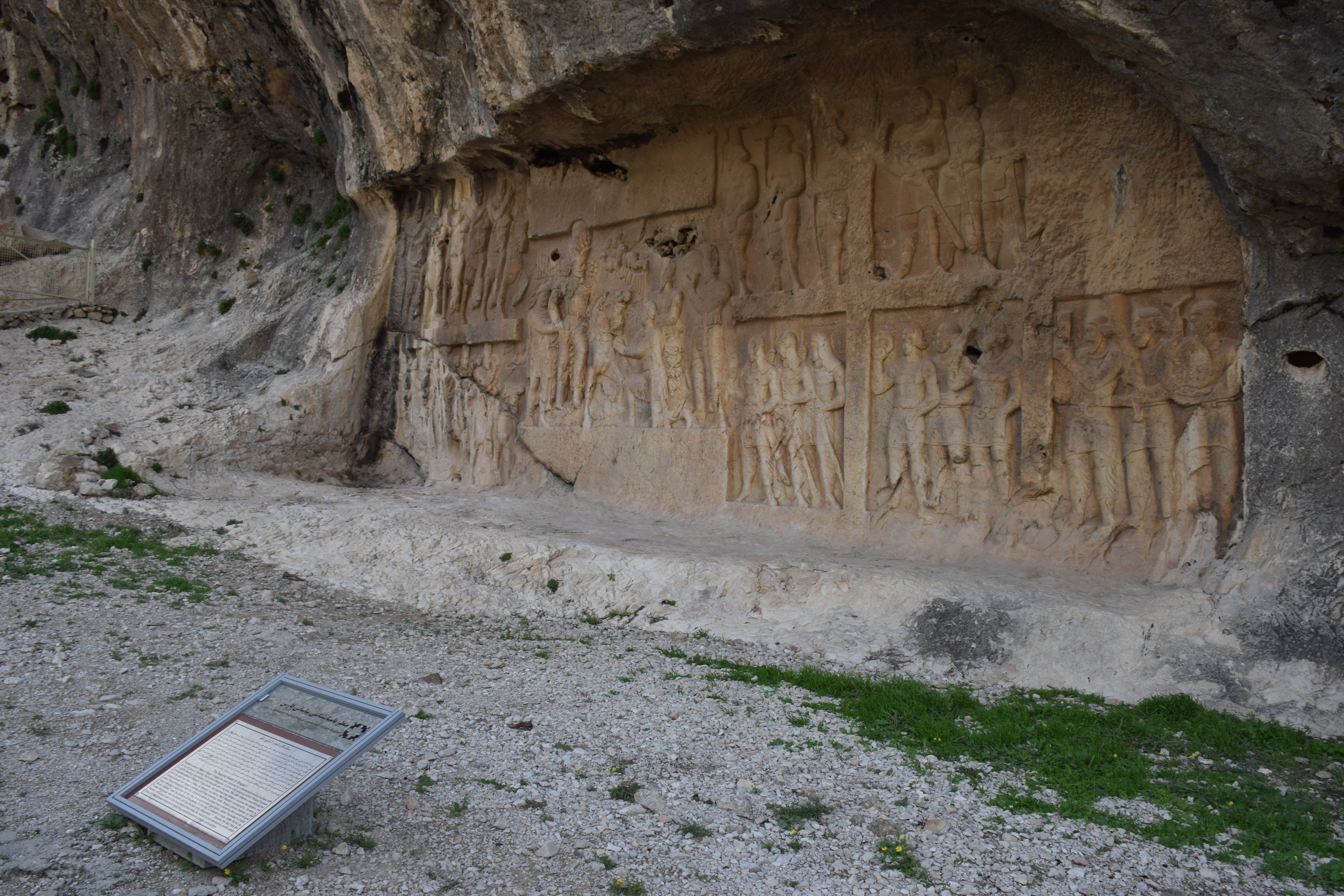
Relief in Tang-e Chogan

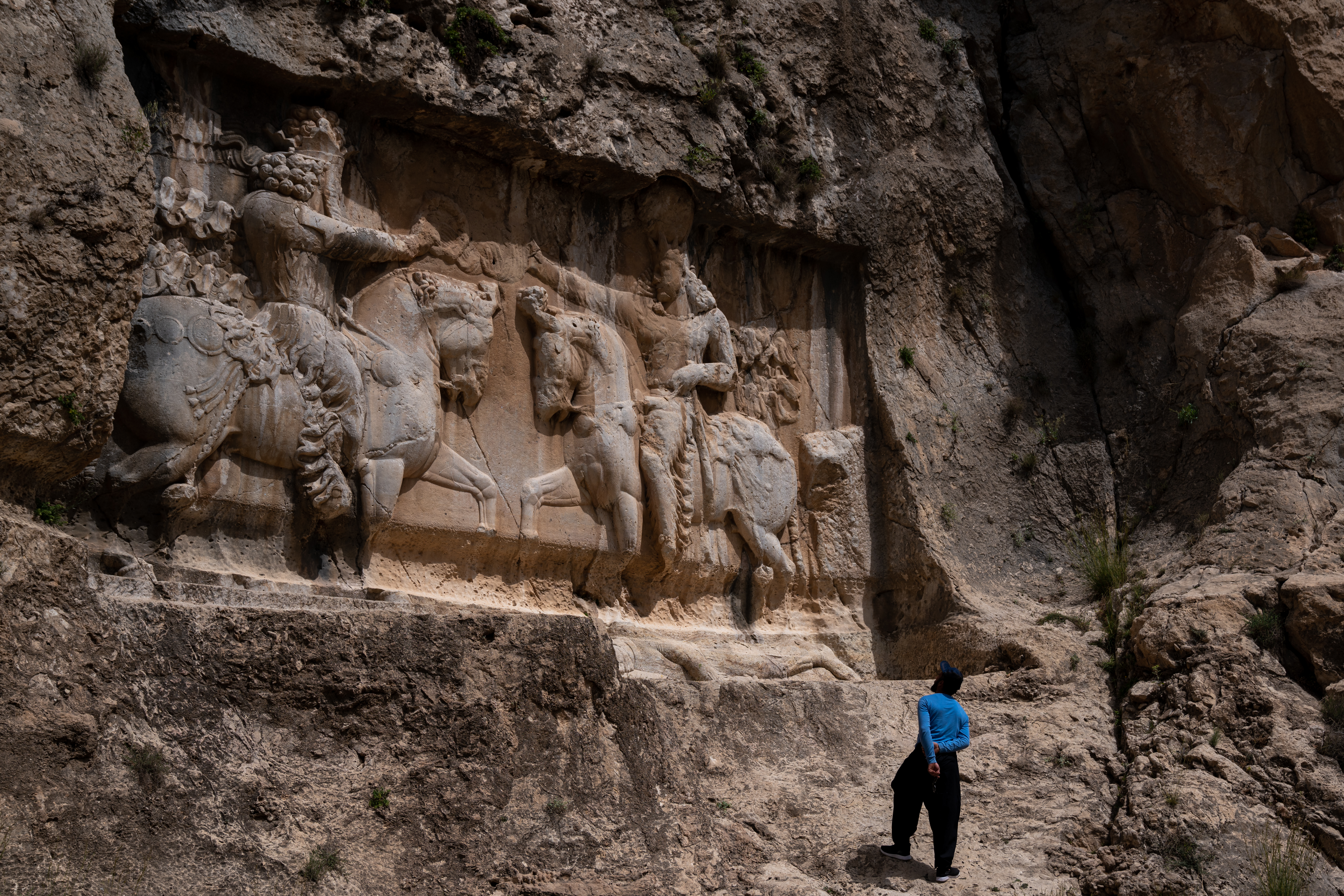
Relief in Tang-e Chogan

=== Kazerun Historical Grand Bazaar ===
The historical grand bazaar of Kazerun is one of the few indoor bazaars in Iran, part of its new building is Safavid and part Qajar. Kazerun Grand Bazaar includes the subcategories of Shah Hamzeh Bazaar, Moein Al-Tojjar Bazaar, Mokhi Bazaar, Felt Makers Bazaar, Gold Sellers Bazaar, Clothing Sellers Bazaar, Shoe Sellers Bazaar, Brothers Bazaar, Coppersmiths Bazaar (Abafath) and several other small Bazaars.

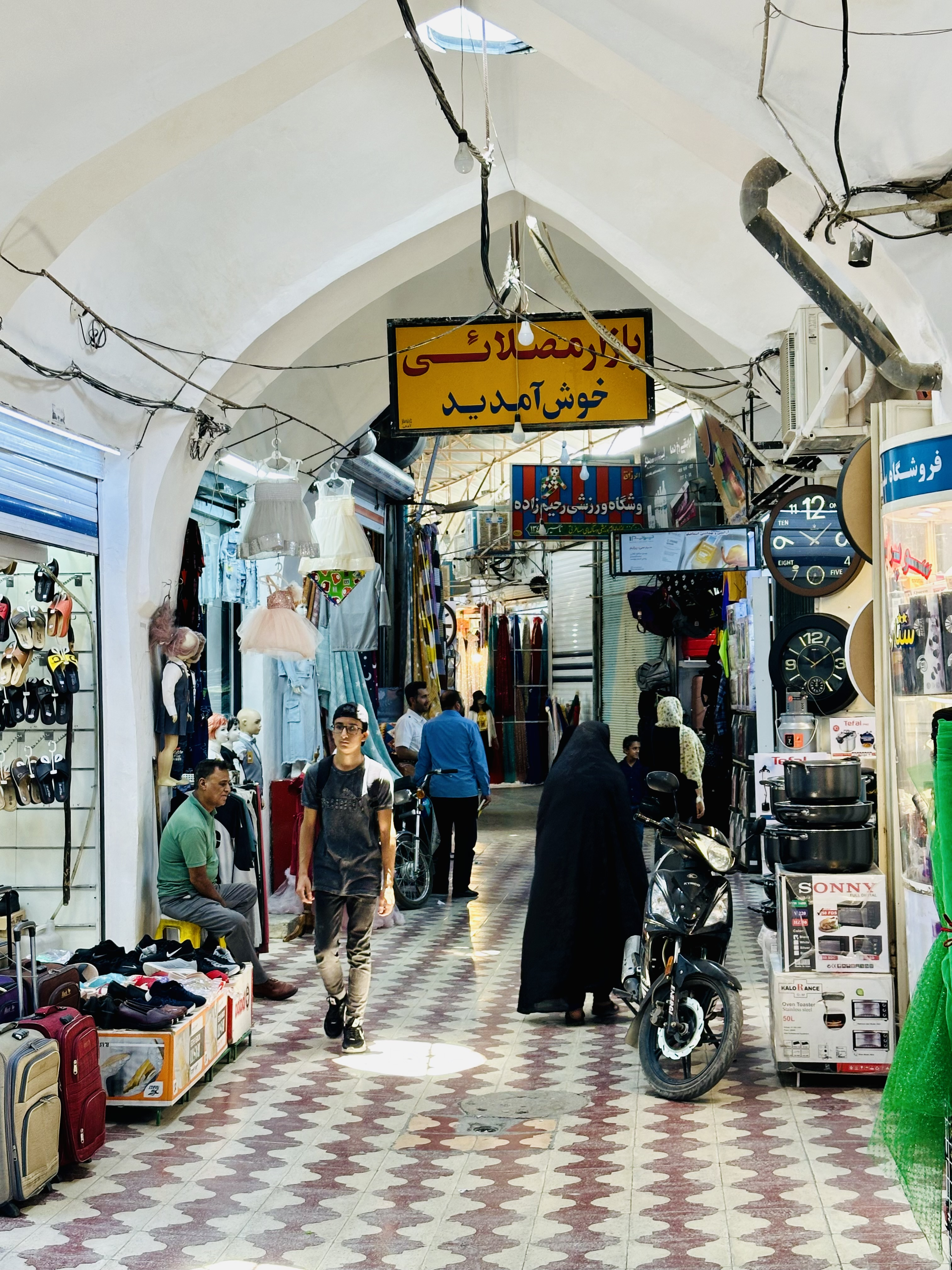
The architecture of the historical bazaar of Kazerun

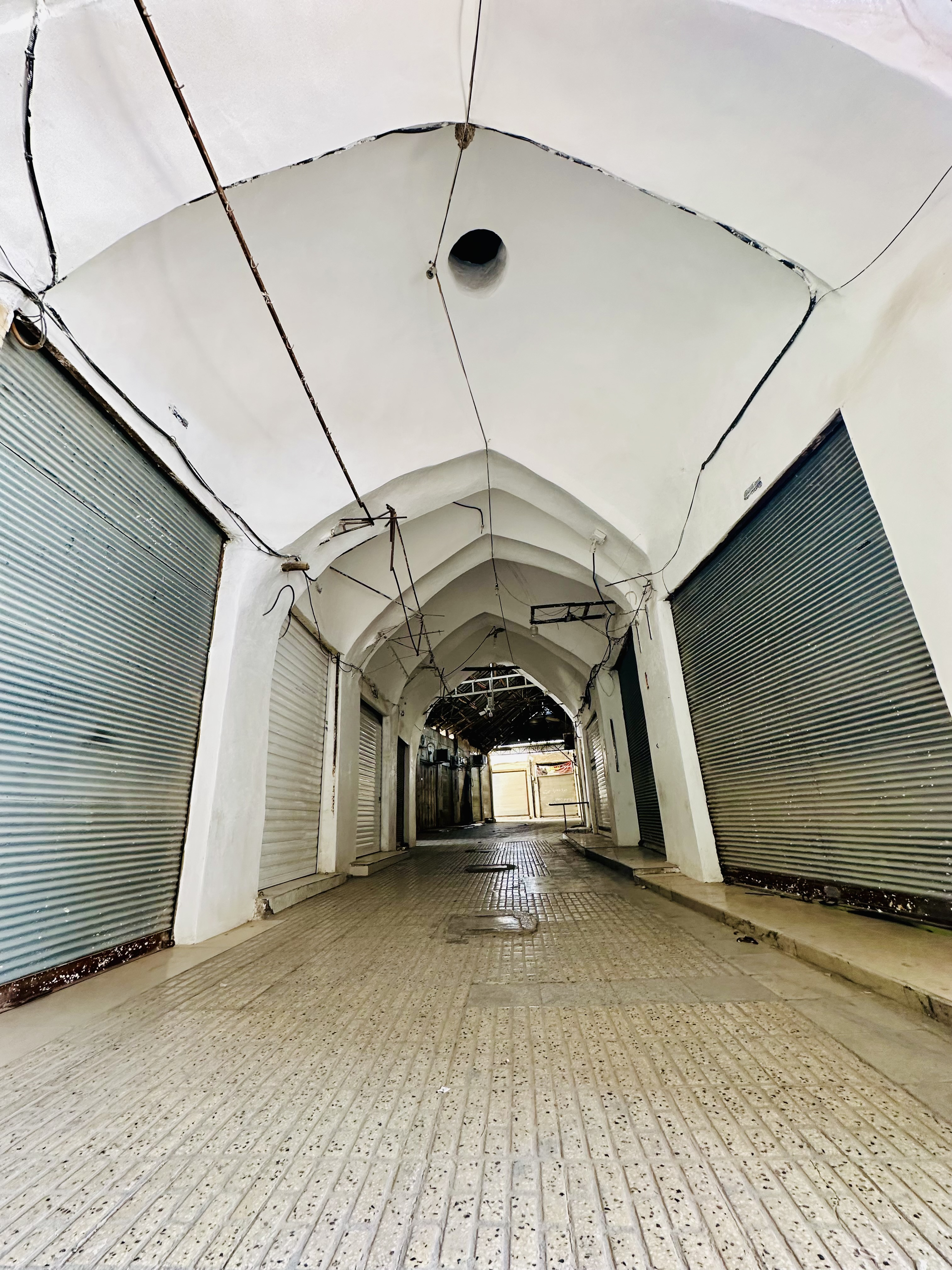
Plaster vaults in Kazerun bazaar

=== Historic District of Kazerun ===
The historic district of Kazerun city is a collection of houses, mosques, baths, archways (Persian: ساباط romanized: Sābāt) and other historic buildings, which mainly belong to the Safavid, Zand dynasty and Qajar periods. According to the latest investigations, more than 420 houses with historical value and 9 Sābāt (archway) have remained in the historic district of Kazerun city, several of which have been registered in the Iran National Heritage List.

The architecture of the historic district of Kazerun is an example of the continuation of Sasanian architecture in combination with Islamic architecture.

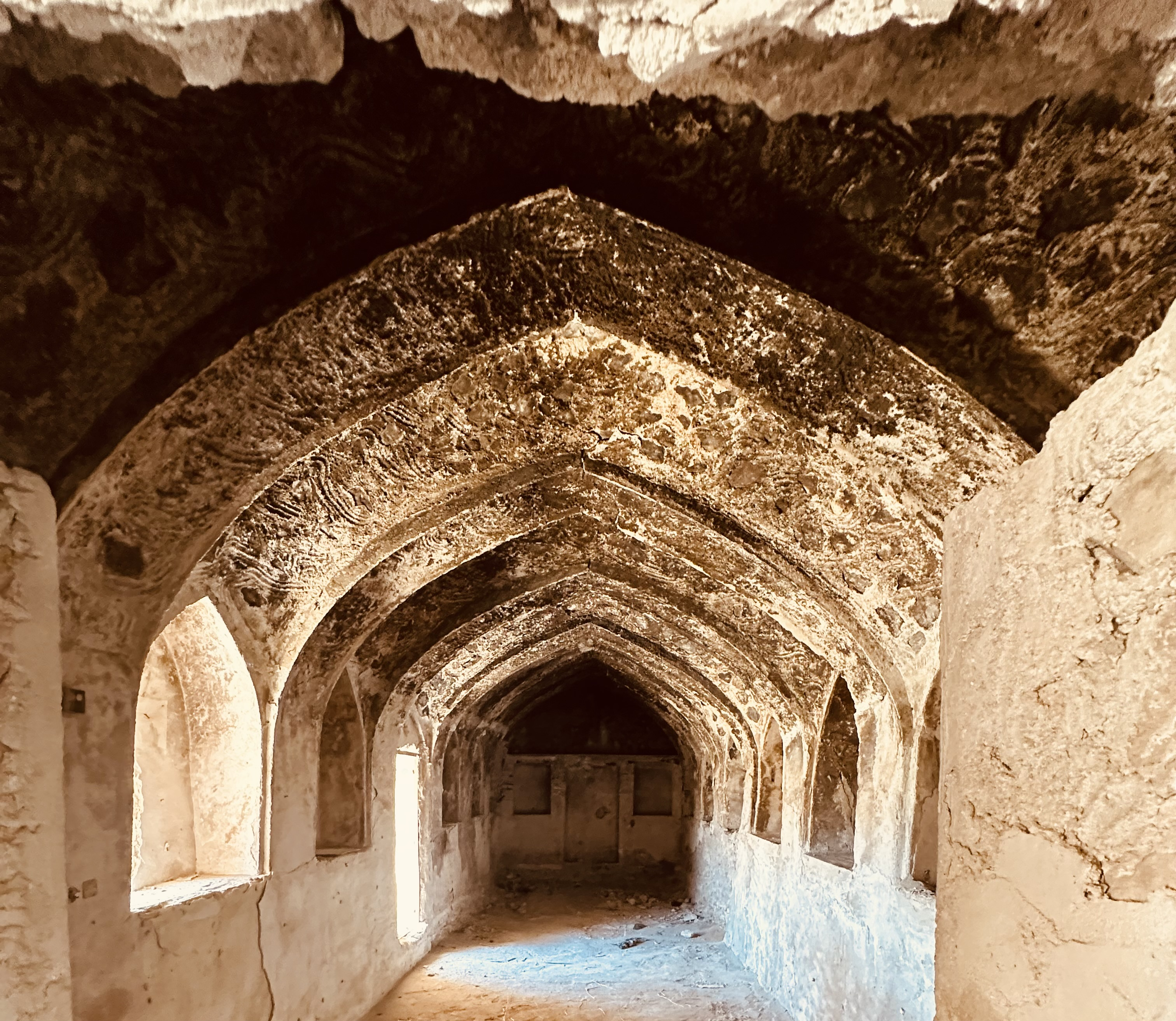
A building built in the Zend dynasty

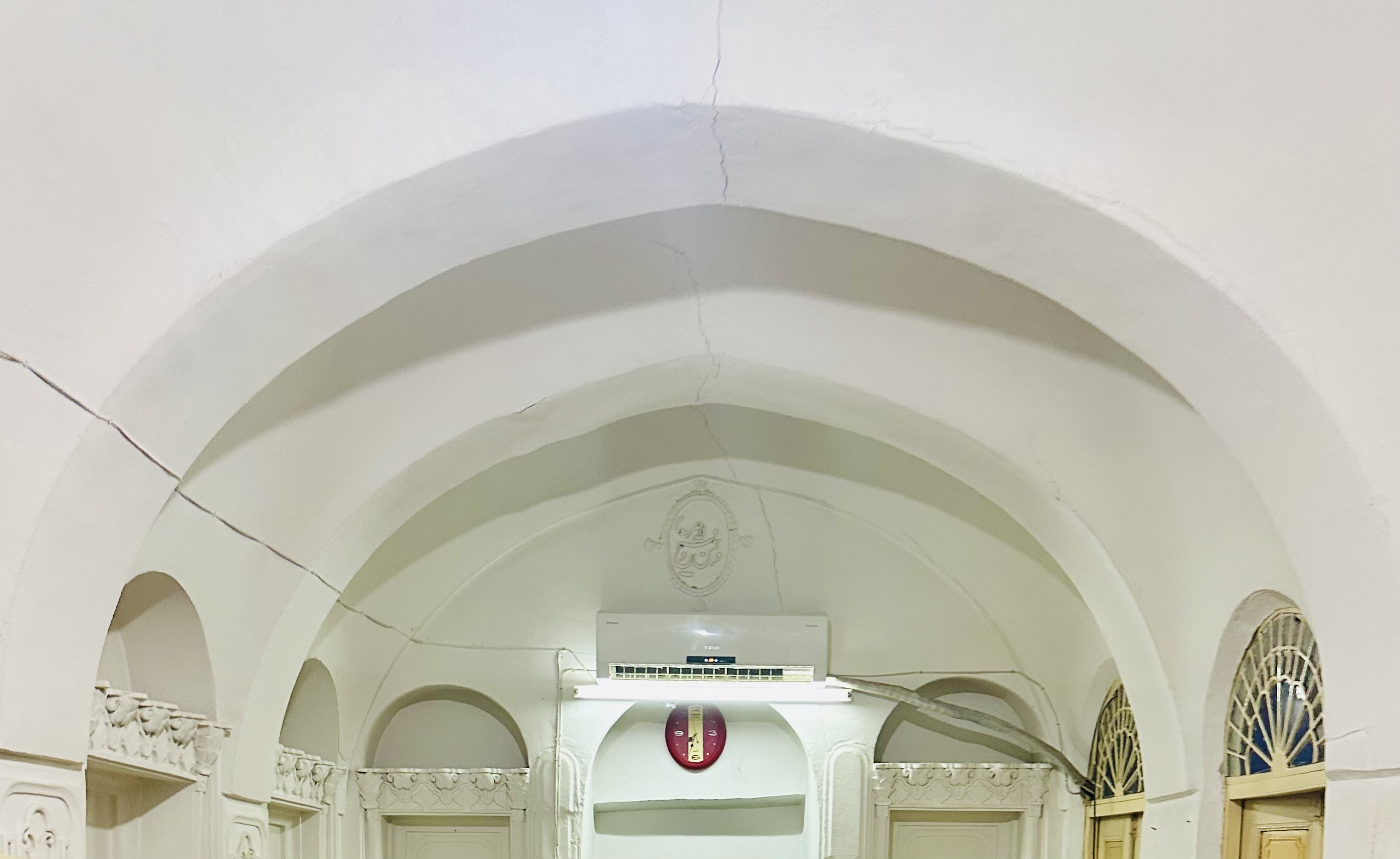
A plaster vault

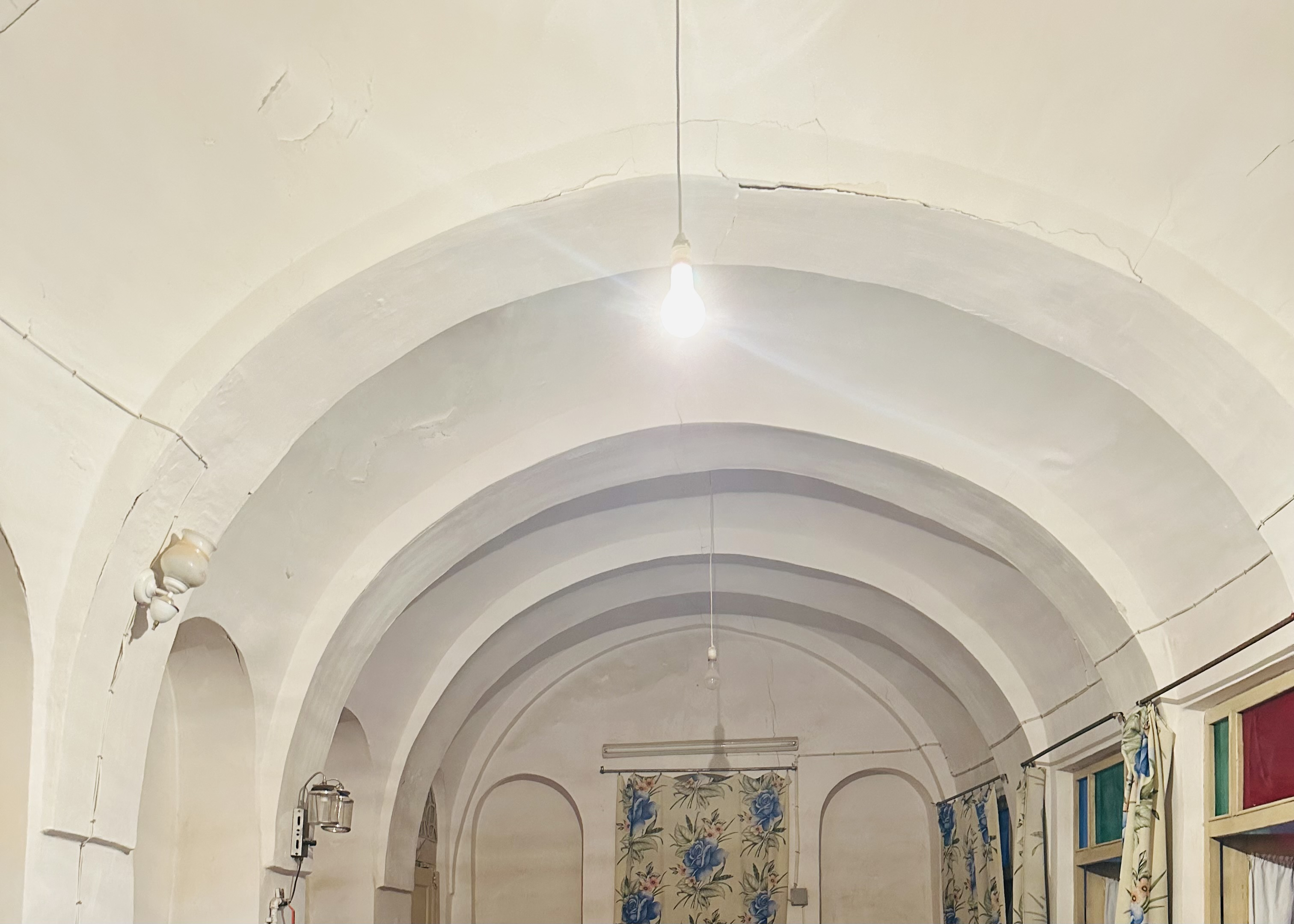
A plaster vault

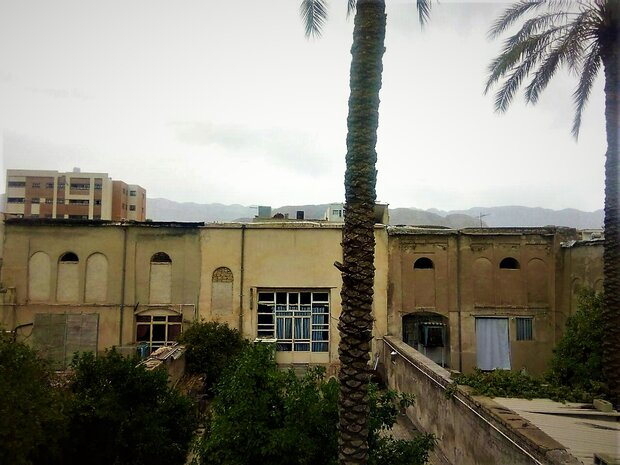
A historical house

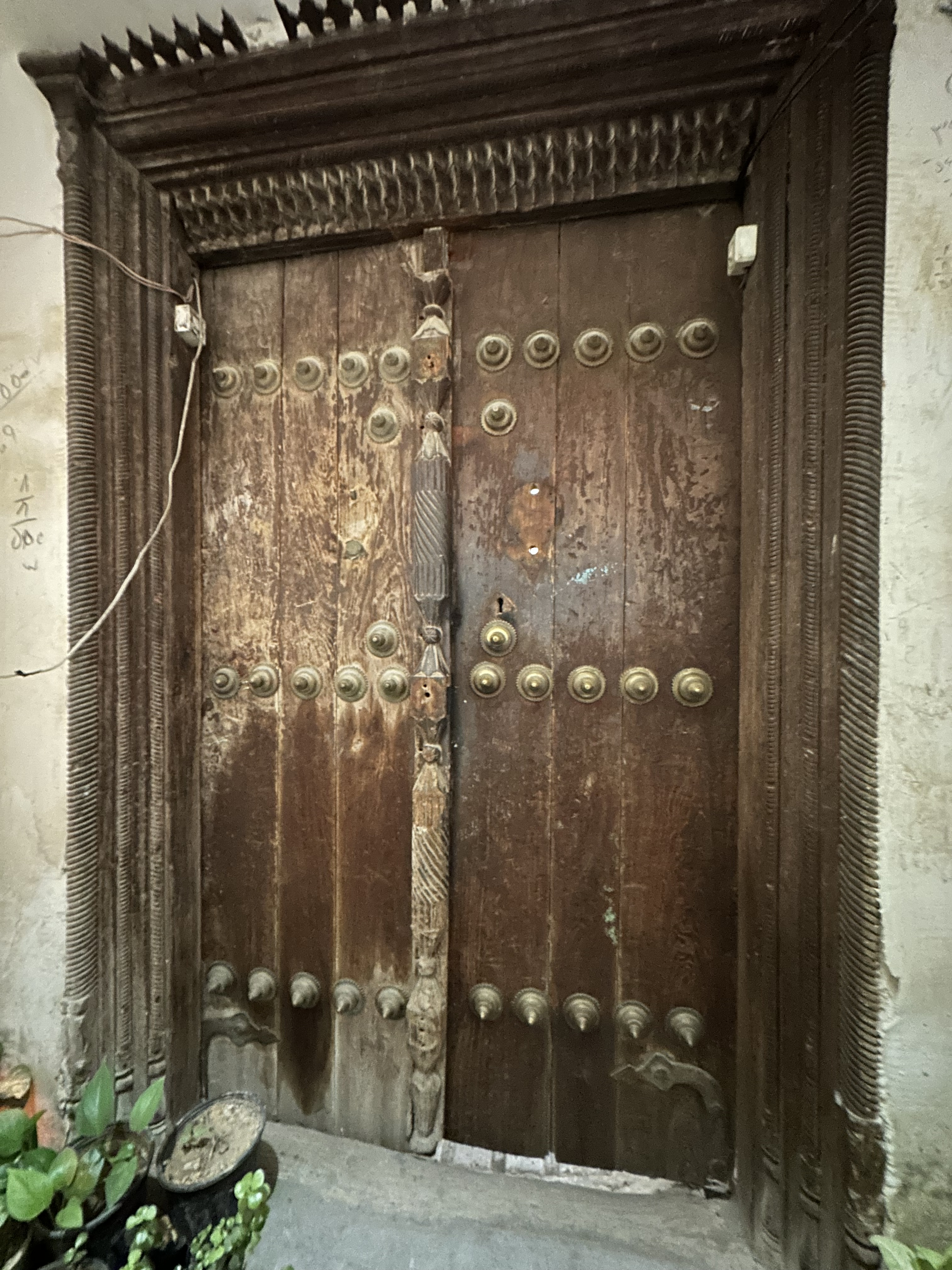
A historical door

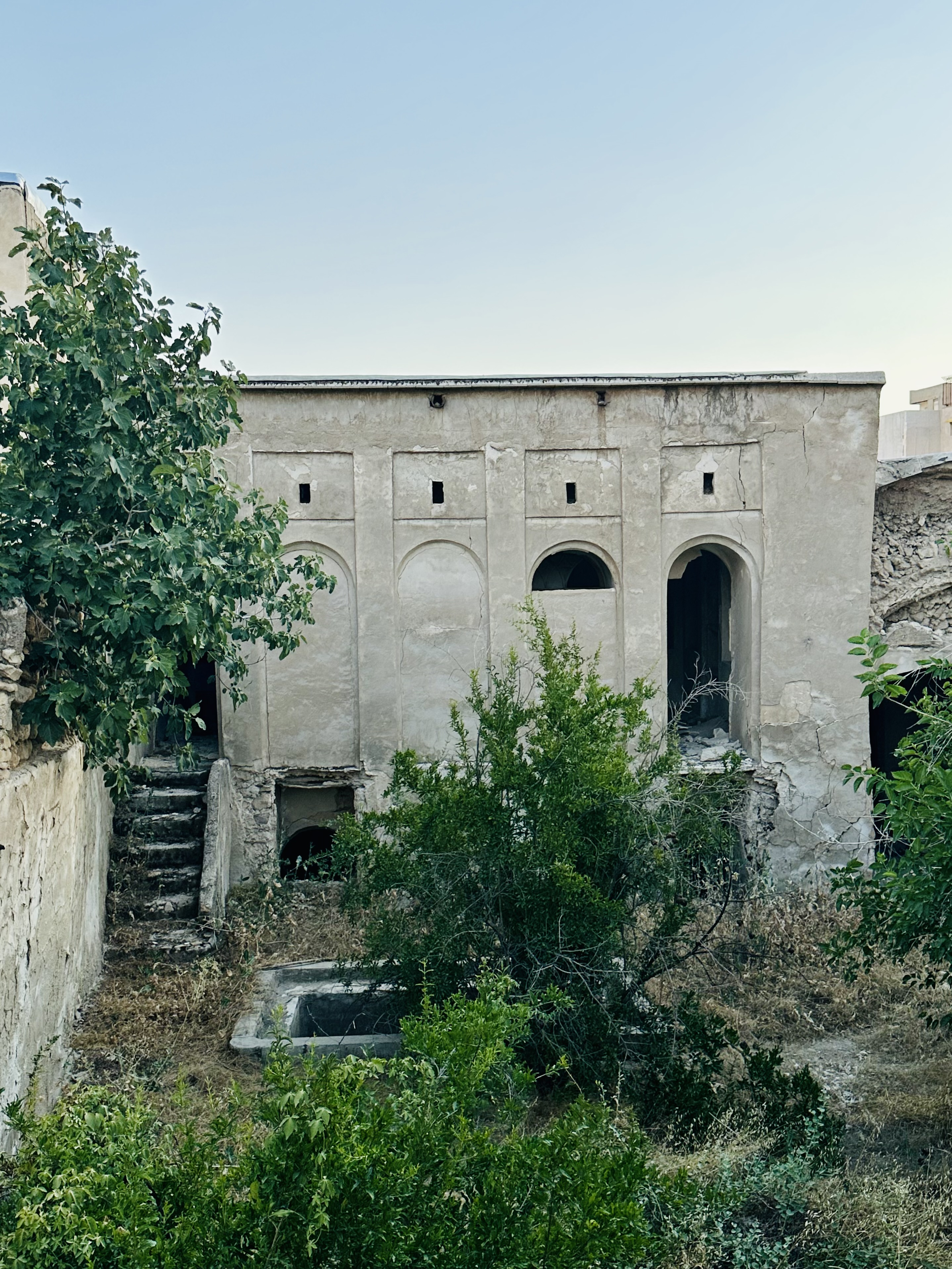
A historical house

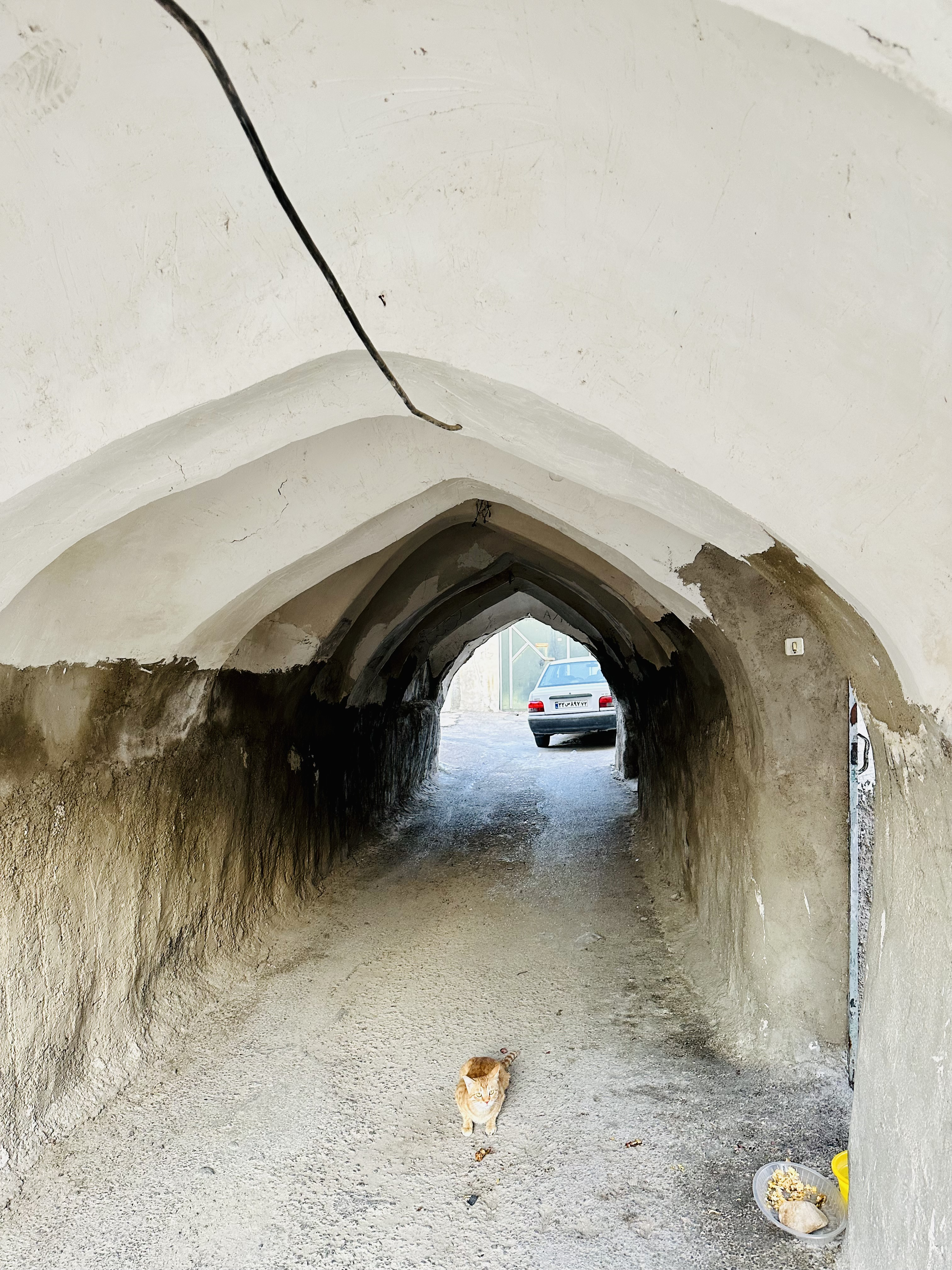
A Sabat (archway)

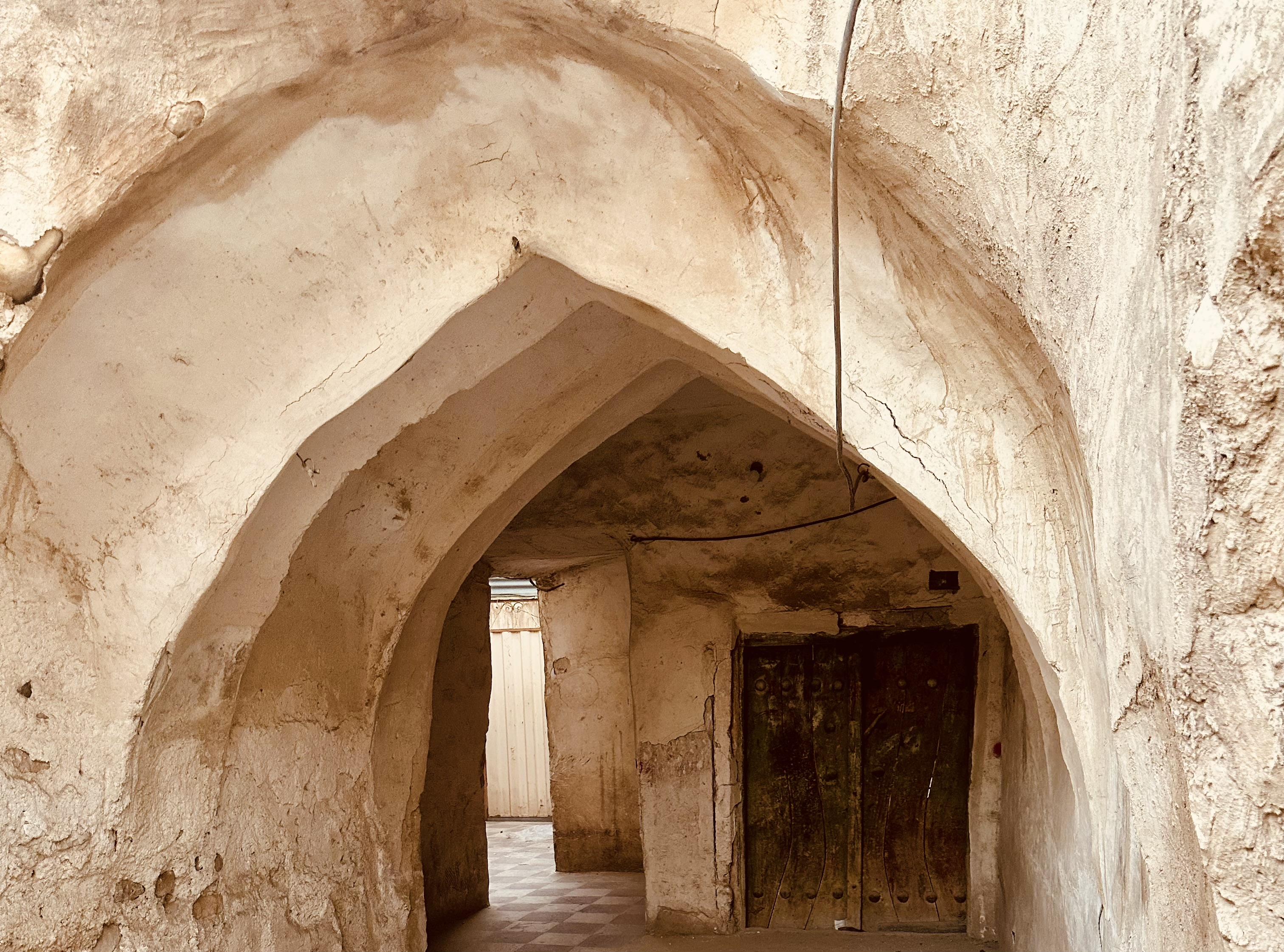
A Sabat (archway)

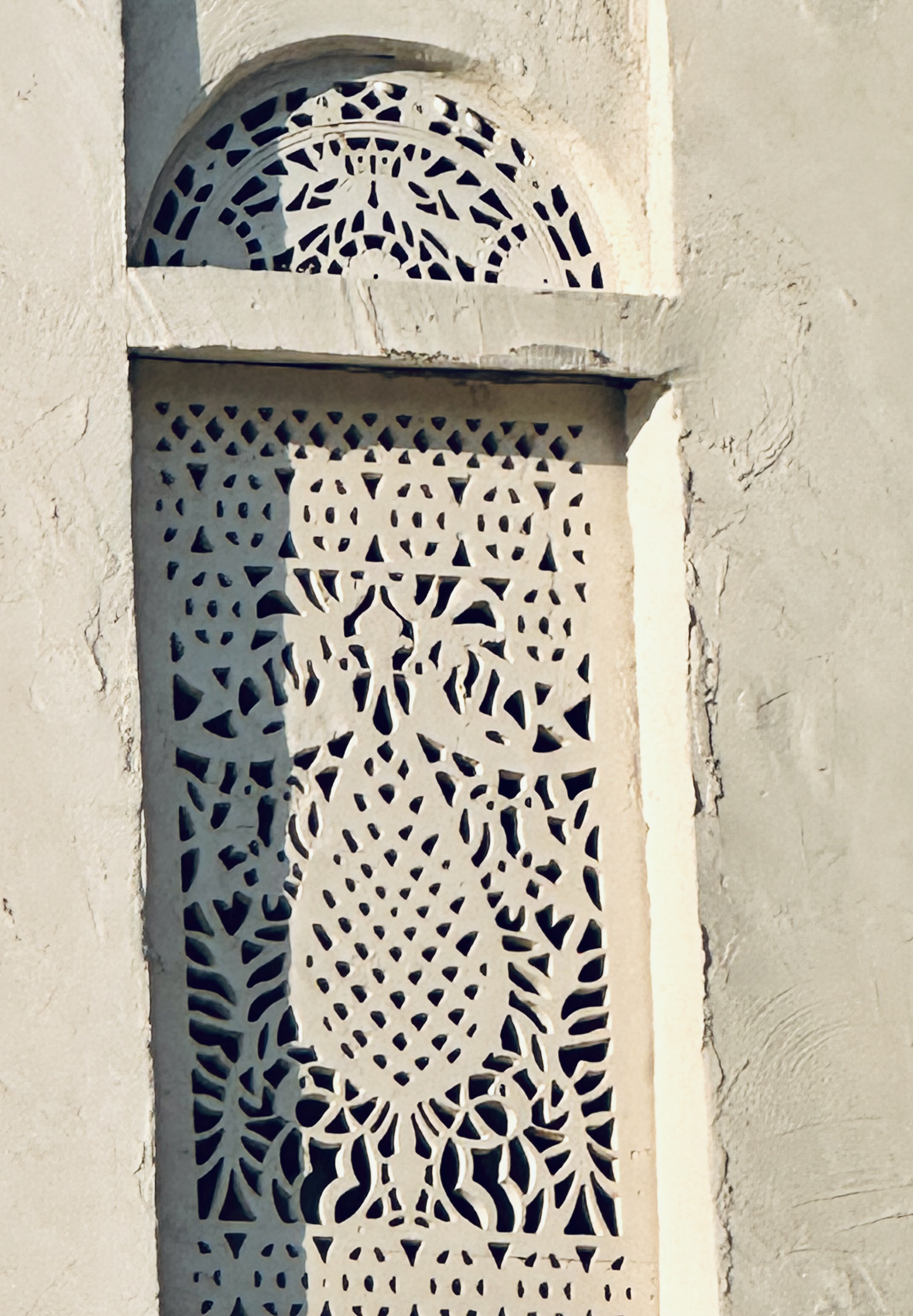
A window with the indigenous architecture of Kazerun

=== Parishan Lake ===
Parishan Lake, with an area of 4300 hectares, was considered the largest fresh water lake in the Middle East until the drought in 2008. As an international wetland and a protected area, this lake was the habitat of all kinds of fish and migratory birds. The most basic project proposed for the restoration of this lake was the transfer of water from the Nargesi dam of Kazerun.

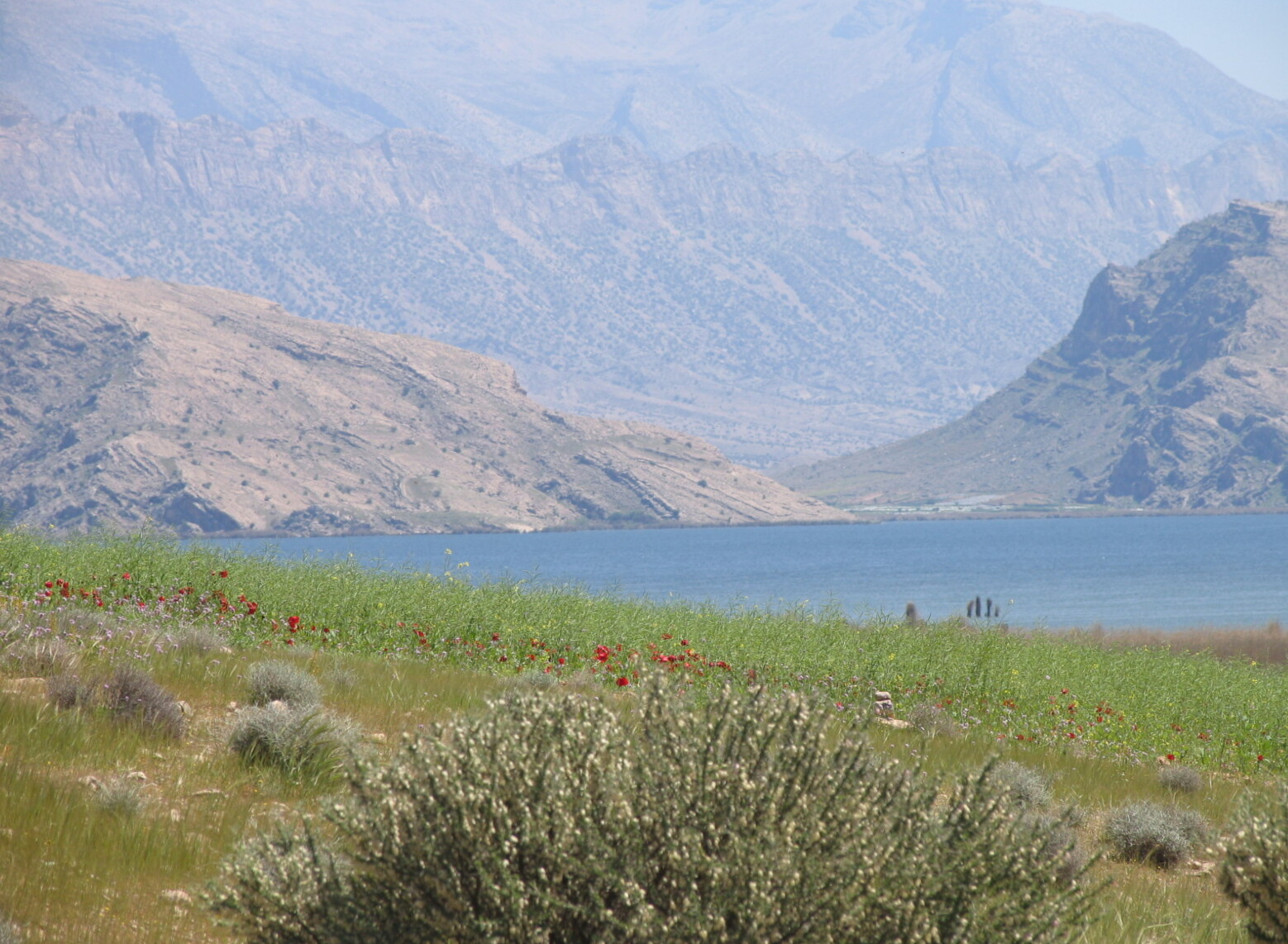
Parishan Lake before the drought

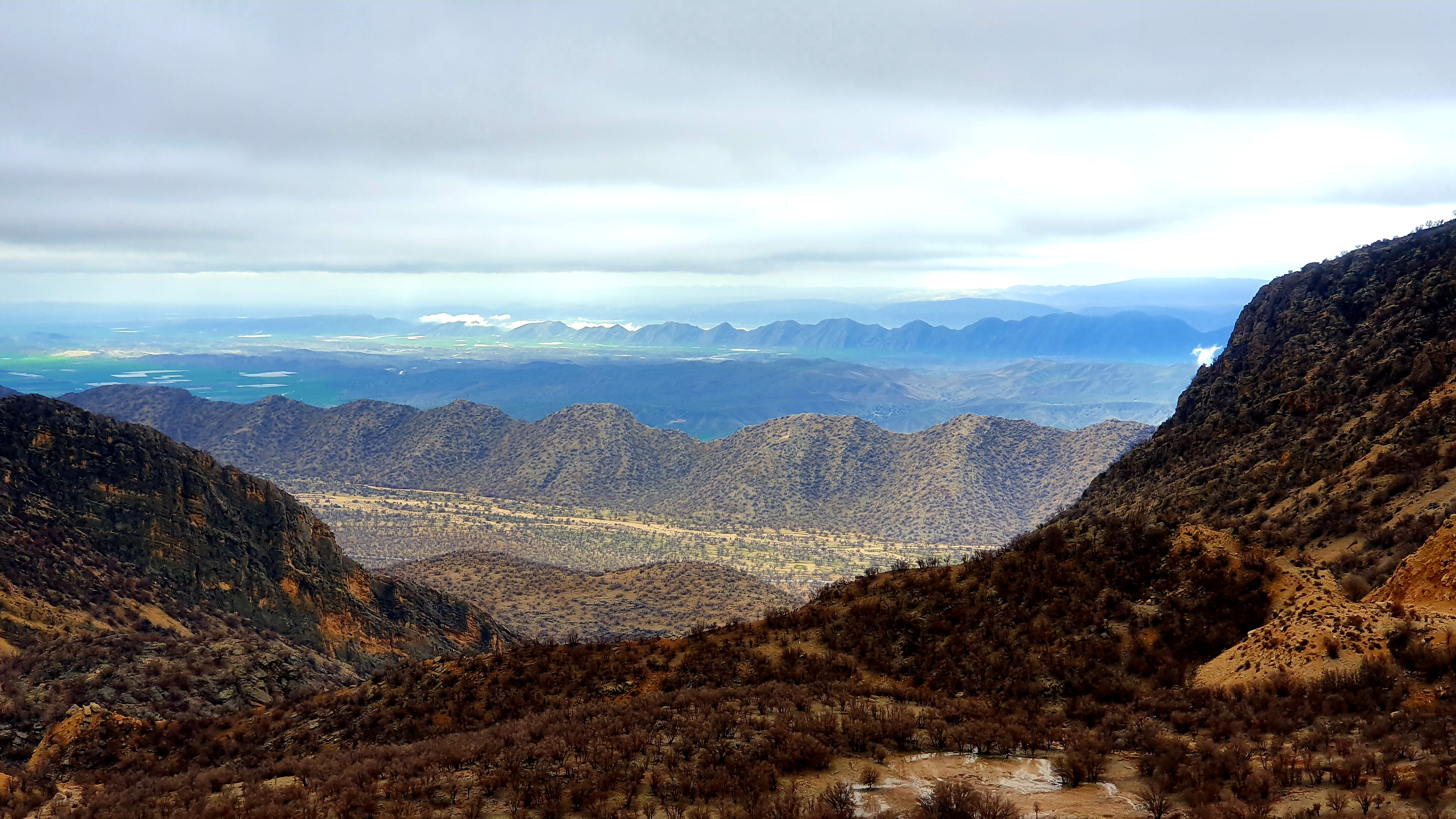
A view of Parishan Lake from the top of the mountains of Dasht-e Barm forest

=== Dasht-e Barm Forest ===
Dasht-e Barm (Barm plain) Forest, with an area of more than 25,000 hectares, is the largest Oak forest in the Middle East, a UNESCO Nature reserve and the habitat of various rare animal species, including the Persian fallow deer, and is considered one of the main tourist attractions in Kazerun.

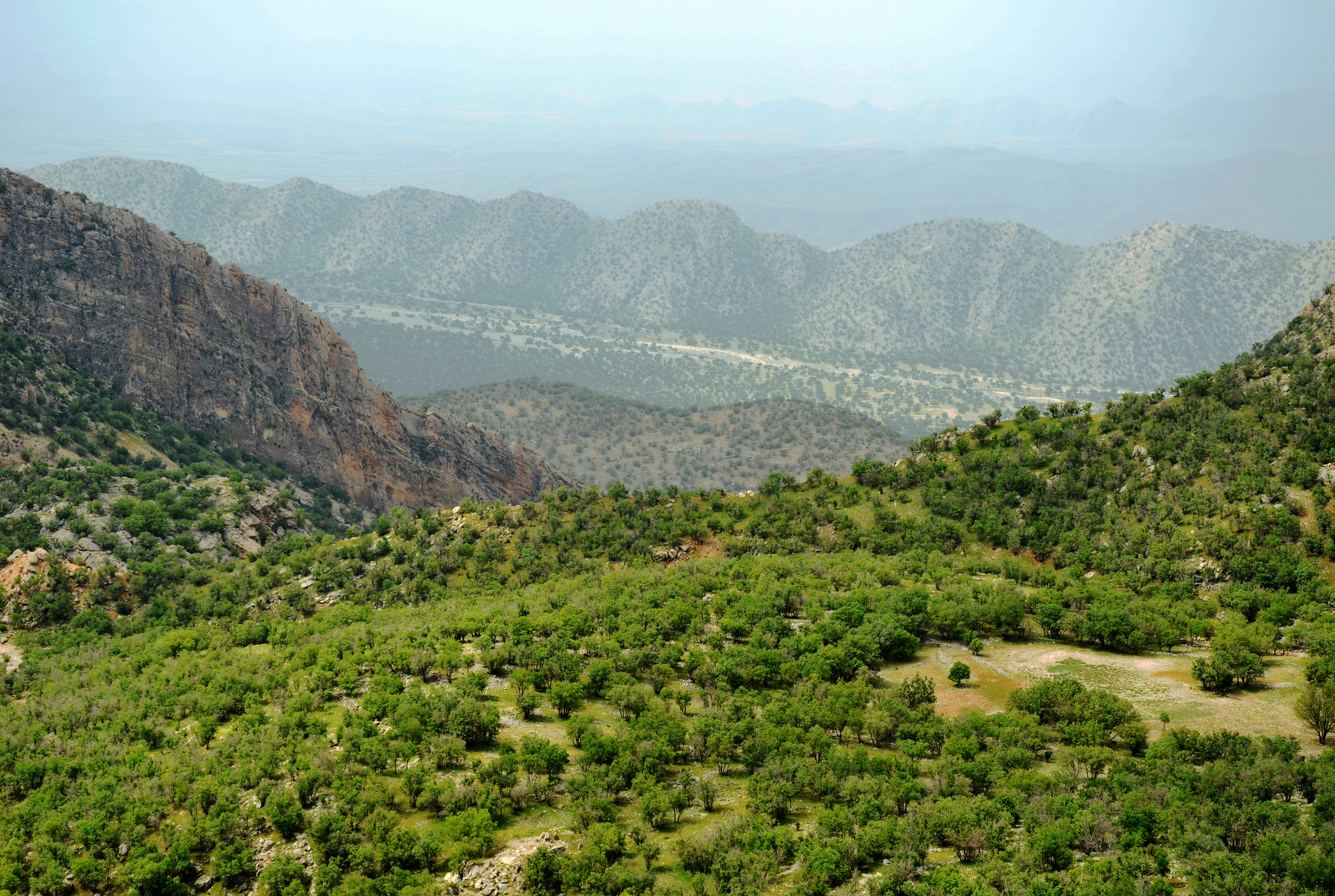
Vegetation of the Dasht-e Barm

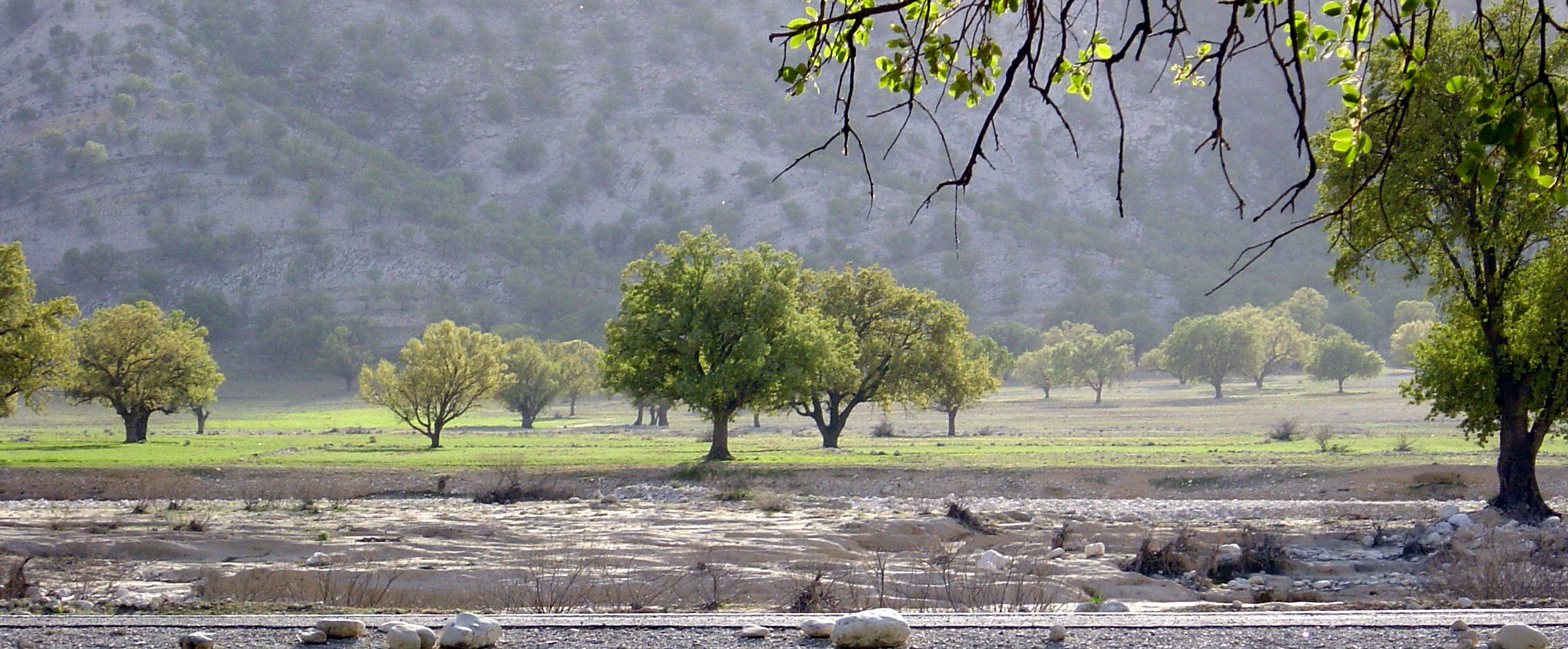
A view of Dasht-e Barm

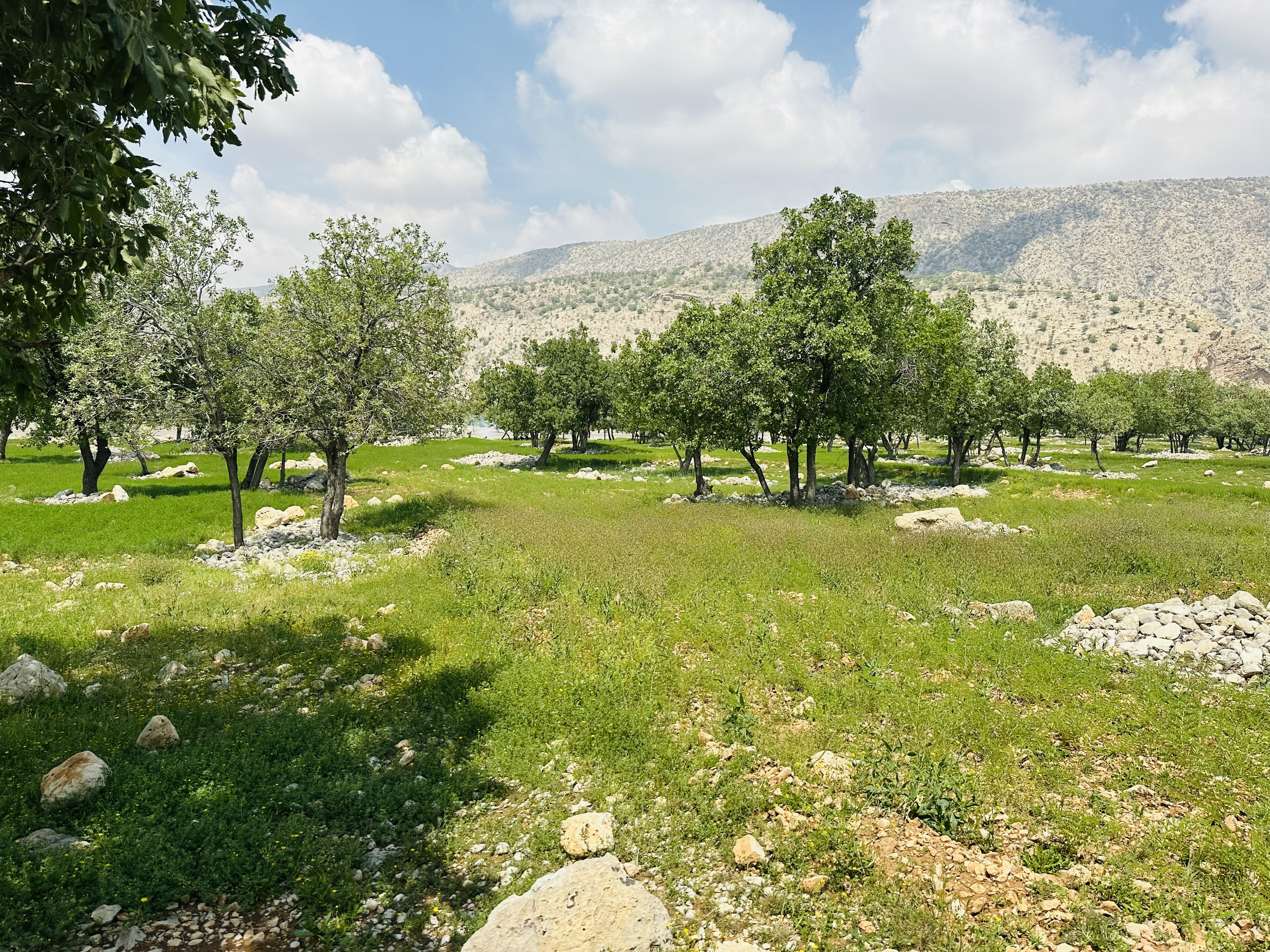
Oak trees and Poppy flowers in Dasht-e Barm

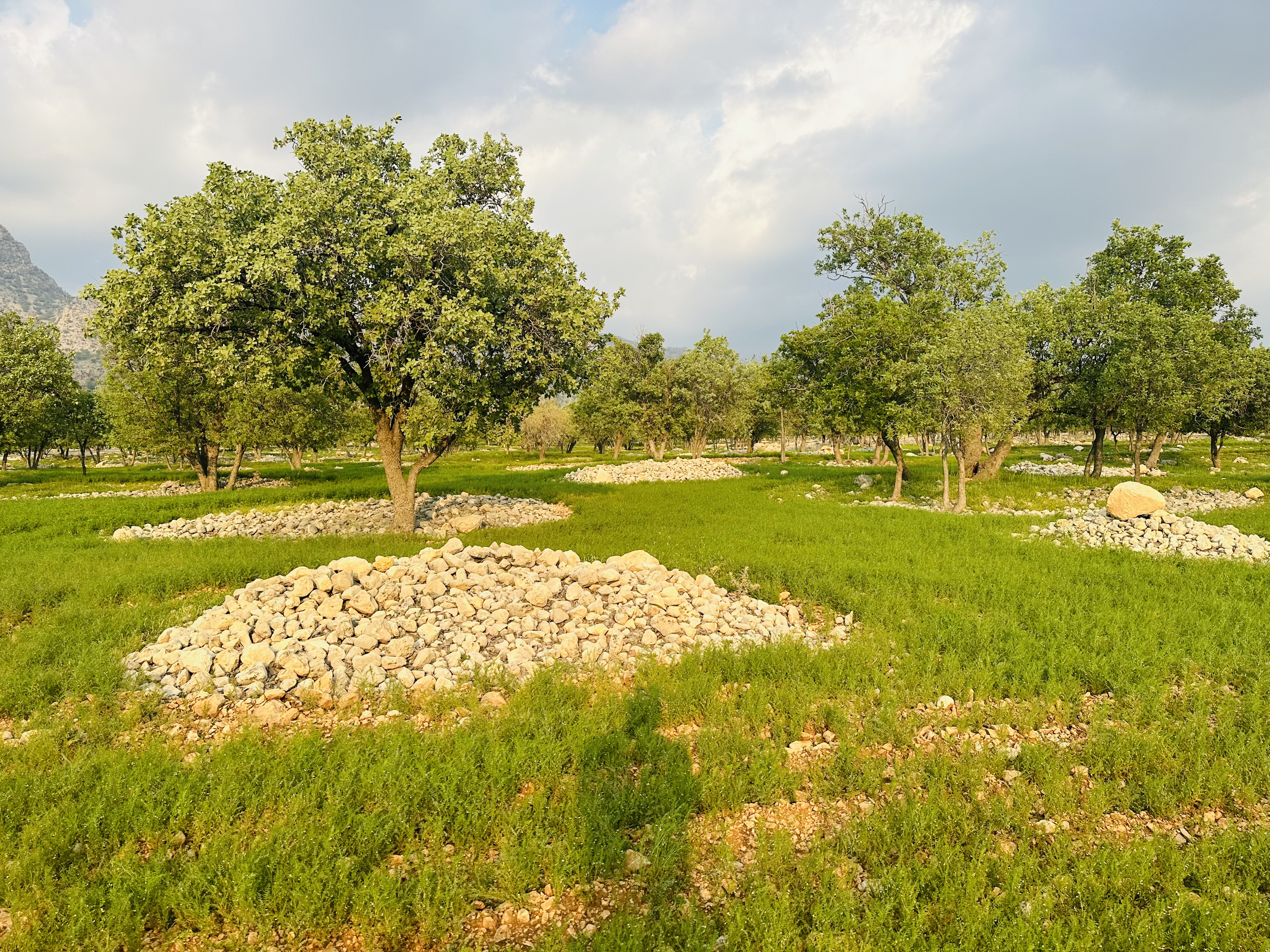
Nature of Dasht-e Barm

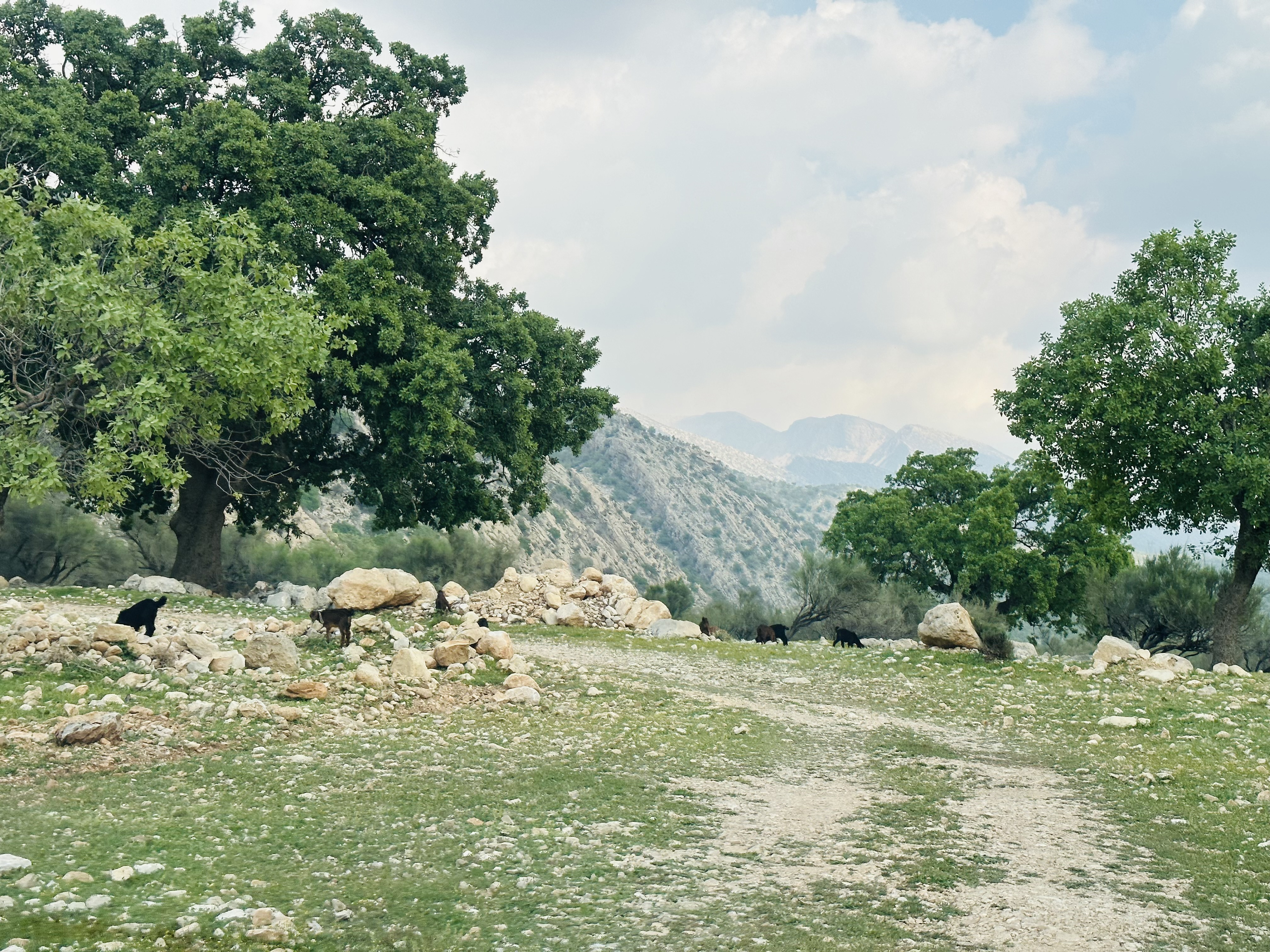
A local access road in Dasht-e Barm

=== Daffodil farms of Kazerun ===
Daffodil farms of Kazerun (Persian: نرگس‌زار کازرون romanized: Nargeszăr-e Kāzerun), with an area of 140 hectares, is the largest natural narcissus plain in Iran and is known as the home of narcissus in Iran. Every year in January and February, the narcissus flower festival is held in this narcissus garden.

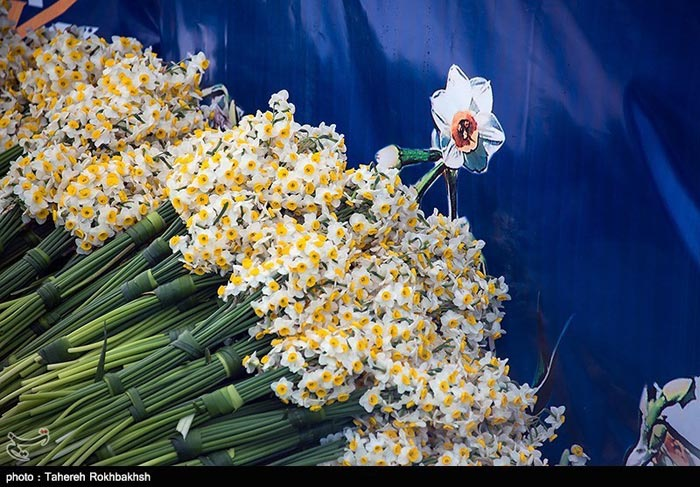
Narcissus of Kazerun

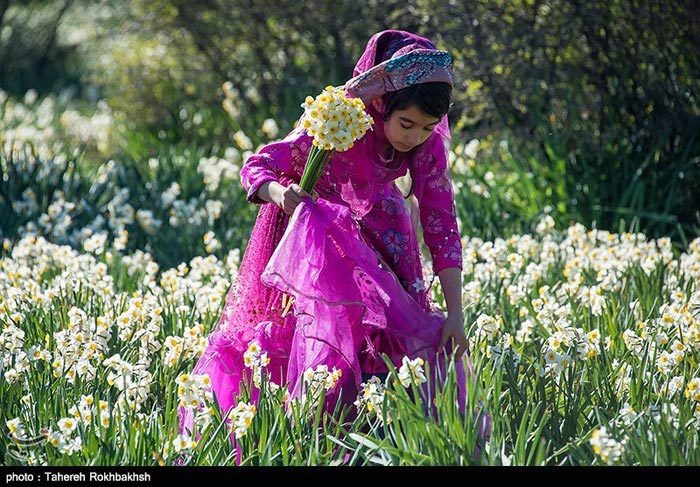
Narcissus plain of Kazerun

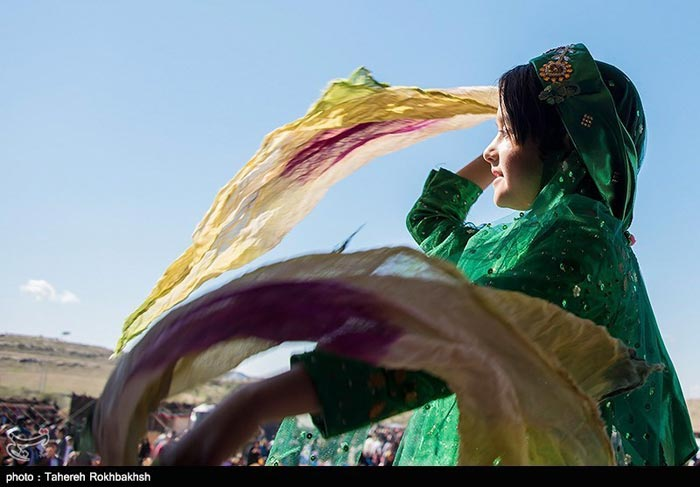
Narcissus flower festival in Kazerun

=== Imamzadeh Seyed Hossein Shrine ===
The mausoleum of Imamzade Seyyed Hossein, the great-grandson of the fourth Imam Shia Islam, is one of the most prominent religious shrines in the south of the country.

=== Nazar garden ===
Nazar Garden is one of the 300-year-old historical gardens of Kazerun, which was built by Khajeh Ali Qoli Khan Afshar of Kazerun, the ruler of Kazerun during the Afsharid period in this city.

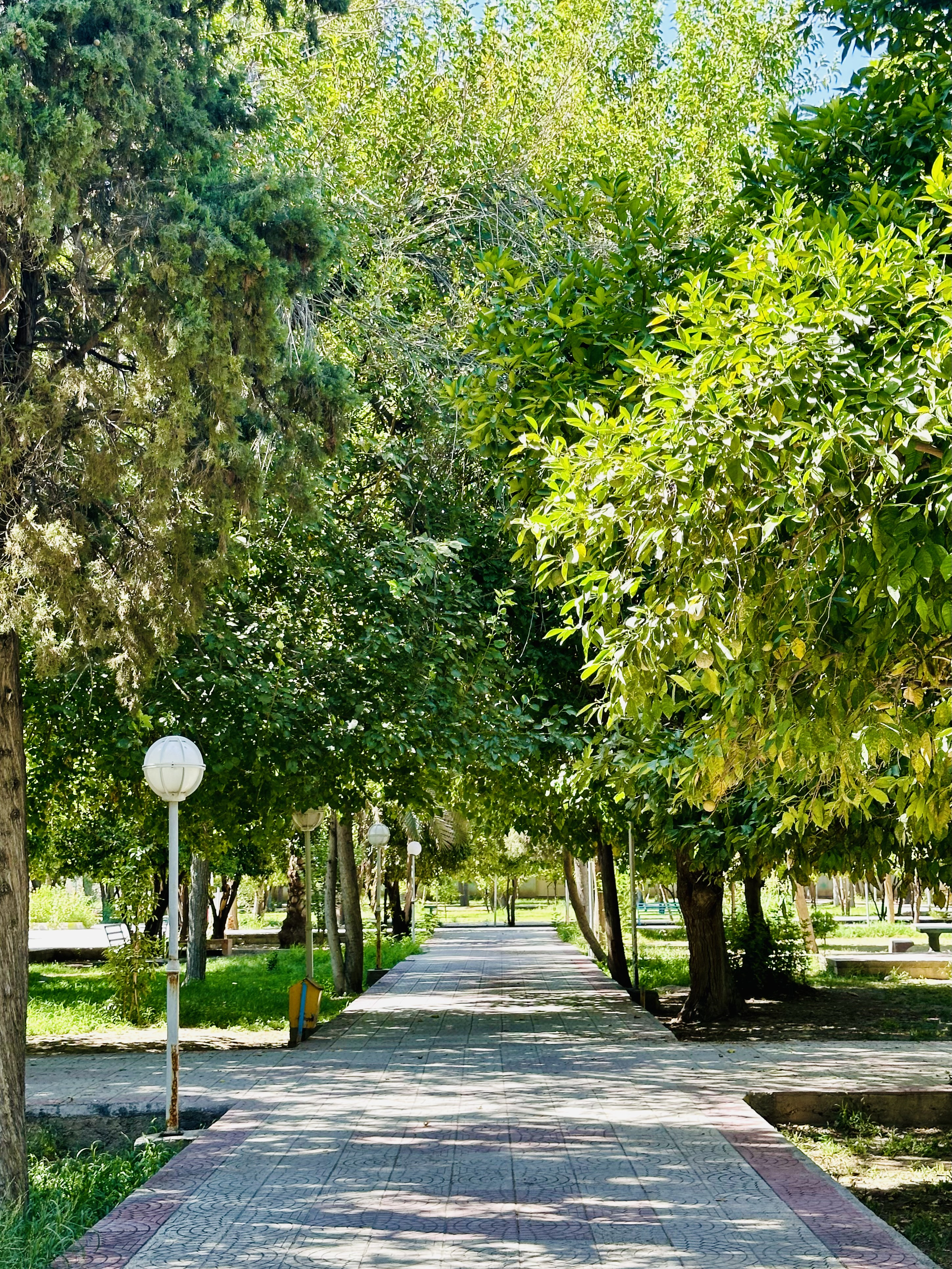
Nazar Garden

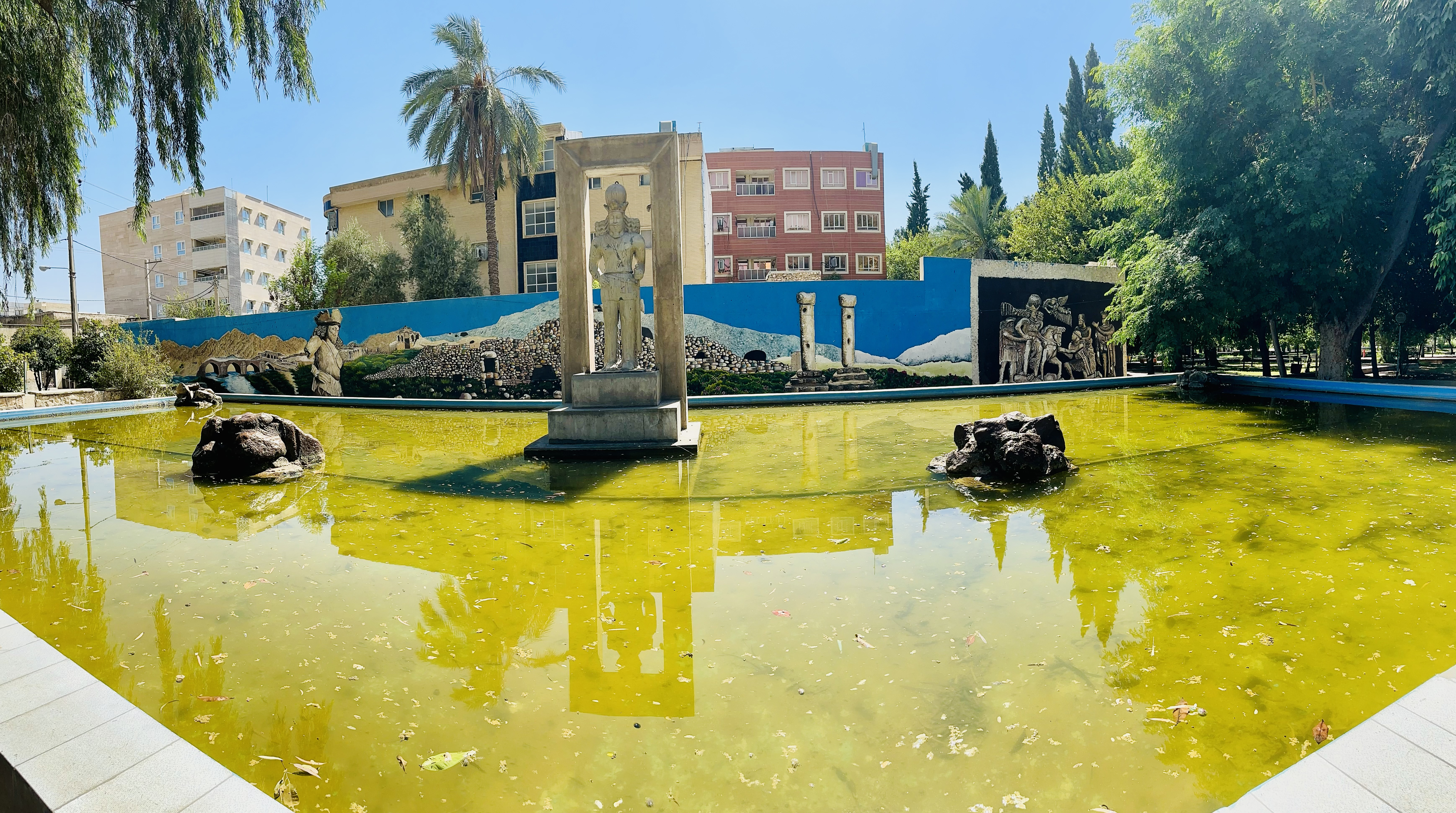
Statue of Shapur I, the Sasanian King in Nazar Garden

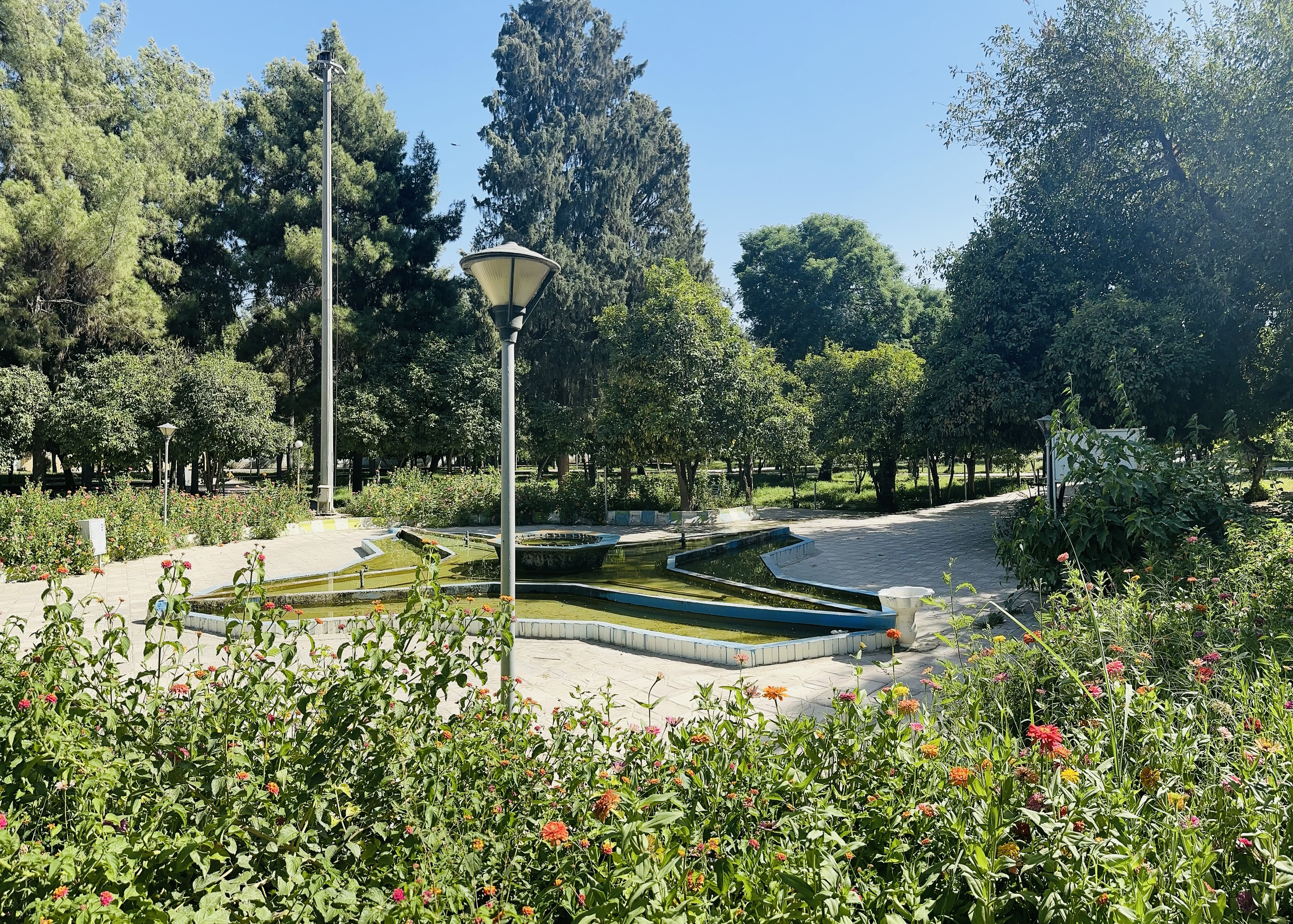
Nazar Garden

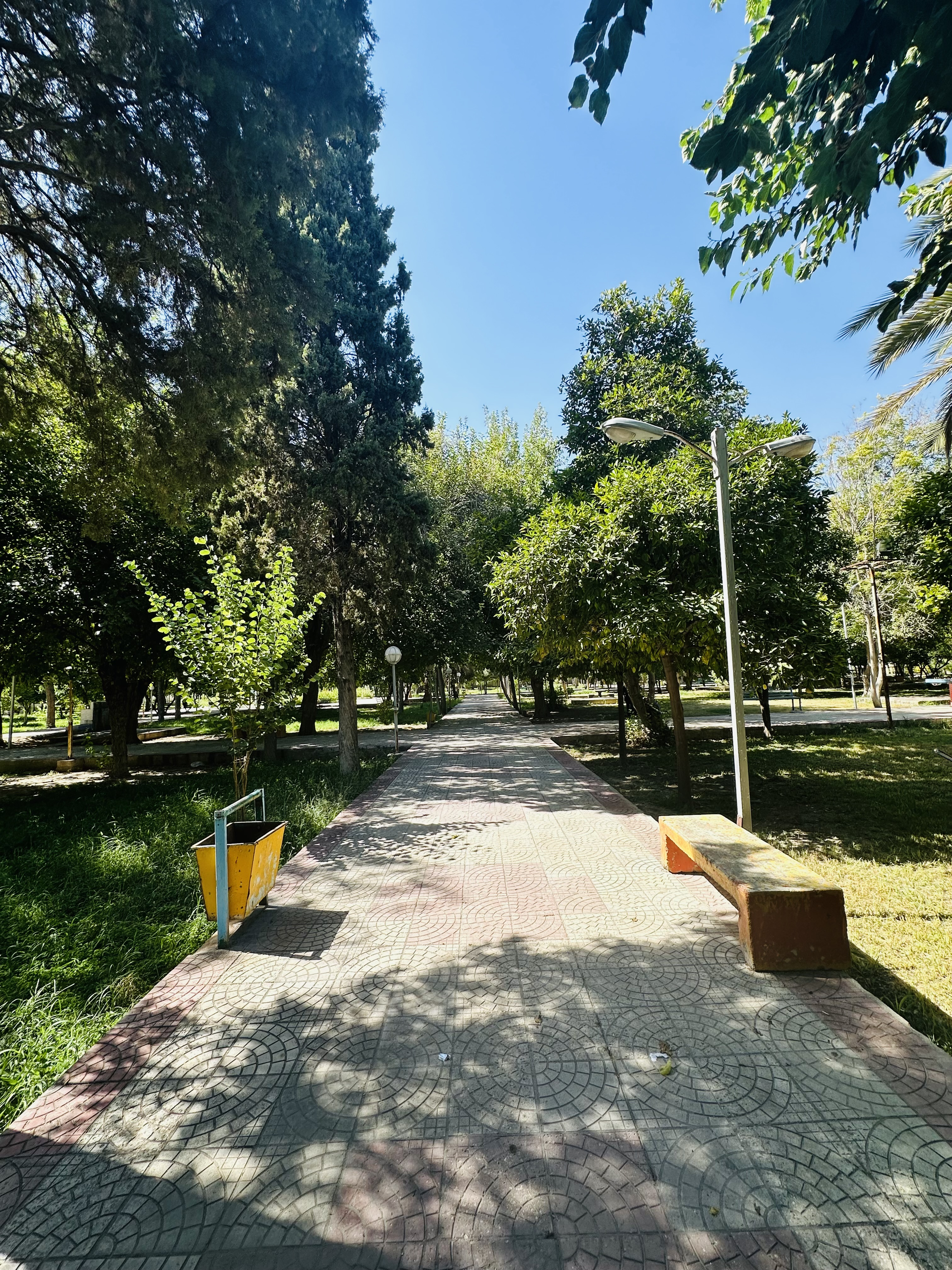
Nazar Garden

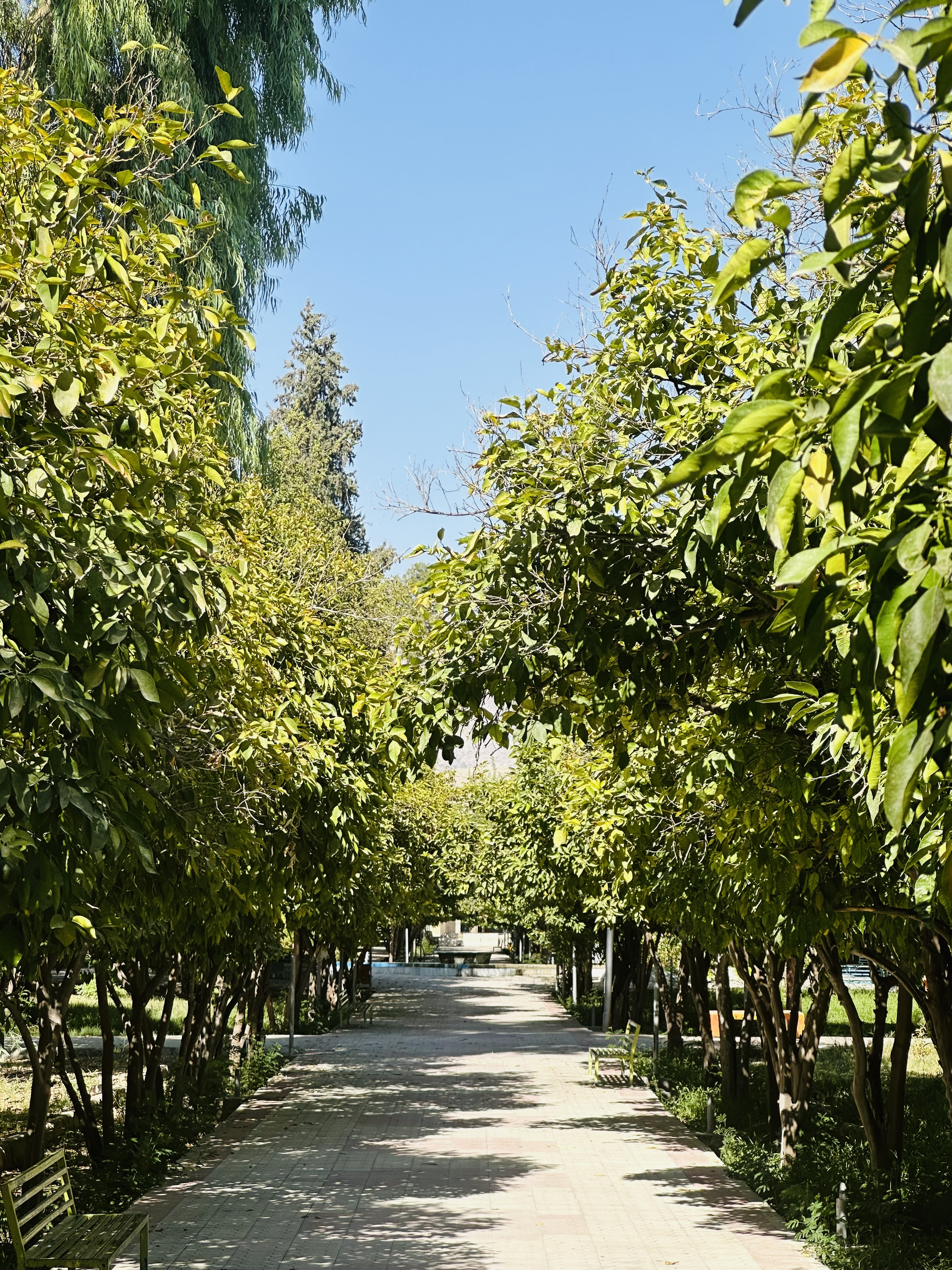
Nazar Garden

=== Tikab valley ===
Tikab valley (Persian: تنگ تیکاب romanized: Tang-e Tikāb) is considered a historical and natural resort. The caves in this mountain park were among the first settlements of early humans around 18 thousand years BC. There are statues of native animals of the Arjan and Parishan Protected Area in this park.

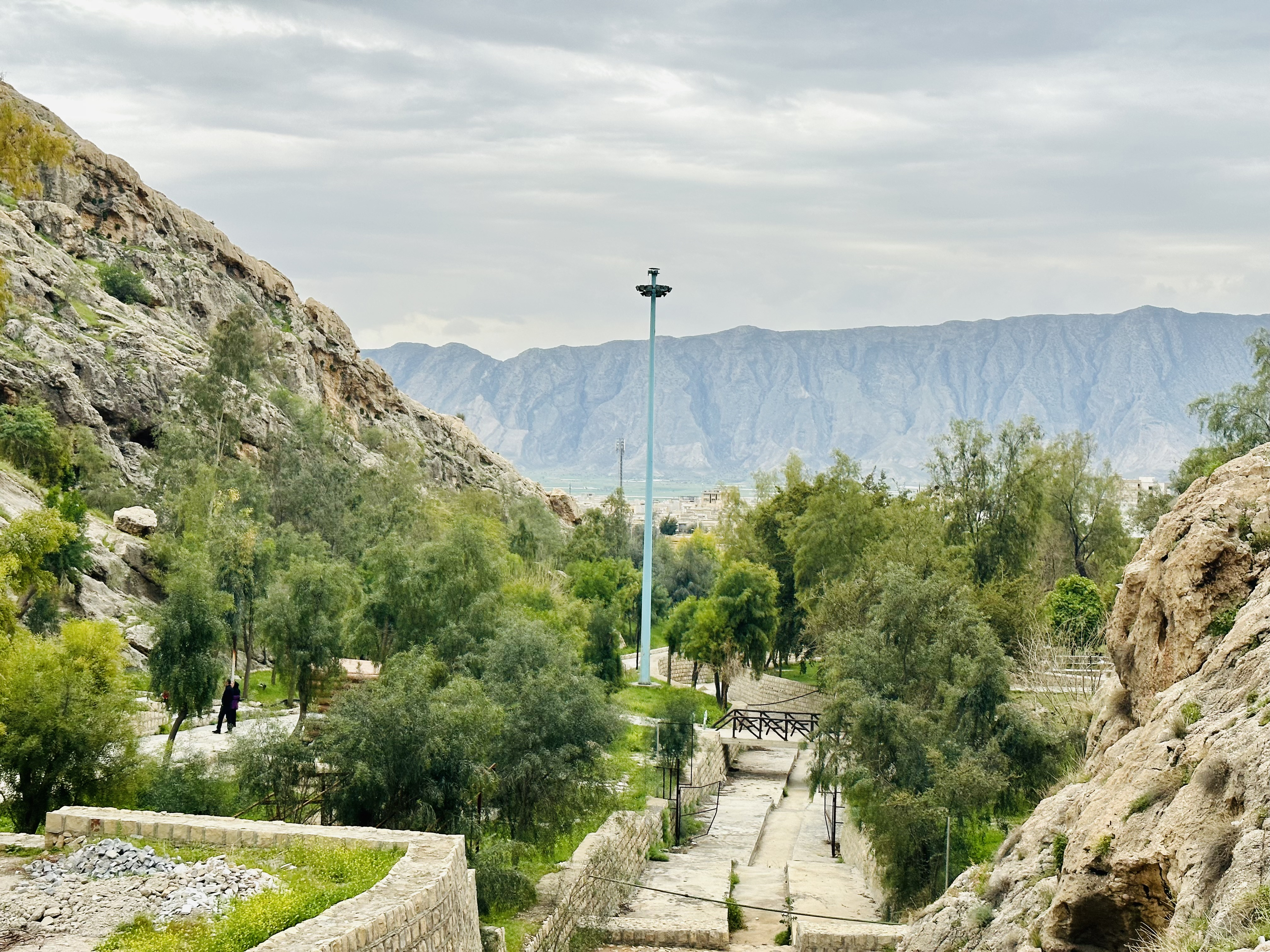
A view of Tang-e Tikab

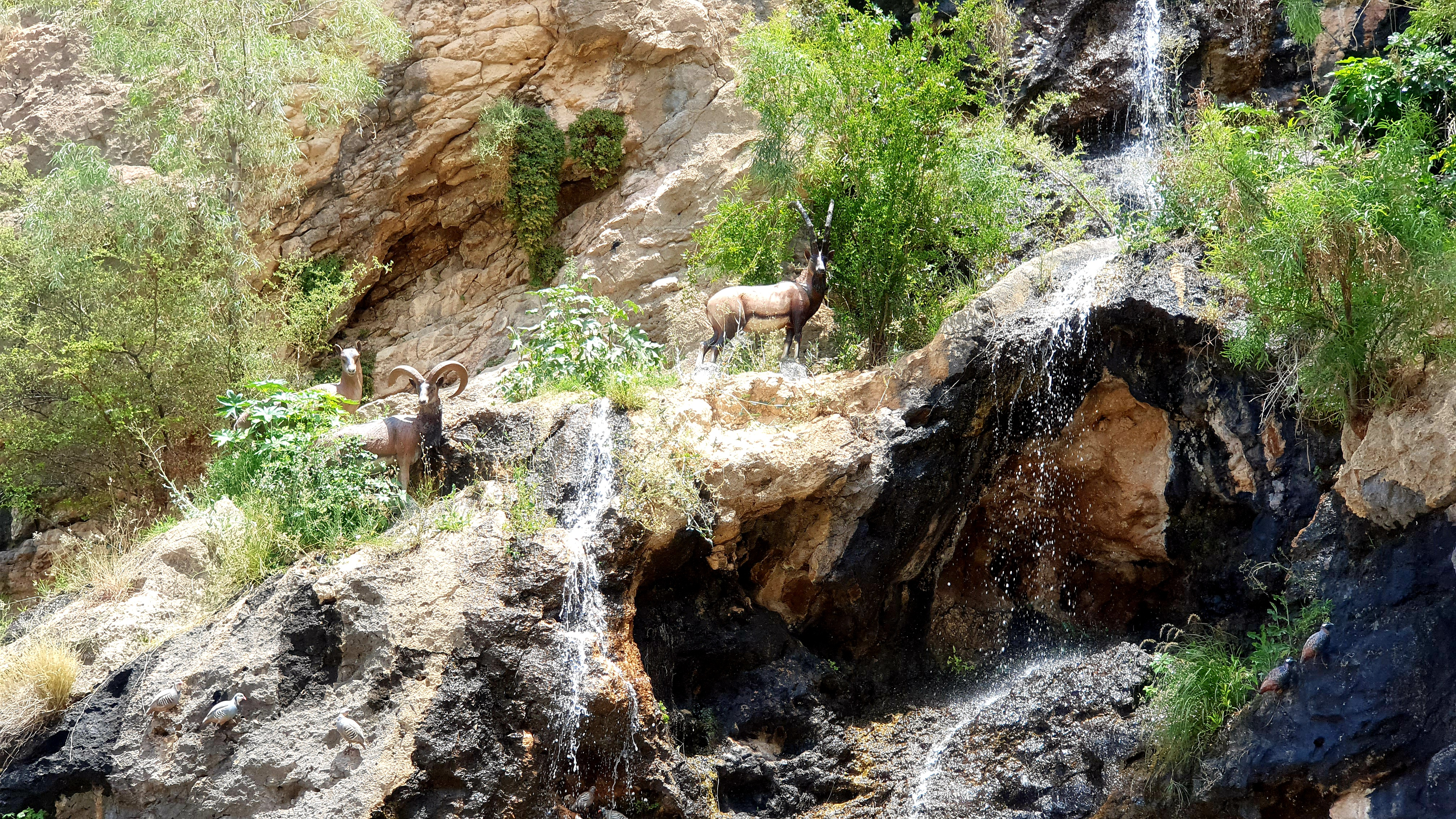
Statues of native animals of the Arjan and Parishan Protected Area

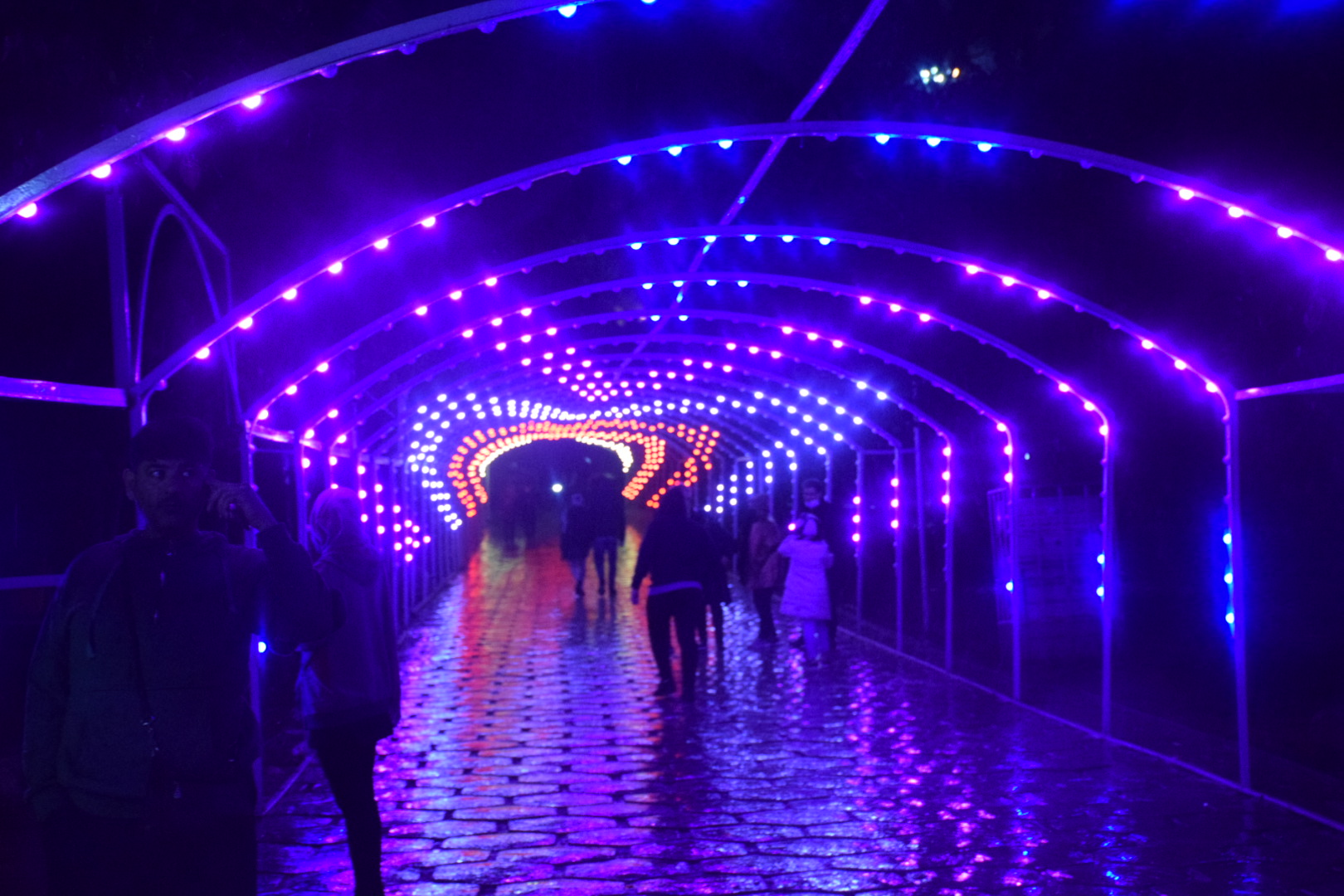
Entrance of Tang-e Tikab

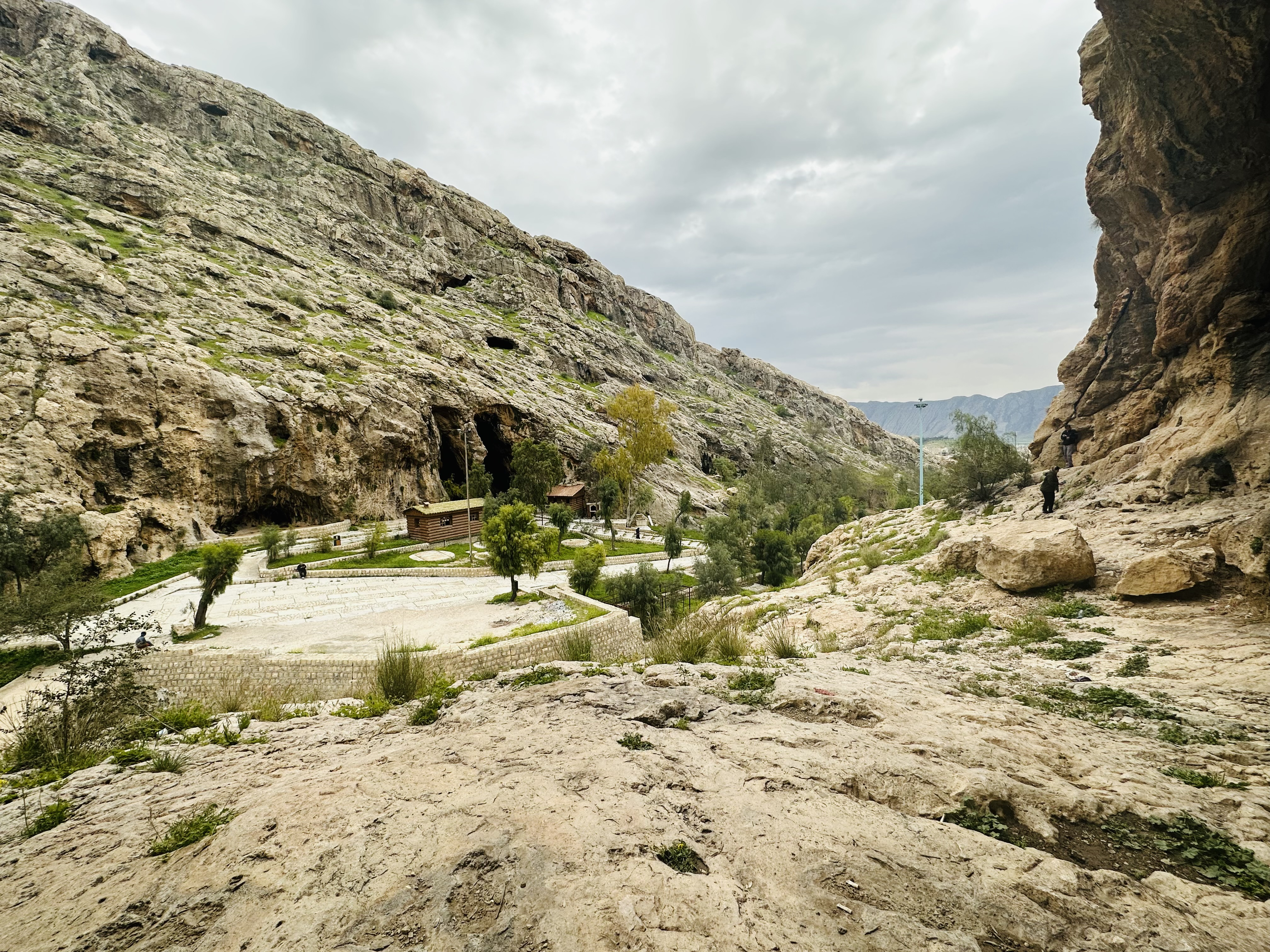
A view of Tang-e Tikab from inside one of the caves

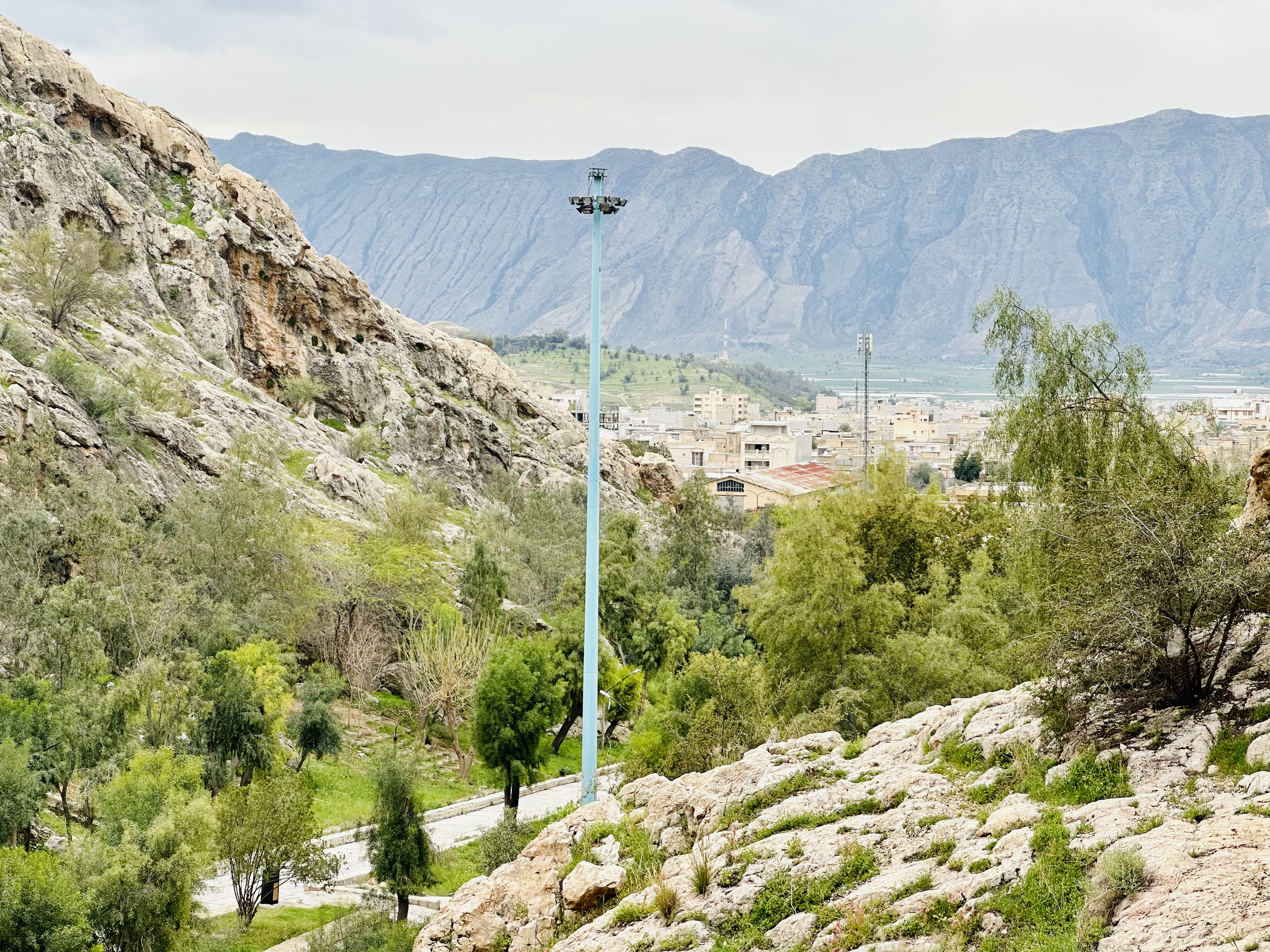
Tang-e Tikab

=== Tombs of famous people ===
There are famous tombs of Abu Ishaq of Kazerun, Amin al-Din Balyani, Jalal al-Din Davani, Abdollah Balyani and Nasrollah Mardani in Kazerun and its suburbs.

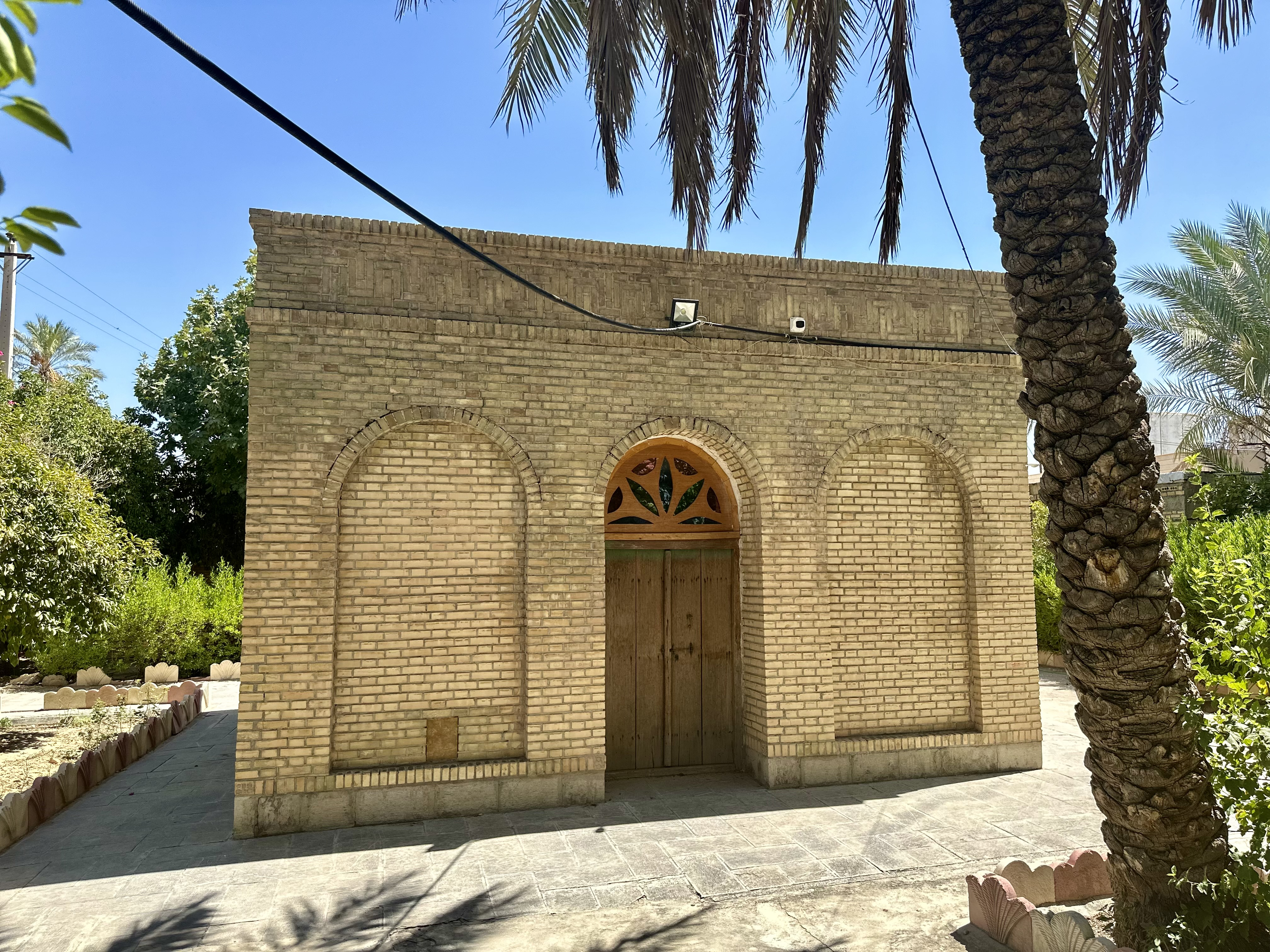
Tomb of Abu Ishaq of Kazerun

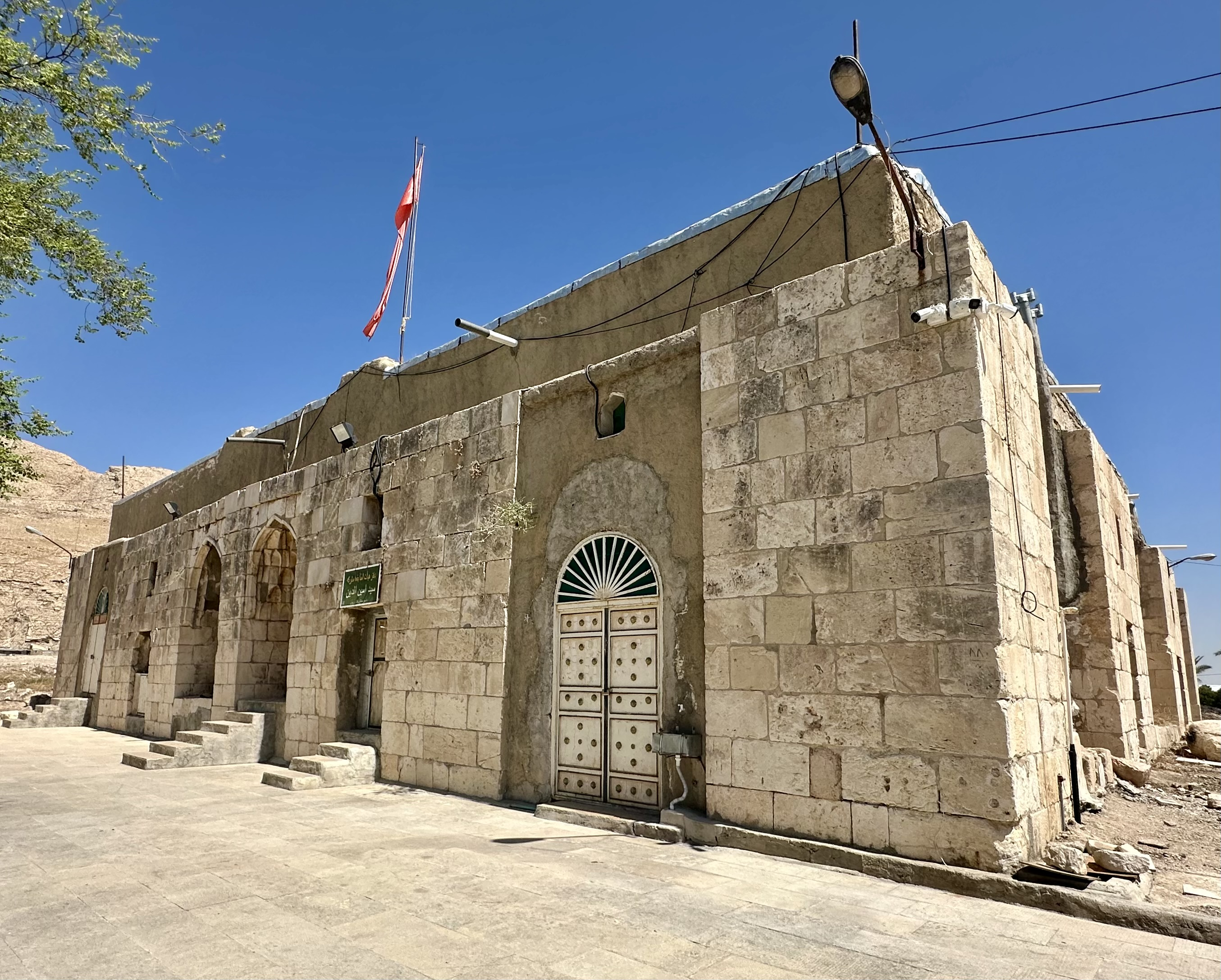
Tomb of Amin al-Din Balyani

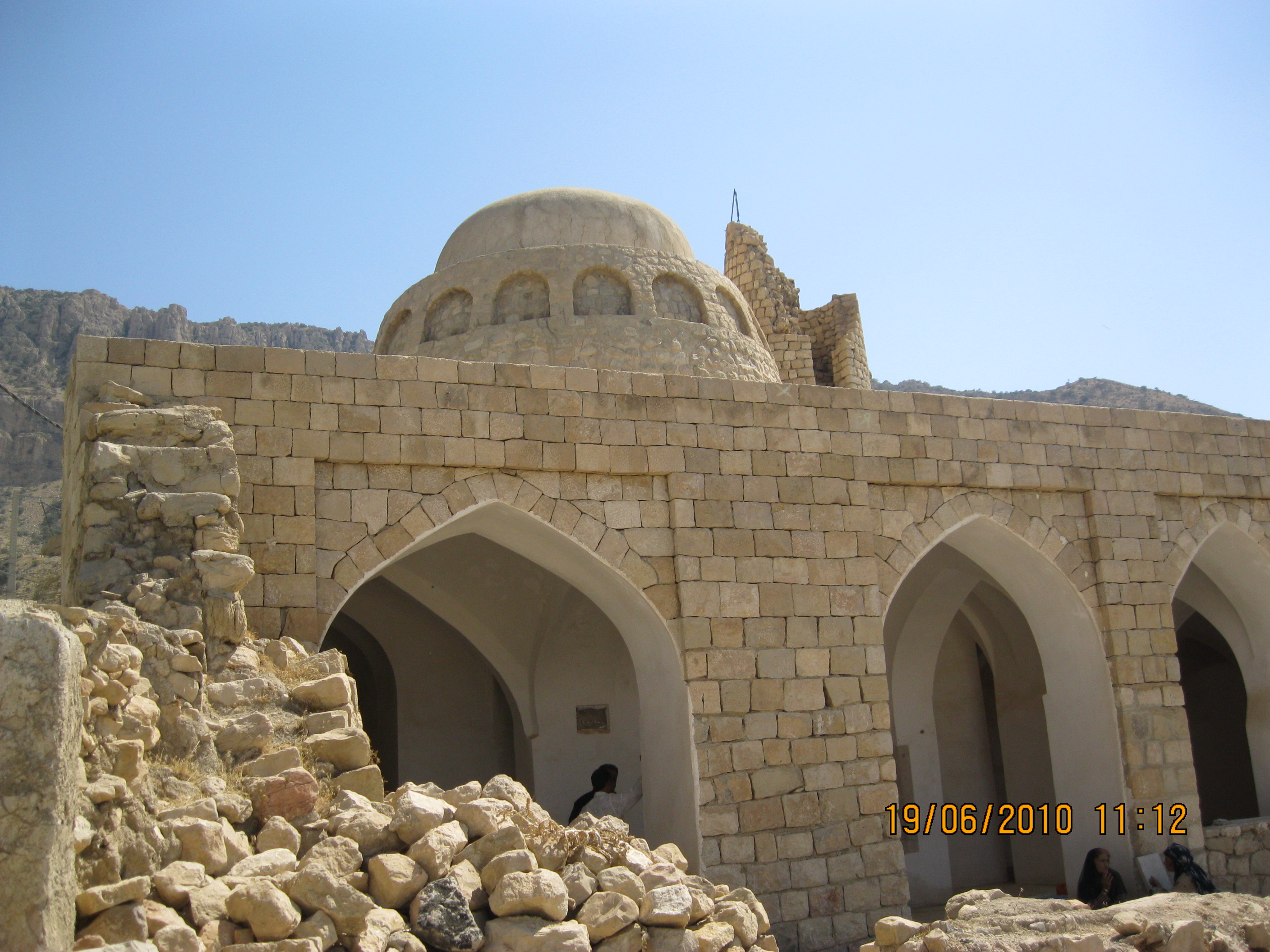
Tomb of Jalal al-Din Davani

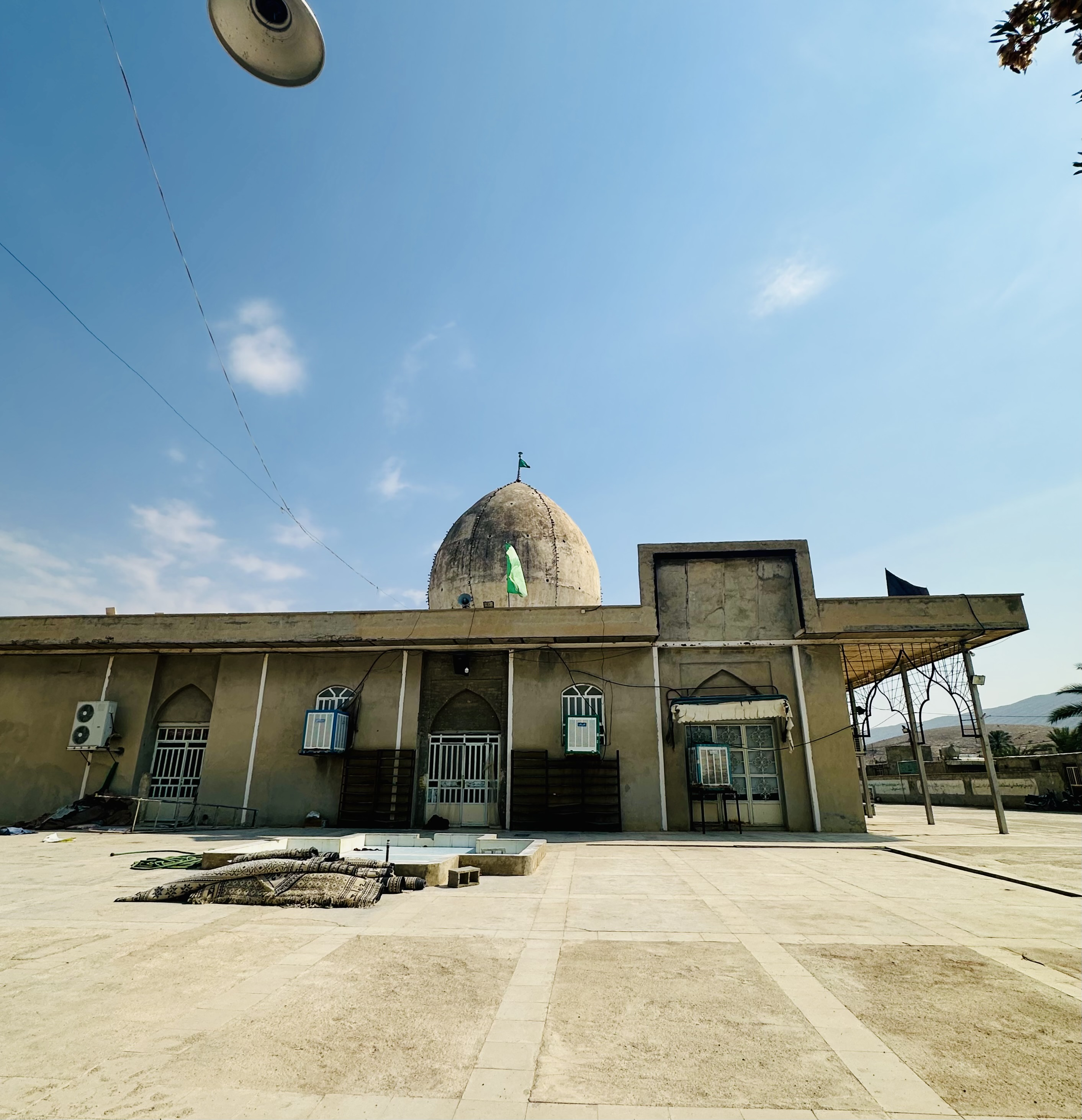
Tomb of Abdollah Balyani

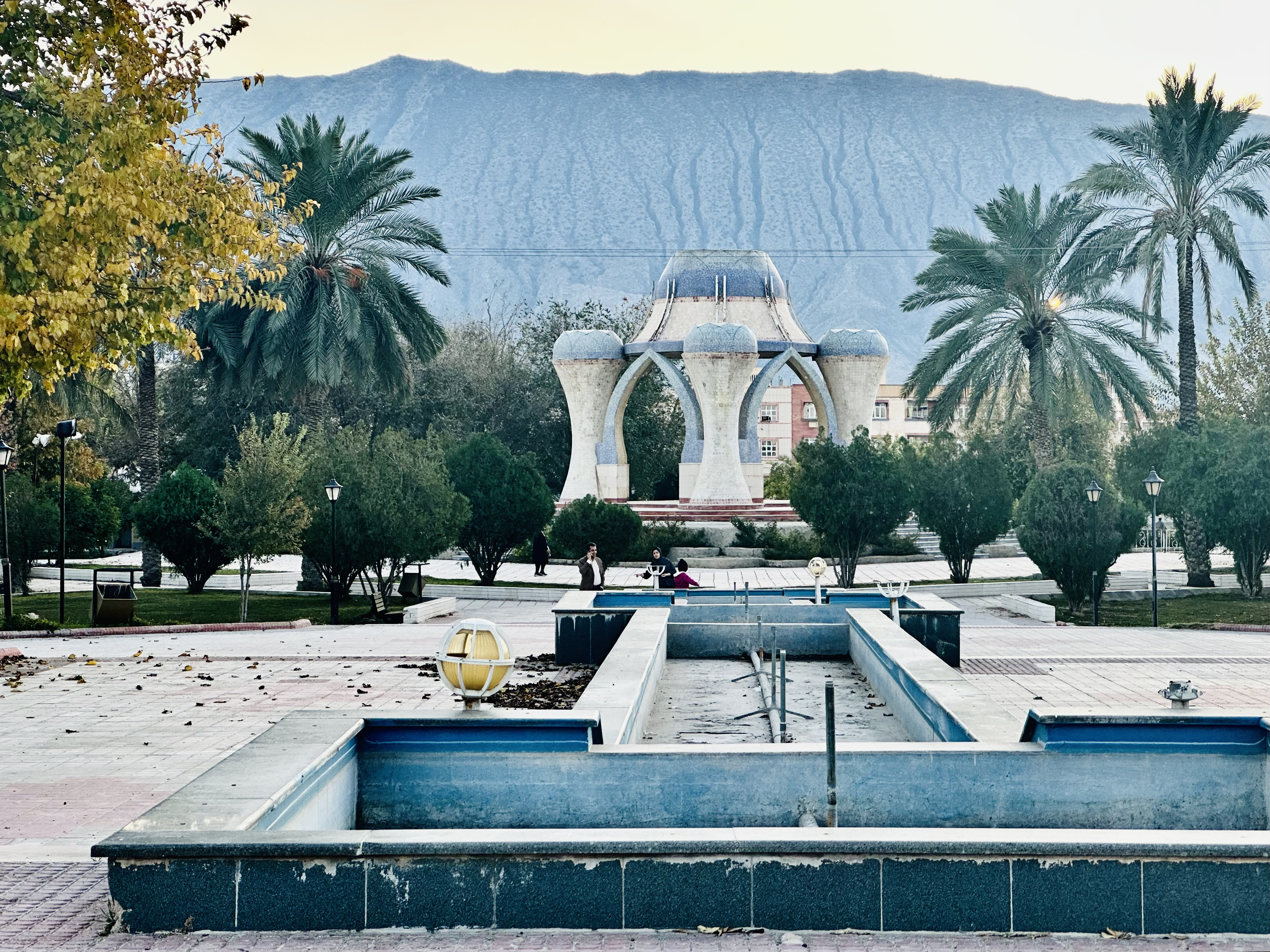
Tomb of Nasrollah Mardani

=== Caravanserais ===
Due to its location on the country's commercial highway, Kazerun has had numerous caravanserais throughout history, most of which have disappeared today. However, there are currently three prominent caravanserais of the Safavid era in the suburbs of Kazerun. Mian-Kotal Caravanserai is the most prominent of them, which is known as the only stone caravanserai in Iran. The other two caravanserais include Kamarej and Konartakhteh caravanserais.

=== Rivers and springs ===
The two main rivers, Shapur and Jereh, pass from the west and east sides of Kazerun and are among the tourist attractions of this city. Among the prominent springs of Kazerun are the springs of Sarab-e Ardeshir, Sasan, Sarab-e Dokhtaran, Dadin and Bidmeshk.

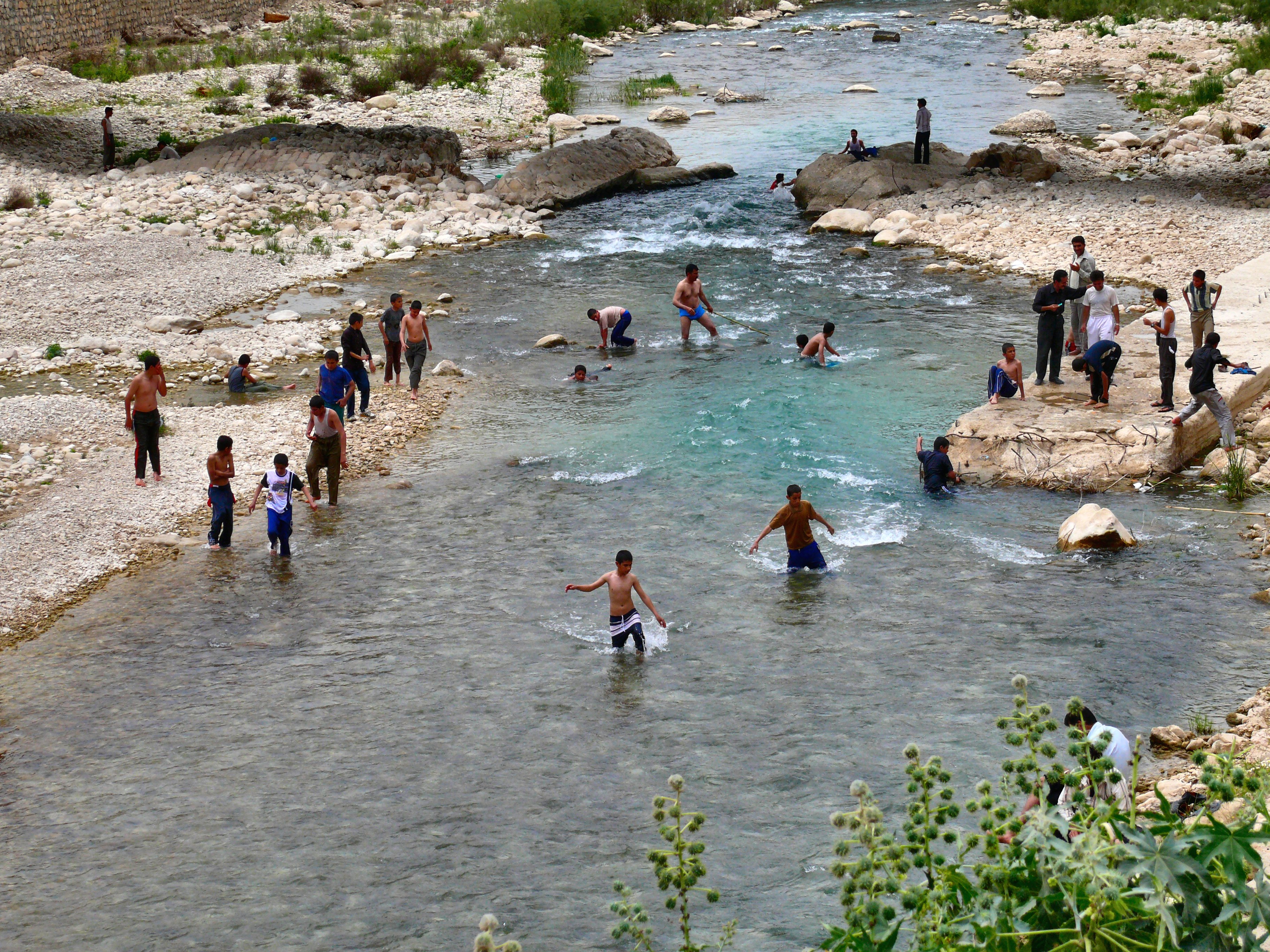
Shapur river

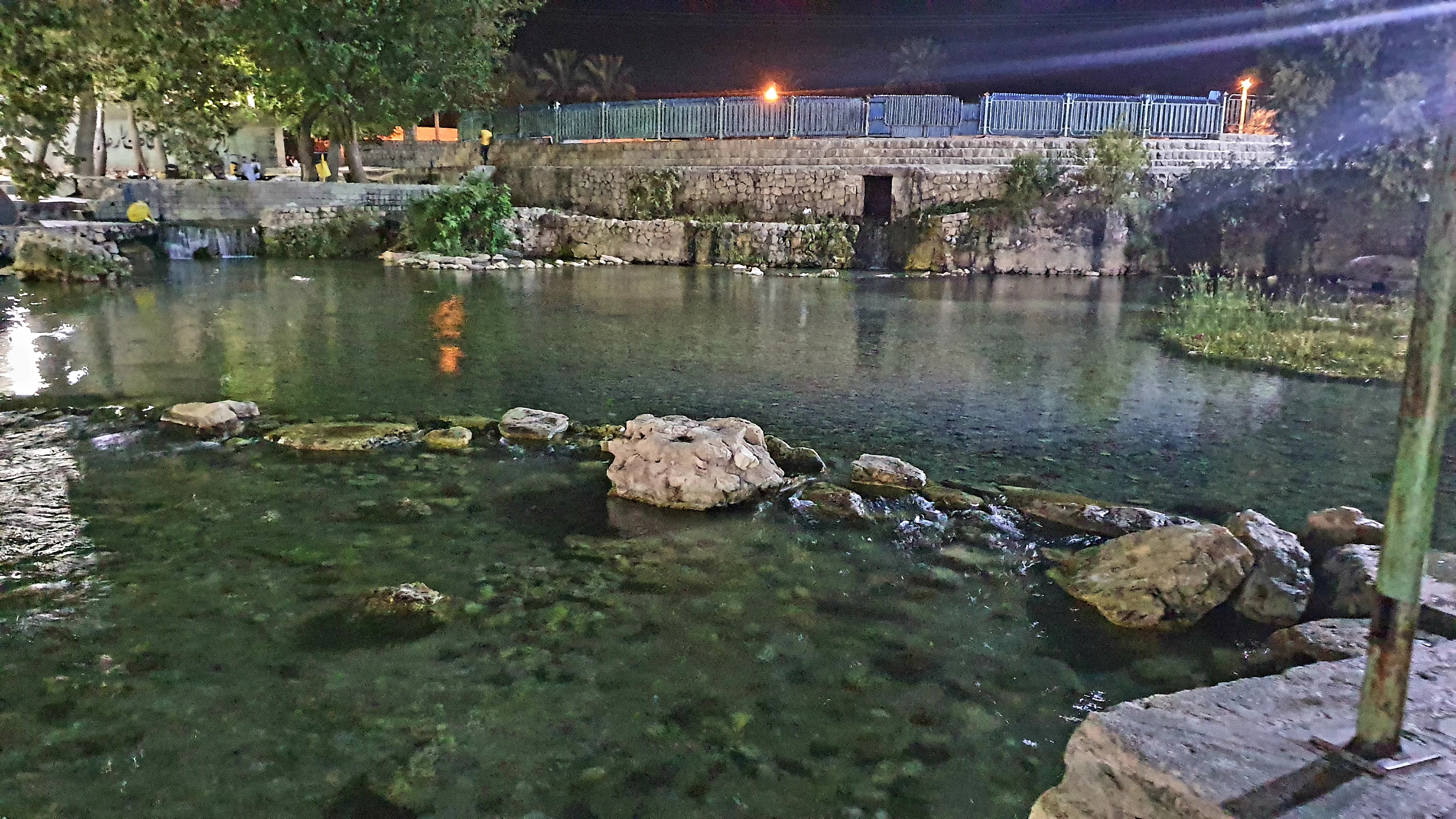
Sarab-e Ardeshir spring

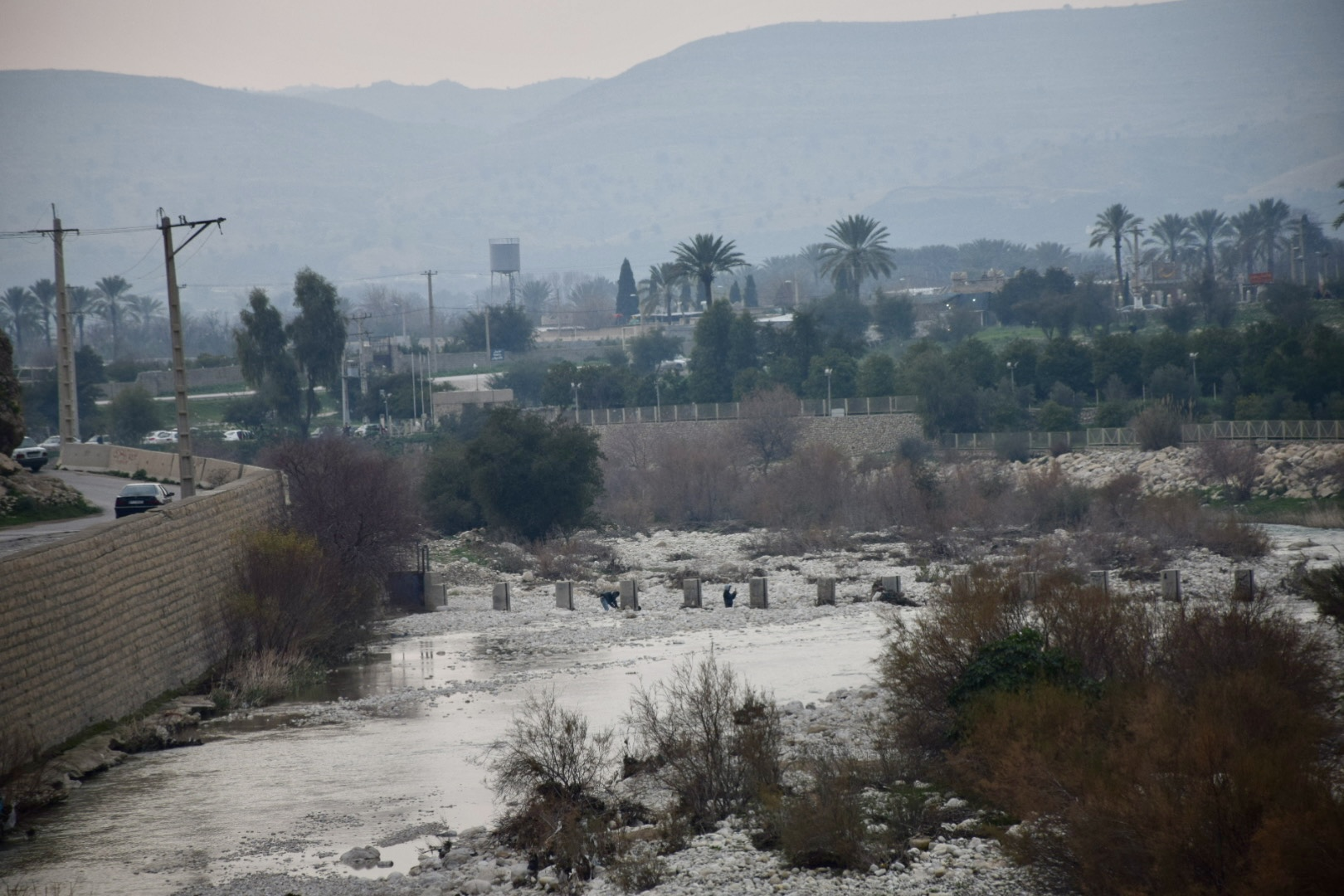
Shapur river

=== Other parks and gardens ===
In addition to the mentioned cases, Kazerun city has several large and small parks and gardens. This city also has several hilly and forest parks.

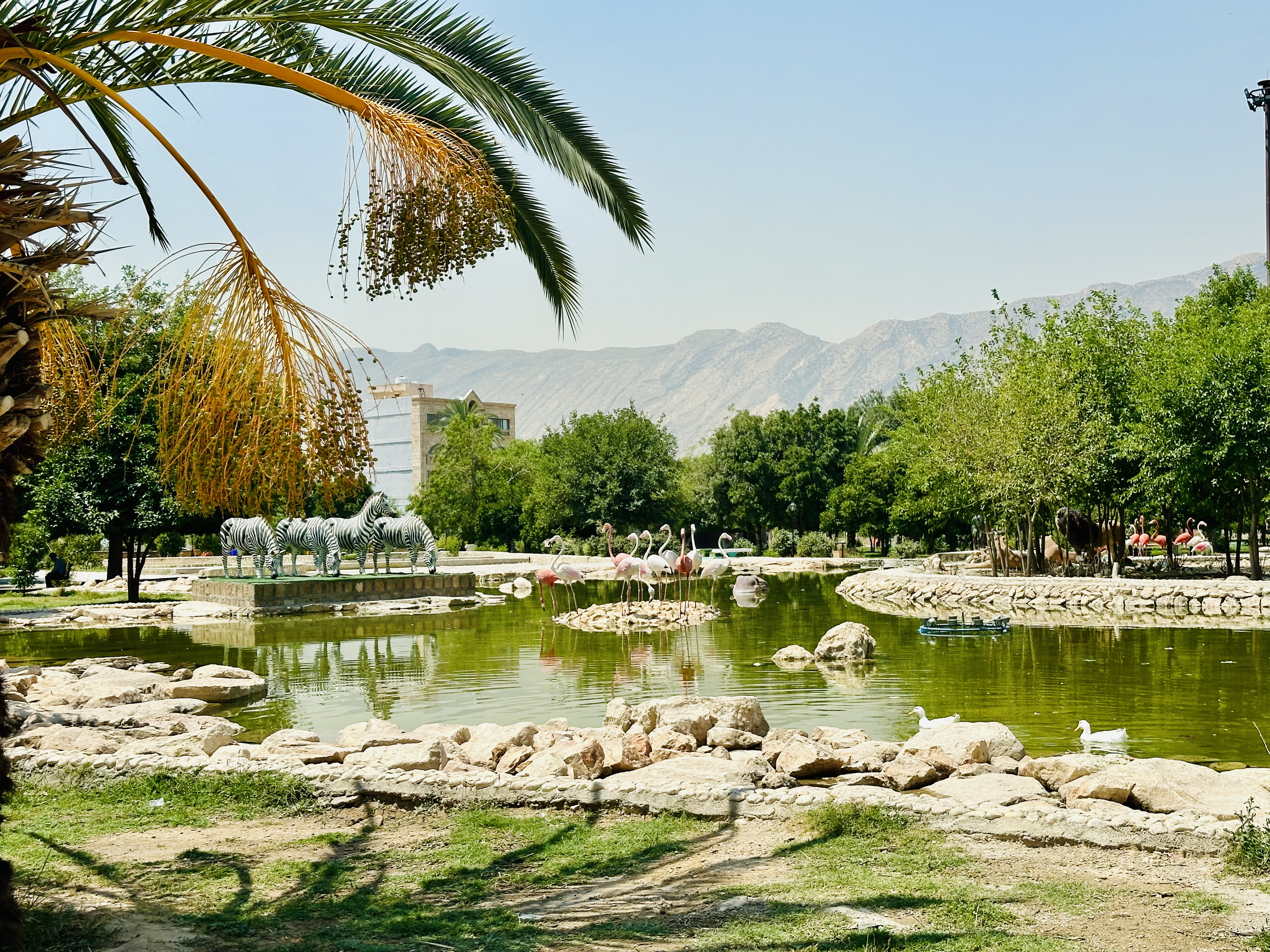
Rafi garden

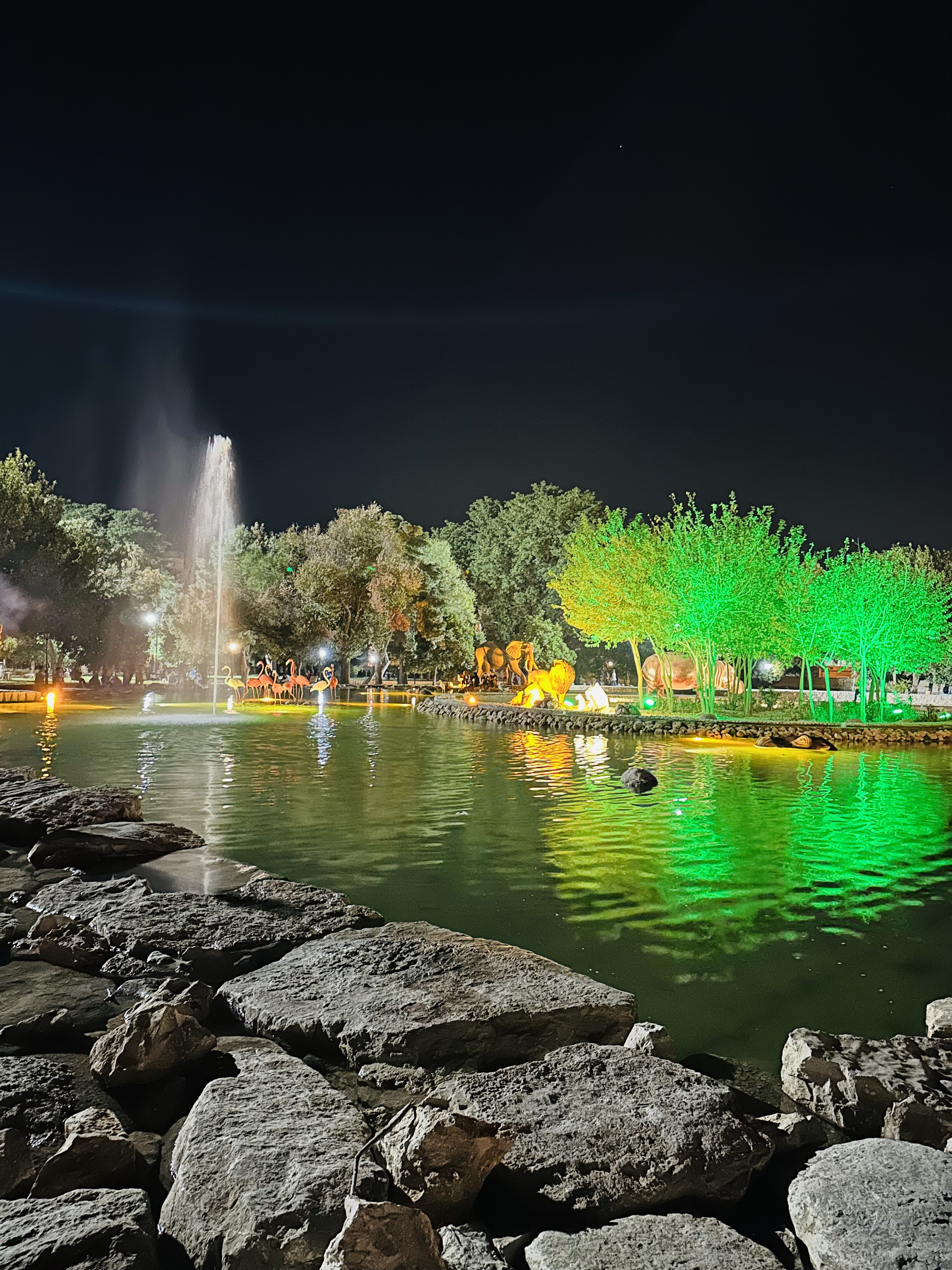
Rafi garden at night

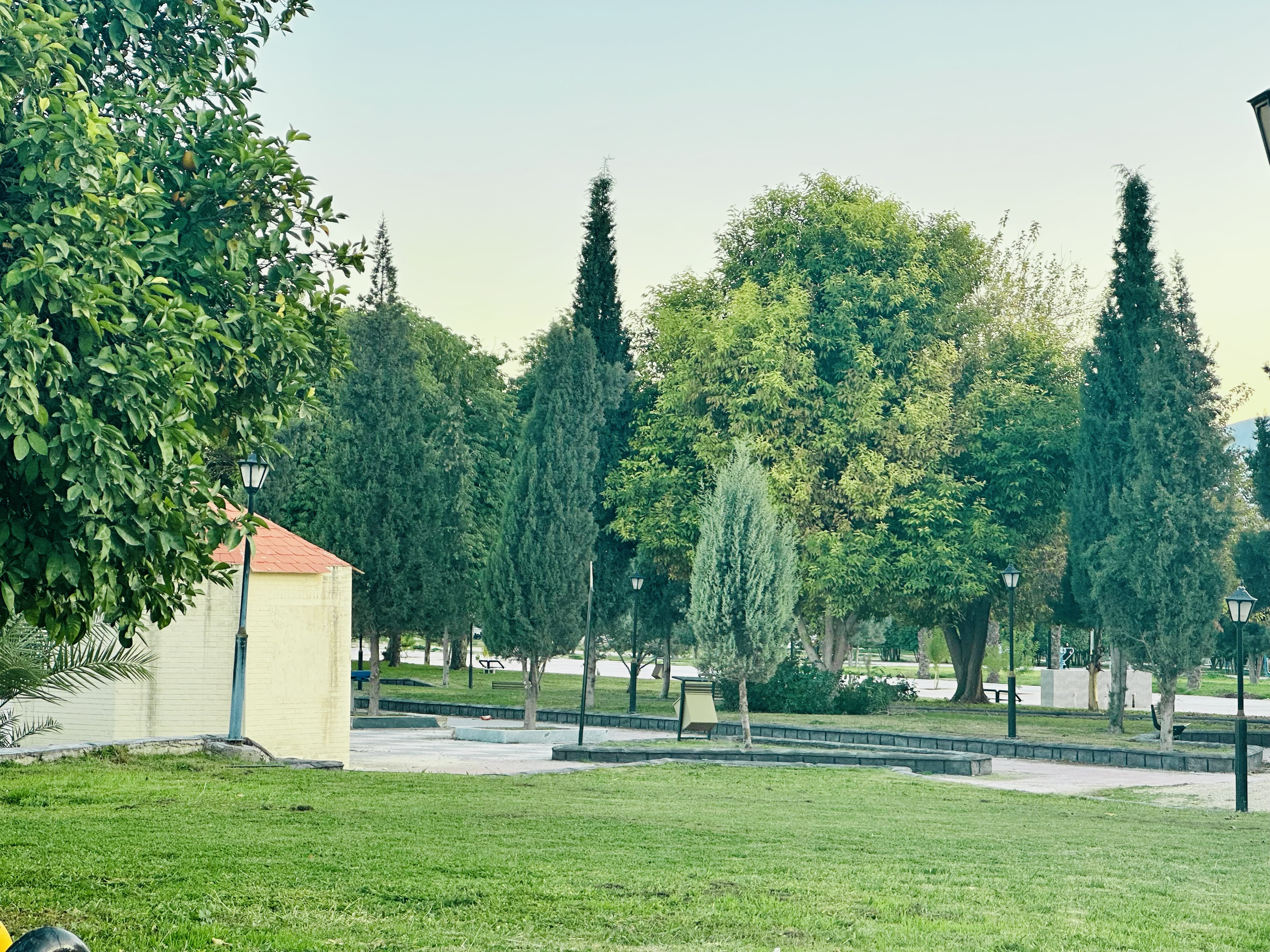
Mardani park

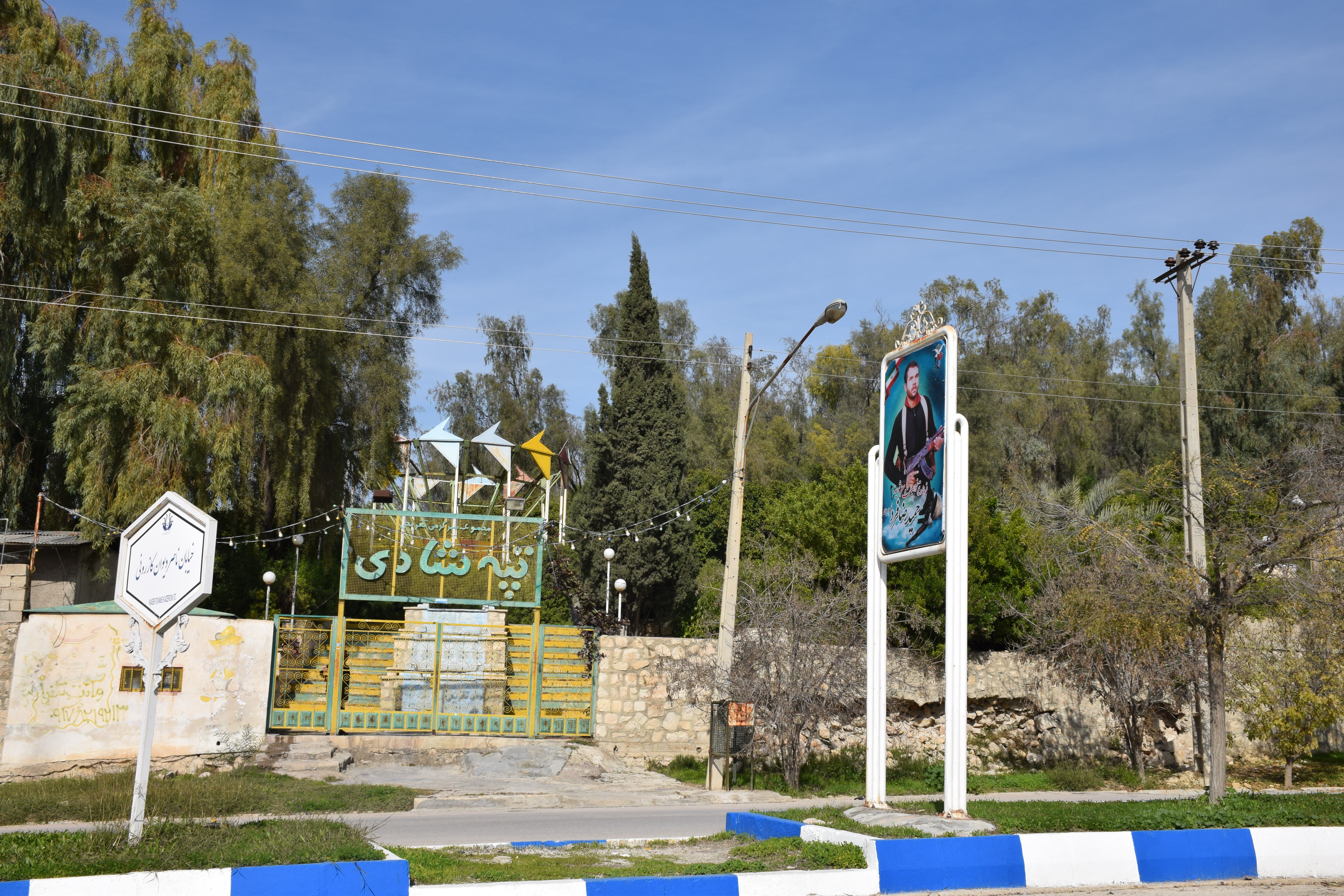
Tepe Shadi amusement park which is now abandoned

=== Other historical attractions ===
Among the other historical attractions of Kazerun are Kartir's relief in Sarmashhad, Fire Temple of Kazerun, Puskan Castle, Jereh Fire Temple and Teymoor Mirza relief.

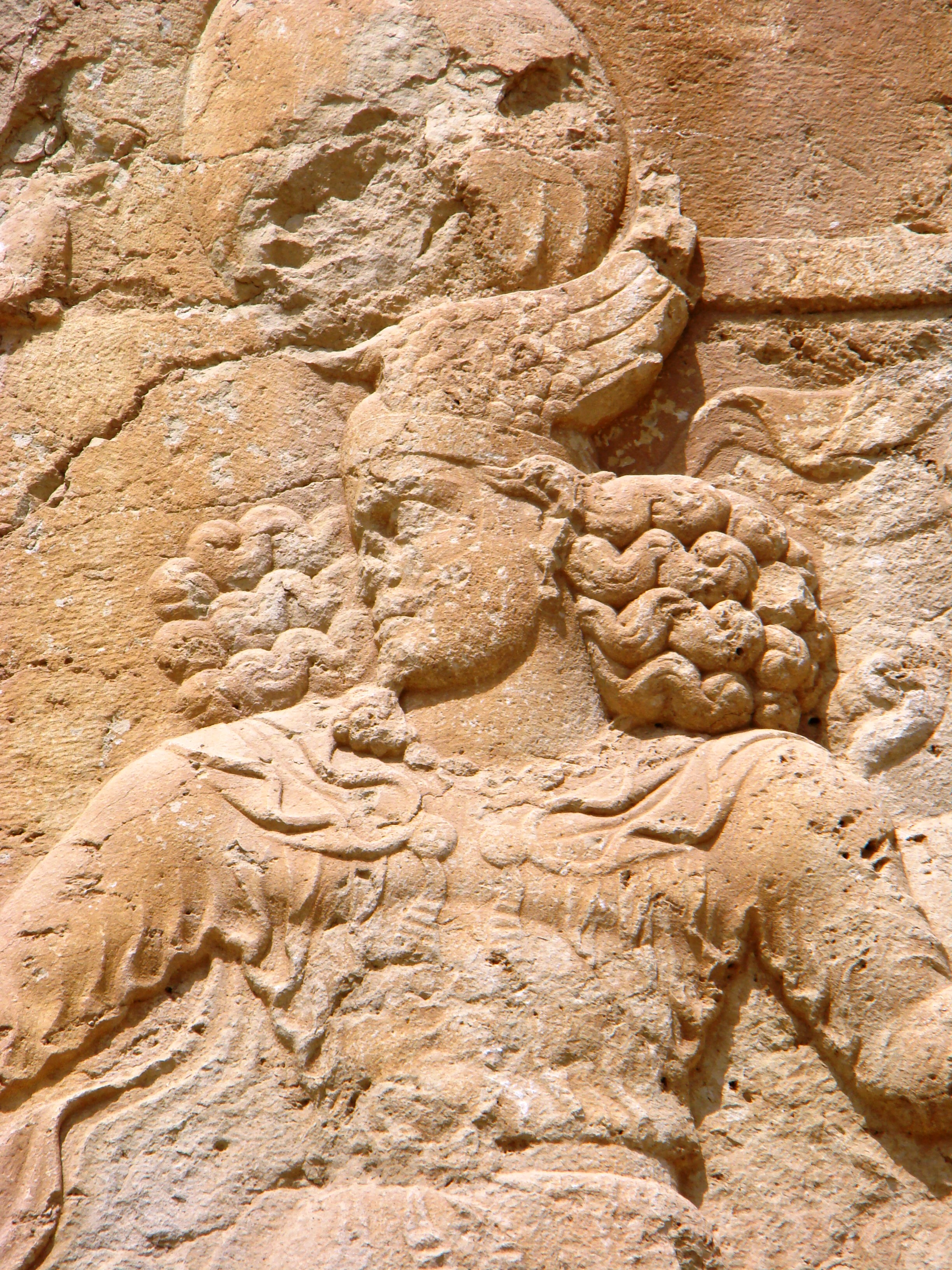
Kartir's relief

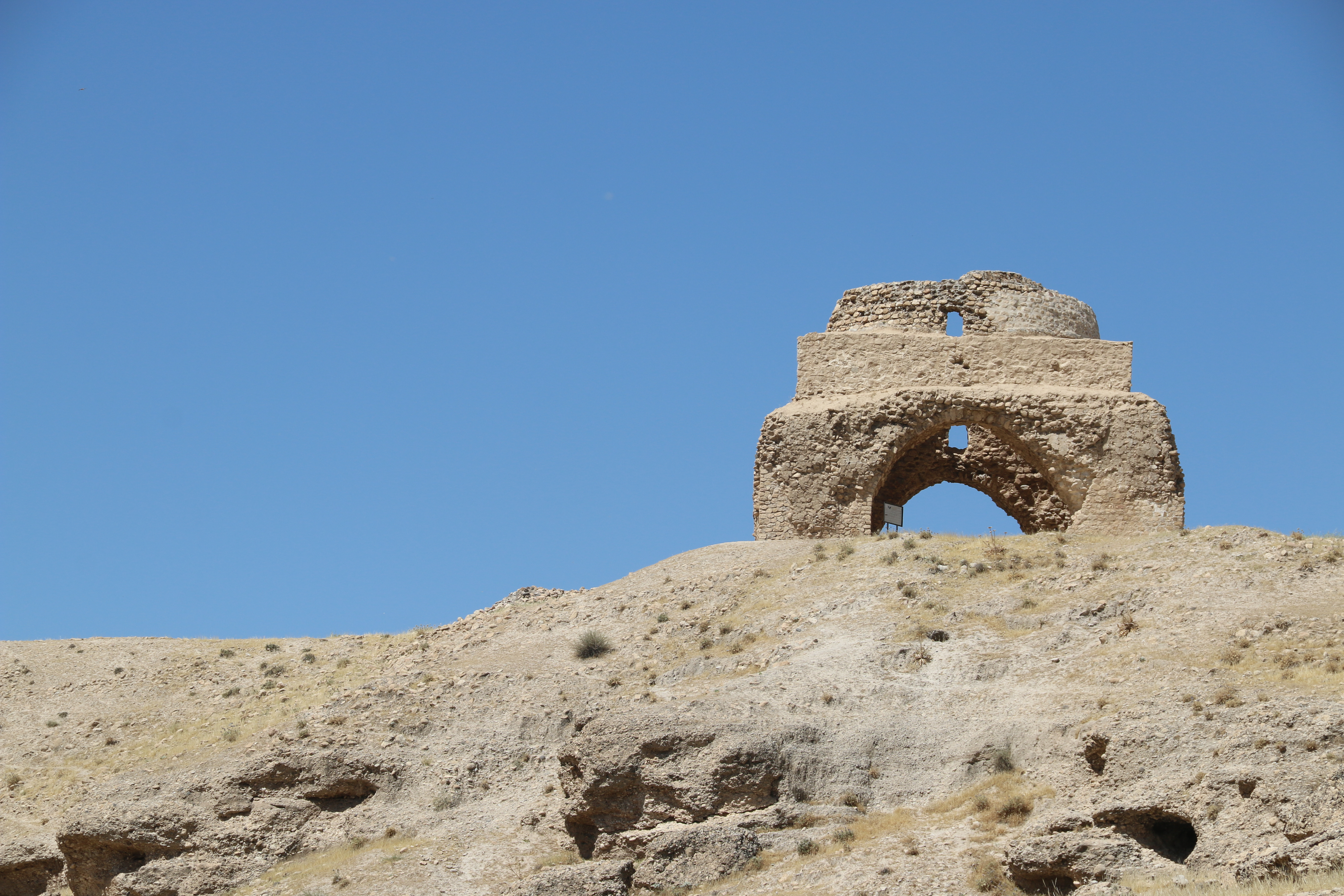
Jereh Fire temple

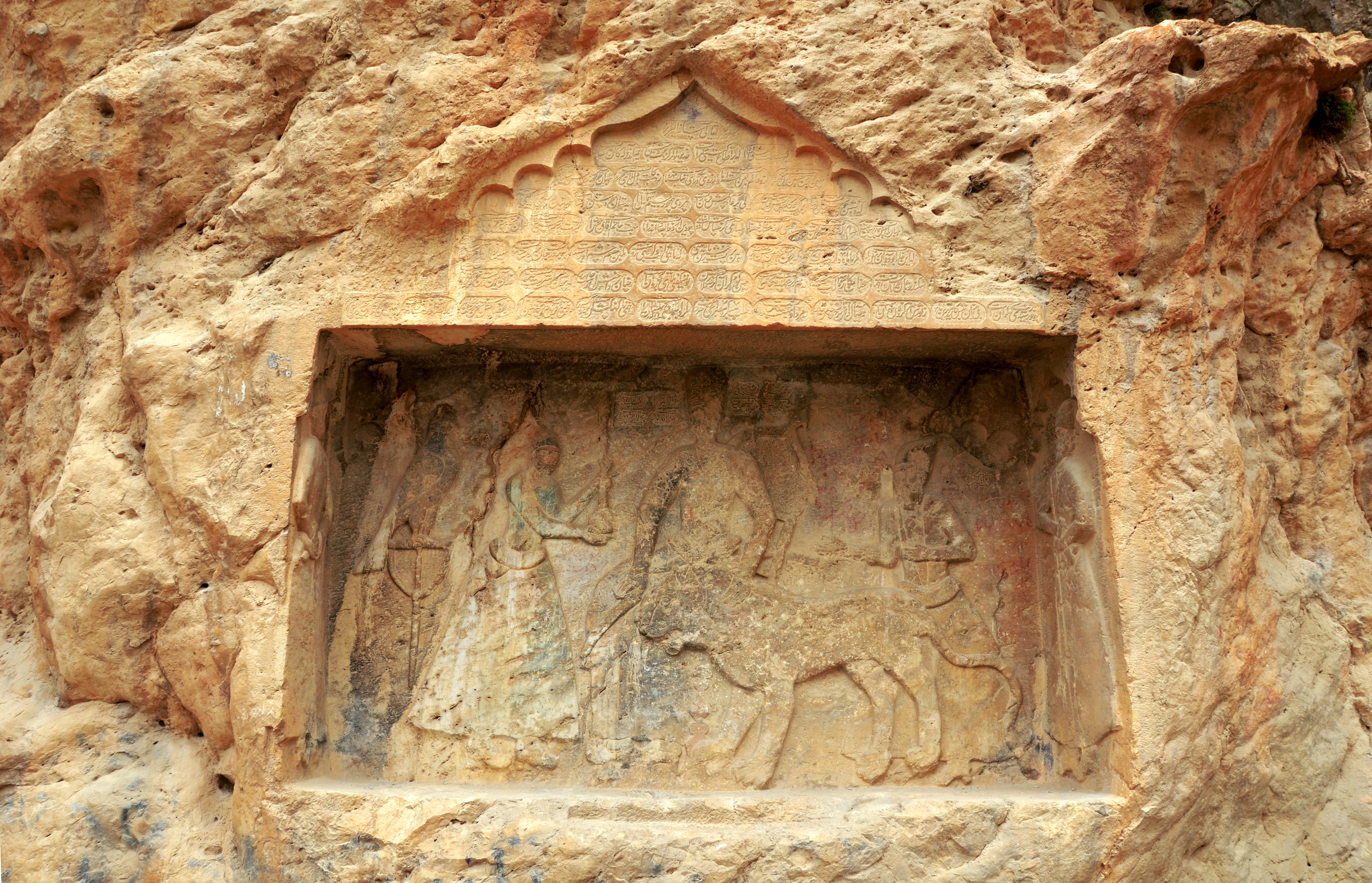
The relief of Teymoor Mirza, the ruler of Kazerun during the Qajar period and the grandson of Fath-Ali Shah Qajar

=== Other natural tourist attractions ===
Other natural attractions of Kazerun include the heights of the northern and southern mountain ranges, the plains around the city, as well as the historical Kalani and Buranjan Cypresses.

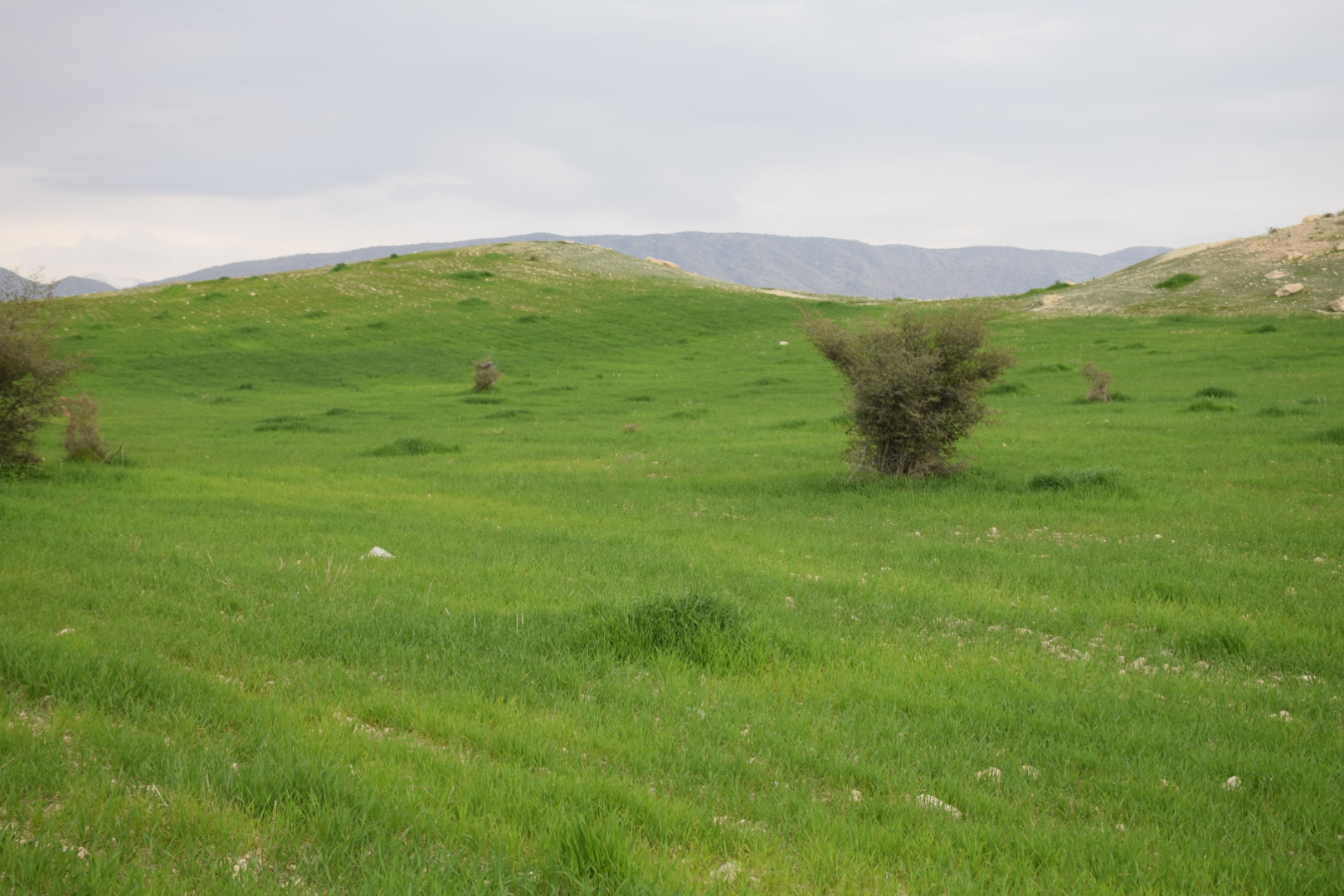
The nature of the plains around Kazerun

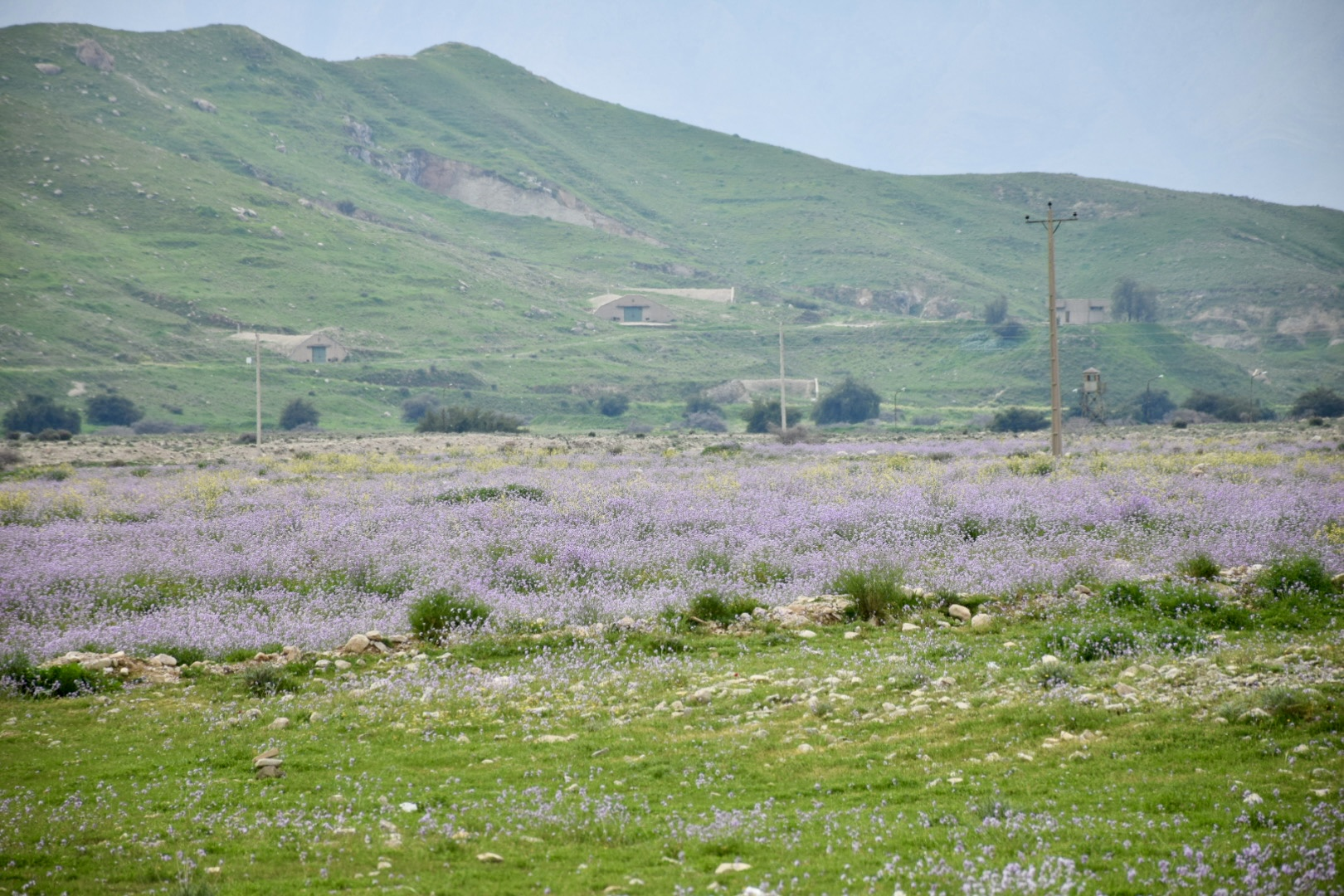
The plain of purple flowers of Kazerun

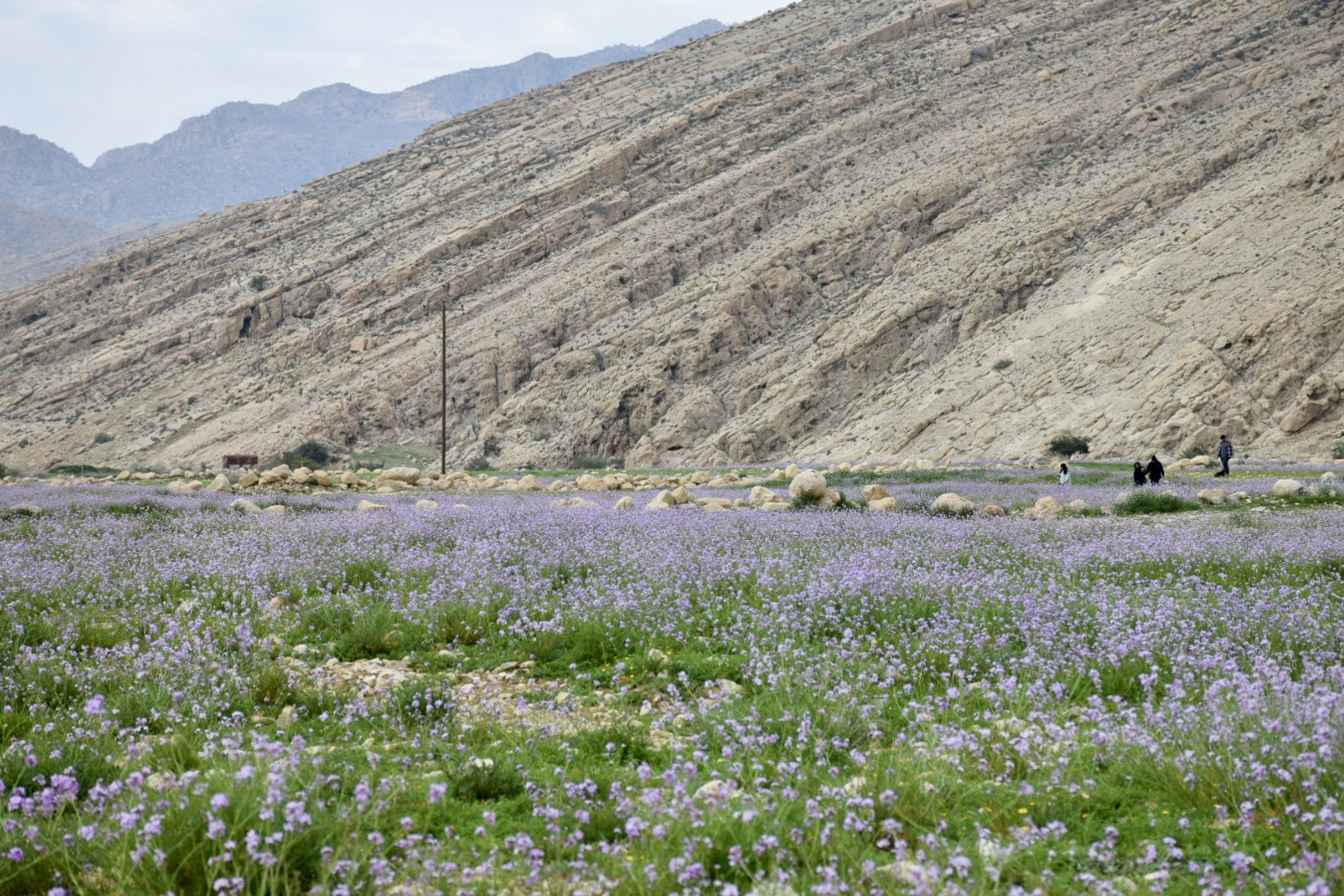
The plain of purple flowers of Kazerun

=== Other religious attractions ===
Among the other important religious attractions in Kazerun are the holy shrine of Shah Hamzeh, Imamzadeh Seyyed Mohammad Nourbakhsh, Imamzadeh Seyyed Mohammad Kashi and Khidr steps.

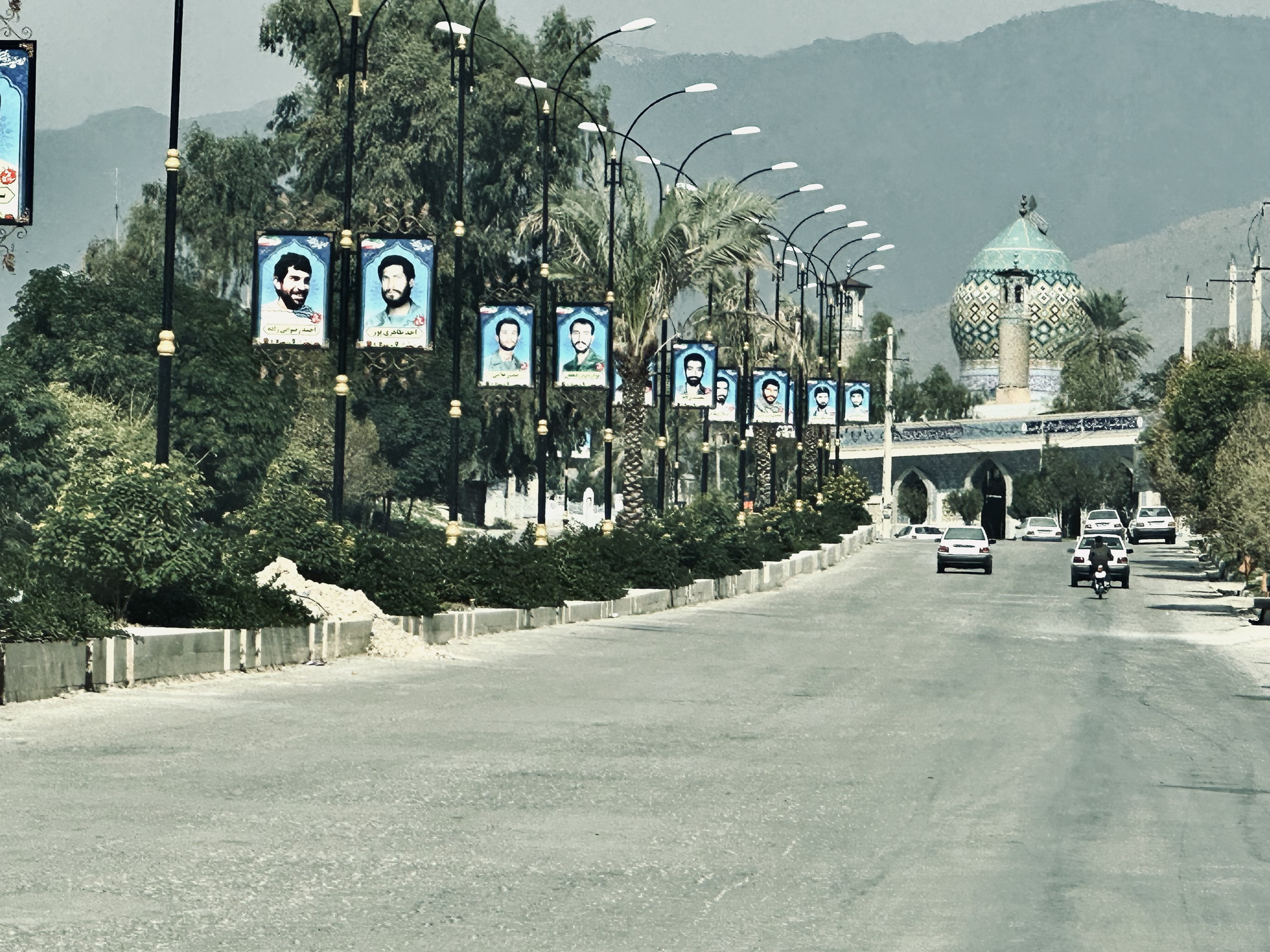
Imamzadeh Seyyed Mohammad Nourbakhsh

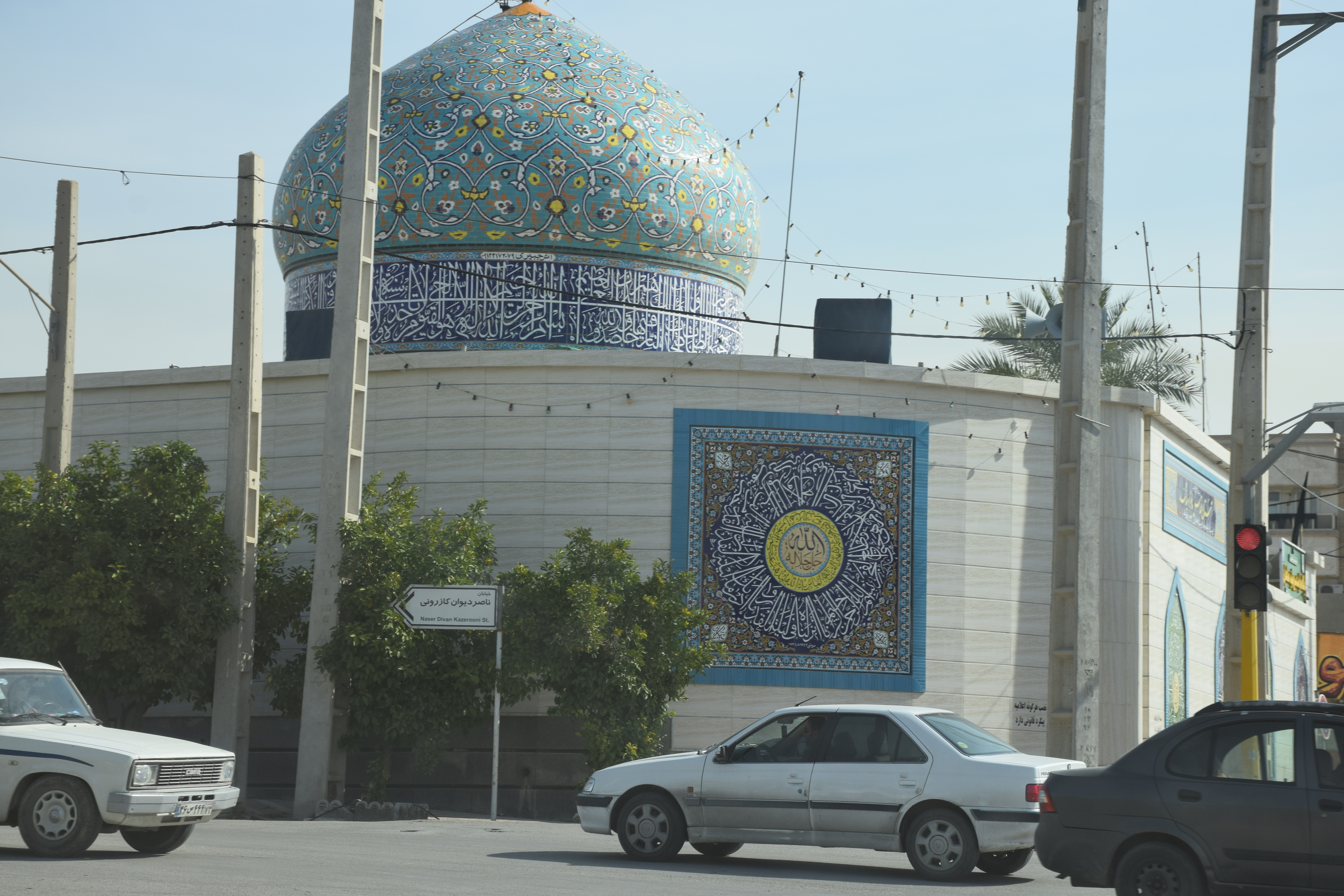
Imamzadeh Seyyed Mohammad Kashi

=== Souvenirs ===
Kazerun has many handicrafts and souvenirs. Among the most prominent handicrafts of Kazerunare Dulcheh, Malki and Rovar (varieties of giveh), mosaic, earthenware, textile, Persian carpet, kilim, gabbeh, felt, jajim, hat, Yalmeh carpet, basket and copper items. Among the foods of Kazerun, aush of Kazerun has reached the national register. Other famous food souvenirs of Kazerun include the traditional kabab koobideh, ashkardeh, aush of akhrak (mountain almond), aush of herb, lamrik aush, dum pukht, golak-moosir Torshi, gabuleh, lalak of eggplant, keverak torshi, ayran of chicory, date palm, masghati, citrus fruits, olive and oak. Narcissus flower and orange blossom are typical souvenirs of Kazerun.

Tang-e Chogan village of Kazerun has been registered as a national rendbafi village in the country.

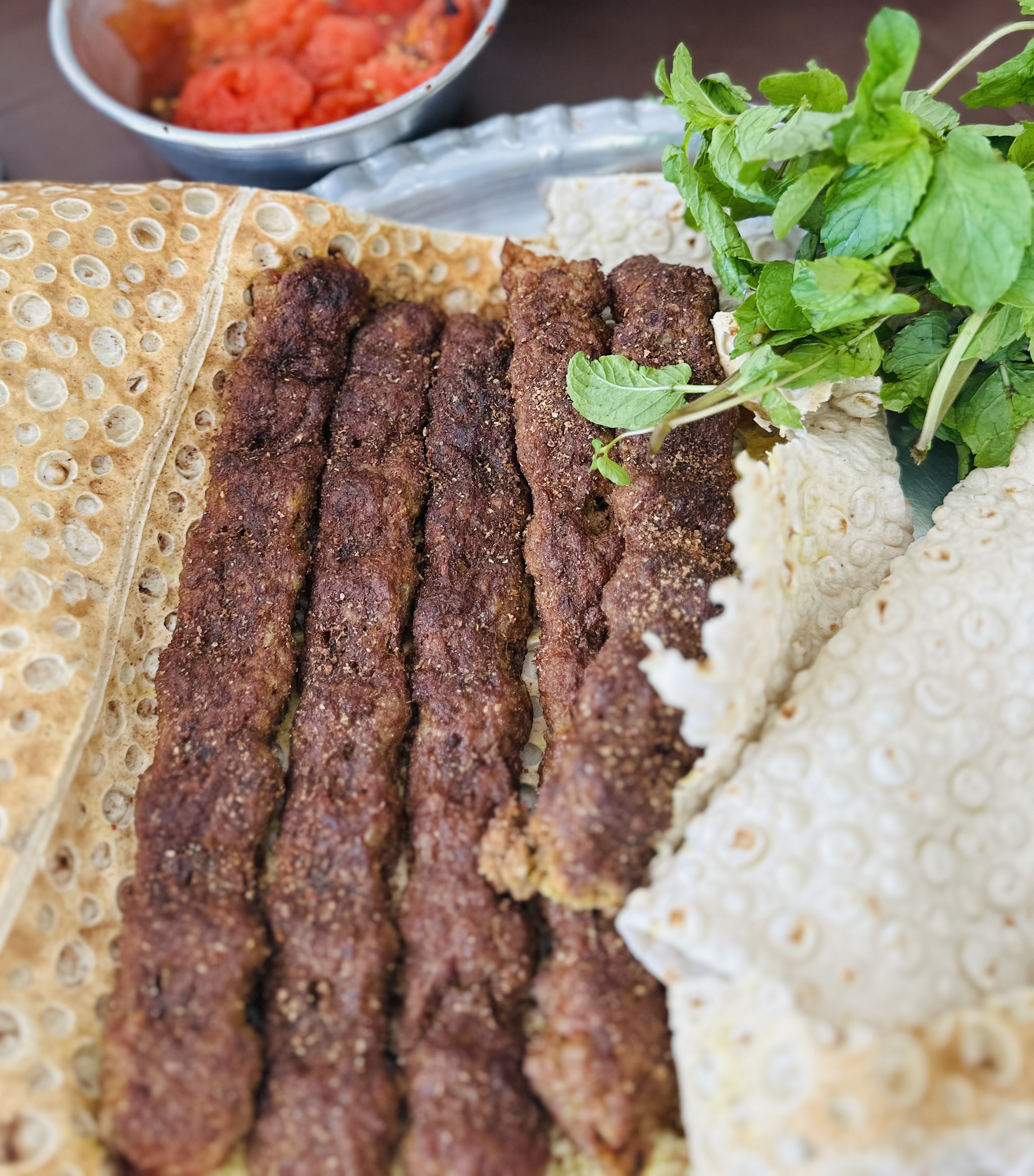
Traditional kebab of Kazerun

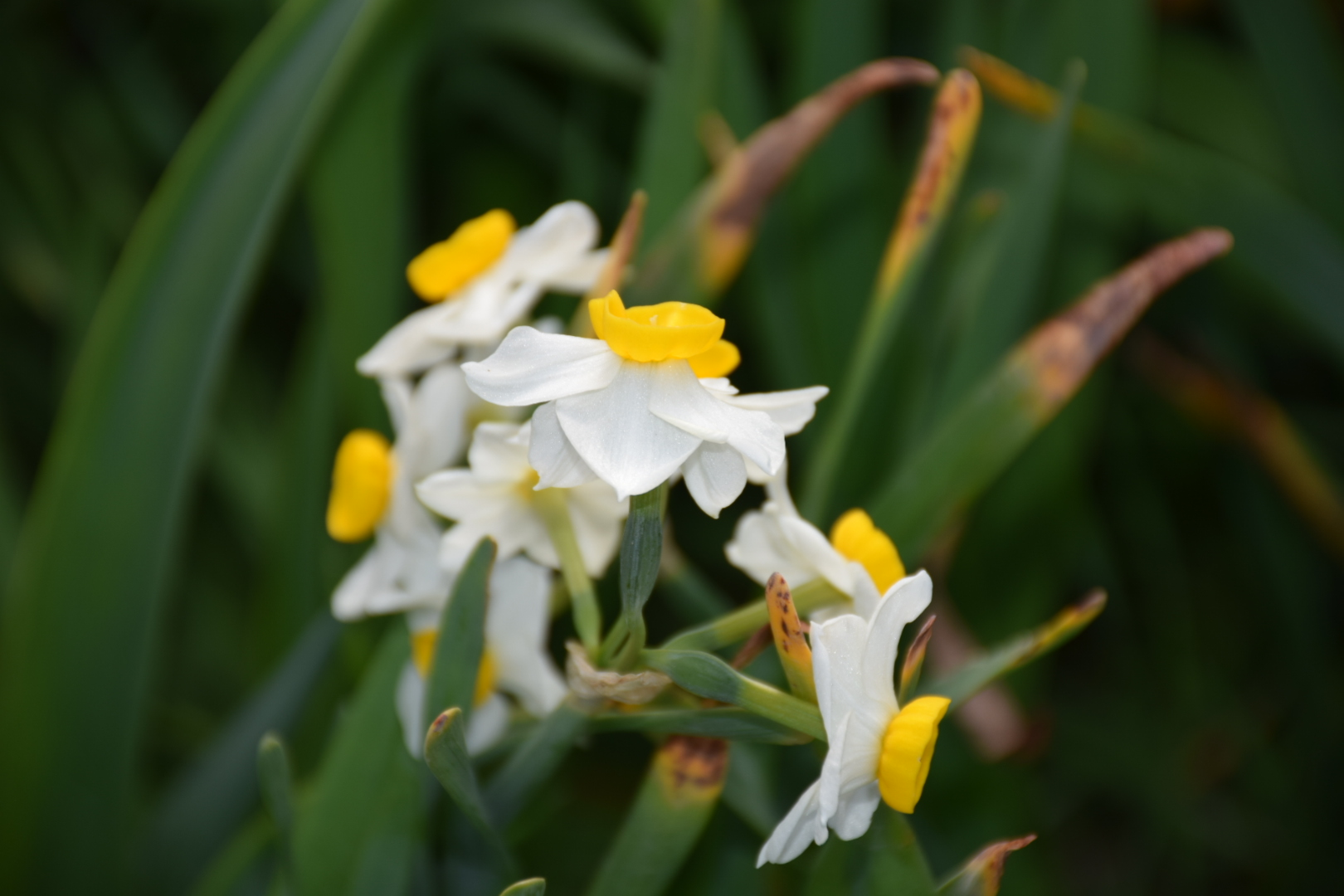
Narcissus of Kazerun

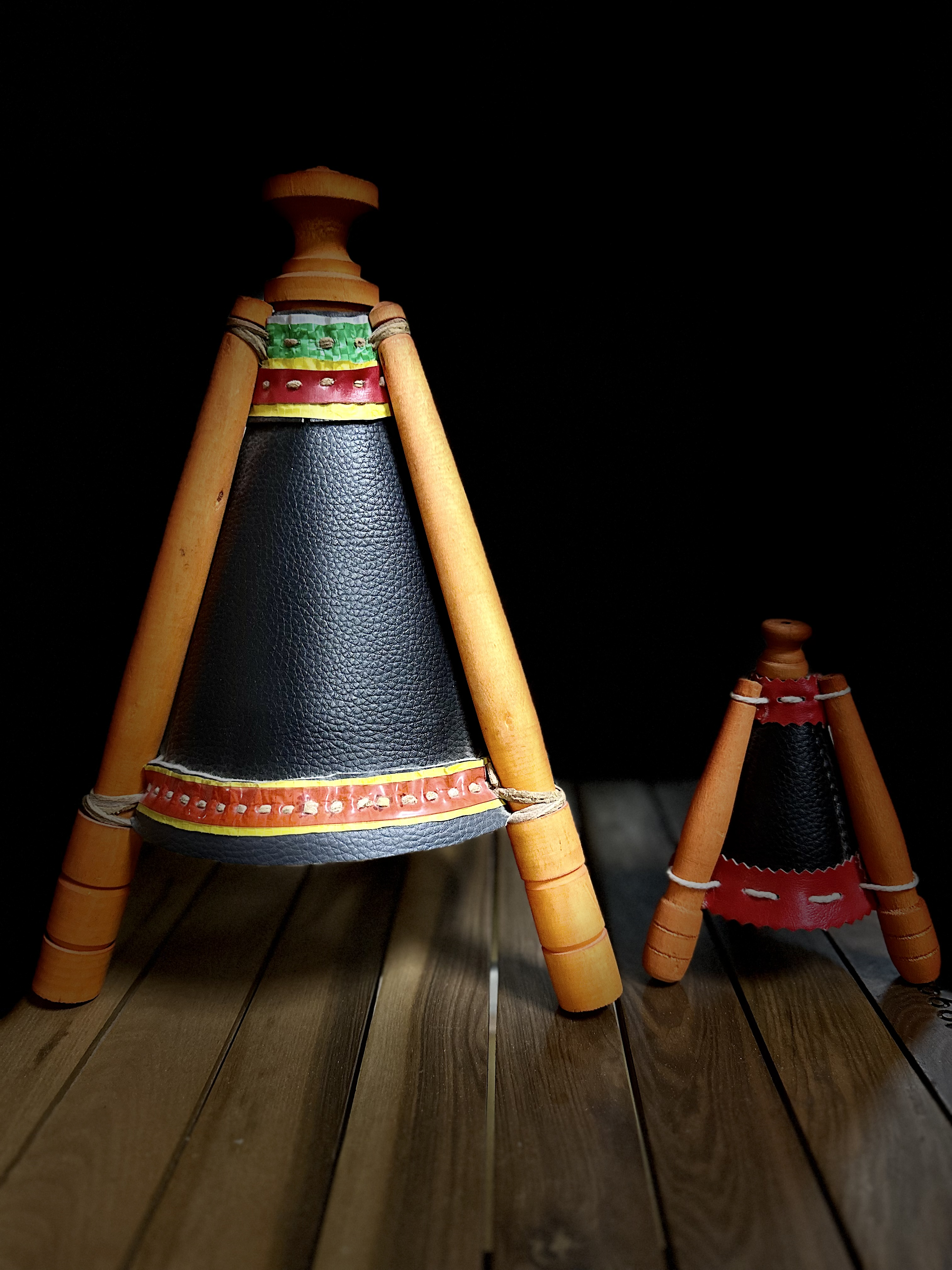
Dulcheh, from the special souvenirs of Kazerun

=== Museums ===
Among the important museums of Kazerun are the Anthropology Museum of Kazerun and the Bishapur Museum. Several rural museums are also active in the target villages of tourism in the suburbs of Kazerun.

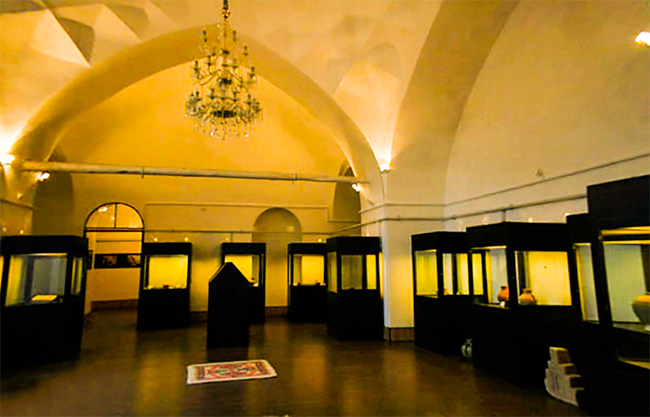
Anthropological Museum of Kazerun

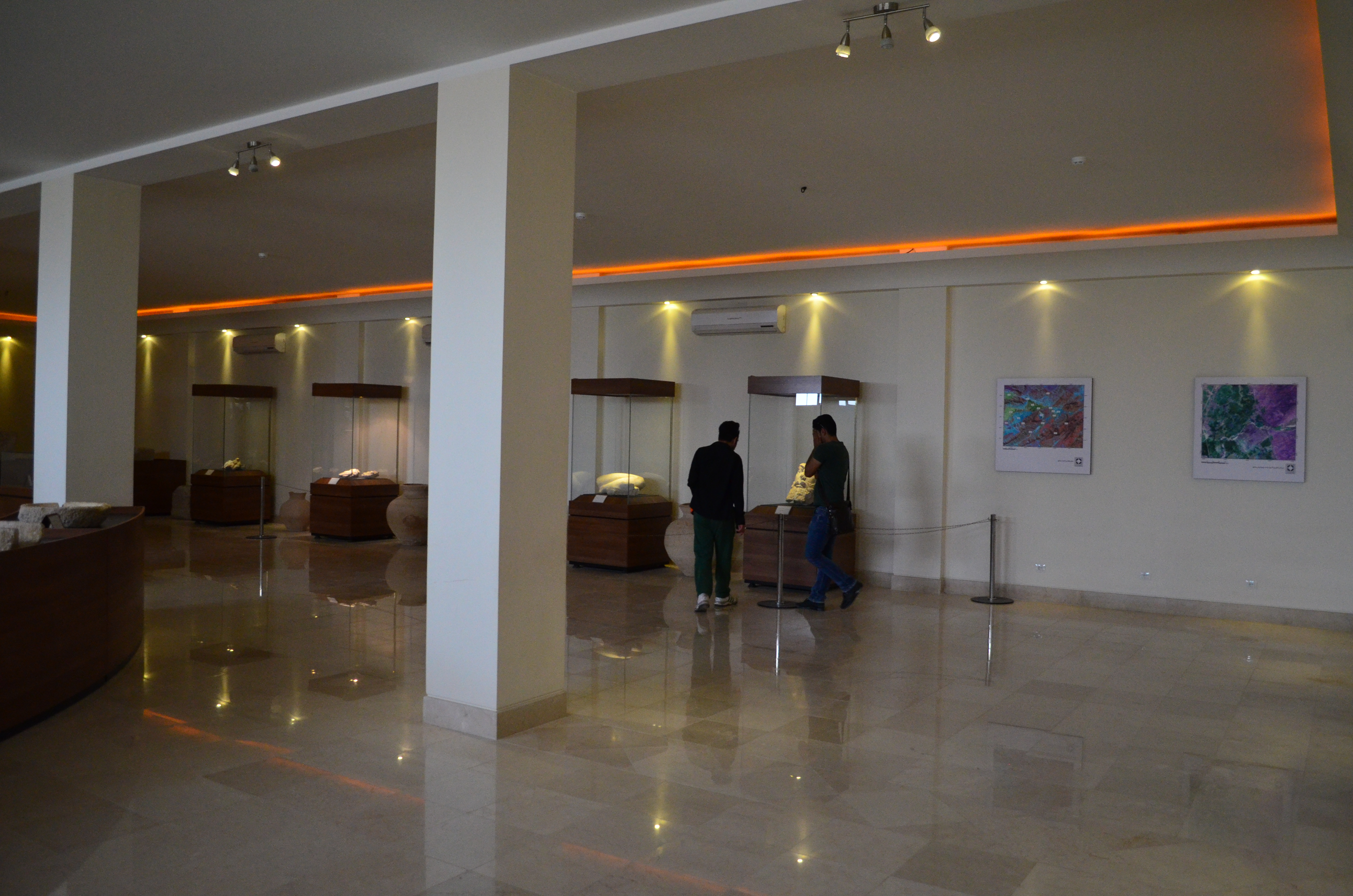
Bishapur Museum

=== Hotels and accommodation centers ===
Kazerun has a hotel and several accommodation centers, including numerous ecolodge residences.

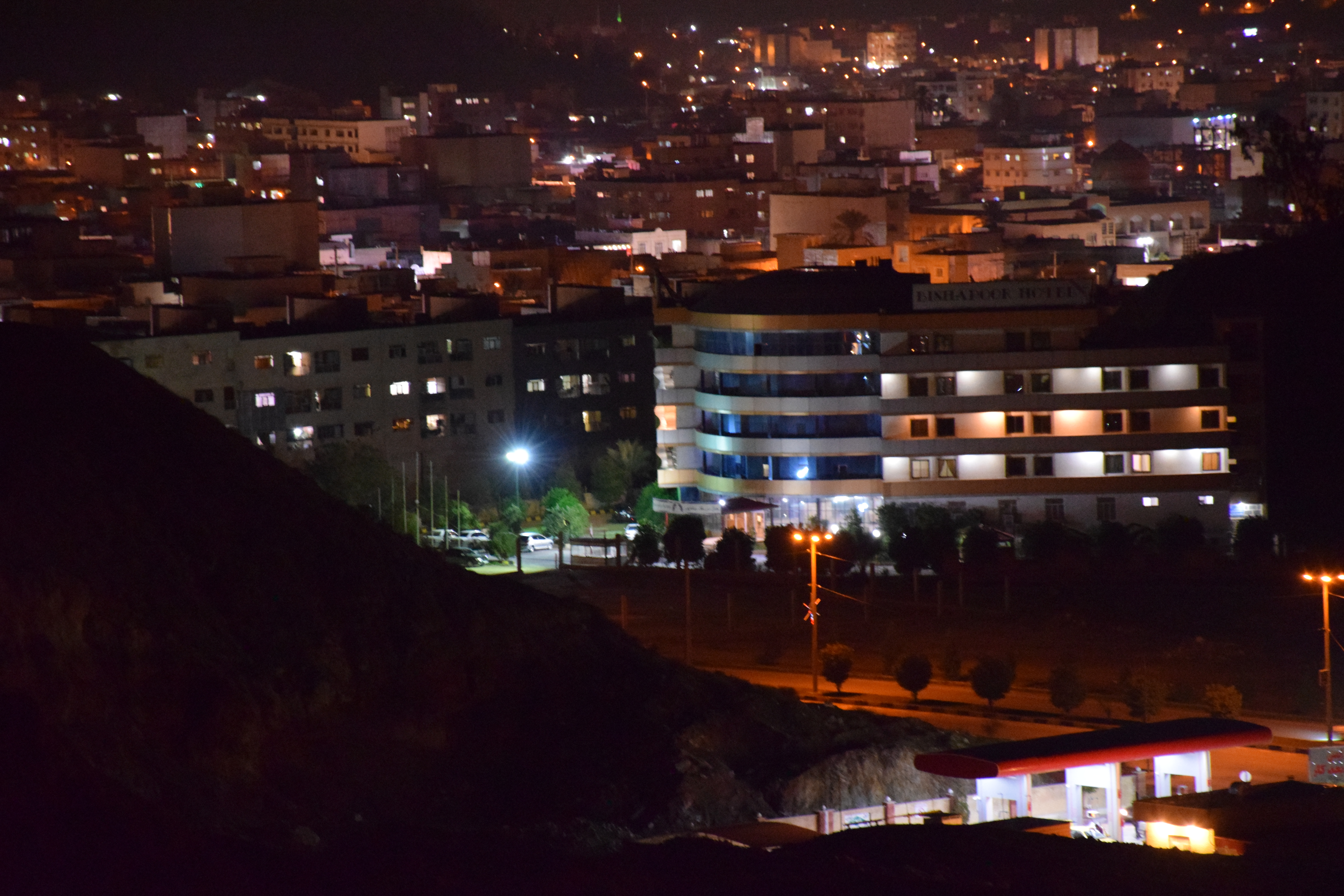
Bishapur hotel of Kazerun

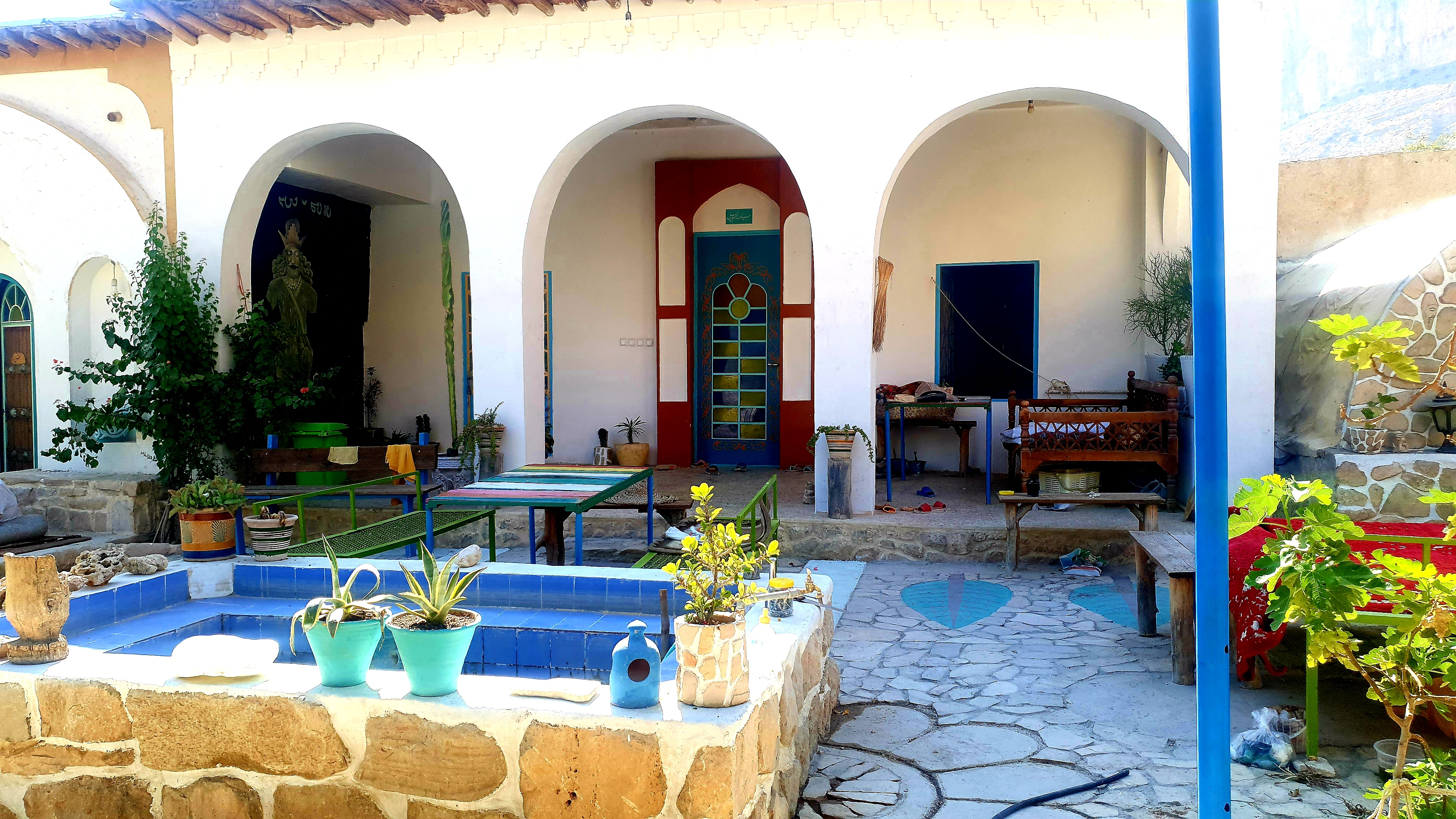
Ecolodge residence in Tang-e Chogan of Kazerun

== Higher education ==
The first higher education centre of Kazerun was established under the supervision of Tehran University of Medical Sciences under the name of Kazerun Health Research Training Station in 1955.

In 1978, Azad University of Iran established a branch in Kazerun, but the activity of this university was stopped with the occurrence of the Islamic Revolution.

At present, six university centers are operating in Kazerun city. Salman Farsi University of Kazerun is known as the scientific hub of west of Fars province. The Islamic Azad University, Kazerun branch, is the only branch of the Islamic Azad University in the southwest of the country, which has its own medical faculty and hospital.

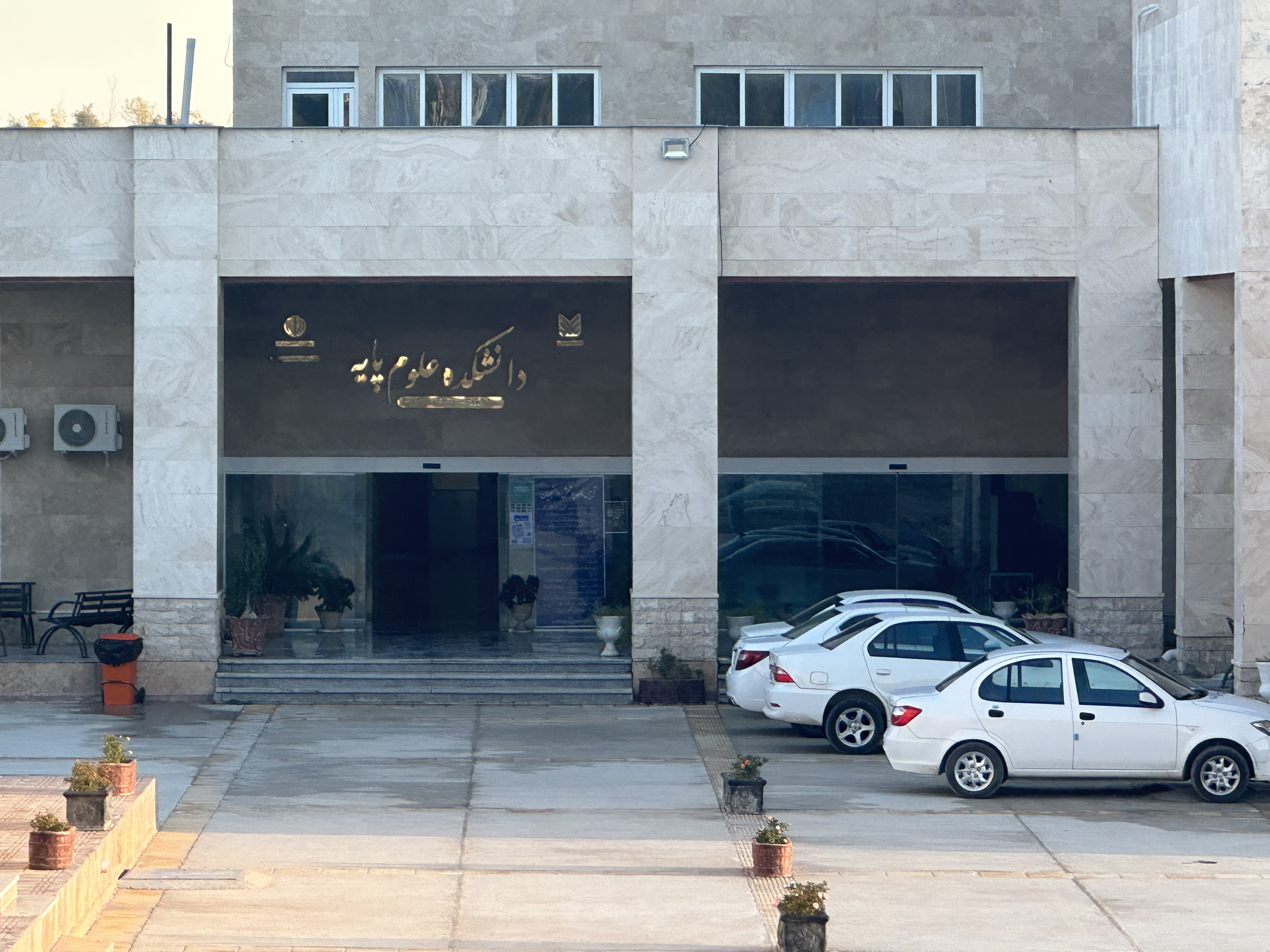
Faculty of Sciences of Salman Farsi University of Kazerun

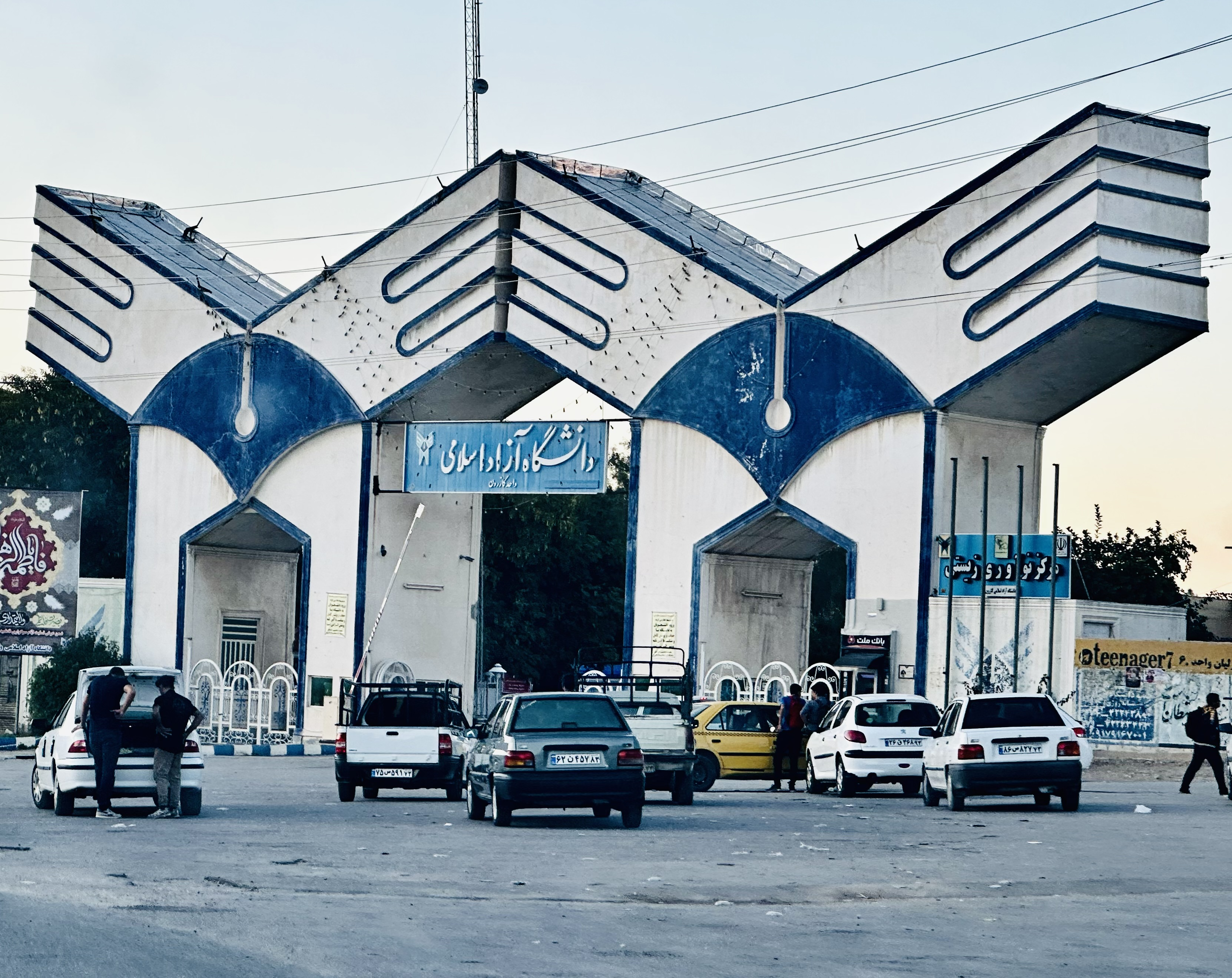
Islamic Azad University, Kazerun branch

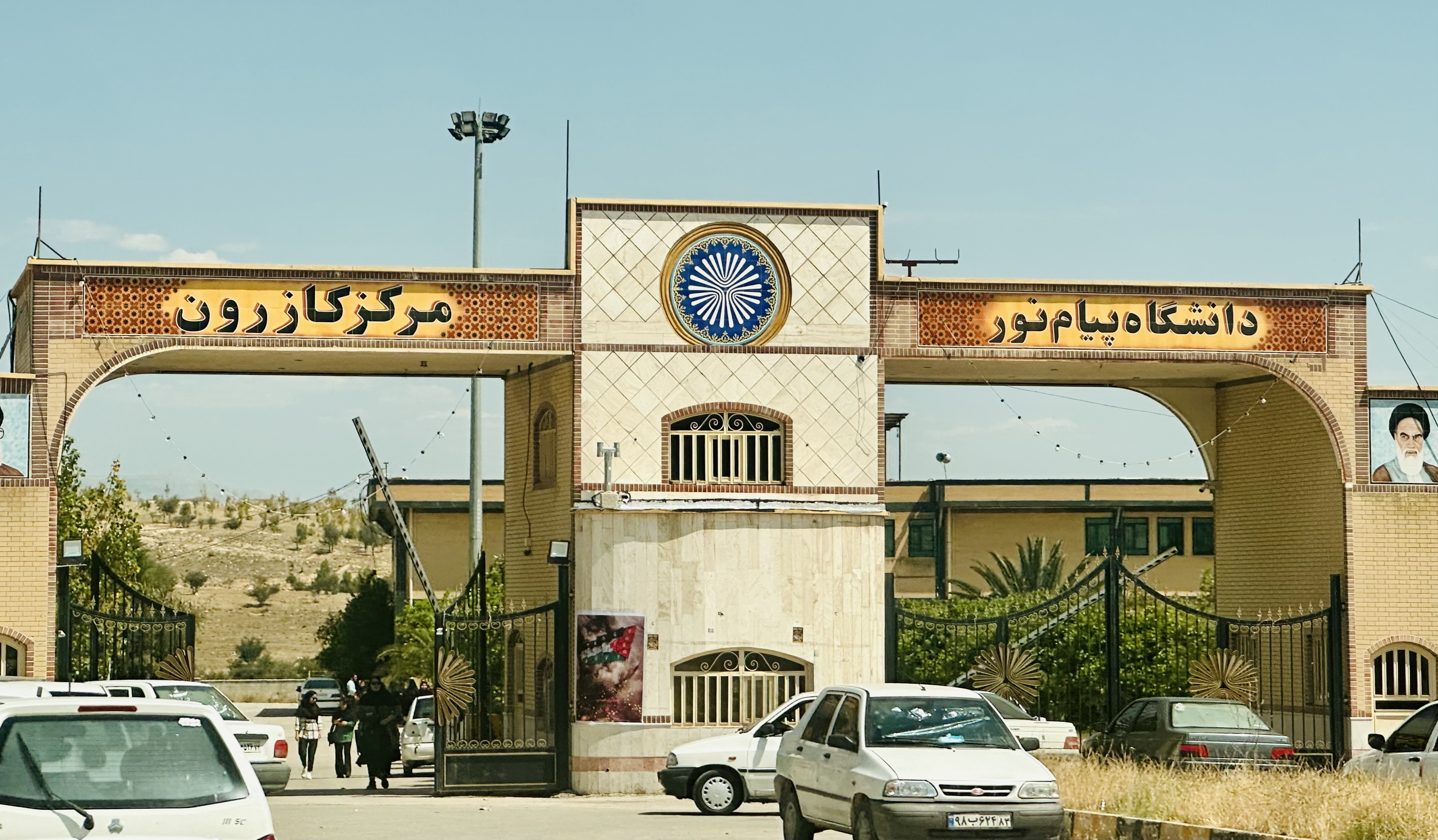
Payame Noor University, Kazerun branch

University name	Established year	Type	Dependency
Salman Farsi University of Kazerun	1993	Public	Ministry of Science, Research and Technology
Islamic Azad University, Kazerun branch	1985	Private	Islamic Azad University
Payame Noor University, Kazerun branch	2000	Public	Payame Noor University
University of Applied Science and Technology, Kazerun branch	2008	Public	University of Applied Science and Technology
Farhangian University, Kazerun branch (Zeinab Kobra)	1983	Public Teacher education	Farhangian University
Skill National University, Kazerun branch (Girls)	1997	Public	National University of Skill

== Economy ==
=== Market ===
In the centuries after Islam, the historical large bazaar of Kazerun was one of the commercial hubs of the south of the country. Even now, this market and other commercial centers of Kazerun are the commercial hub of west of Fars province and cover the main needs of the people of this region.

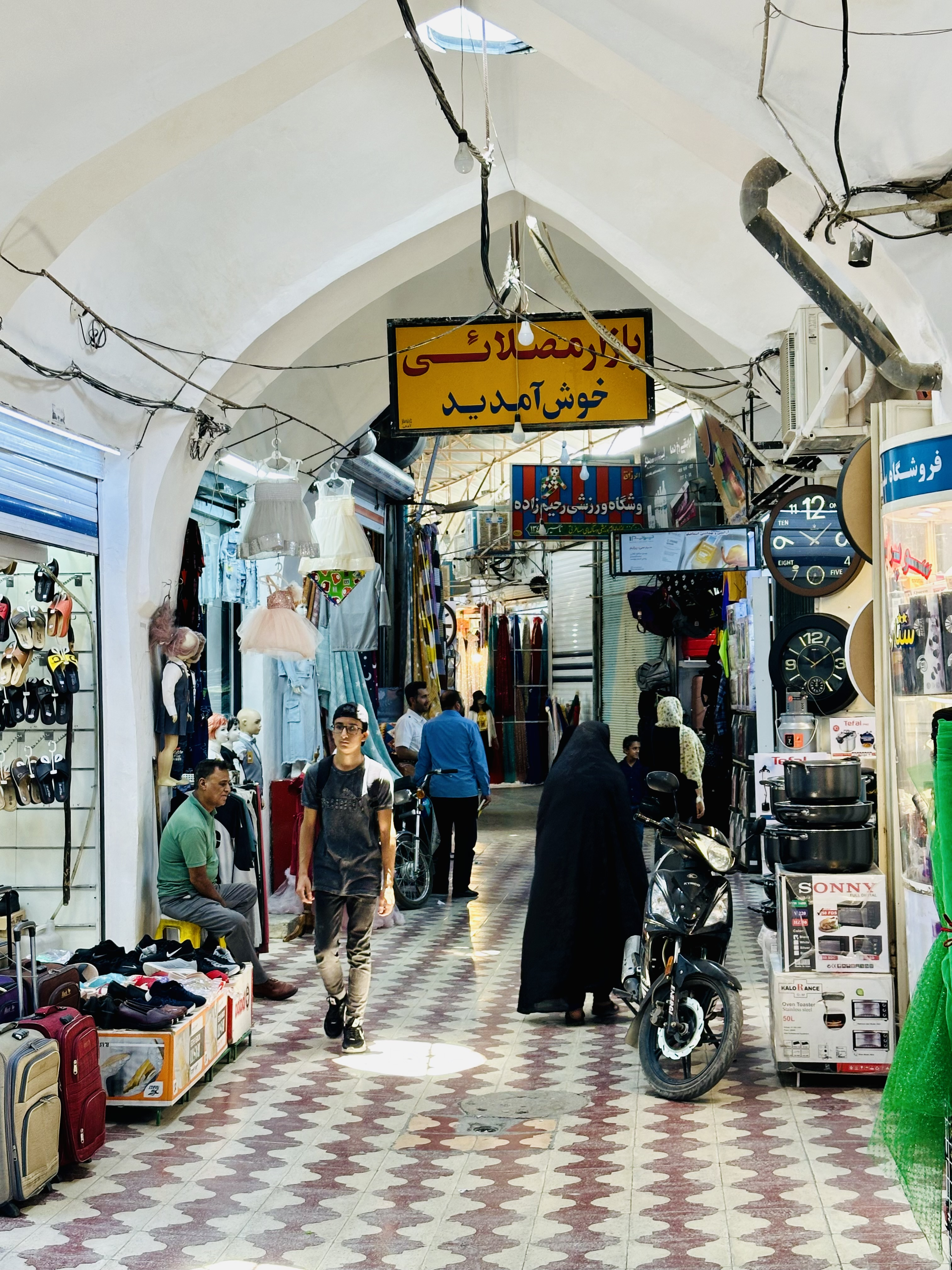
Kazerun Grand Bazaar

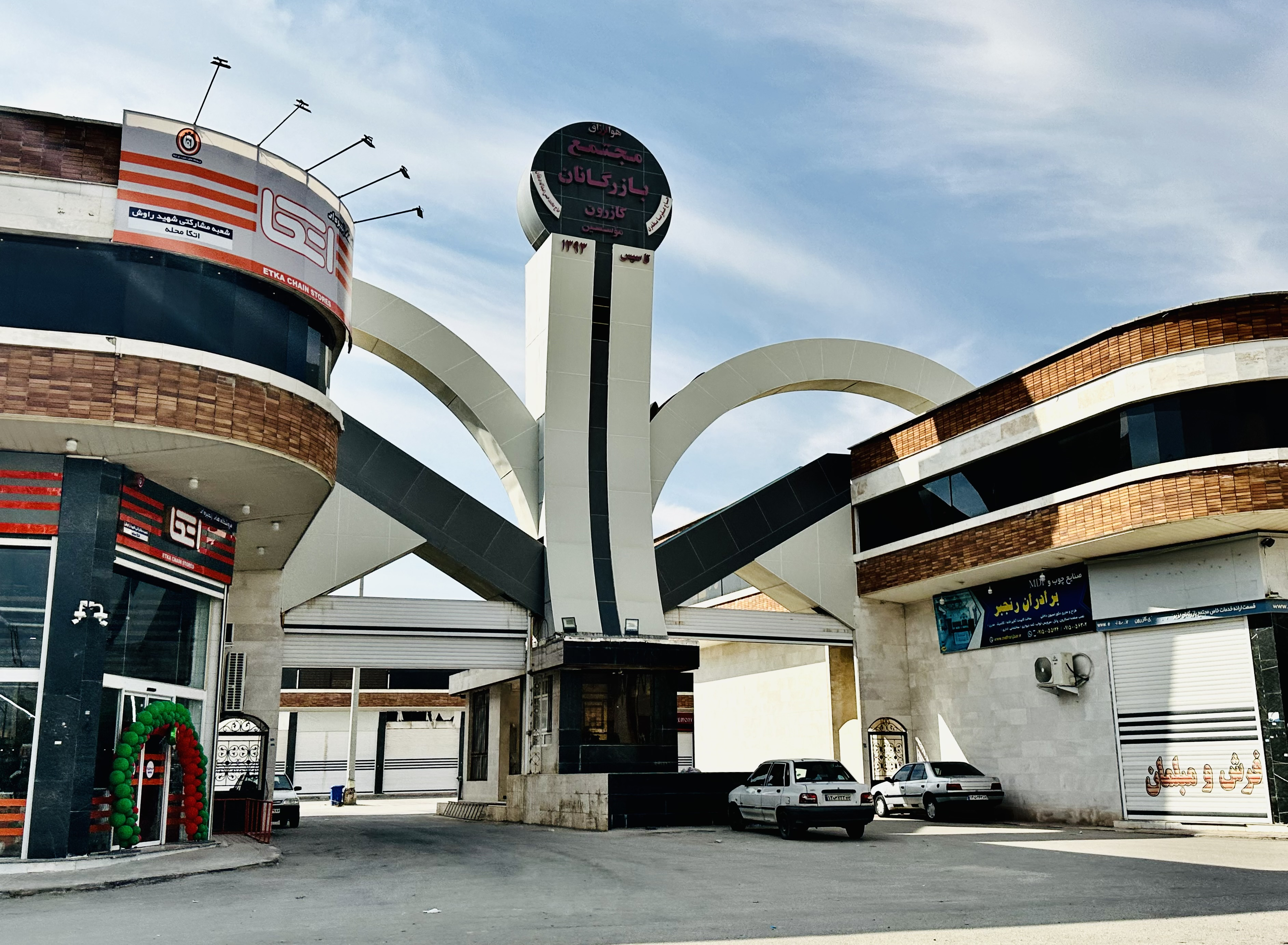
A commercial complex in Kazerun

=== Industry ===
The infrastructure and large industrial units of Kazerun include the following

==== Kazerun Special Economic Zone and Customs ====
Kazerun Special Economic Zone has an area of 183 hectares. So far, 7 big investment contracts have been concluded in this special economic zone. Kazerun Customs is also located in this special economic zone and has made it possible to export and import to other parts of the world.

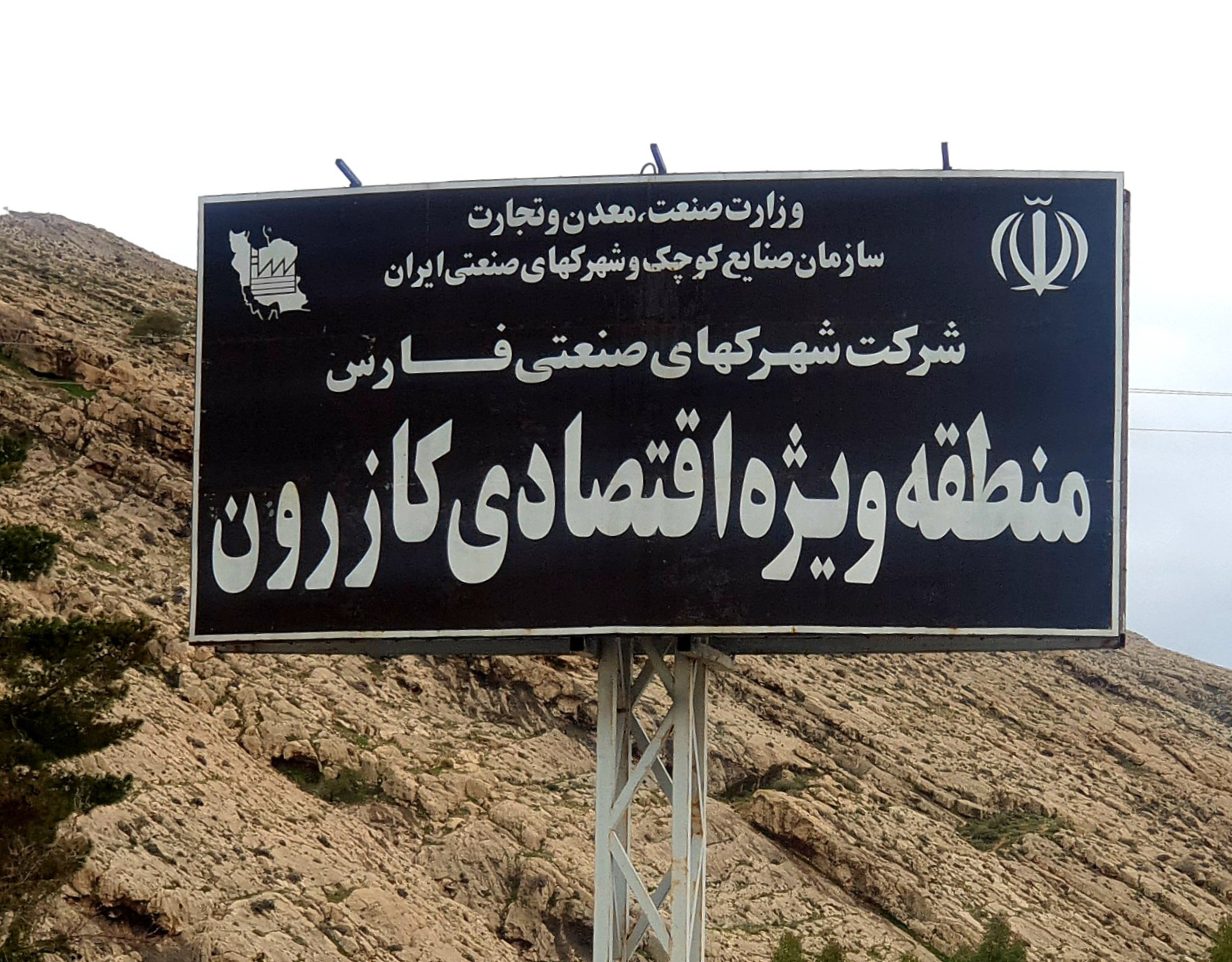
Kazerun Special Economic Zone

==== Khesht Oil Field ====
Currently, the executive operations of the Khesht and Konartakhte oil field are being carried out. and has one billion and 53 million barrels of oil.

==== Shahid Moslehian Industrial Area of Kazerun ====
This industrial area has 48 hectares of industrial land. Currently, 35 production and industrial units with employment of 600 people are active in this industrial area.

==== Kazerun Petrochemical ====
The construction of Kazerun Petrochemical Complex started in 2007 with the aim of producing polyethylene products. This project is currently on hold.

==== Kazerun Combined Cycle Power Plant ====
This combined cycle power plant with a production capacity of 1373 megawatts is the third largest combined cycle power plant in the country.

=== Agriculture ===
Kazerun is one of the agricultural poles of the country, and many of its products are exported to other countries.

==== Fruit and vegetable fields ====
There are two large fields of fruits and vegetables in Kazerun, which supply a huge part of fruits and vegetables in the south of the country.

List of fruit and vegetable fields in Kazerun

Field name	Location
Imam Hossein	West of Kazerun
Kazerun Municipality	East of Kazerun

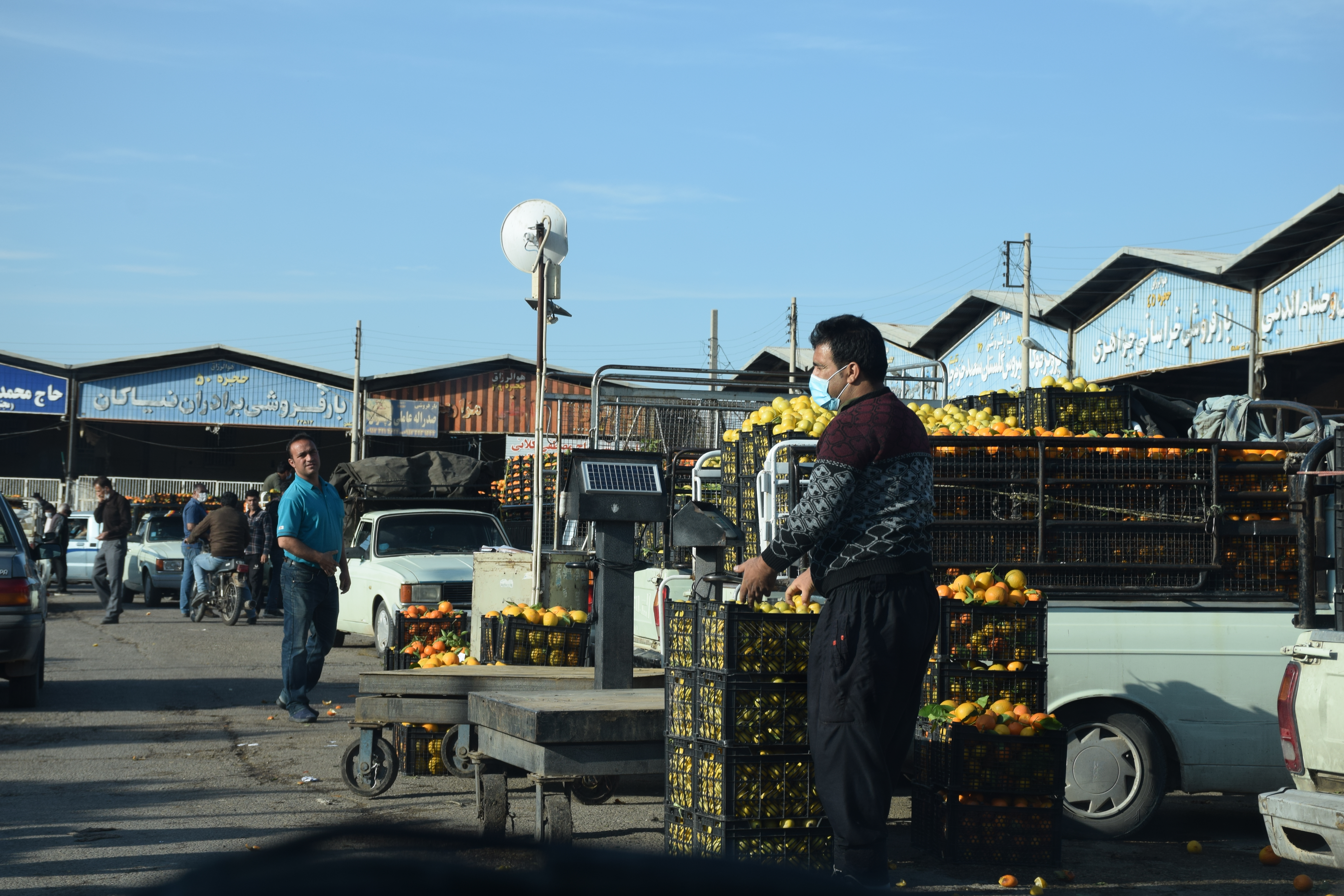
Imam Hossein fruit and vegetable field

==== Agricultural cold storage ====
Kazerun has a total of 36 cold storage units for storing agricultural products.

==== Wheat silo of Kazerun ====
The big wheat storage silo of Kazerun has a capacity of 50,000 tons.

=== Water reserves ===
==== Nargesi Dam ====
Nargesi Dam is one of the big dams under construction by Iran's Ministry of Energy in Kazerun. The purpose of building this dam is to control and contain floods, provide agricultural water for 12 thousand hectares of downstream lands, provide drinking water for the region and water for industry in the cities of Kazerun and Farrashband, including the water needed by Kazerun Petrochemical and the South Zagros industrial area, rehabilitate the Parishan Lake, provide Environmental water and electric energy production is 48.3 gigawatt hours per year.

==== Kazerun Wastewater Treatment Plant ====
Kazerun urban wastewater treatment plant with a current capacity of treating 17100 cubic meters of water per day is located in the south of Kazerun city. The development of Kazerun urban sewage network is currently underway.

== Healthcare system ==
Kazerun Health and Treatment Network is the highest health authority in Kazerun. Before the Islamic Revolution, two Behbahani and Pahlavi hospitals were active in Kazerun, but now both of them are inactive. Currently, two hospitals and several clinics and treatment centers are active in Kazerun city.

=== Hospitals ===
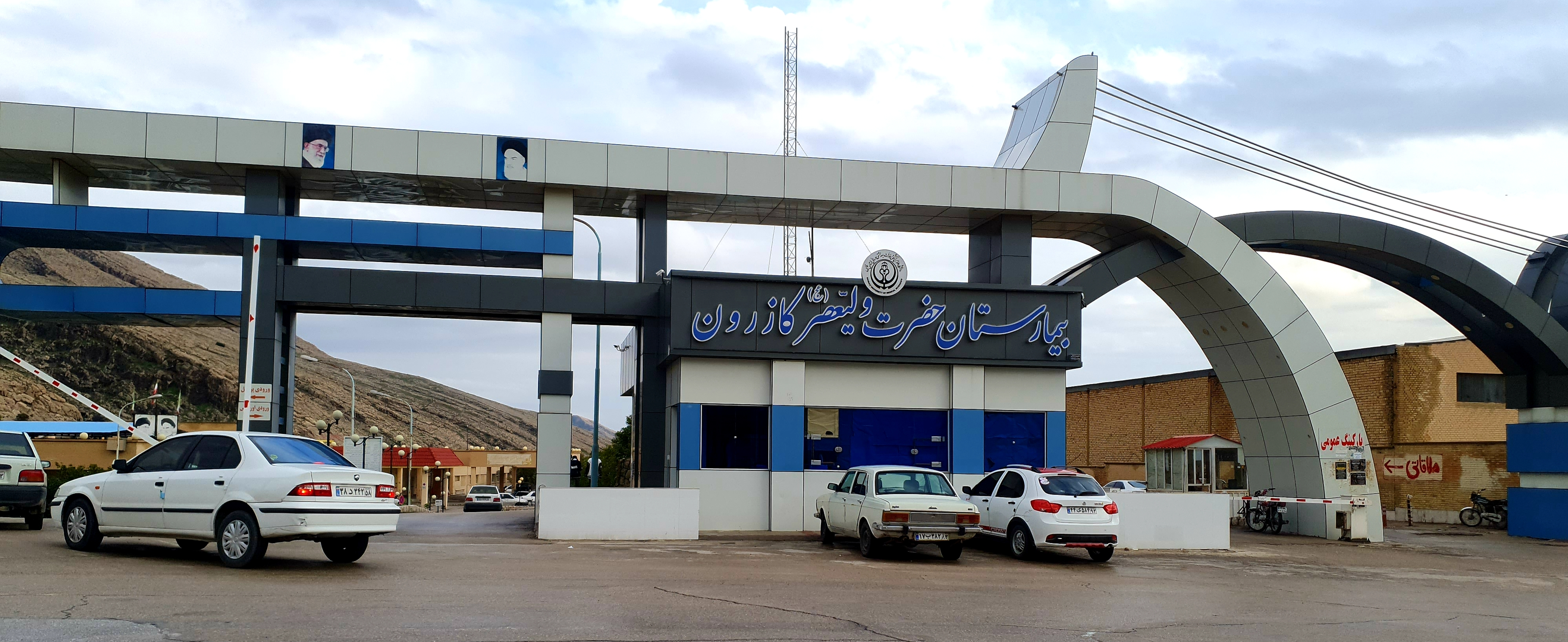
ValieAsr Hospital

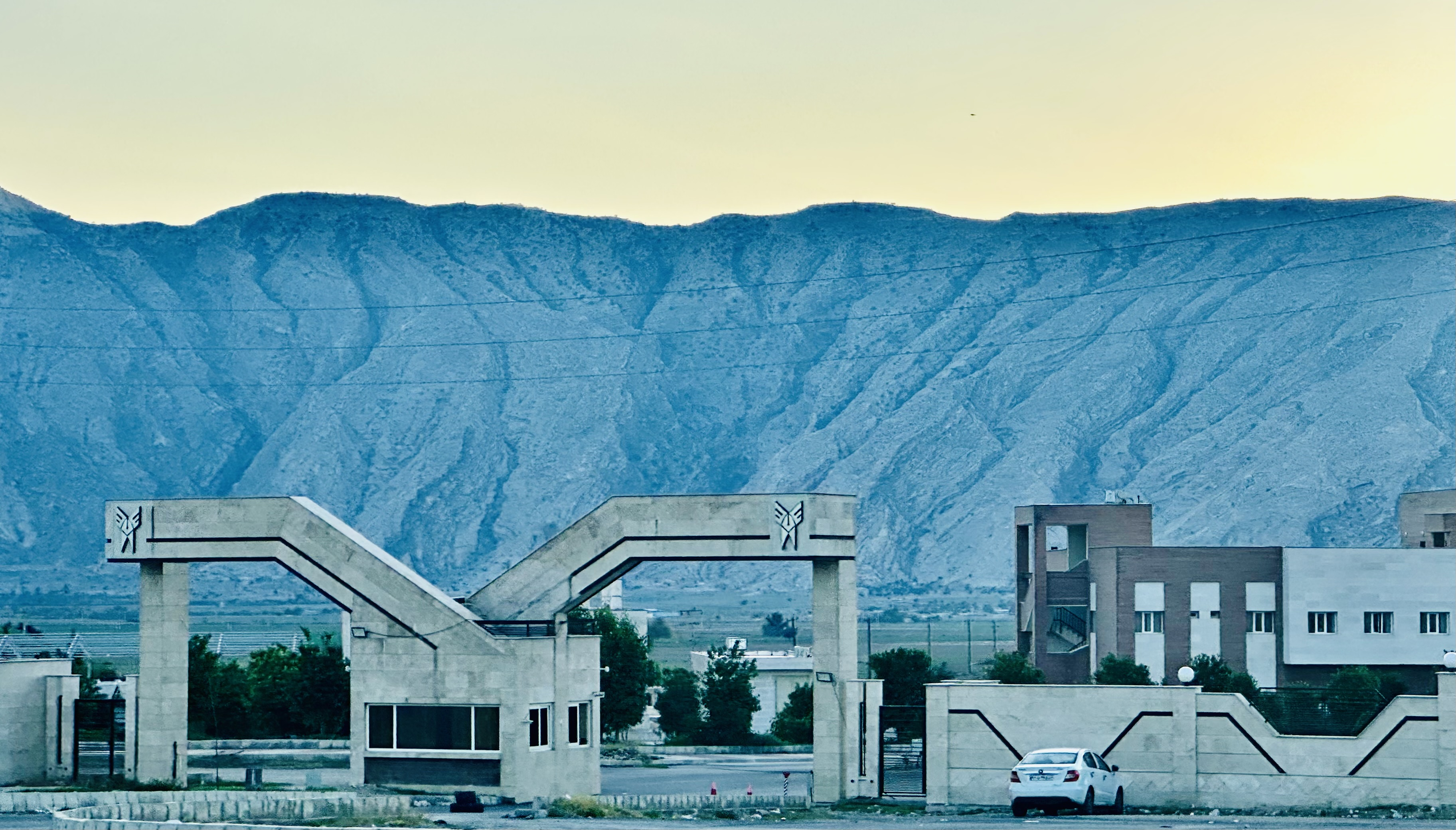
Imam Ali Hospital

Hospital name	Established year	Number of beds	Type
ValieAsr	1996	174	General
Imam Ali	2022	112	General

==== Hospital projects ====
The third and largest hospital of Kazerun with 206 beds is under construction in the southeast of Kazerun city.

=== Kazerun Medical System Organization ===
Kazerun Medical System Organization has 759 members.

=== Emergency bases ===
Emergency 115 Kazerun has two bases in Kazerun city and seven bases in the outskirts of Kazerun (nine bases in total). Kazerun Medical Emergency and Accident Management Center is operating under the supervision of Fars Emergency Organization.

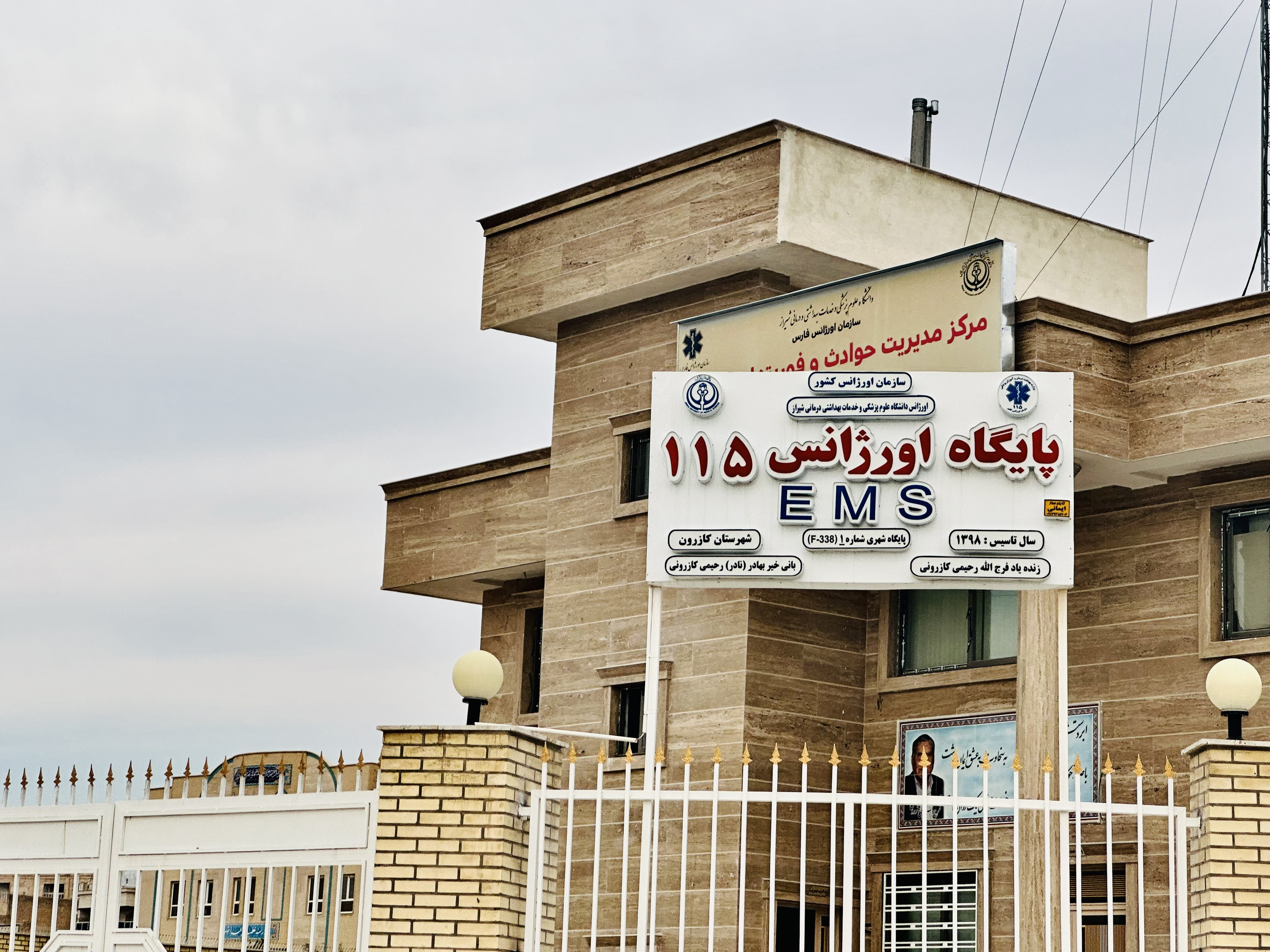
Urban emergency base number 1

== Transportation ==
=== Roads ===
Kazerun is located on the north–south transportation route of the country and has three main entrances and exits on three sides, east, southeast, and west, as well as four secondary exits. The Moharram tunnel and access road construction project is considered the most important active road construction project in Kazerun.

==== East exit ====
In this direction, the city of Kazerun is connected to the center of the country and the cities of Shiraz, Isfahan and Tehran through the Kazerun-Dasht Arjan axis. This route is also touristic and passes through the middle of the forest Barm plain and the edge of Parishan Lake and is considered one of the most beautiful roads in the country.

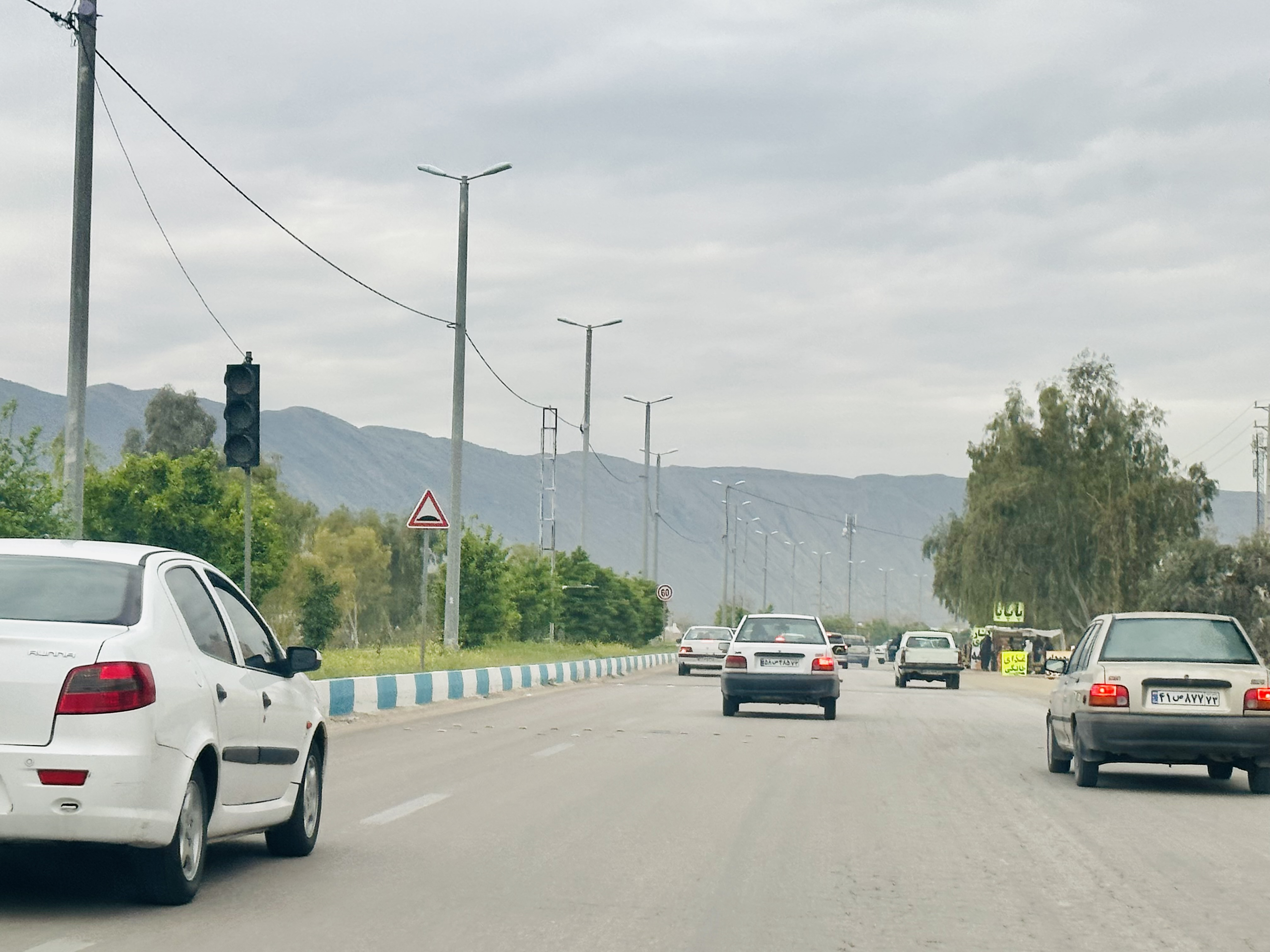
Parishan Blvd. east entrance of Kazerun

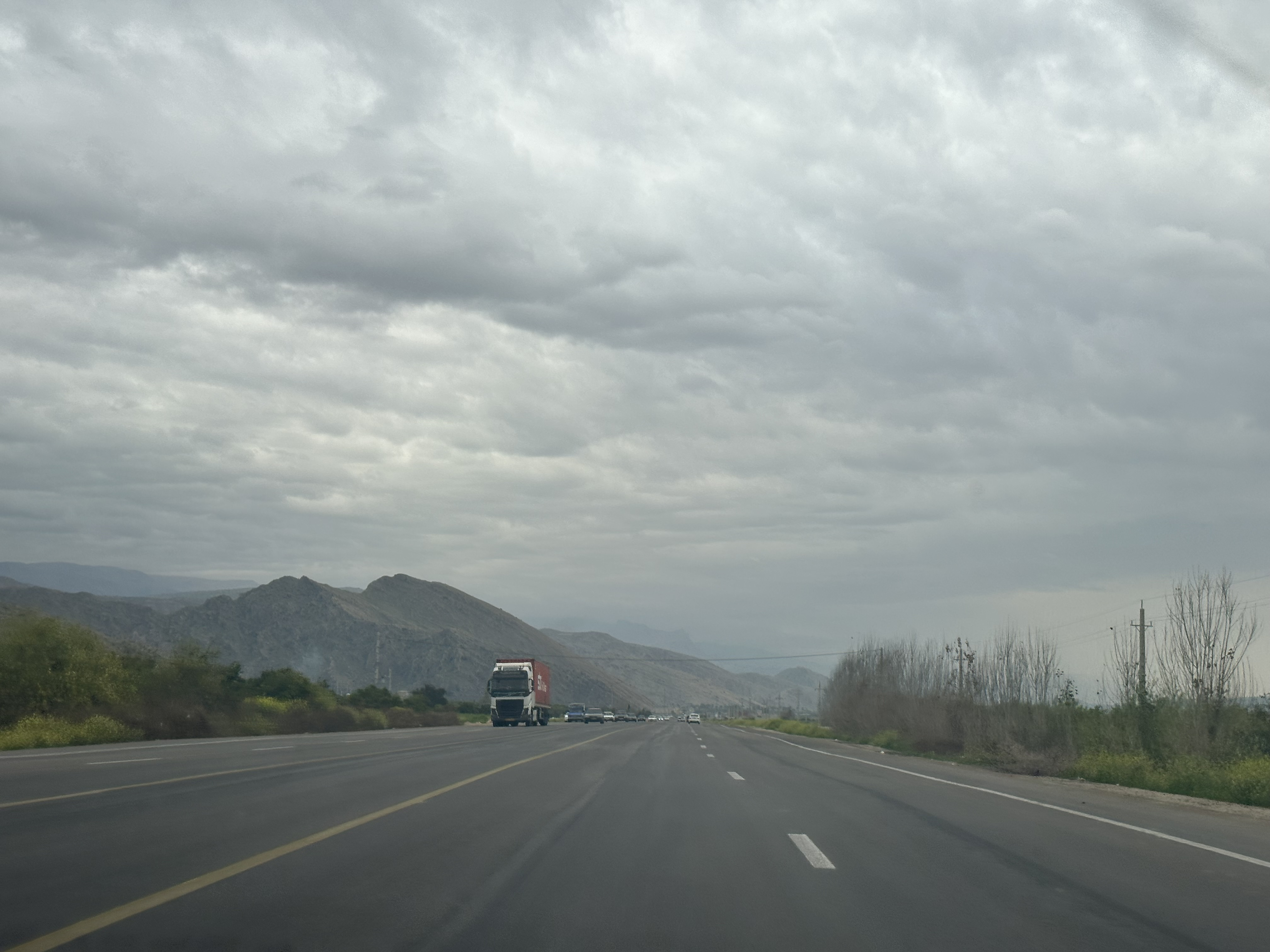
Eastern exit of Kazerun

==== West exit ====
In this direction, the city of Kazerun is connected to the northwestern cities of Fars province and the provinces of Khuzestan, Kohgiluyeh and Boyer-Ahmad and Bushehr through the axis of Kazerun-Qaemiyeh and Kazerun-Rahadar. A part of this route passes through the ancient city of Bishapur and Tang Chogan, which is a UNESCO World Heritage Site.

==== Southeast exit ====
In this direction, the city of Kazerun is connected to the southwestern cities of Fars province and the provinces of Hormozgan and Bushehr through the axis of Kazerun-Baladeh.

==== Moharram tunnel construction project and access roads ====
The construction project of Moharram tunnel and access roads started in 2009 in Kazerun-Kanaratakhte axis and is still ongoing. This project has facilitated the access of Kazerun city to the south of the country and can send a part of the passing traffic from the north to the south of the country to this city.

==== Secondary exits ====
Kazerun also has four secondary exits, two exits to Davan village, one exit to Qaleh-ye Seyyed village and one exit to Golestan village.

=== Passenger terminal ===
Shahre Sabz passenger terminal affiliated with Kazerun Municipality is operating in this city.

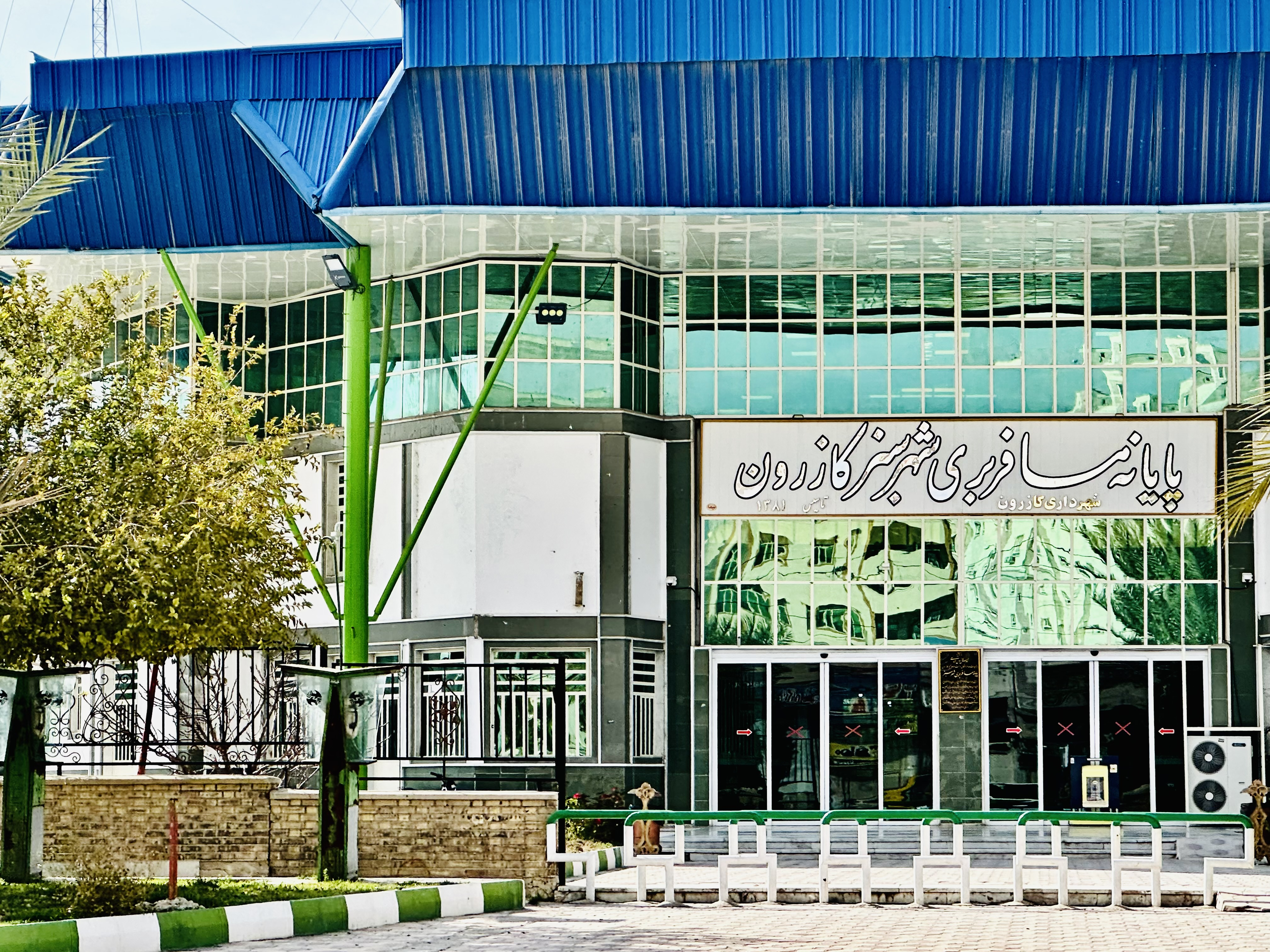
Shahre Sabz passenger terminal

=== Intra-city transportation ===
==== City buses ====
Currently, 22 buses and three minibuses are serving the citizens of Kazerun and its suburbs under the supervision of Kazerun Municipal Transportation Management Organization.

== Sport ==
Handball is the first sport of Kazerun and this city is considered one of the poles of handball in the country. Other popular and long-standing sports in Kazerun include football, wrestling, cycling, basketball, volleyball, and Pahlevani and zoorkhaneh rituals.

=== Sport clubs ===
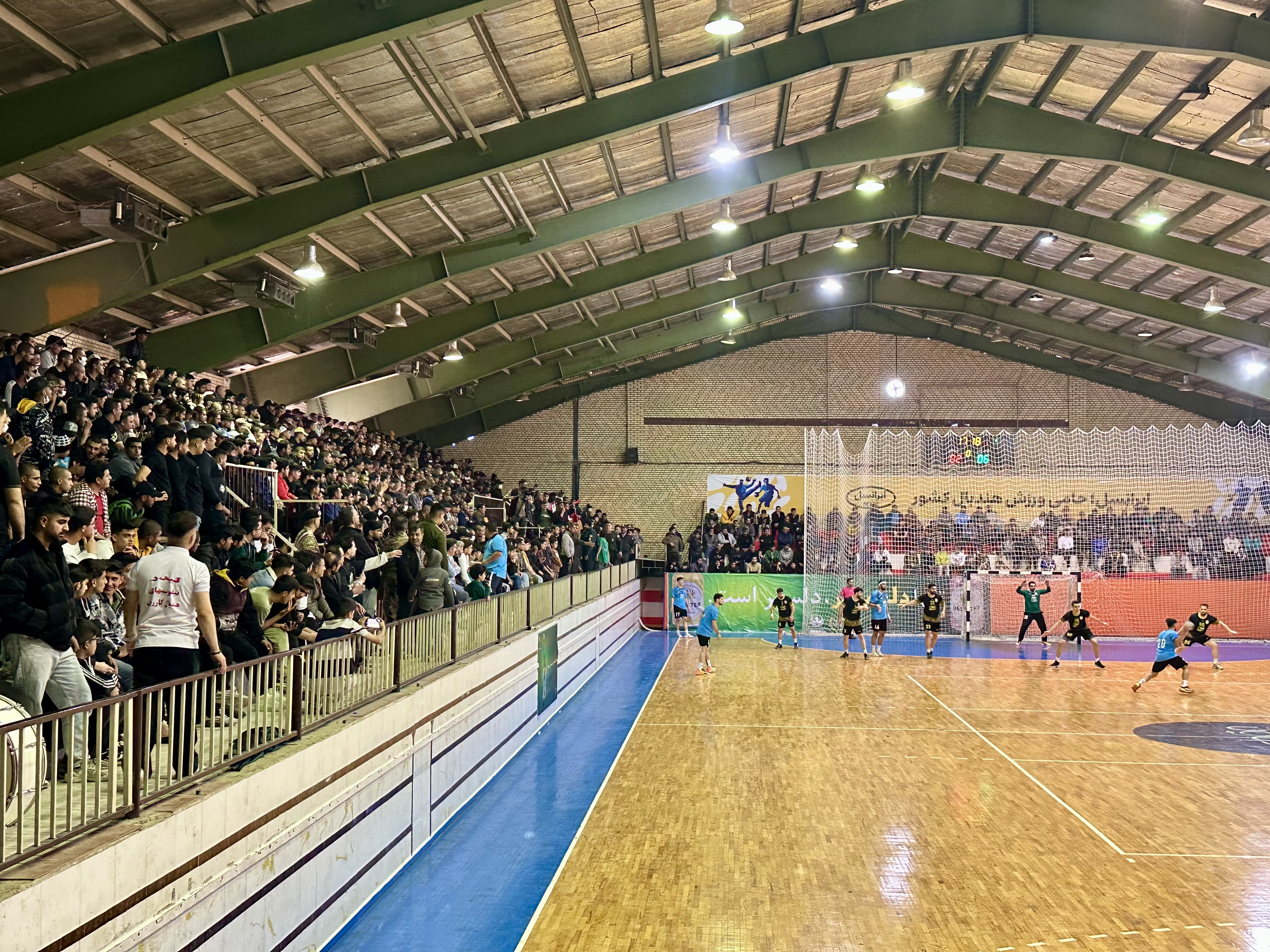
Niroo Zamini Club of Kazerun in Iran Men's Premier Handball League - February 2025

The most prominent sports teams of Kazerun are currently two teams Niroo Zamini of Kazerun in the Iran Men's Premier Handball League and Zagros Jonoubi of Kazerun in the Iran Women's Premier Handball League. The venue for the home games of these two teams is the 2500 people Takhti Hall (Kazerun Handball Hall). Kazerun Handball has participated in the men's and women's premier league under different names over the past years and has a history of winning several championships and vice-championships and advancing to the Asian Club League Handball Championship. Kazerun's men's handball teams, despite advancing to the Asian Club Cup competitions six times, have participated in these competitions only twice, and women's teams have not participated in these competitions, despite being promoted three times, which was mainly due to financial problems.

The top titles of Kazerun men's handball teams in the Premier League are as follows.

Club name	Year	Rank	Situation
Shahrdari Kazerun	2017	2nd	Promotion to the Asian Club Cup
Niroo Zamini Shahid Shameli of Kazerun	2019	2nd	Promotion to the Asian Club Cup
Niroo Zamini Shahid Shameli of Kazerun	2020	1st	Promotion to the Asian Club Cup
Niroo Zamini Shahid Shameli of Kazerun	2021	2nd	Promotion to the Asian Club Cup
Niroo Zamini Shahid Shameli of Kazerun	2022	2nd	Promotion to the Asian Club Cup
Niroo Zamini Shahid Shameli of Kazerun	2023	2nd	Promotion to the Asian Club Cup
Niroo Zamini of Kazerun	2025	3rd	-

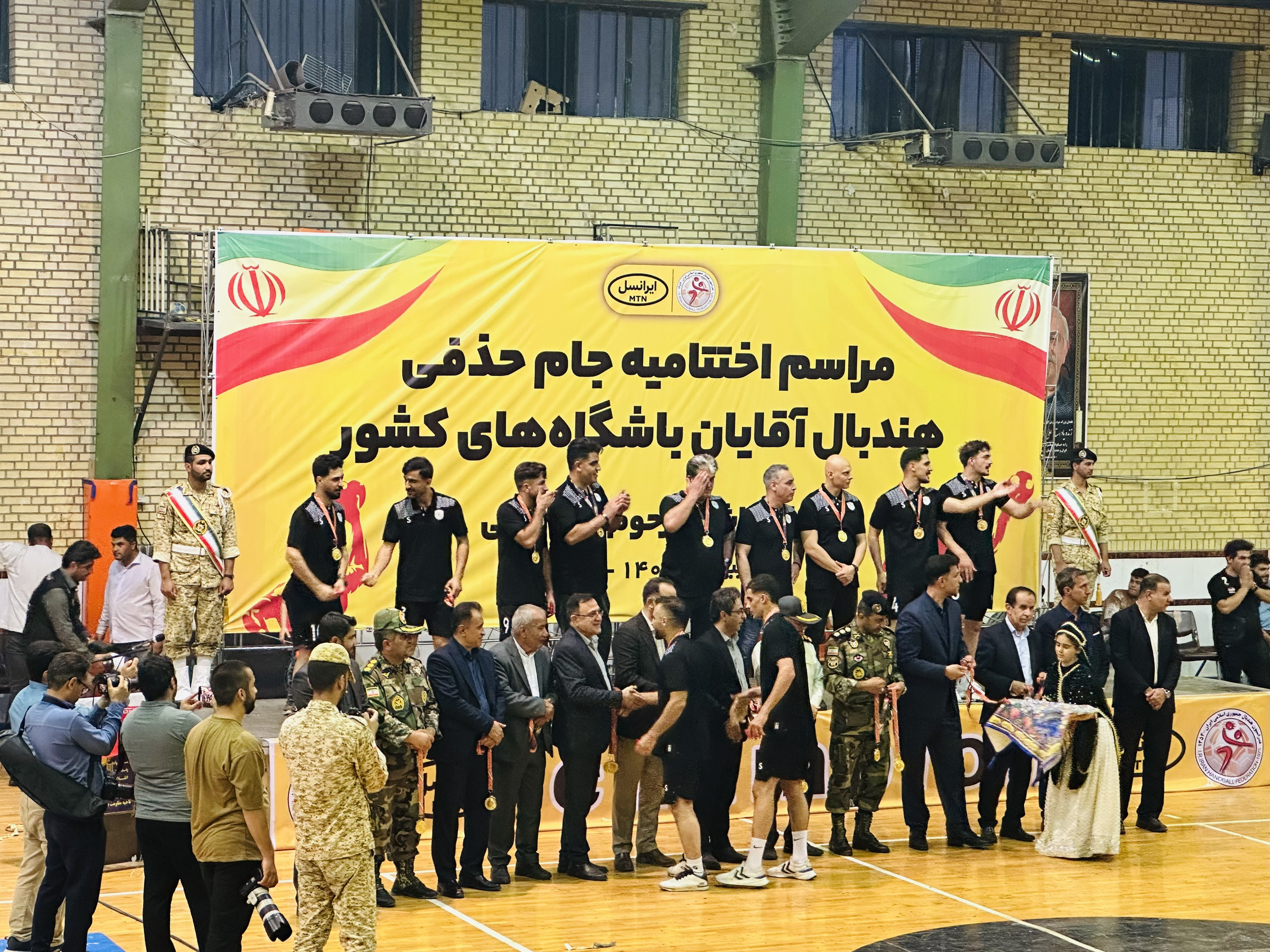
Championship and medal award ceremony for the Niroo Zamini Club of Kazerun in the Iranian Handball Hazfi Cup - April 2025

The top titles of Kazerun men's handball teams in the Hazfi Cup are as follows.

Club name	Year	Rank	Situation
Niroo Zamini of Kazerun	2025	1st	Promotion to the Asian Club Cup

The presence of Kazerun men's handball teams in the Asian Clubs Cup:

Club name	Year	Rank	Host
Niroo Zamini Shahid Shameli of Kazerun	2021	9th	Saudi Arabia
Niroo Zamini Shahid Shameli of Kazerun	2023	8th	Iran

The top titles of Kazerun women's handball teams in the Premier League:

Club Name	Year	Rank	Situation
Shahid Shameli of Kazerun	2019	2nd	Promotion to the Asian Club Cup
Shahid Shameli of Kazerun	2020	2nd	Promotion to the Asian Club Cup
Shahid Shameli of Kazerun	2021	3rd	-
Shahid Shameli of Kazerun	2022	2nd	Promotion to the Asian Club Cup
Zagros Jonoubi of Kazerun	2023	3rd	-

=== Sports complexes ===
Shohada Stadium of Kazerun, as the largest sports complex in the west of Fars province is the main venue of Kazerun sports teams. There are other sports complexes focusing on different sports fields in Kazerun.

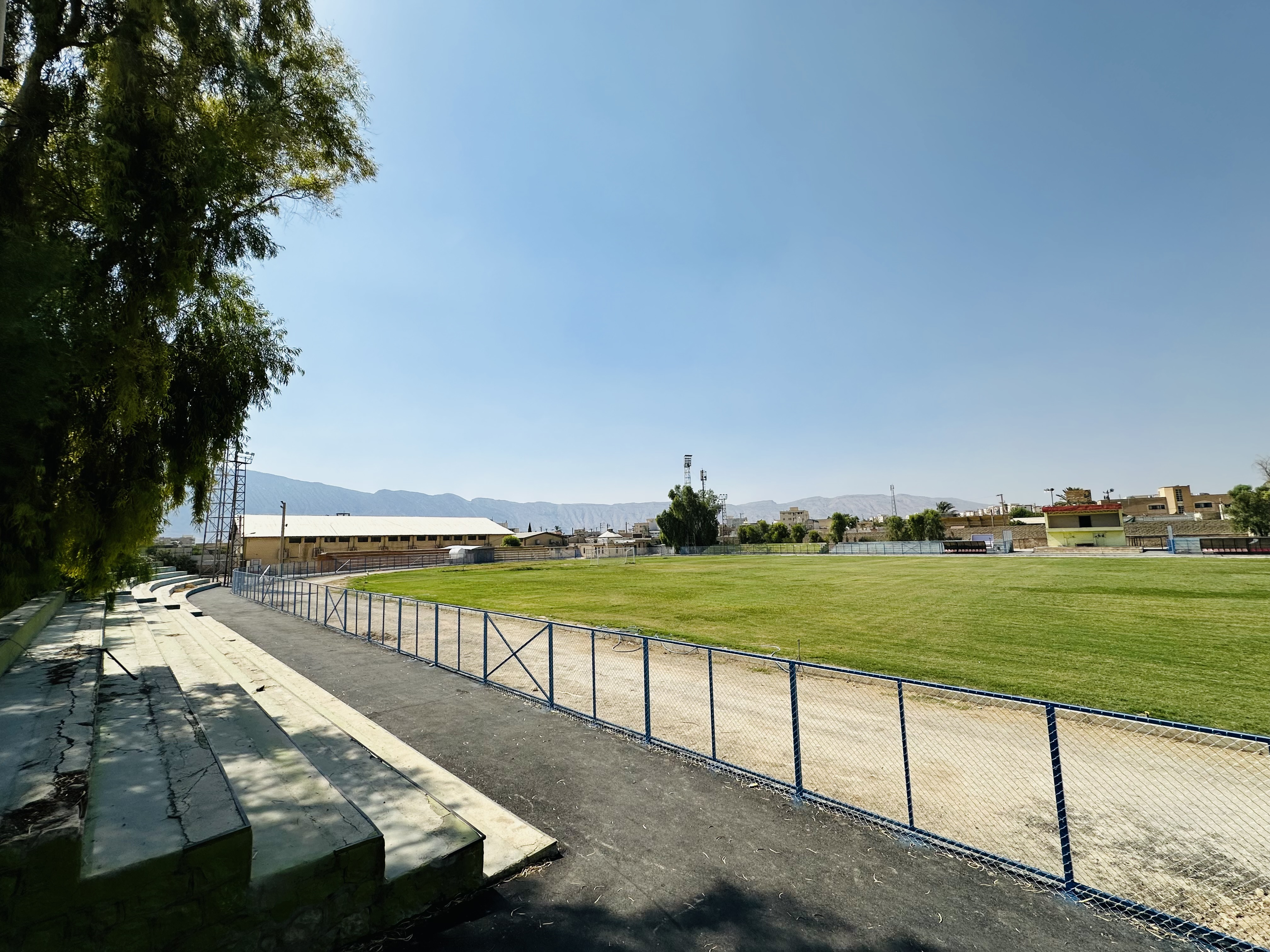
Shohada Stadium of Kazerun

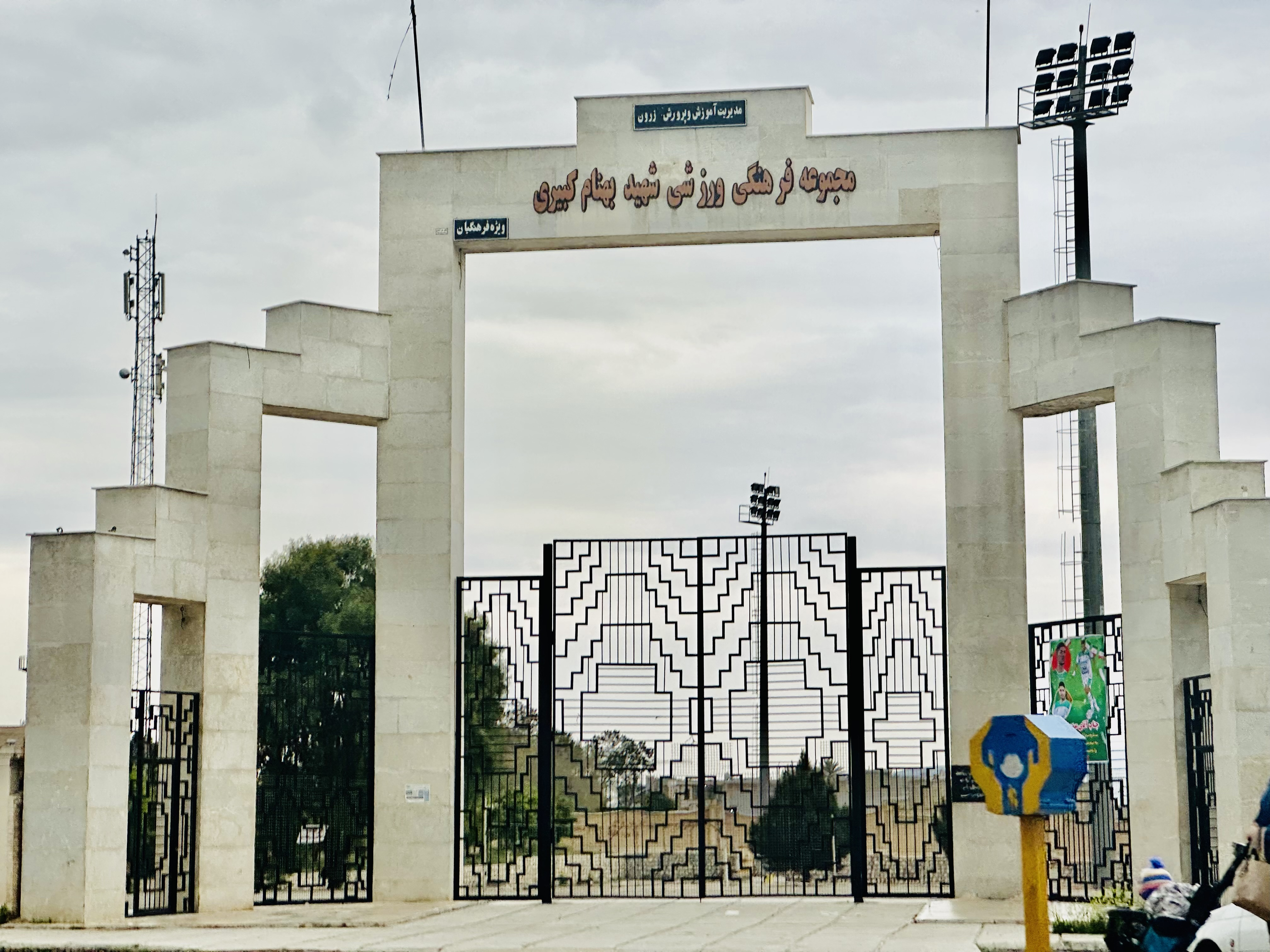
A sports complex in Kazerun

== Places of interest ==
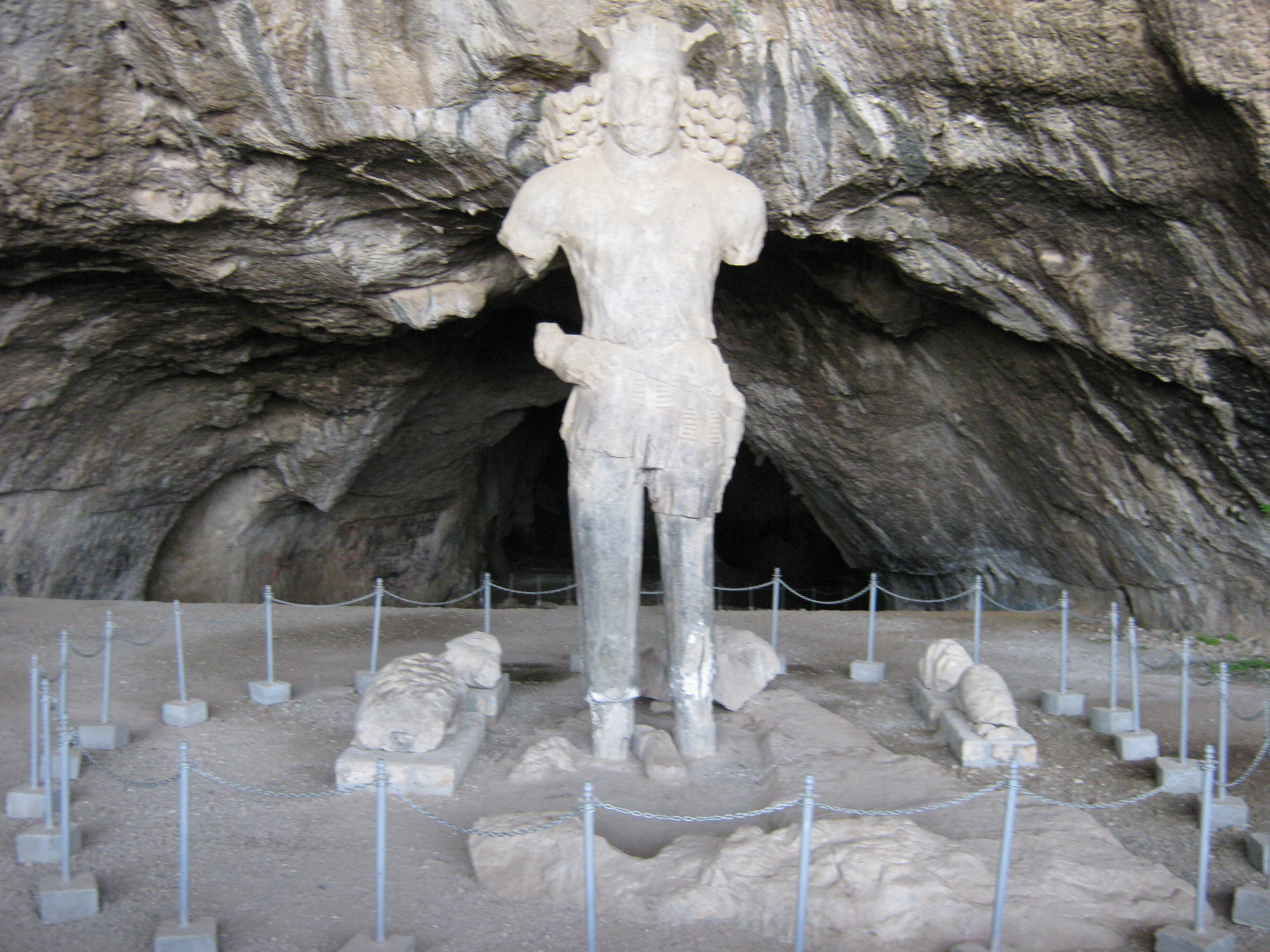
Shapur statue

- Parishan Lake, near Kazerun
- Shapur River
- Shapur statue (the largest statue of ancient Iran), near Bishapur
- National park Dašt-e Aržan, a vast green meadow on Kazerun–Shiraz highway

== Recreational places ==
Barm Plain is the biggest plain of oaks in Iran.

Davan, Sarmashhad and Kaskan are three villages in Kazeroon.

The old name of Kazerun was "Green City".

== Ashura and Tasua re-enactment ==
Held annually on the ninth and tenth days of Muharram (Tasu'a and Ashura), this public reenactment of the Battle of Karbala is among the most notable in Iran. The outdoor theatrical performances run from morning unril noon, accompanied by citywide street processions commemorating the historical event.

== Sister cities ==
- Al-Mada'in, Iraq

== Notable people ==
Nasrollah Mardani, a famous contemporary Persian poet, is from Kazeroon. It is also believed that Salman the Persian, a companion of the Islamic prophet Muhammad, comes from this city. Haj Sadrallah Zamanian was a pillar of the community for many years. The town is also the scene of a famous battle in the novel My Uncle Napoleon. Kazeroon is a city of Science. Qotb al-Din Kazerooni, Allame Jalaladdin Davani, Allame Ali Davani are from Kazeroon. The mothers of Hafez and Saadi were also from Kazeroon. Firouz Naderi, (the associate director of NASA's Jet Propulsion Laboratory (JPL), responsible for Project Formulation and Strategy), was born in Kazeroon. Reza Malekzadeh, a medical scientist and gastroenterologist who is well known in Iran is from Kazeroon.

== See also ==
- Old Kazeruni dialect
- Media related to Kazerun at Wikimedia Commons

Kazeroon travel guide from Wikivoyage
