= Bristol Caverns =

Show cave in Tennessee

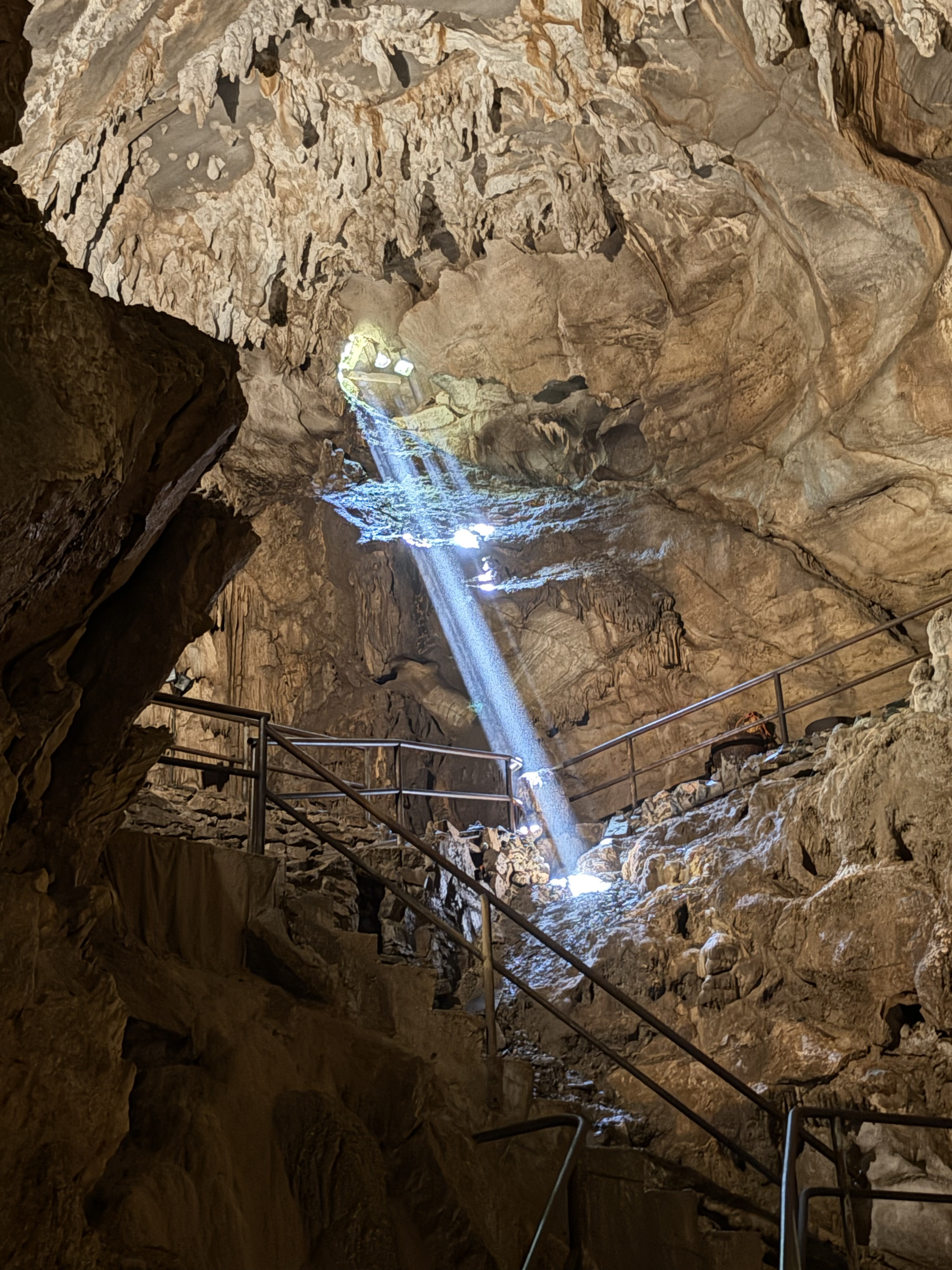
- Interactive map of Bristol Caverns
- Coordinates: 36.550381°N 82.121342°W
- Length: 1.52 miles
- Entrances: 6
- Access: Show cave
- Website: https://bristolcaverns.com

Bristol Caverns is a show cave in Bristol, Tennessee. It is a karst cave. The caverns have been owned by several people and companies since their discovery, and has been a show cave since the mid-1900s.

== History ==
The exact date of Bristol Caverns' discovery is unknown, as the natural entrance was an open pit, which has since been covered with a concrete pad and iron grate. The entrances that are currently viable are man-made entrances, the first constructed in 1863 by a farmer named Samuel Sesler with the intention of using the cave as a root cellar, as was common practice at the time. The Sesler family used the cave till the late 1920s, when it was sold to Alexander Hitt. He contracted with the Civilian Conservation Corps and the TVA, as well as working with the Twin City of Bristol TN, VA, to build the pathways for tours between 1936 and 1947, when the cave opened to the public for tours. The construction of the current gift shops was completed in 1963 and remains largely unaltered.

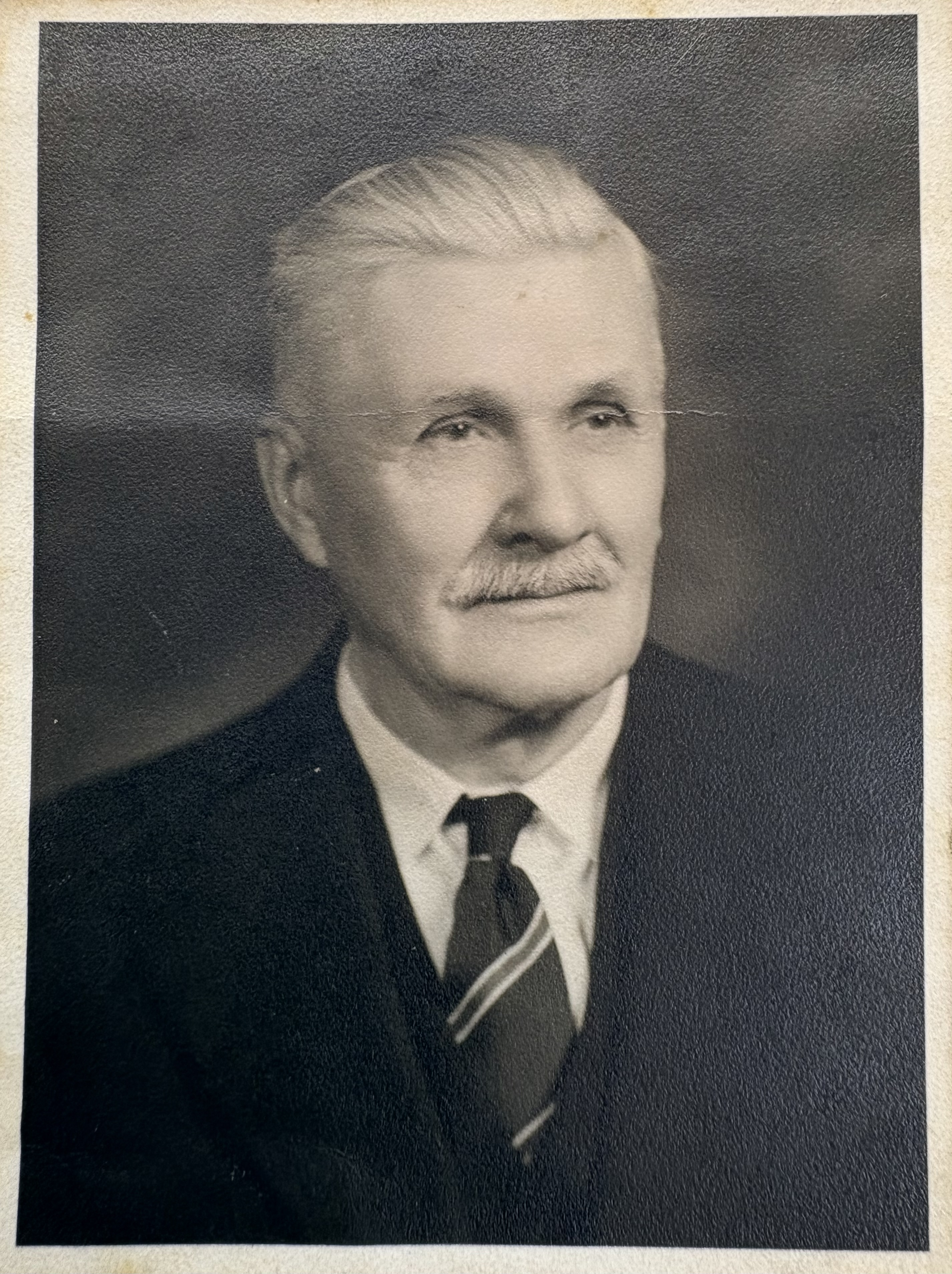
1941 photo of Samuel Sesler, Jr.

The cave has changed ownership many times over the years; however, records were poorly kept, and the exact number of subsequent owners is unknown. The cave was first owned by the Sesler family around 1863 and was later sold to Mr. Hit, who developed it for tourism and sold it to M.T. McArthur for $19,750 in 1956. Ownership of the cave was obtained by Roy Davis, founder of Cumberland Caverns, sometime before 1963. At some point after 1963, the cave came into the ownership of the Mensh Investment and Development Associates Inc. and was then sold to the Hatcher family in 1965. They owned and operated it until selling it to the Barnett family in 1982. The Barnett family put the property up for sale in 2021.

The cave has been widely used as an educational tool since the 1960s by local schools. In one case, 66 students from the Academy of Immaculate Conception at Opelousas, Louisiana, visited on their way to Washington, D.C. in 1962 after the completion of a local rail line.

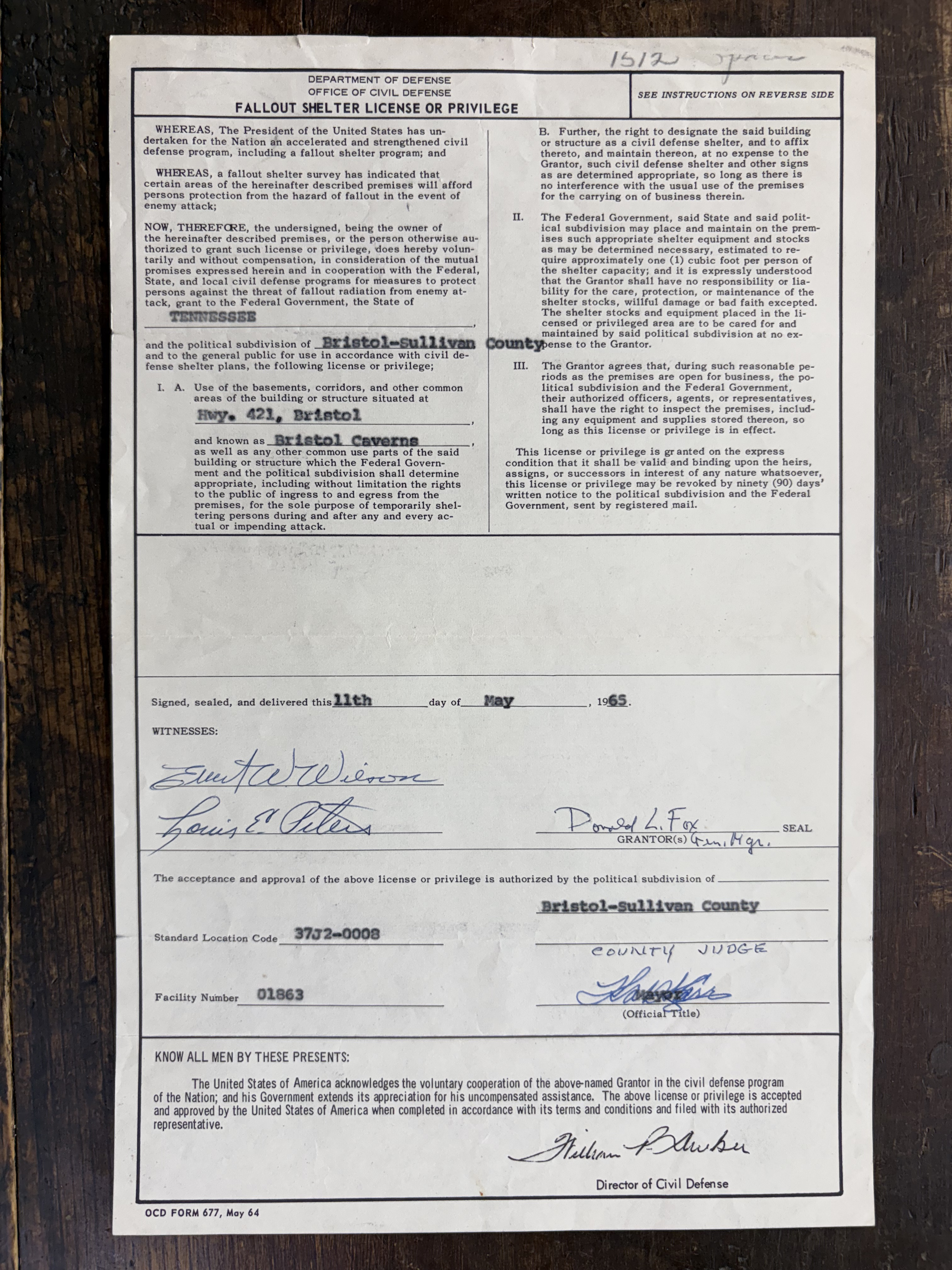
Fallout shelter license or privileges of Bristol Caverns

In 1963, during the Cold War, Bristol Caverns was designated as a fallout shelter. The fallout shelter program was discontinued in the late 1970s.

As with many historic attractions, there are some unconfirmed or disproven stories or myths about Bristol Caverns. The oldest story about the cave is that Native American groups used the cave to hide from early settlers after stealing from them, but there is no evidence of this. Another unconfirmed story is that someone was killed and thrown into the natural entrance. The first name of the victim varies, as do the circumstances of the murder: the name of the victim was Betsy or Betty Bishop, and the stories say she was either a young girl killed by two boys or a widow killed by a jealous neighbor, and was then thrown into the cave, and her body was discovered when it was washed out by the creek. The early name of the cave was Bishop's Cave, and people say this was why.

Another myth about Bristol Caverns states that it connects to another cave in Abingdon, Virginia. This is untrue, as the cave was completely mapped once in the 1950s and again in the early 1980s.

== Topography and geology ==
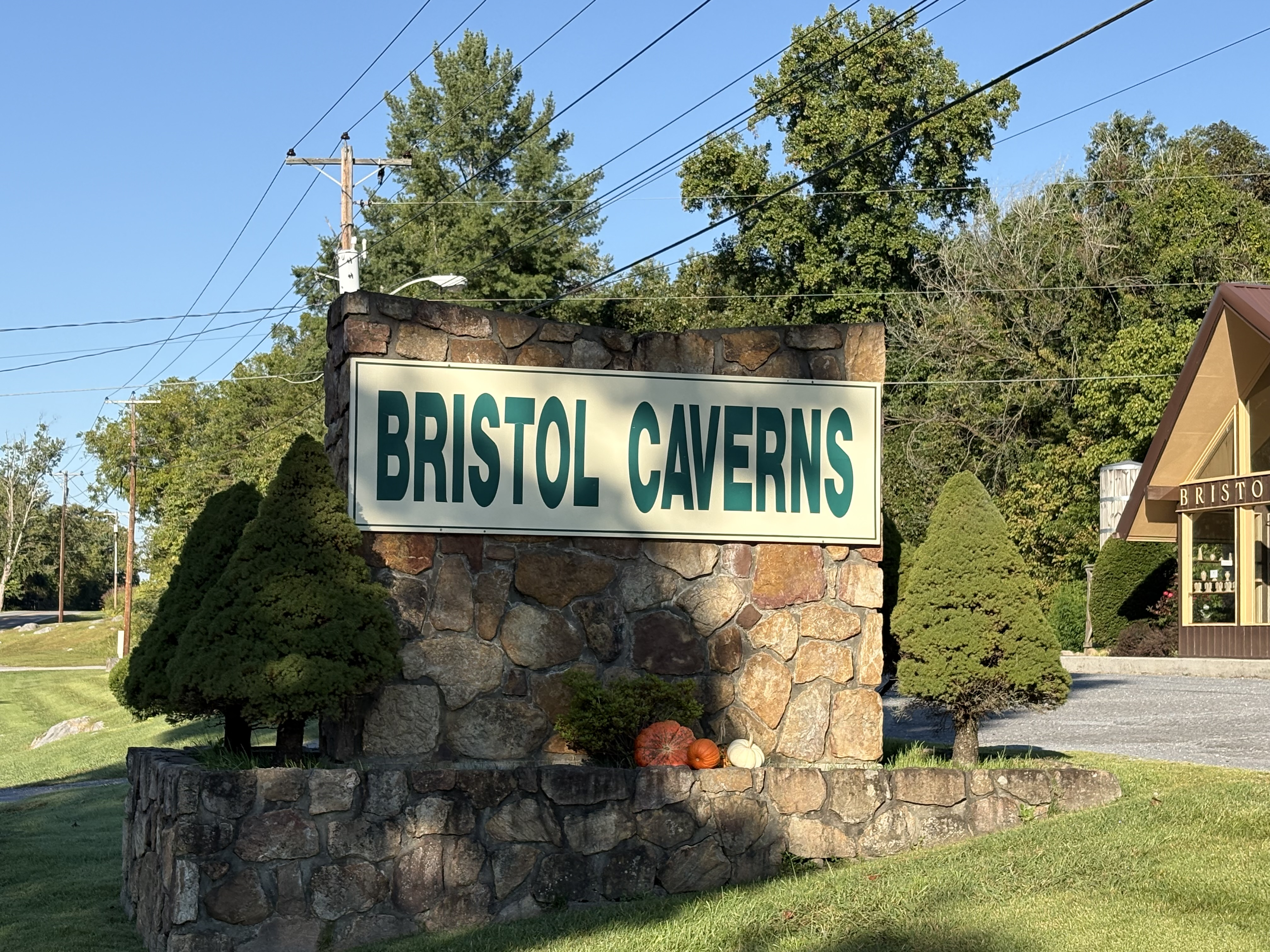
The sign outside the Bristol Caverns building

According to the Tennessee Cave Survey files, Bristol Caverns is 130 feet deep and 1.52 miles long. The area around Bristol Caverns has many sinkholes, as is expected for an area with limestone or dolomitic bedrock, and is an example of karst topography.

Because of the vertical orientation of bedding planes, meteoric water can infiltrate at a more rapid rate and provide a weaker section of rock that allowed for easier dissolution and erosion, causing Bristol Caverns to be much taller and thinner than caves found in flat strata. The vertical bedding planes also create more openings for water to infiltrate the limestone, leading to a higher-than-normal concentration of speleothems. In several areas, formations form in long lines following the bedding planes or in cross patterns following the bedding and joints.

The bedrock that Bristol Caverns formed in is the Knox Supergroup. A massive limestone and dolomite unit named for Knoxville, Tennessee, this unit is undifferentiated in the eastern quarter of Tennessee and contains the majority of caves in eastern Tennessee, such as Bristol Caverns, Worley's Cave, and Appalachian Caverns.

Bristol Caverns has several entrances: two accessible to tourists, two completely underwater (allowing animals to get in and out), and two gated, with one of the gated entrances being the original entrance to the caverns.

== Speleothems ==
There are many speleothems in Bristol Caverns:

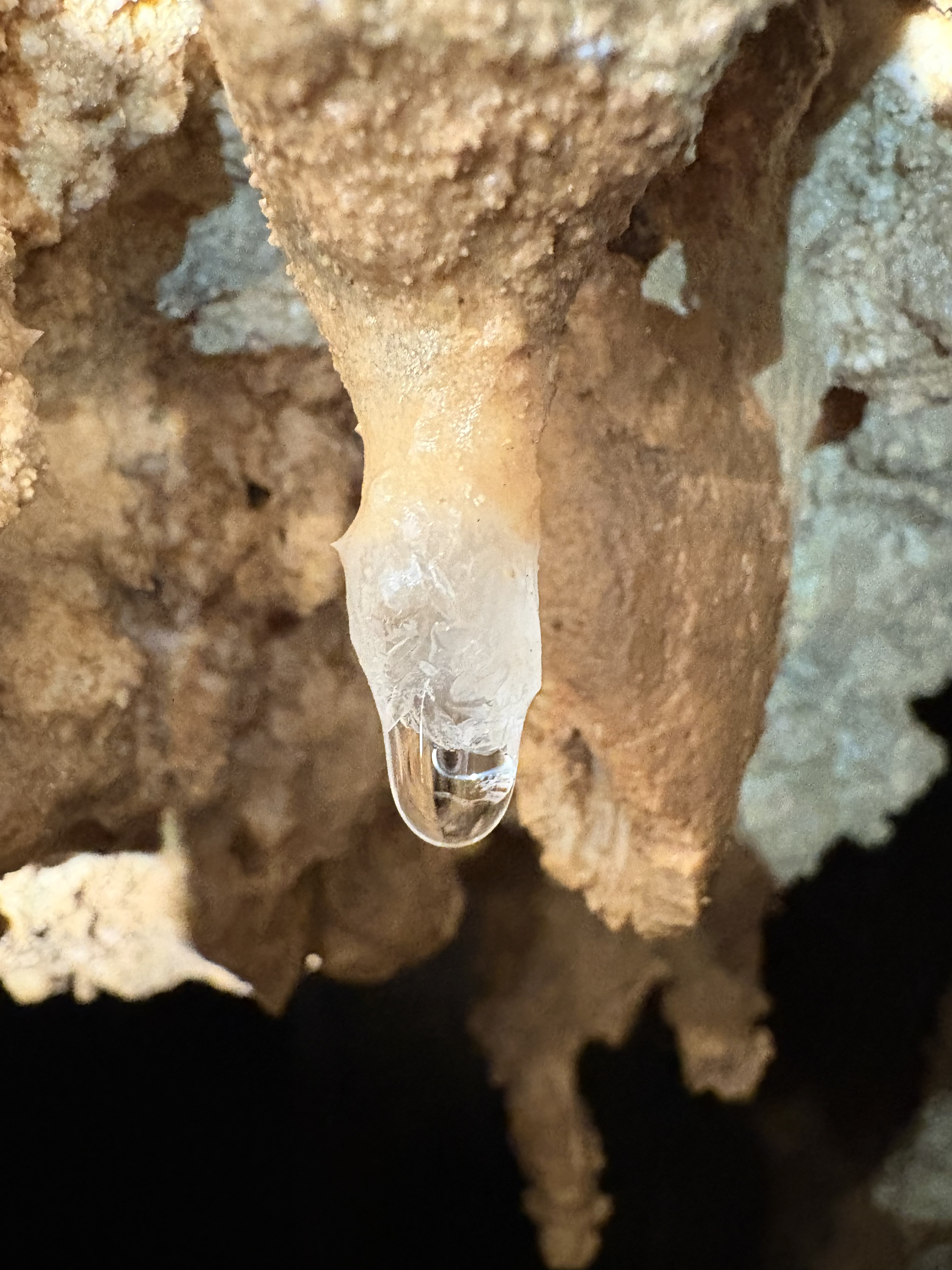
Soda Straw in Bristol Caverns

- Flowstone
  - Cave drapery
  - Rimstone
    - Dogtooth spars
    - Acicular aragonite spars
- Dripstone
  - Stalagmites
  - Stalactites
    - Soda straws
  - Conulite
- Cave coralloids
  - Cave popcorn
  - Cave coral
- Cave pearls

== Flora and fauna ==
There are many organisms in Bristol Caverns, such as tricolored bats, salamanders, fresh water skulpen, crawfish, cave crickets, possums, rats, pickerel frogs and branchiobdellida.

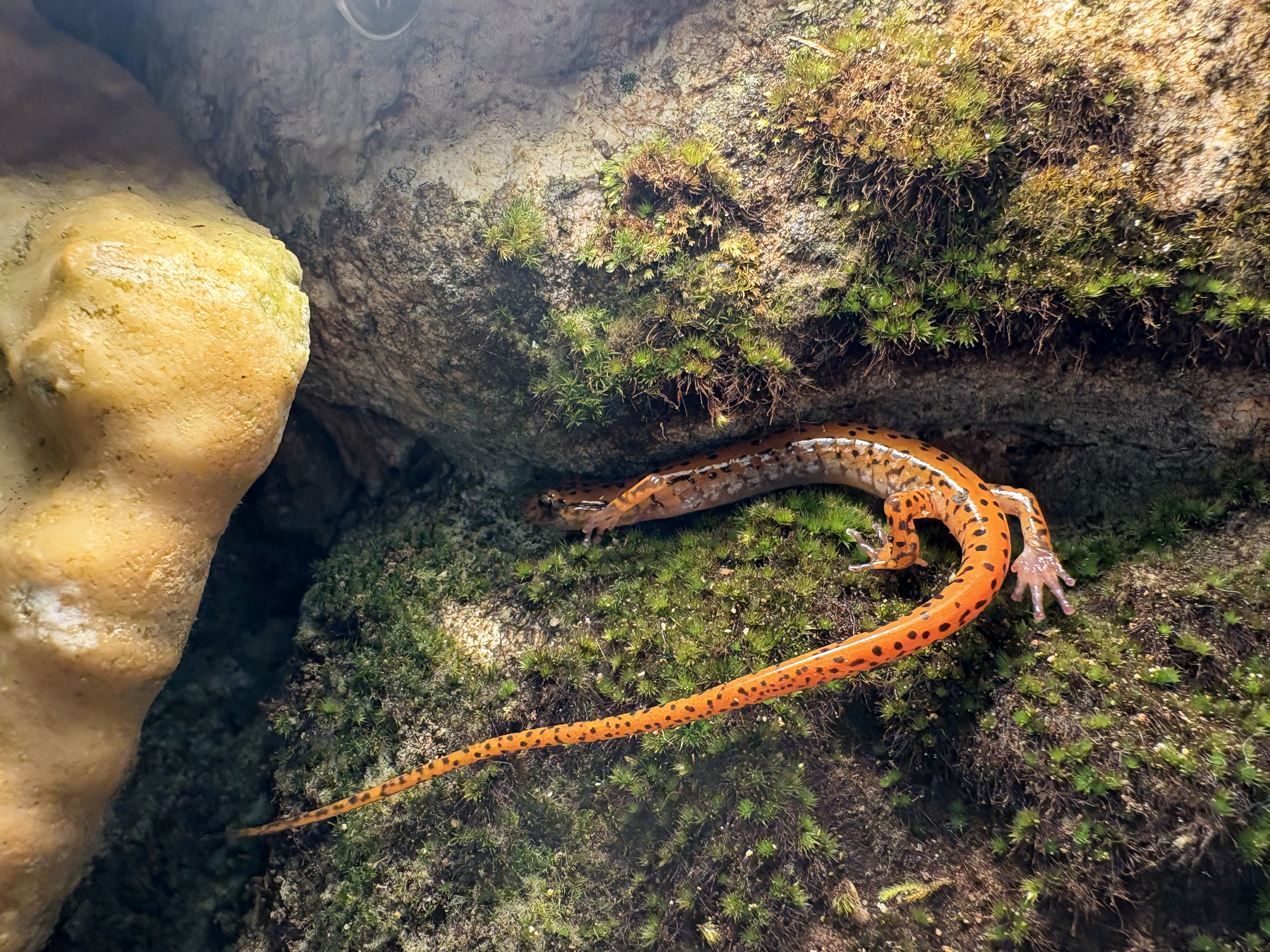
Cave salamander (spotted-tail) in Bristol Caverns

No animals found in Bristol Caverns are blind, as everything can exit the cave through the entrances created by Little Sinking Creek. Some of the animals known to have been in the cave left only traces, such as footprints or bones.

Due to the artificial lighting used for visitors, there are several plants and fungi in Bristol Caverns. The majority of these non naturally occurring growths are mosses and blue mold, though there are some shield ferns and grasses attempting to grow near the lights. There are also many colonies of the actinomycetes bacteria growing on the walls and ceilings. These bacteria do not need artificial lighting and can be found throughout the cave.

- Species of salamander in Bristol Caverns:
  - Cave salamander (spotted-tail)
  - Northern Slimy Salamander
  - Red Salamander
  - Southern two-lined salamander
  - Spring Salamander

== Gallery ==
=== Formations ===
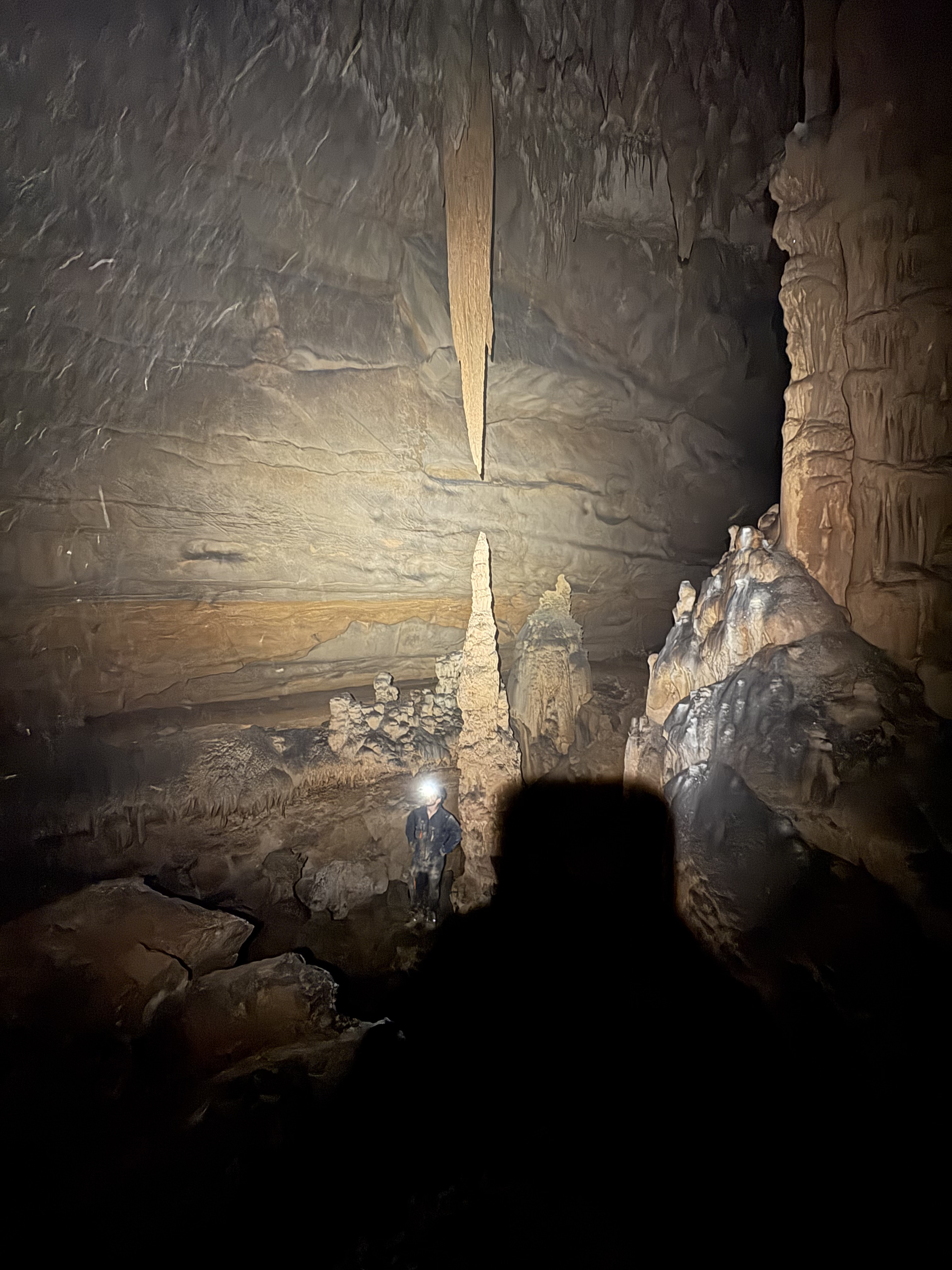
Large dripstone with caver for scale

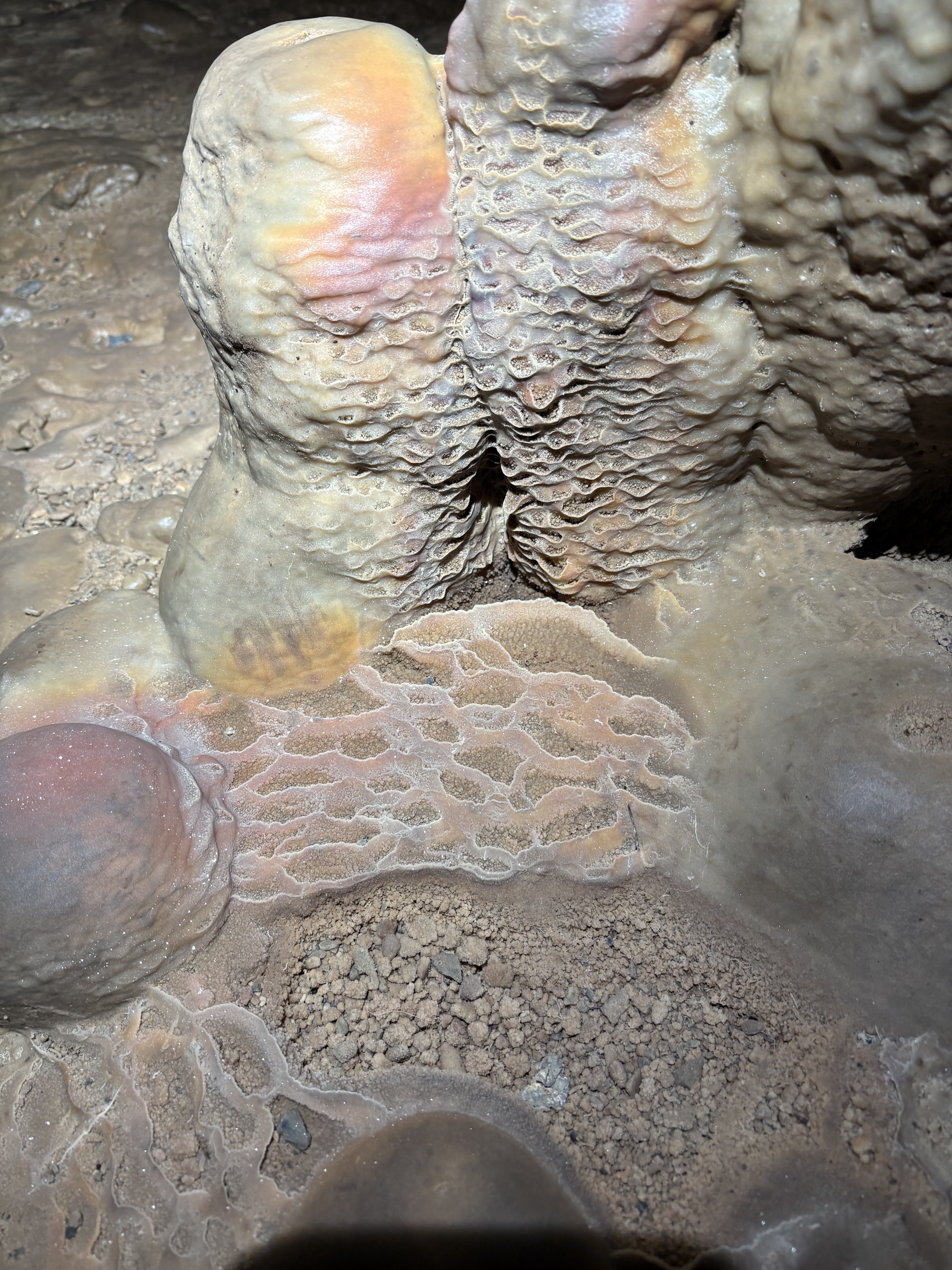
A rimstone with odd color

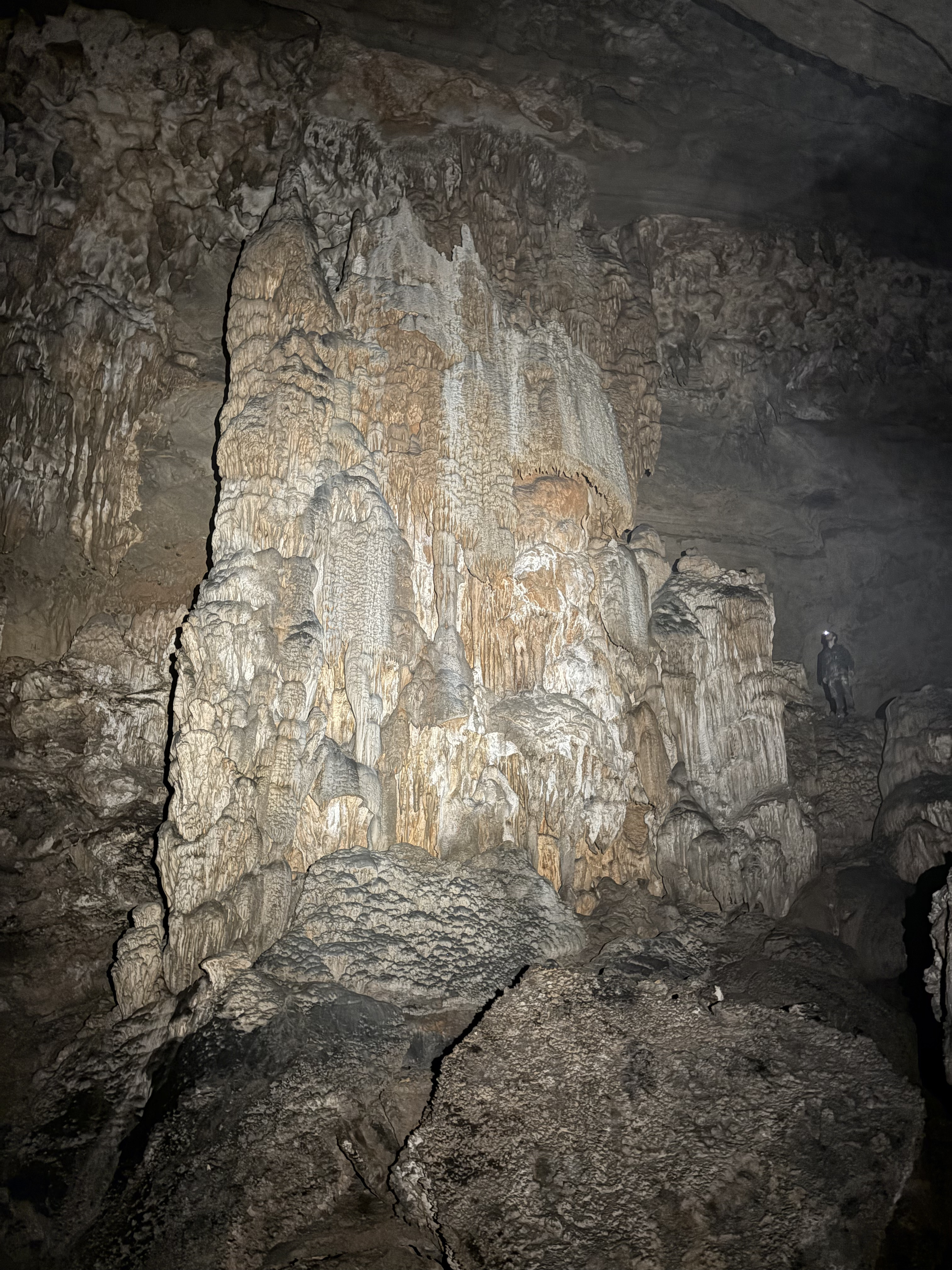
Cave column "Gigantis" with caver for scale

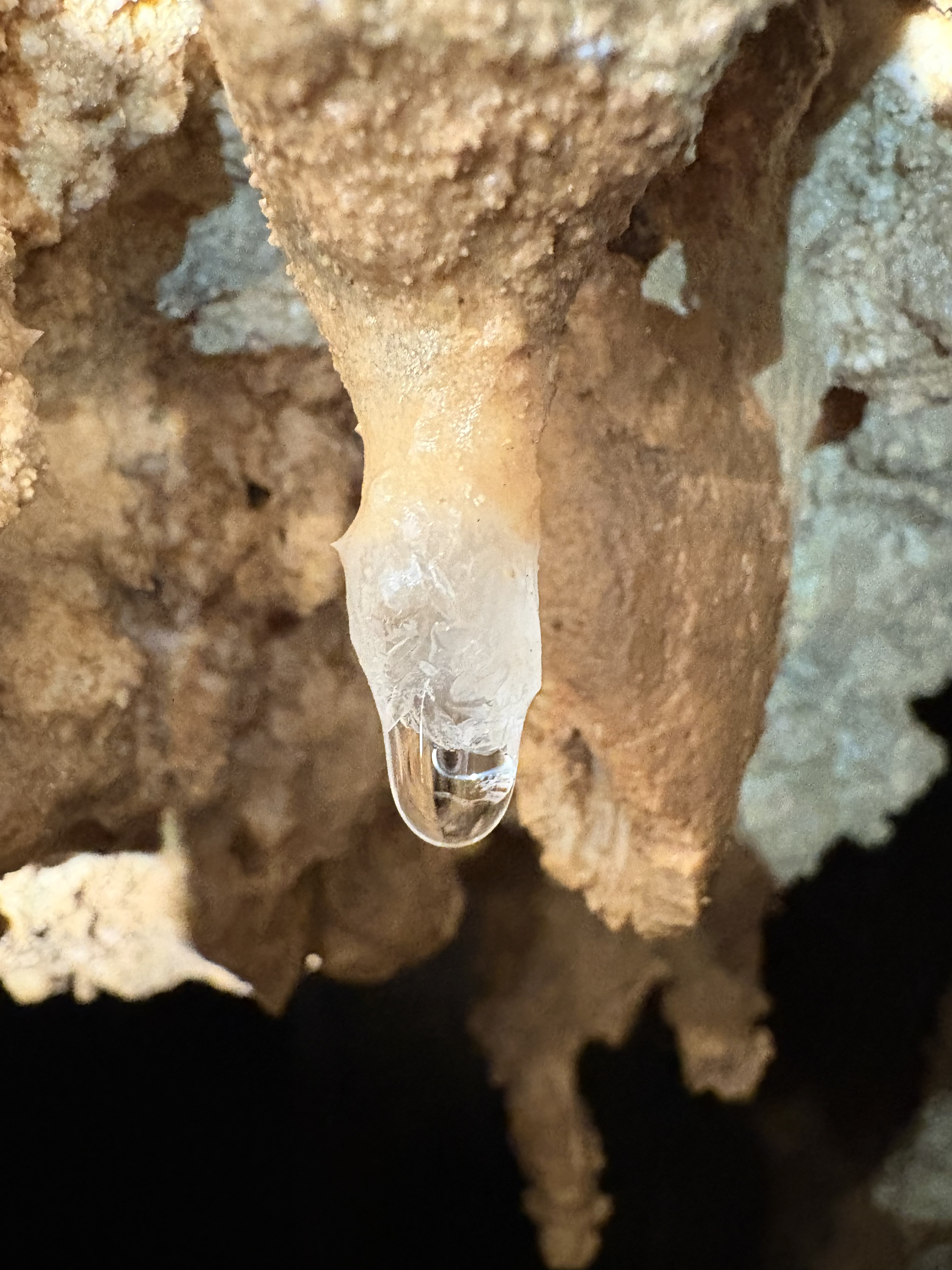
A close up of a soda straw stalactite

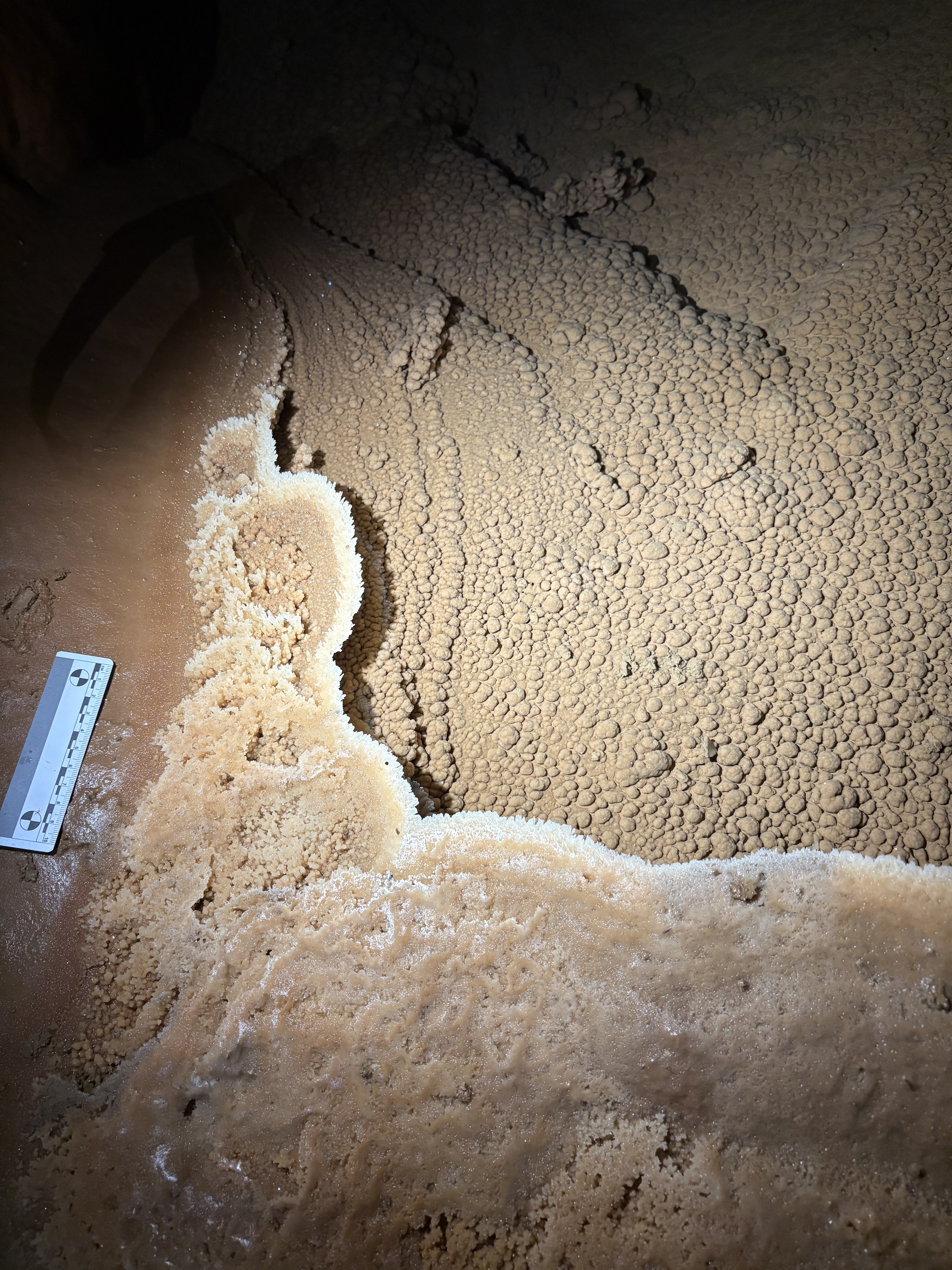
Rimstone pool with subaqueous coralloids and aragonite

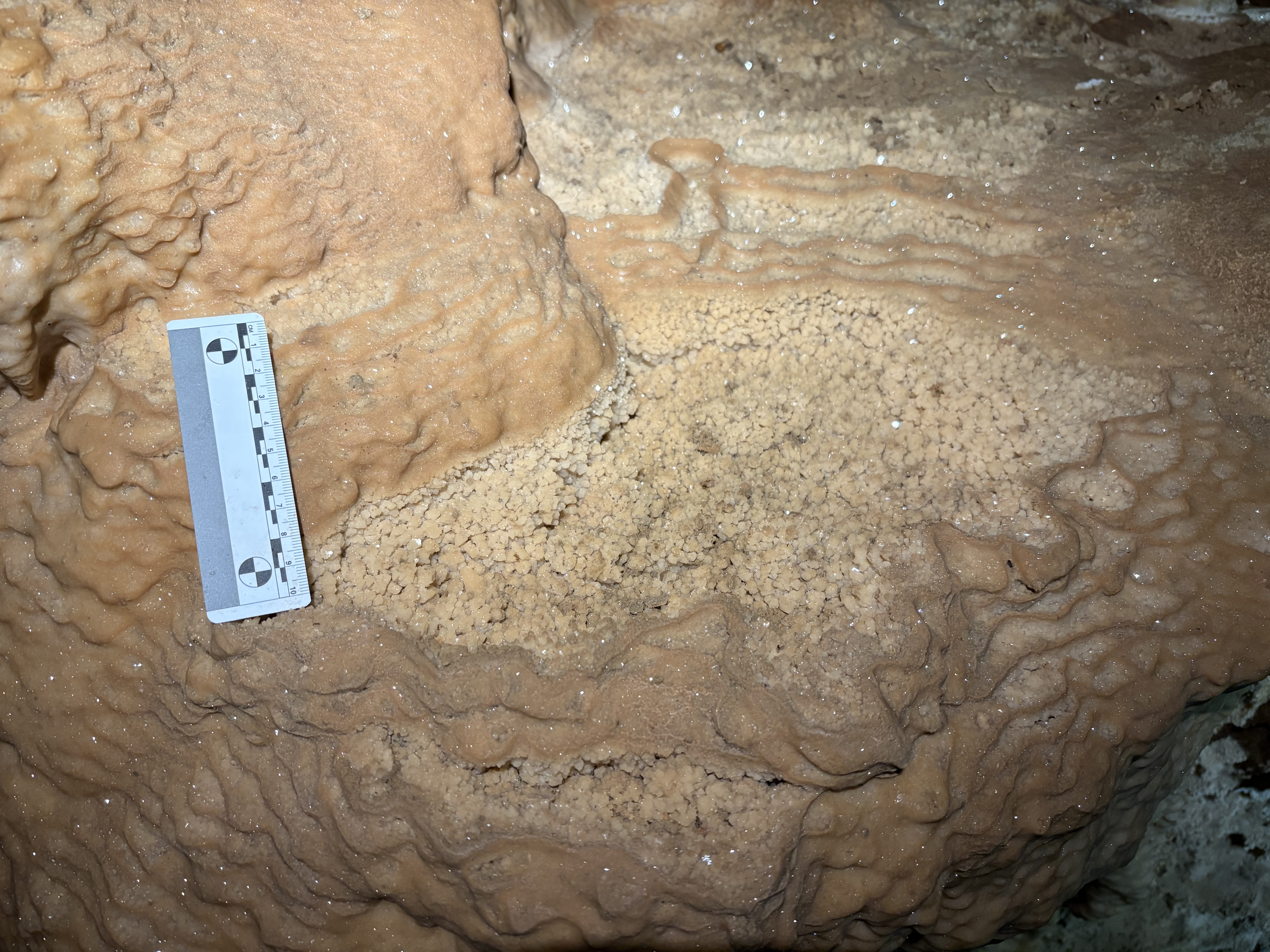
Pool spar with 10cm scale

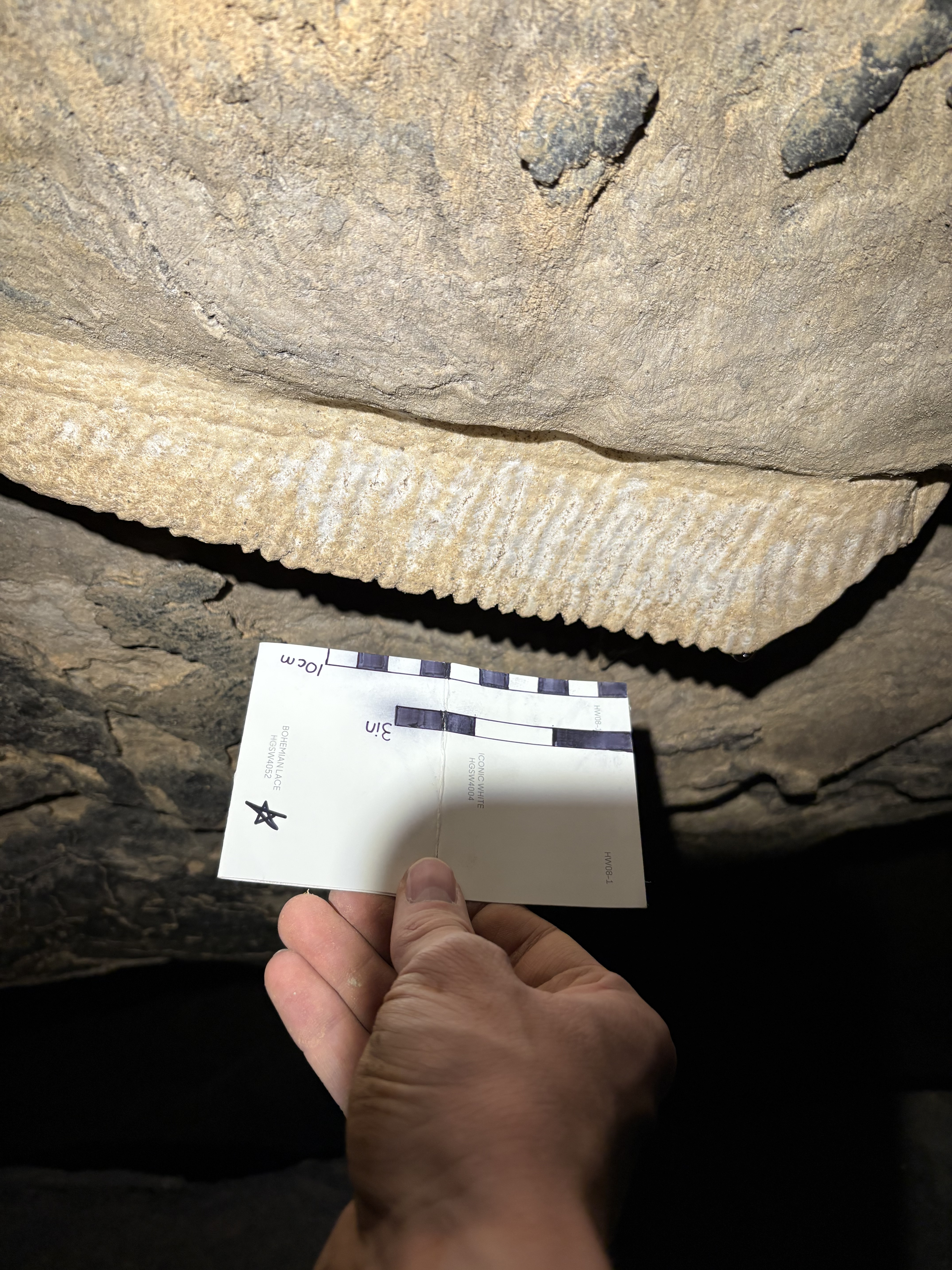
Cave Bacon with sawtooth pattern (10cm scale)

=== Fauna ===
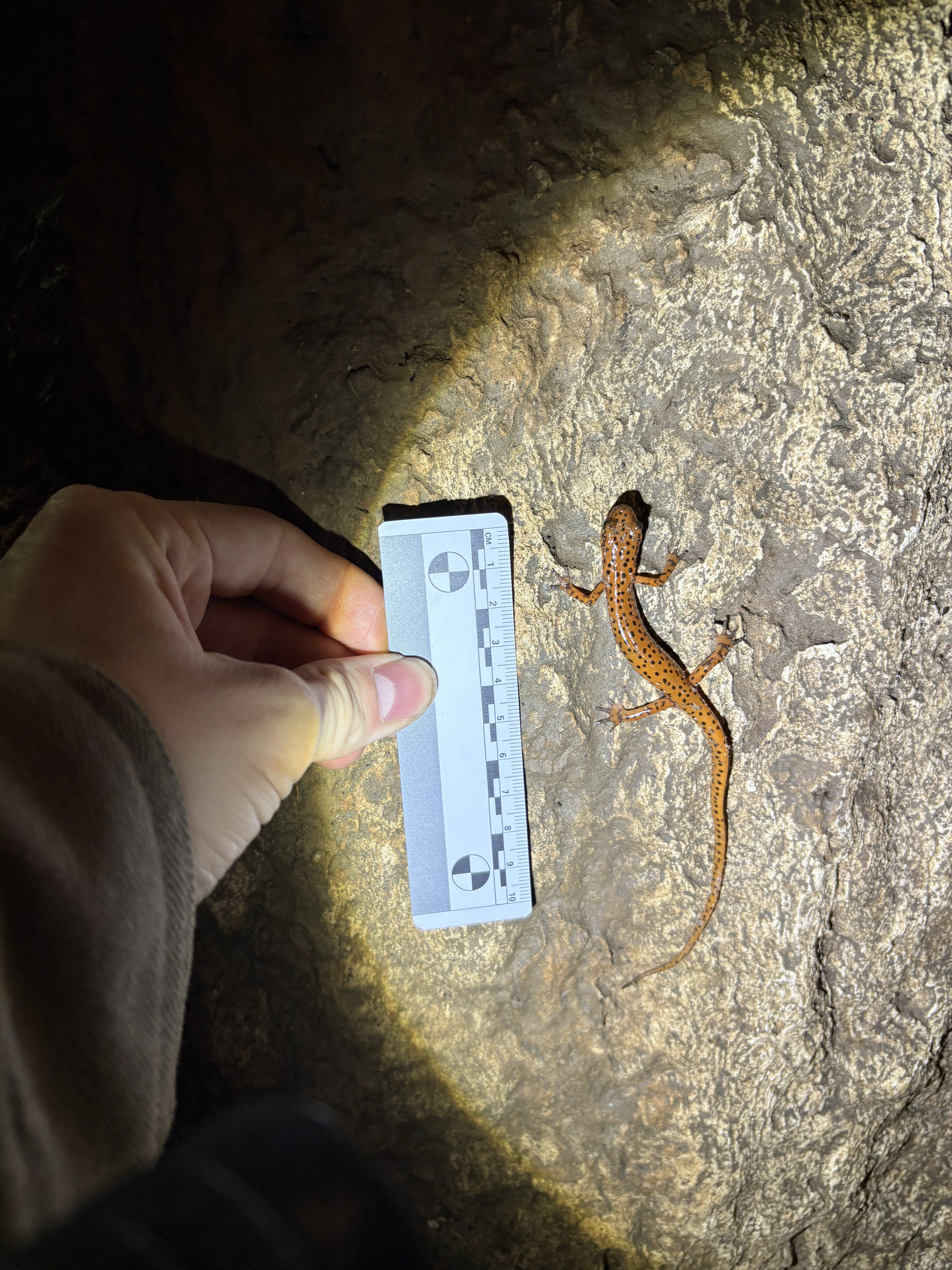
Cave salamander with 10cm scale

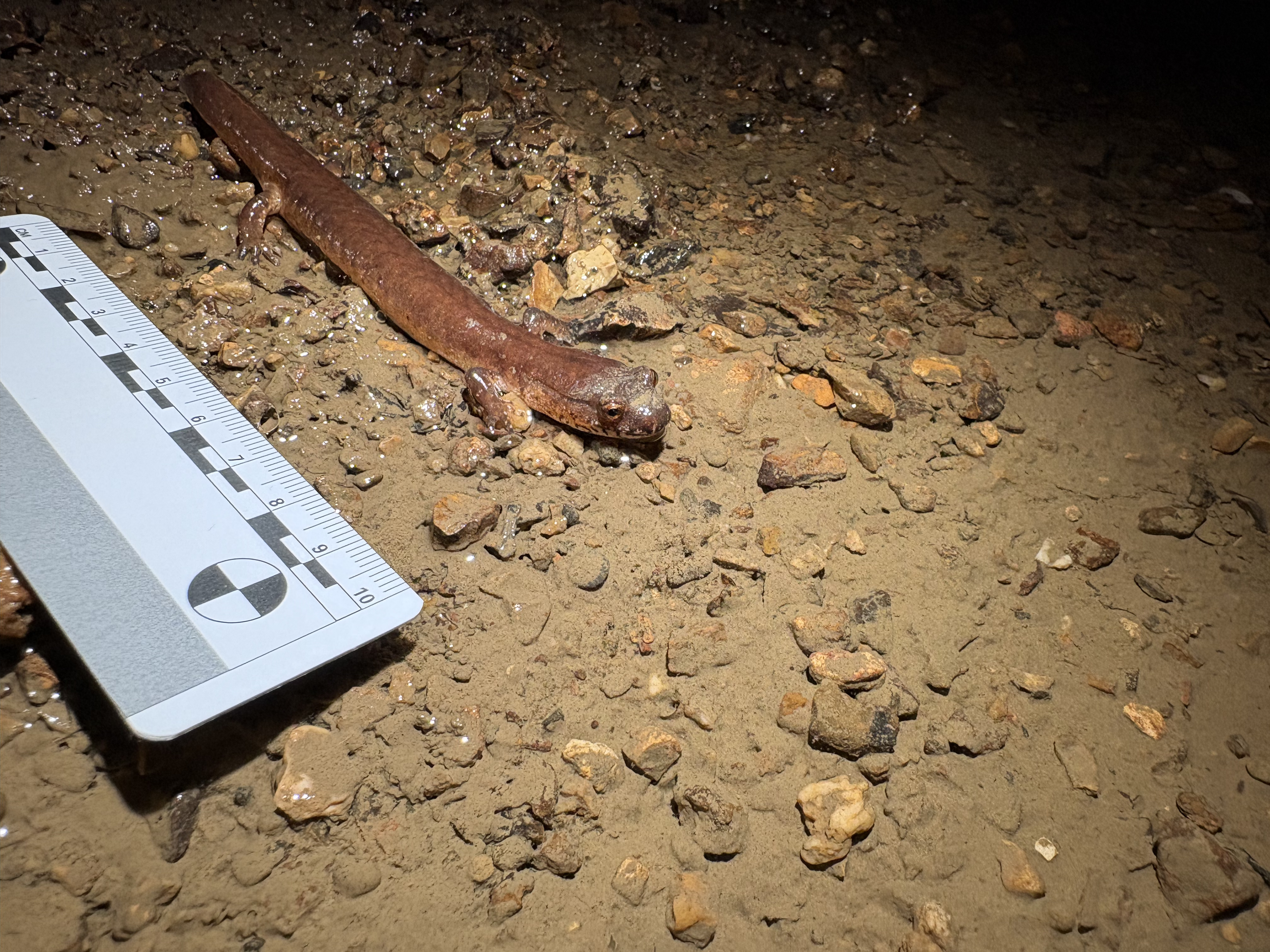
Spring salamander with 10cm scale

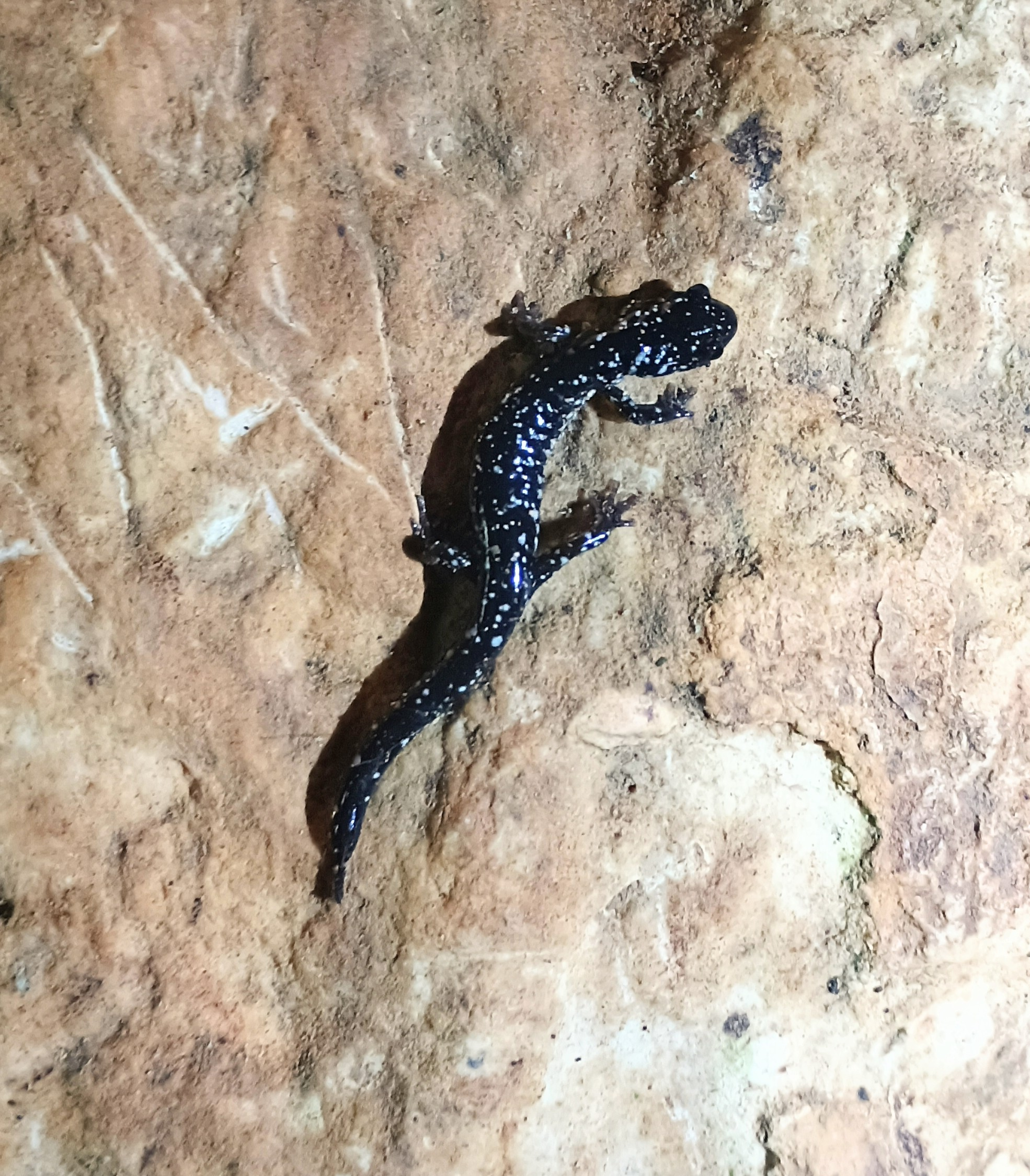
Northern slimy salamander

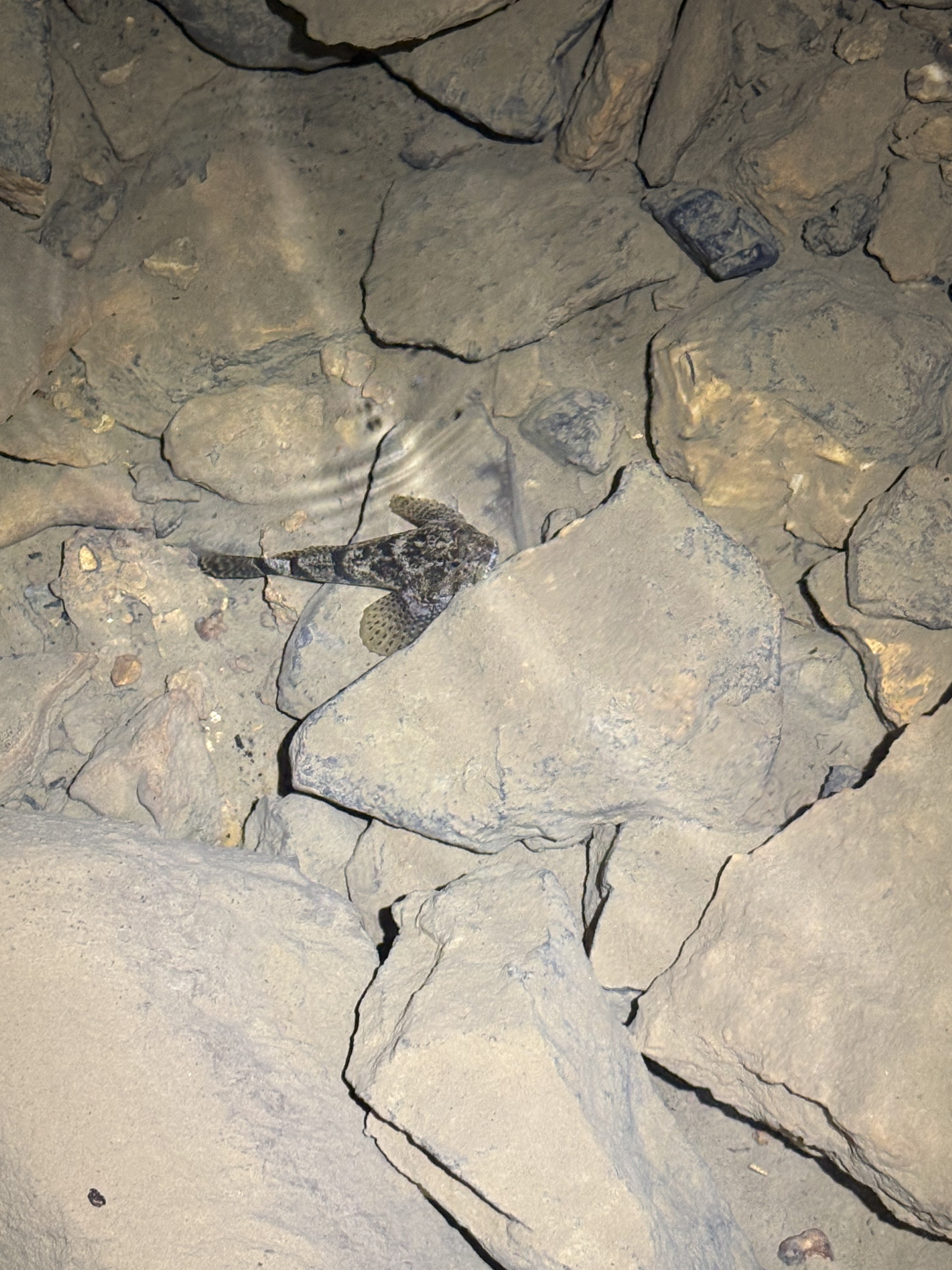
Sculpen

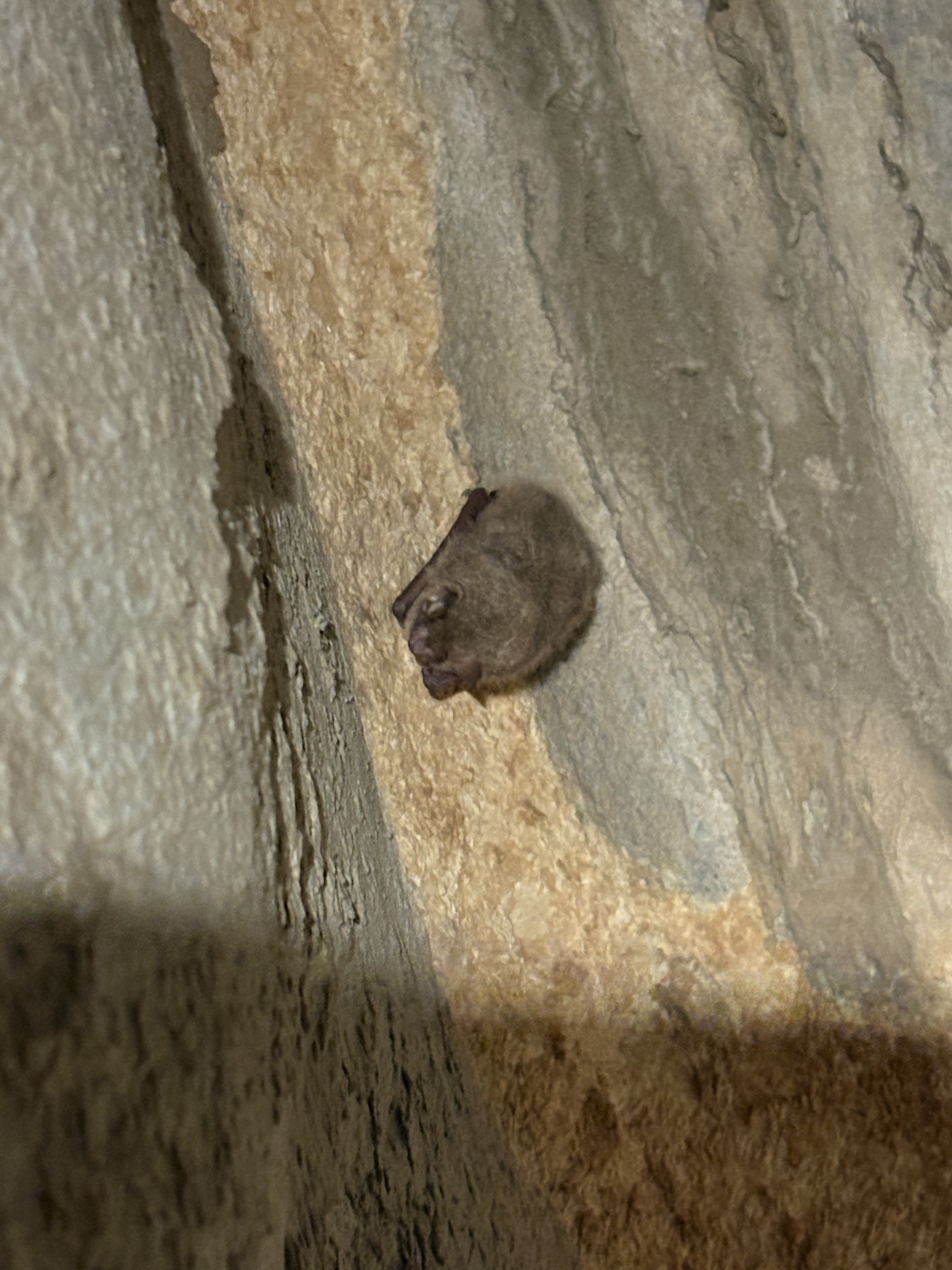
Tricolor bat in cave

=== Bones ===
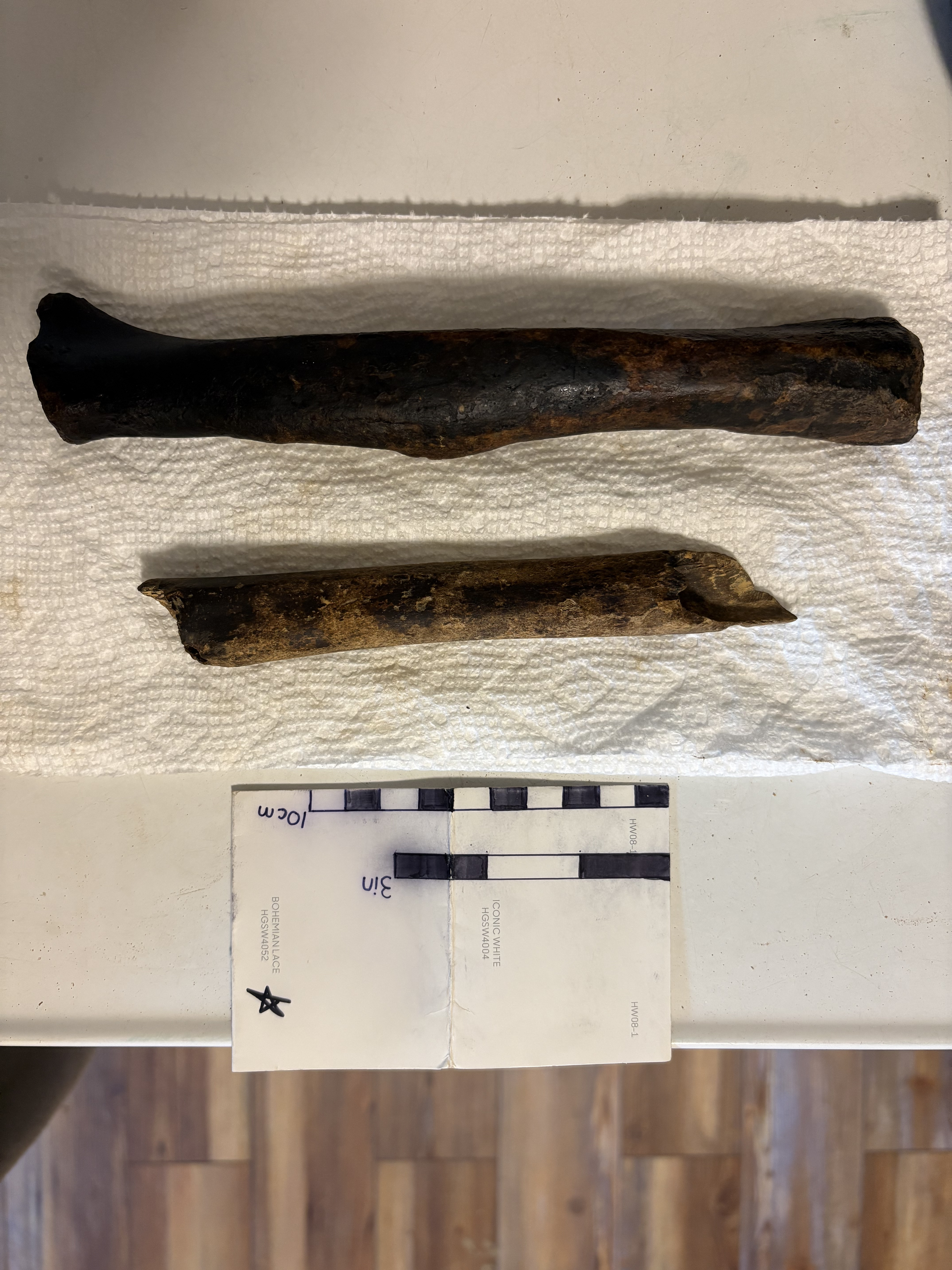
Deer bones (likely fib-tib) with makeshift 10cm scale

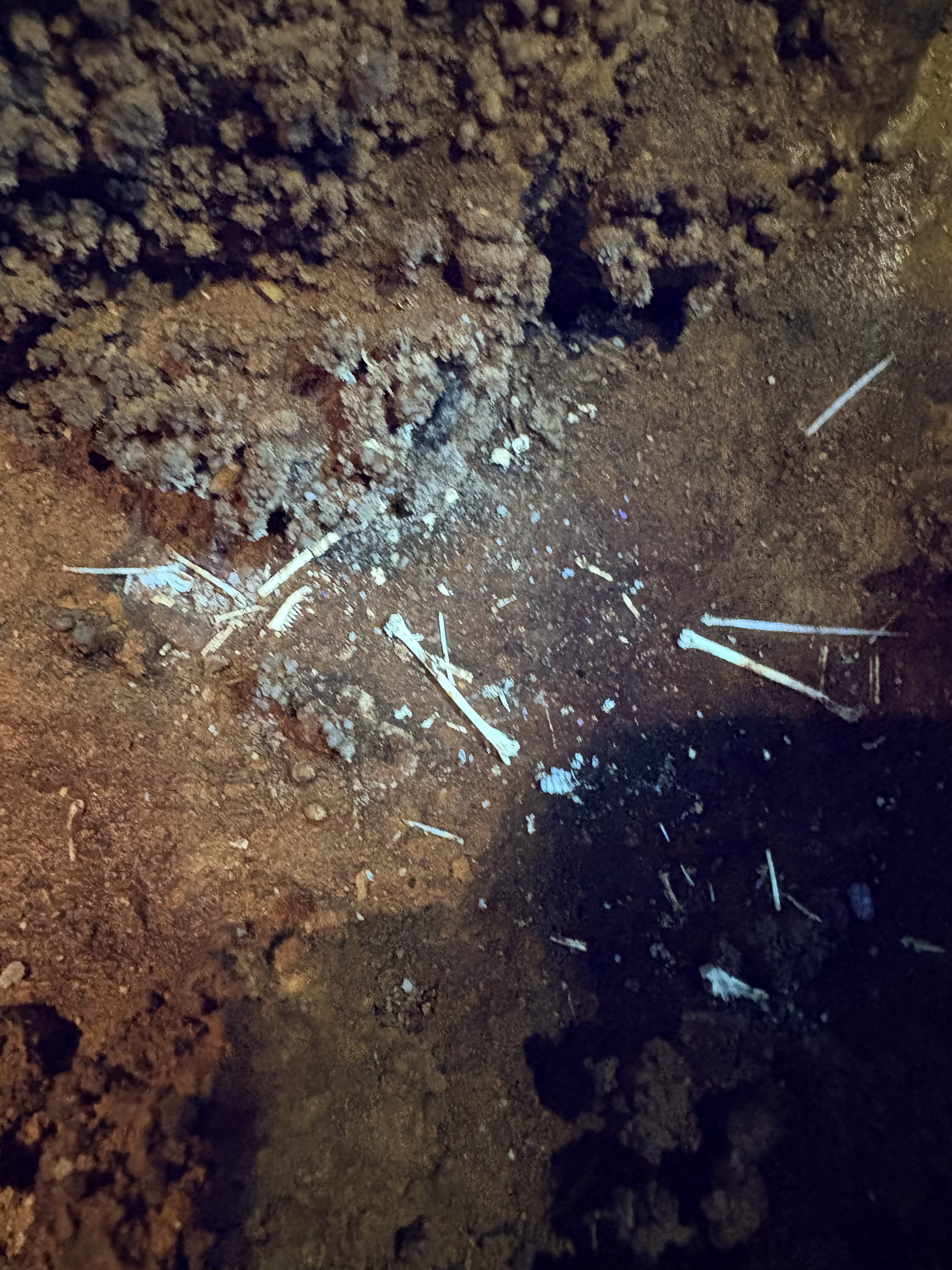
Bat bones under 365nm UV

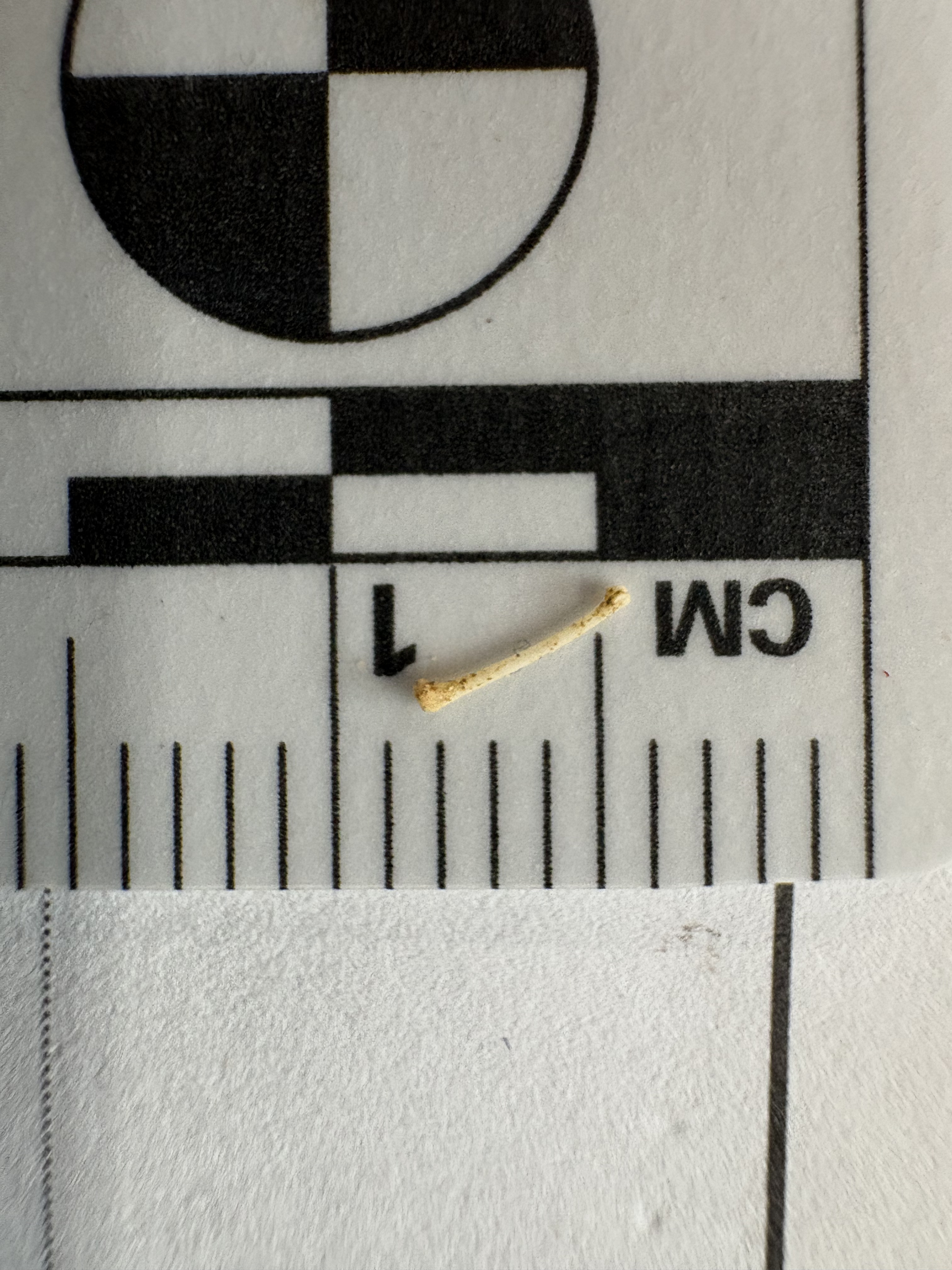
Finger bone of a bat (likely distal finger) with a 1cm scale

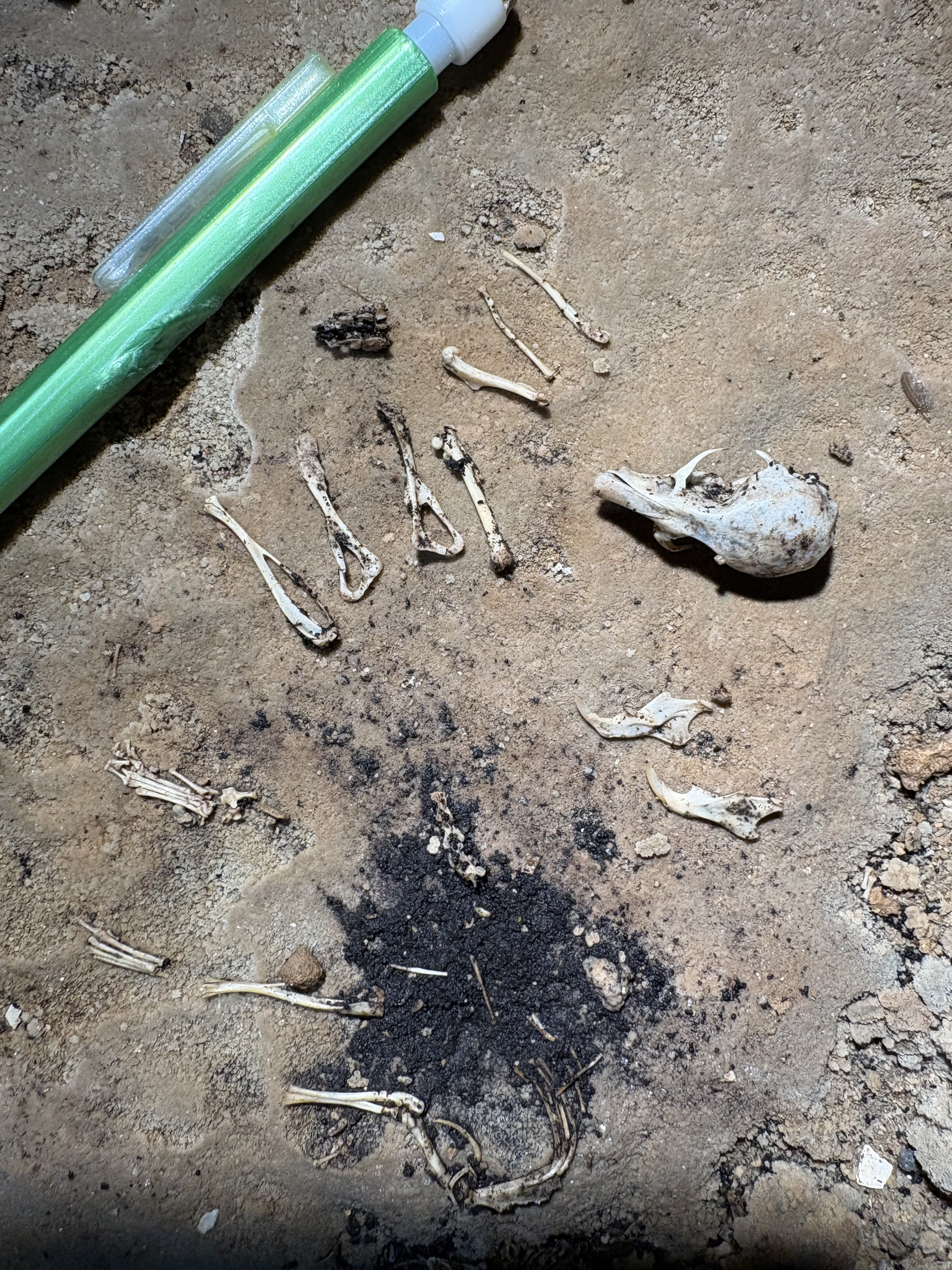
Mouse bones in Bristol Caverns, pencil for scale

=== Historic documents ===
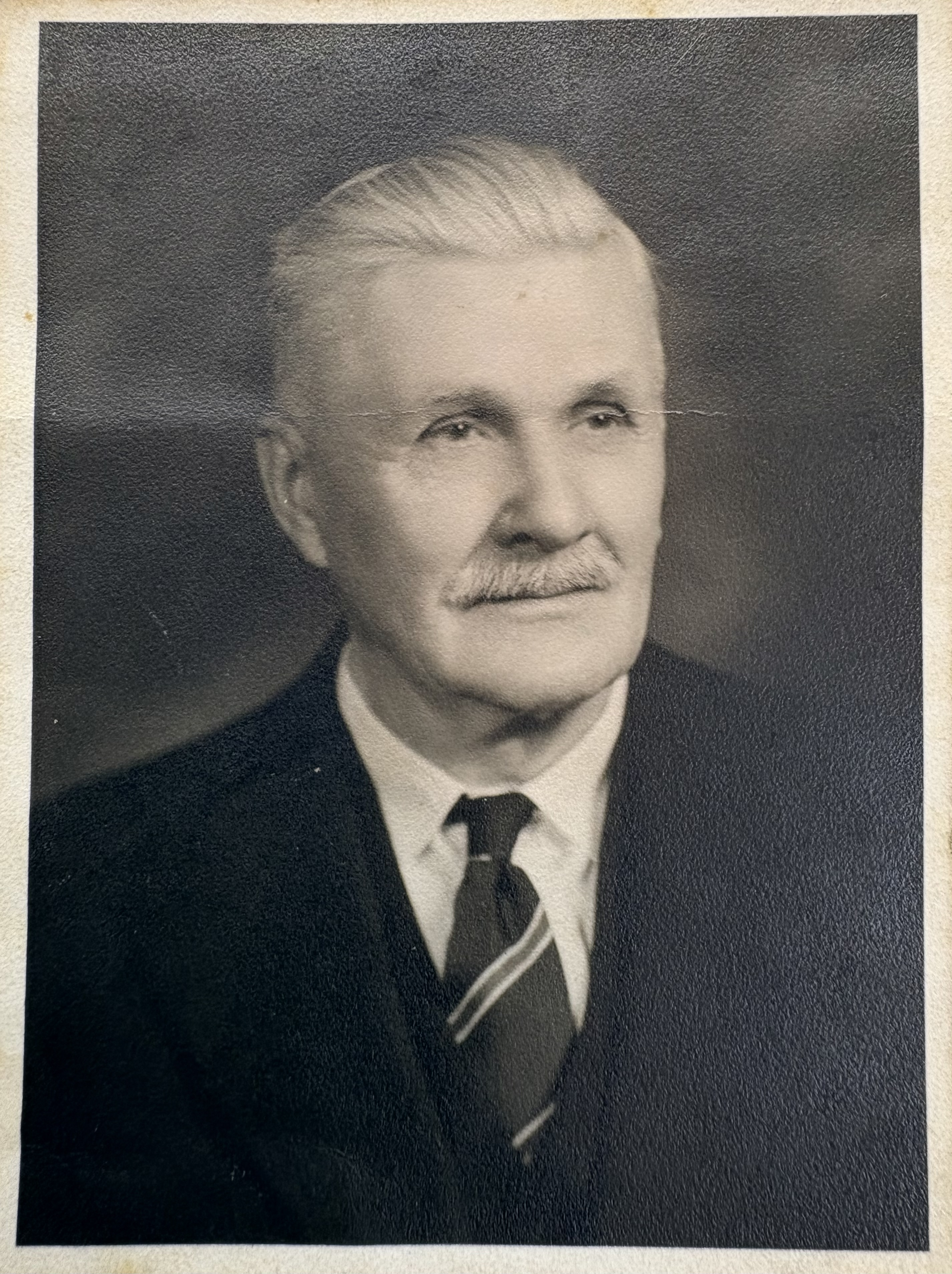
1941 photo of Samuel Sesler, Jr.

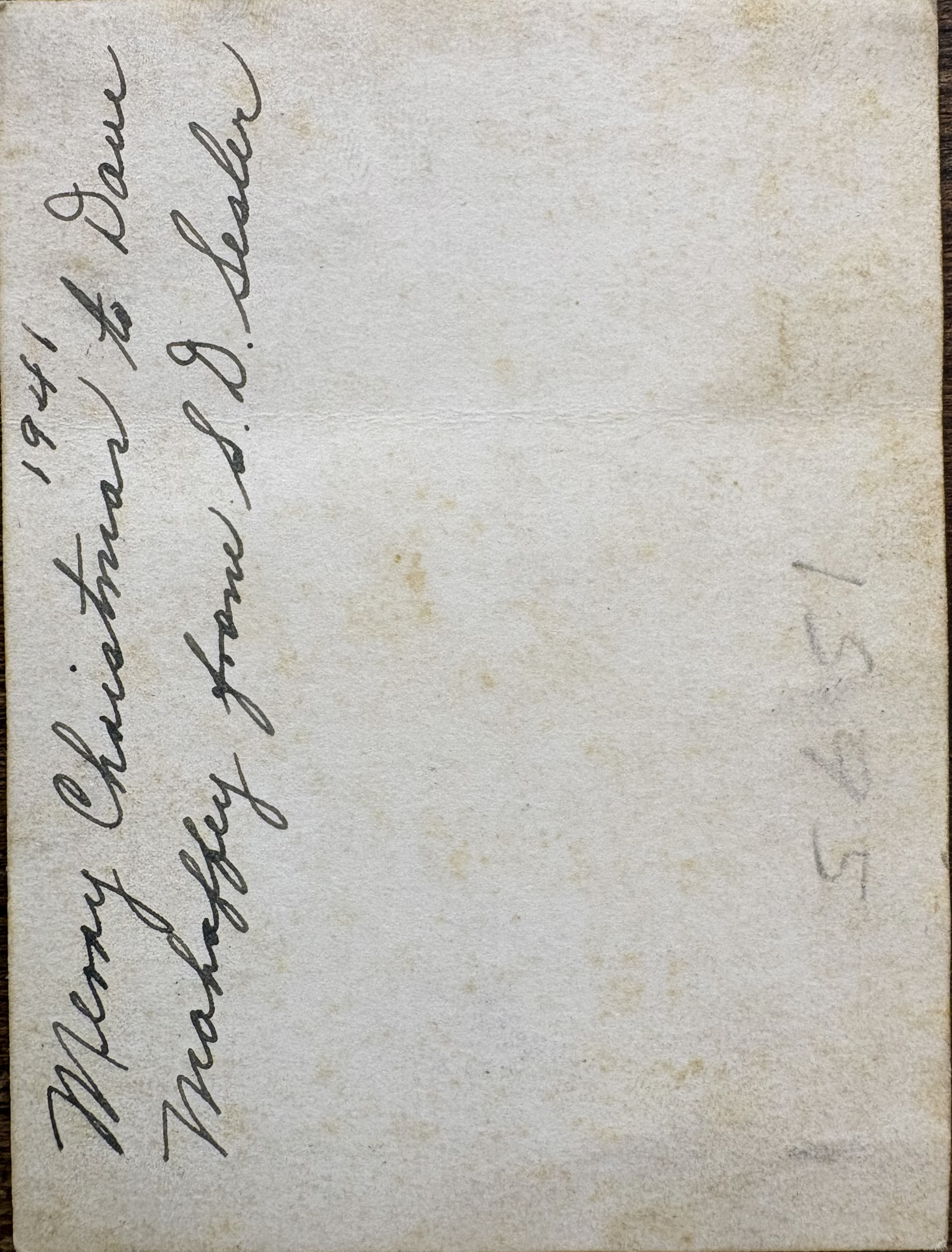
Samuel Sesler, Jr. back side

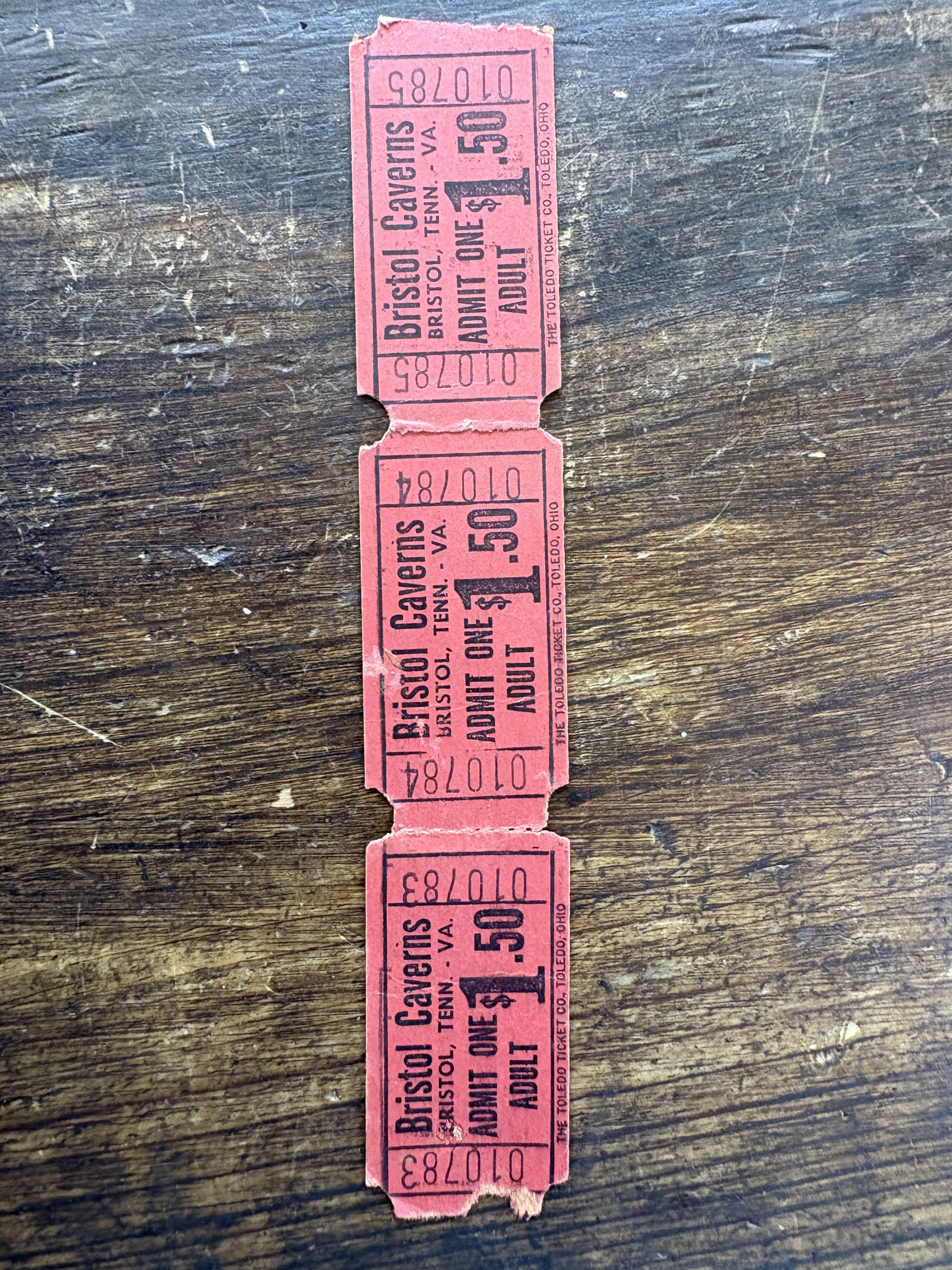
Old Bristol Caverns Admission tickets

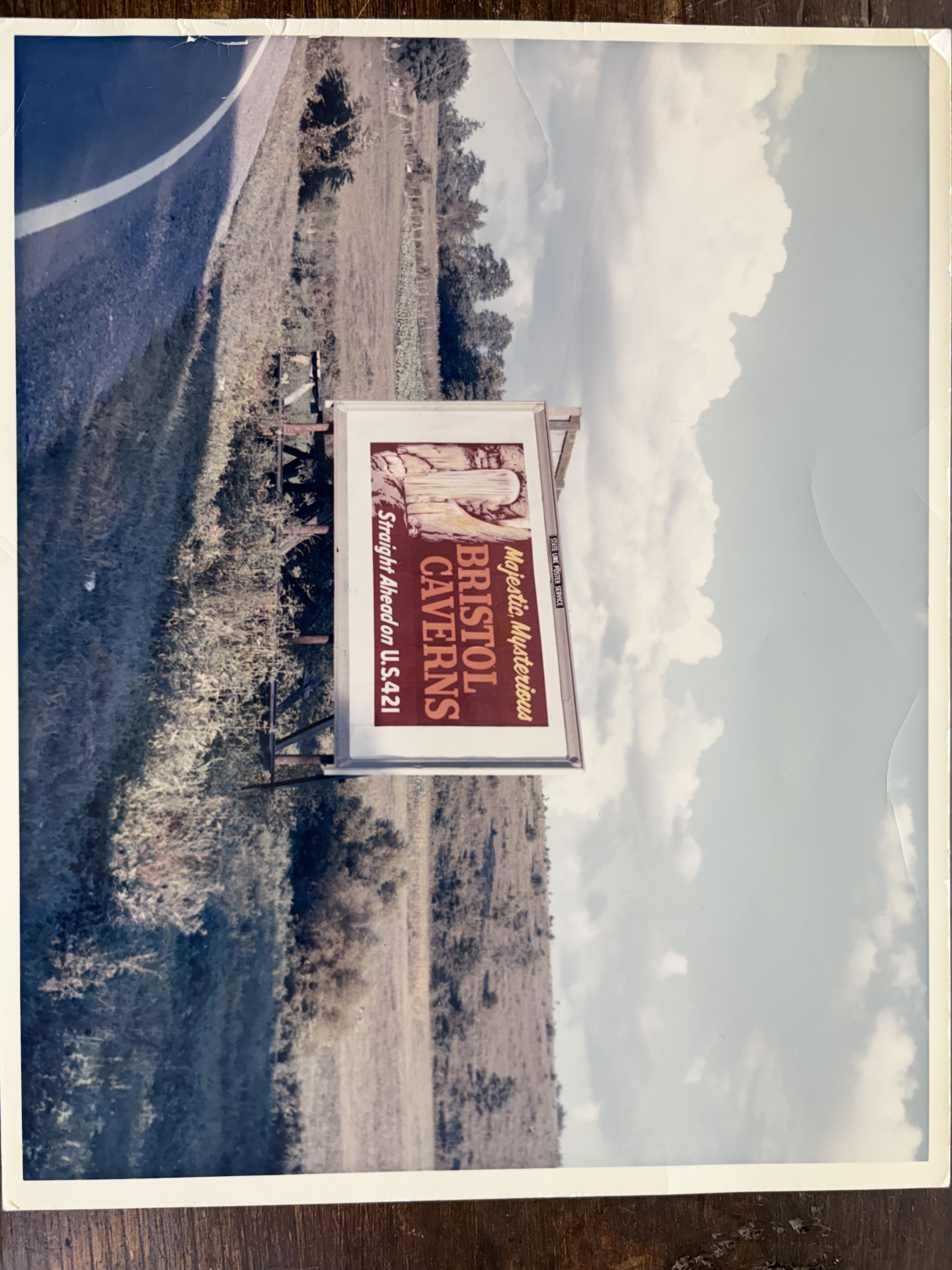
Old Bristol Caverns Billboard on Hwy 412

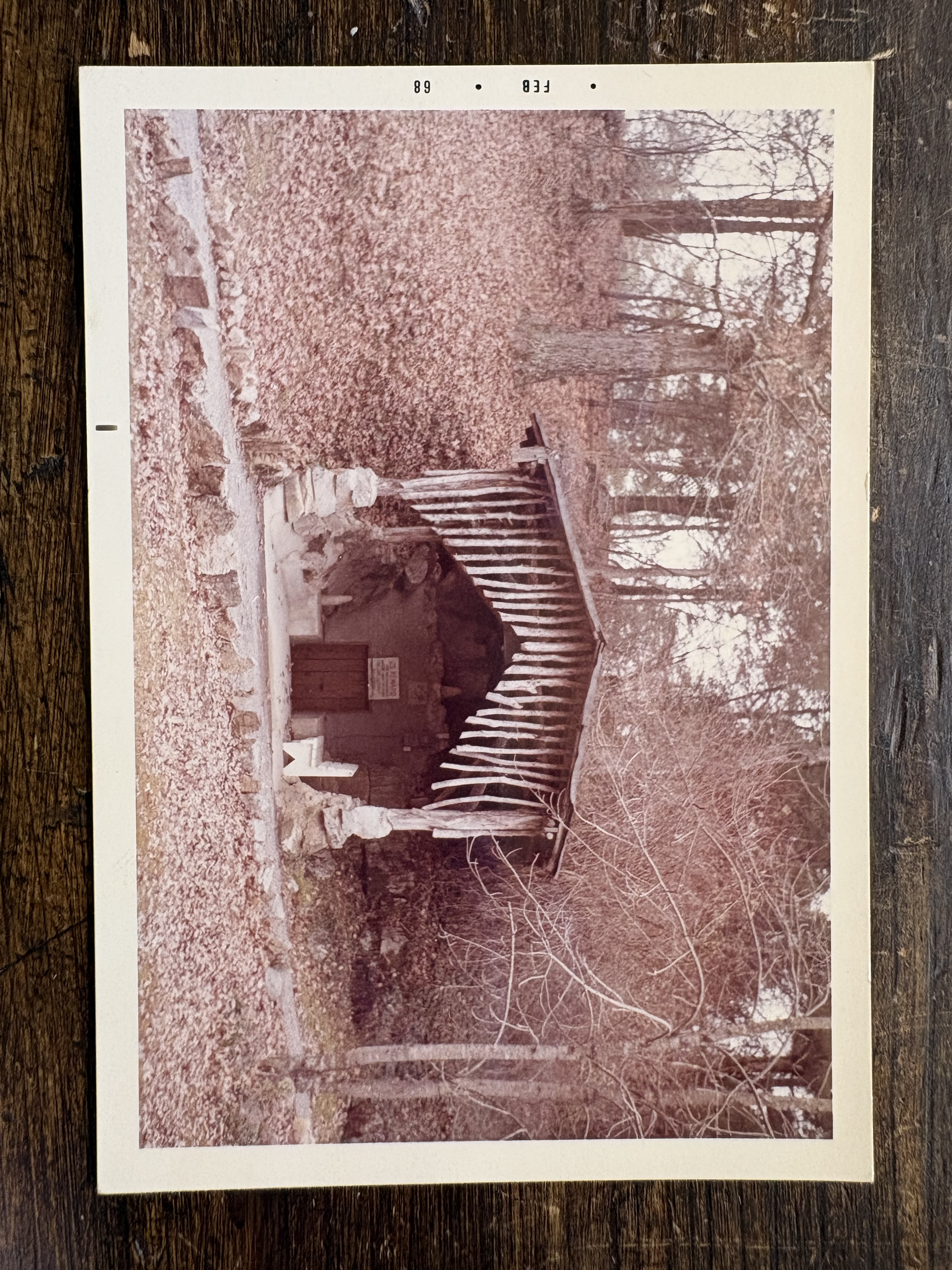
1968 photo of the tour entrance to Bristol Caverns

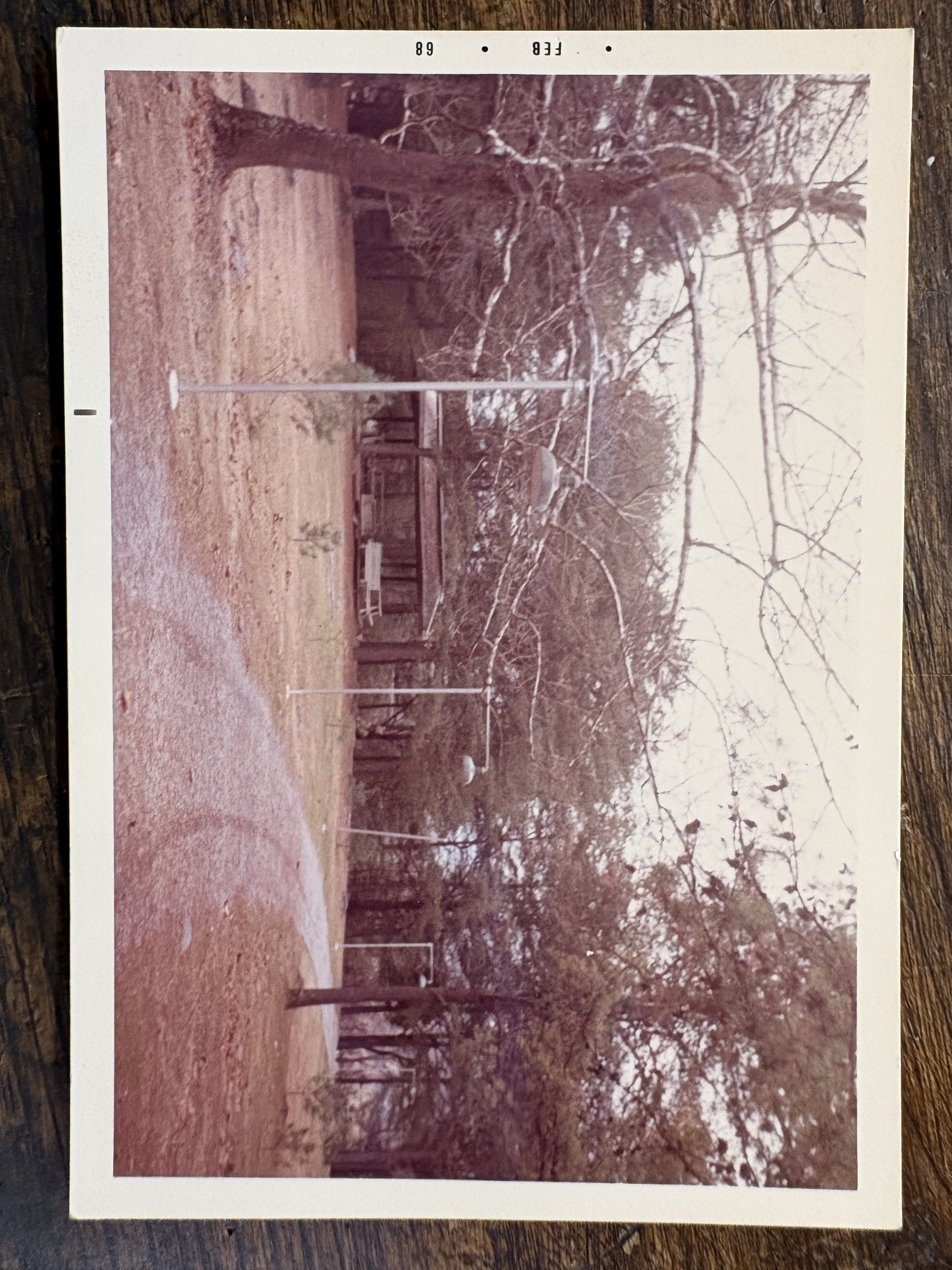
1968 photo of pathway from gift shop to cave entrance

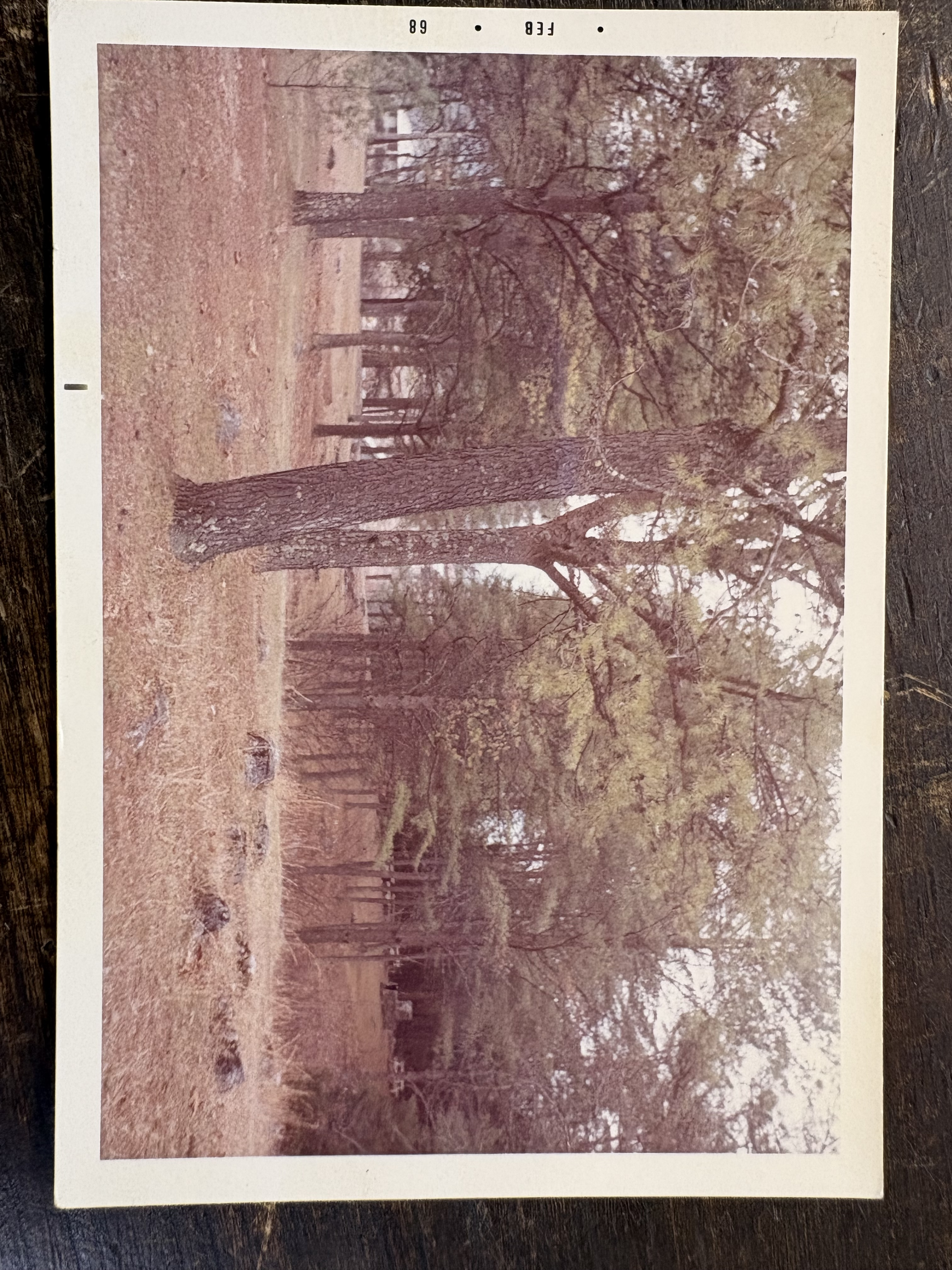
1968 photo of the sinkhole connected to Bristol Caverns

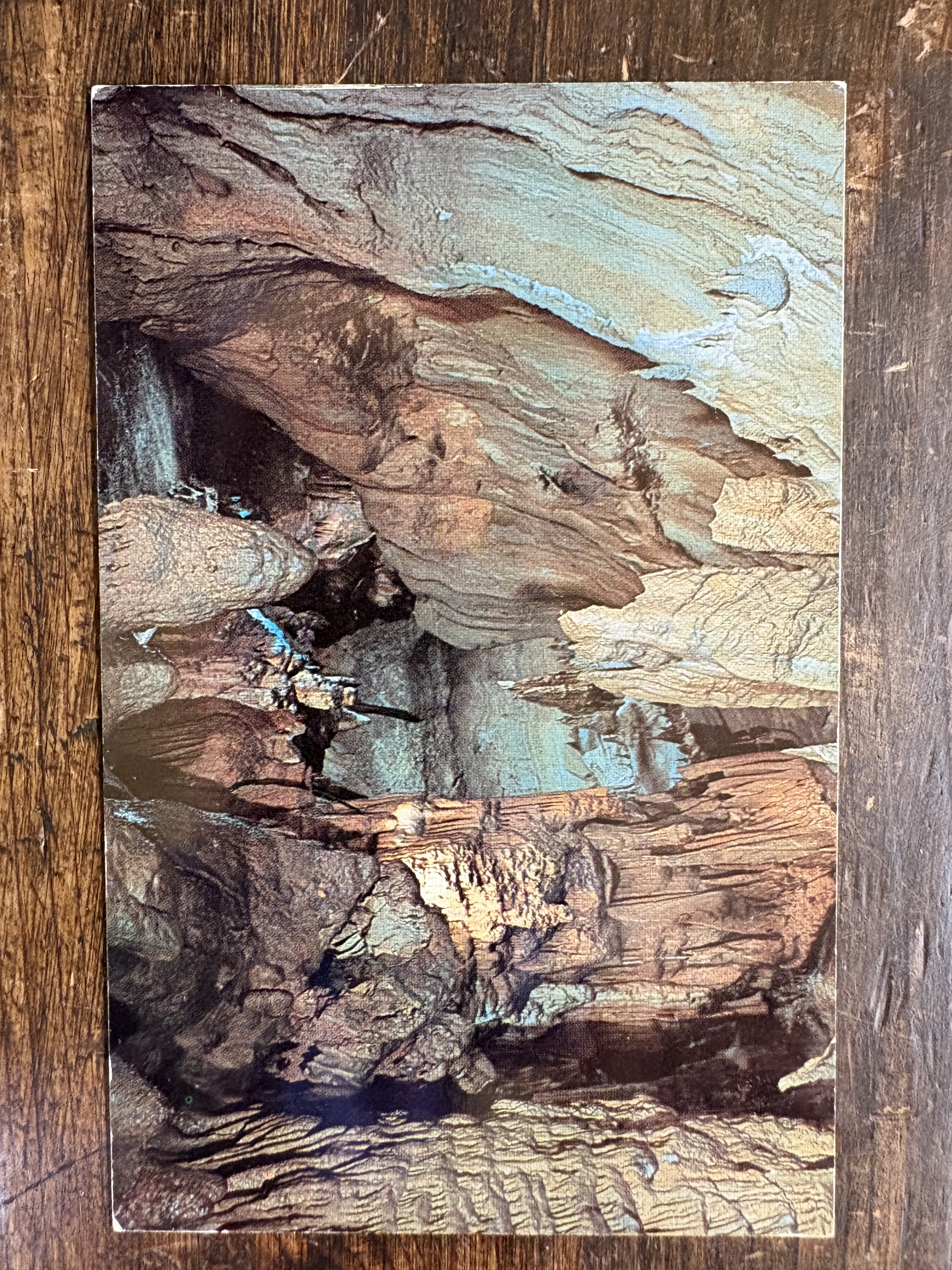
The Wishing Stone

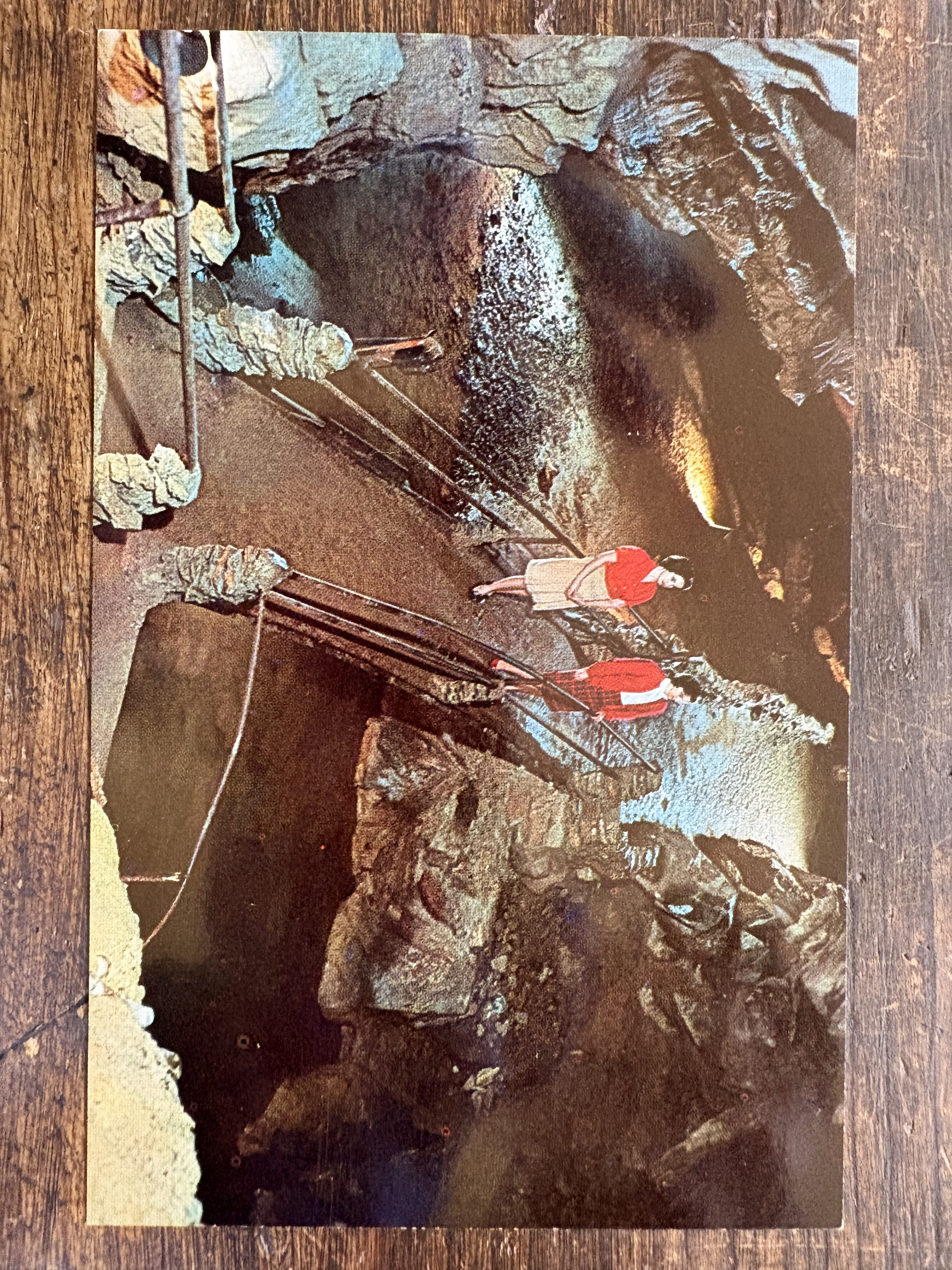
Bristol Caverns Bridge

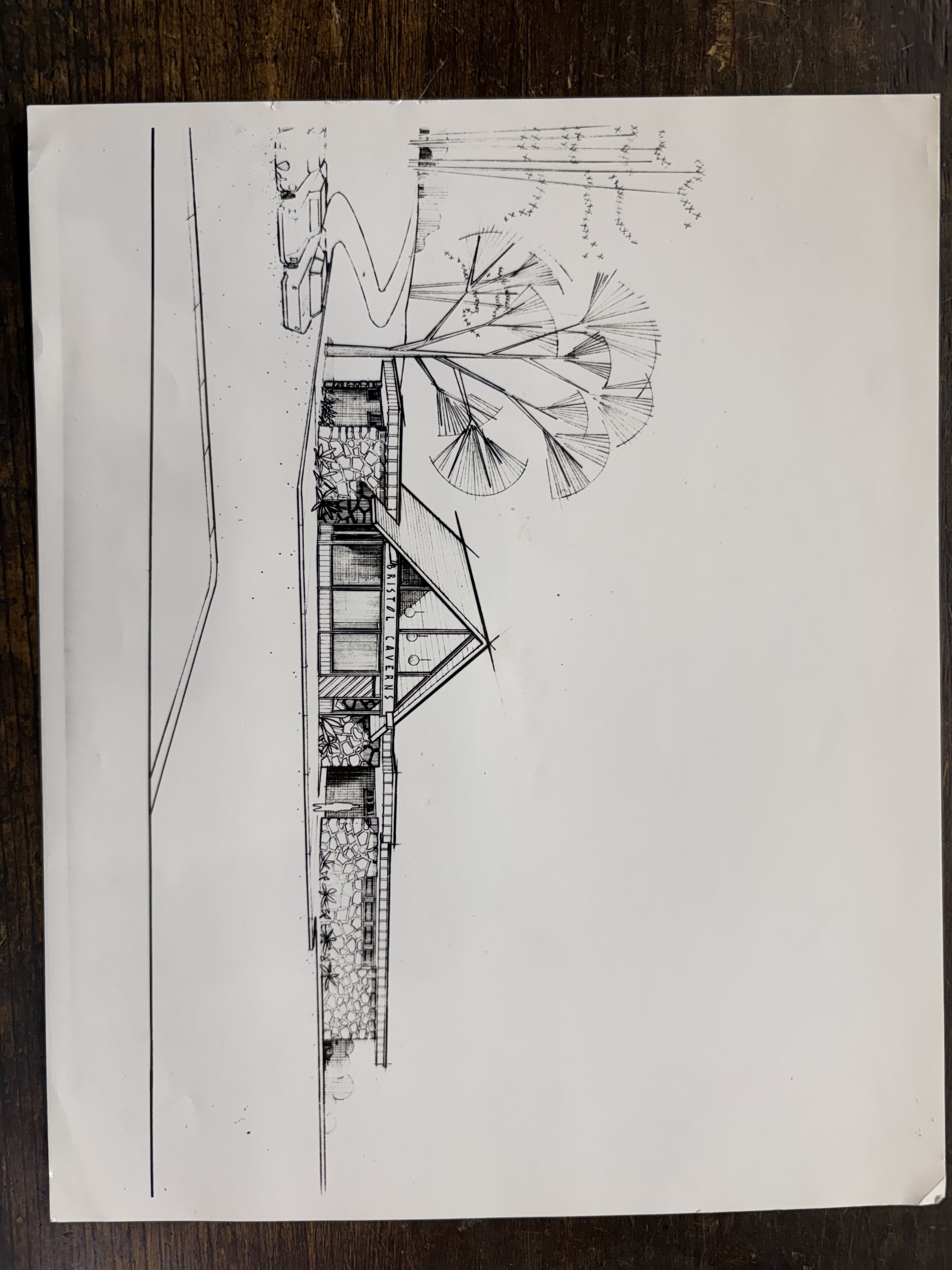
1963 drawing of the Bristol Caverns gift shop

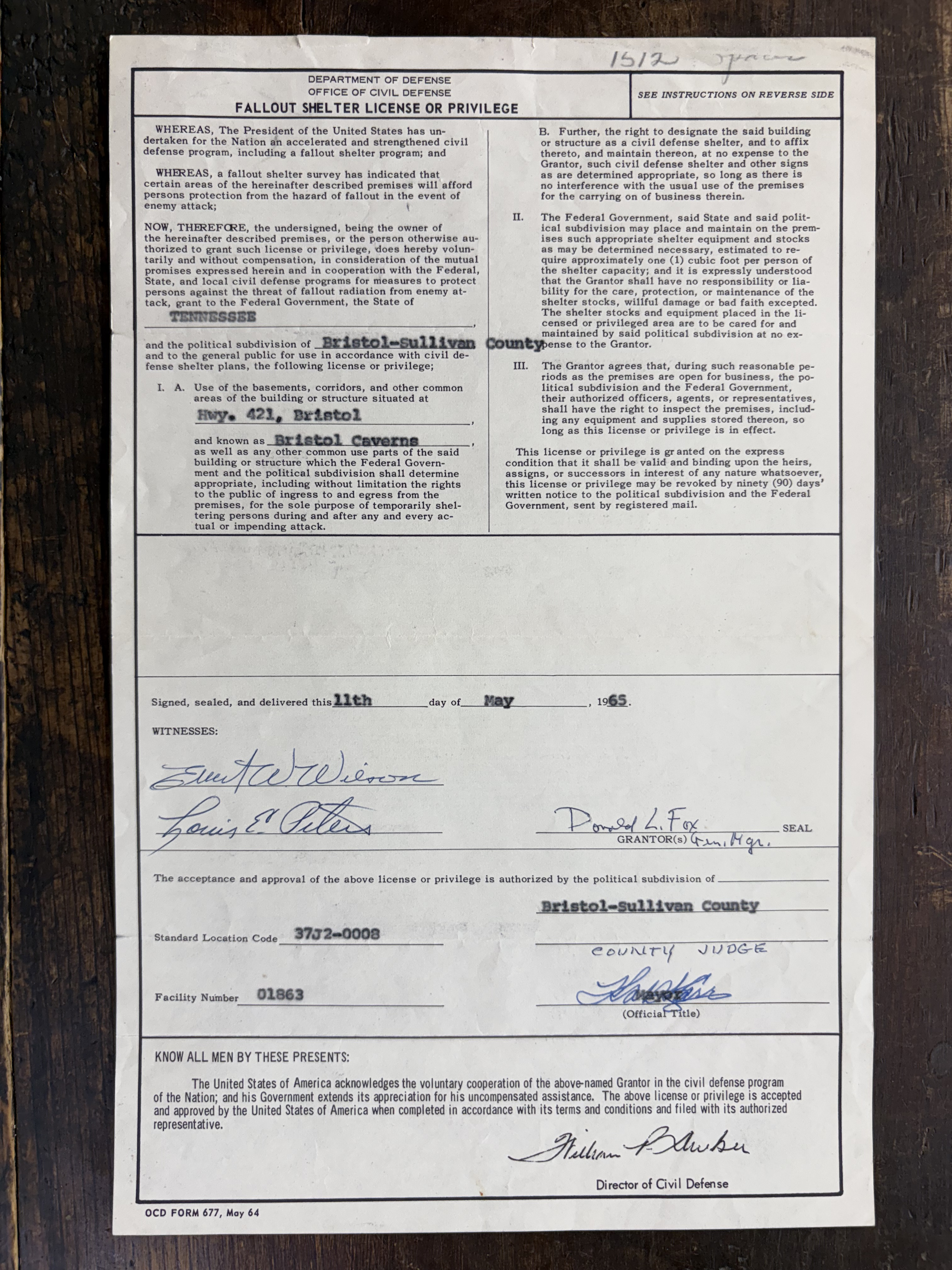
Fallout shelter license or privileges of Bristol Caverns

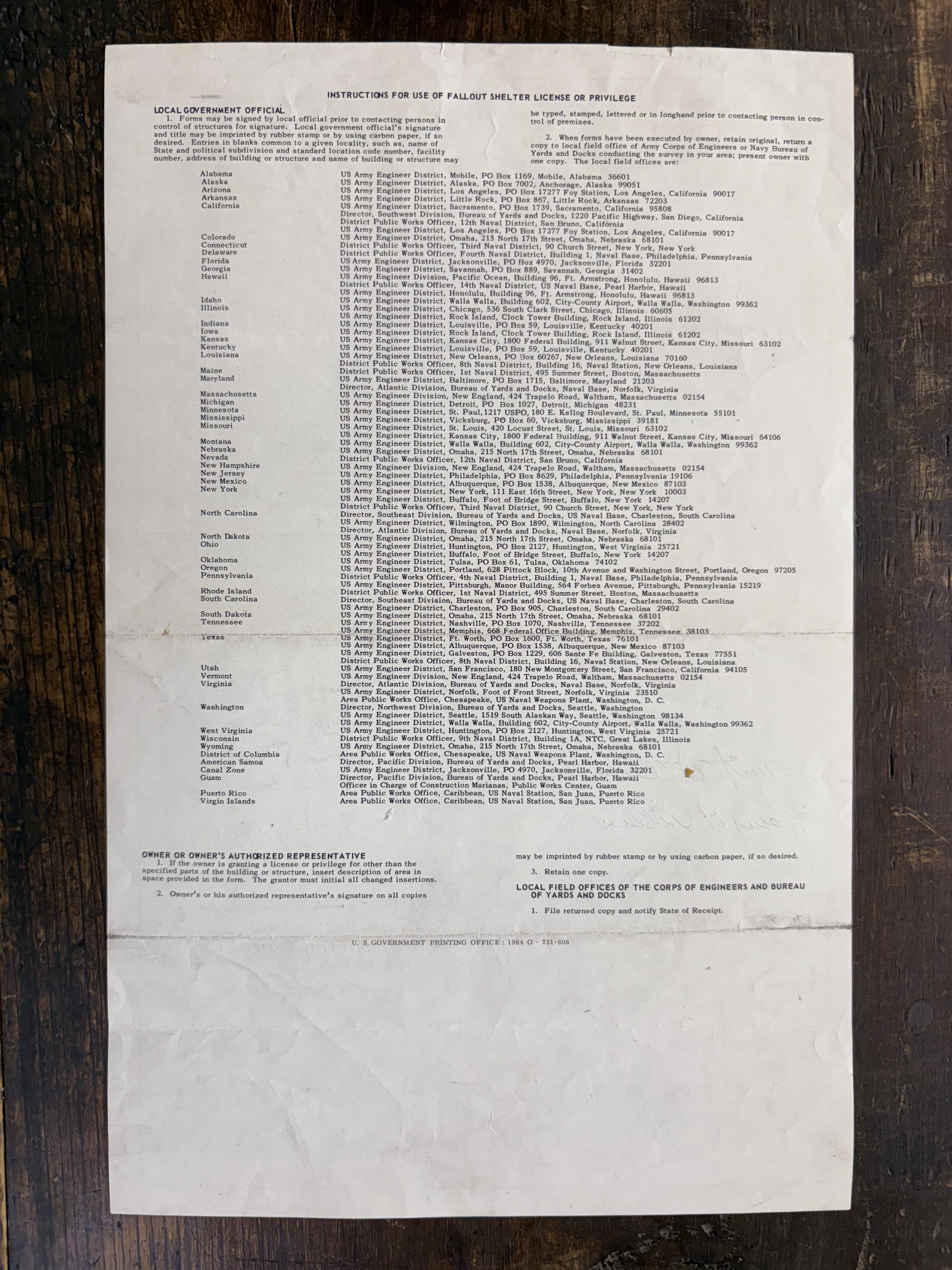
Fallout shelter license or privileges of Bristol Caverns (back)
