= Conulite =

Type of dripstone in soft sediment

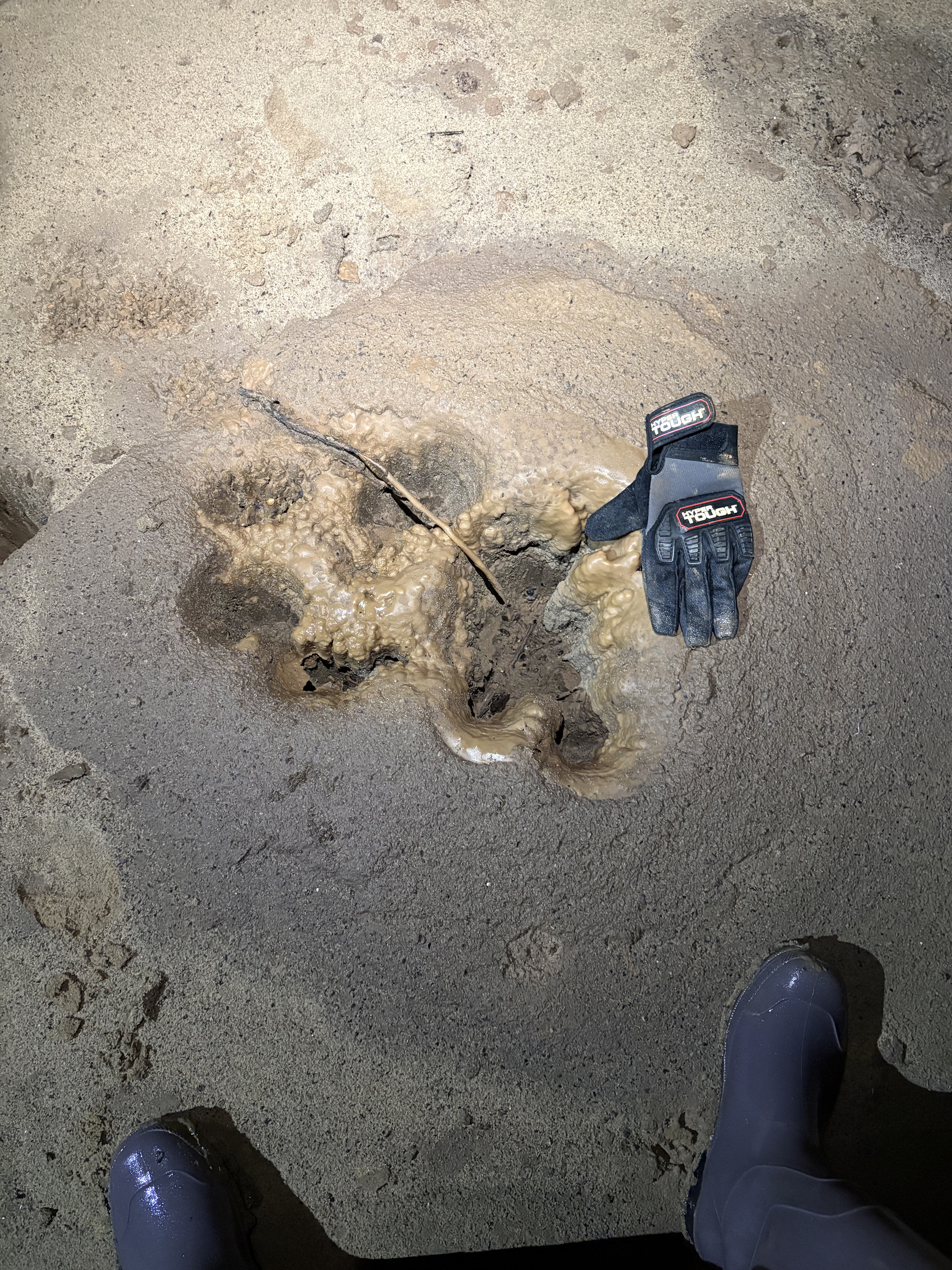
Conulite in Bristol Caverns (glove for scale)

A conulite, also called a mud cup, is a type of dripstone that forms when water drips into a soft sediment, both eroding the sediment and depositing calcite. Because they form in soft sediments when those sediments are washed away, these formations are left standing like ice cream cones stuck in mud. These formations can be white and often have cave pearls inside them.

When dripstones (specifically stalagmites) form, they will sometimes create a conulet first, making a kind of 'root' for the stalagmite.

== Variations ==
There are a few variations on cave conulites formed in very similar ways but different enough to have their own names.

- Cave birdbaths. These are low-angle conulites that often have a rim around the edge similar to that of a rimstone dam. These formations form on more silt of sand rich substrate.
- Cave fans. These are conulites that are not calcified all the way around their circumference. These formations look like fan coral, hence the name. The calcite crystals in this formation have a dendritic crystal structure.
- A raft splash cup is a conulite variation created when water drips into a pile of calcite rafts. As this happens, the rafts are fused together, creating a cup shape.

== Gallery ==
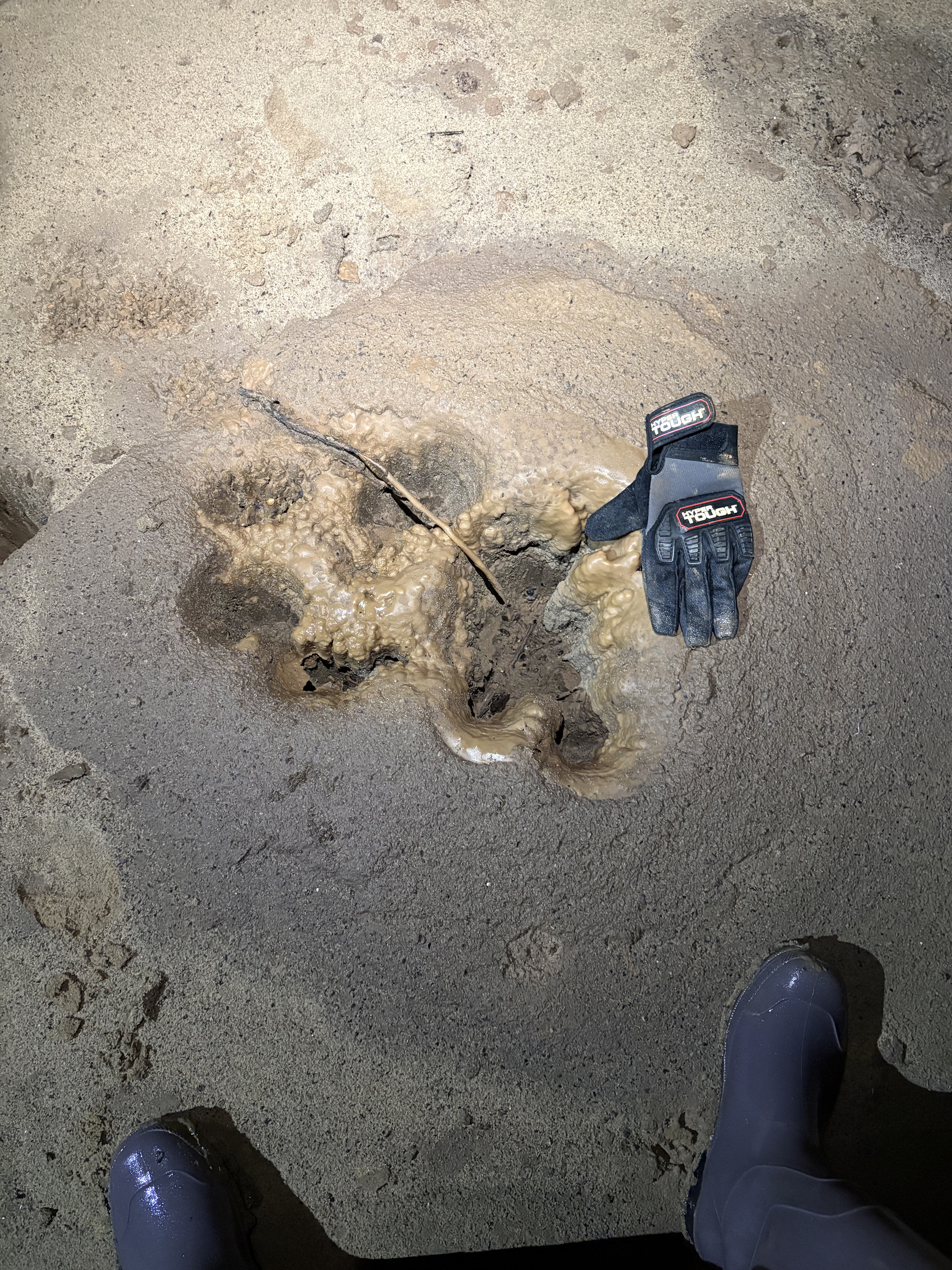
Conulite in Bristol Caverns (glove for scale)

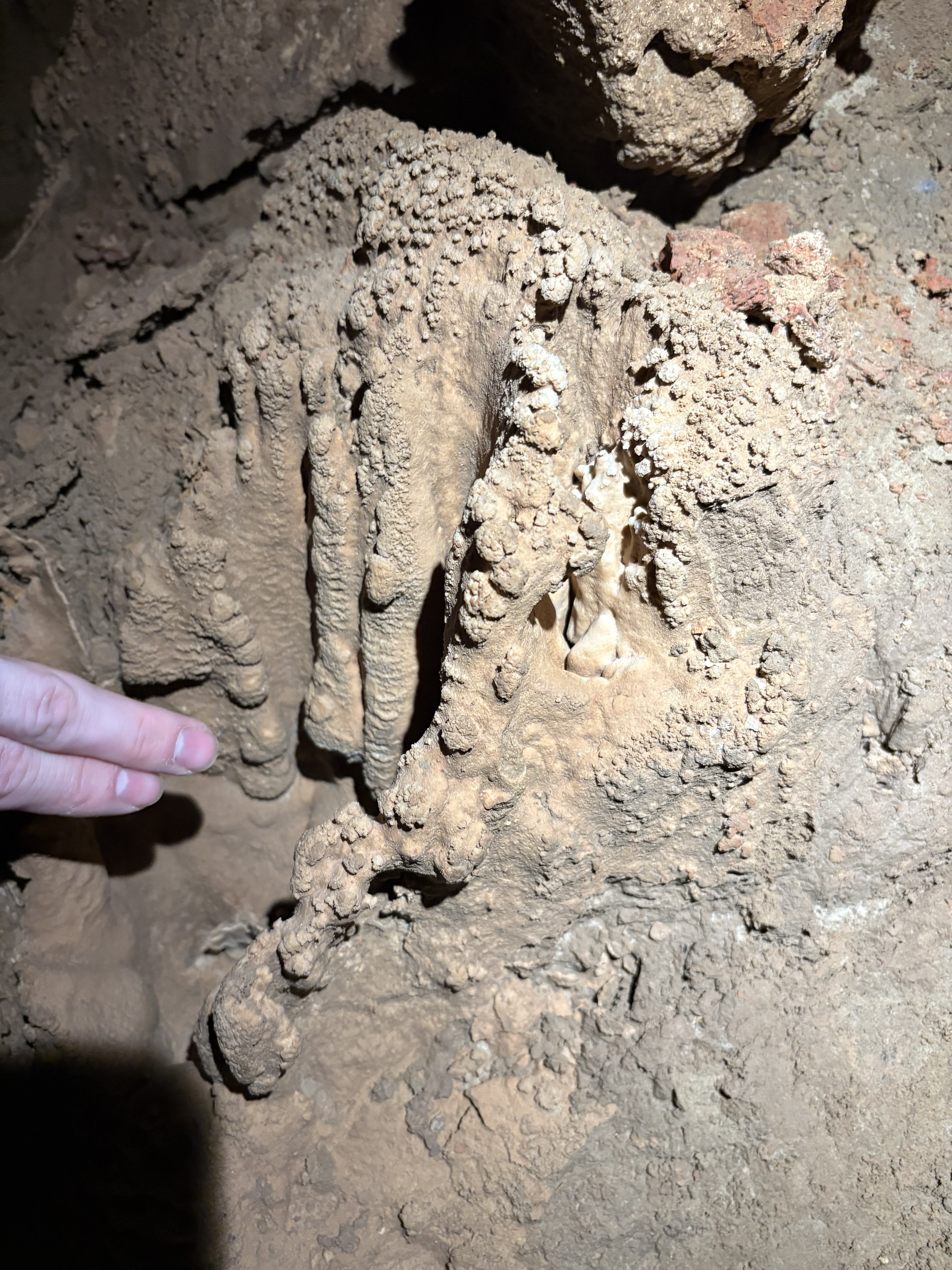
Conulite in Bristol Caverns
