= Worley's Cave =

Cave system in Tennessee, US

- Morrell Cave
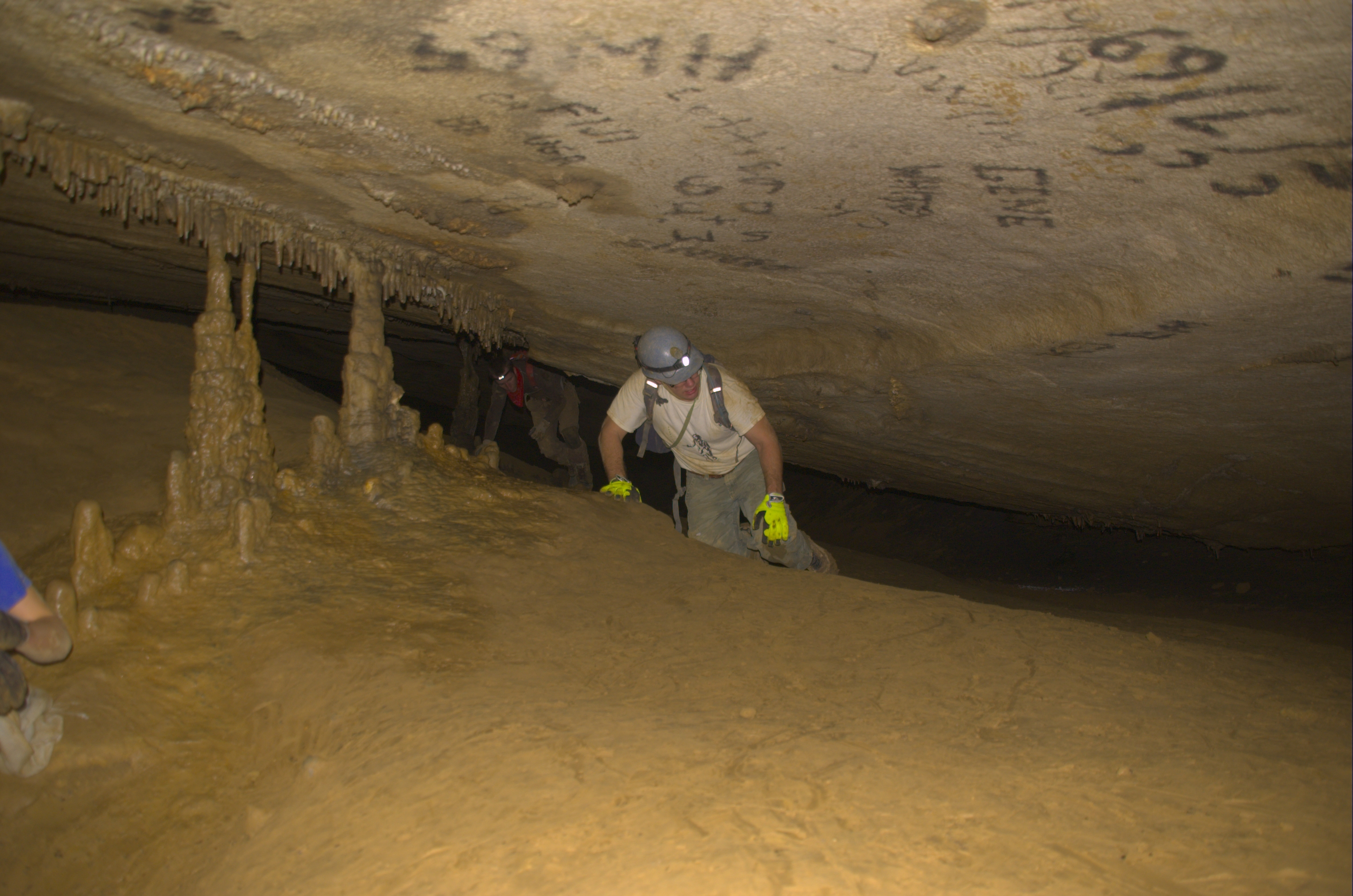
- Interactive map of Worley's Cave
- Coordinates: 36.4577°N 82.2273°W
- Length: 4.4 miles
- Entrances: 2
- Access: Public
- Website: https://www.worleyscave.co/

Worley's Cave, also known as Morrell Cave, is an extensive cave system, located in Sullivan County, Tennessee. It contains over 4 miles of surveyed passage. Access is public, and the owner charges a $10 fee and requires a signed liability waiver. The main passage is reported to be quite large, and has extensive side branches. The Morrell Cave name comes from John Morrell, and early trip leader in the cave. There was a successful cave rescue in 2024, as well as two others in 2011.
