= Grand Caverns =

Cave in Virginia, United States

- Weyer's Cave
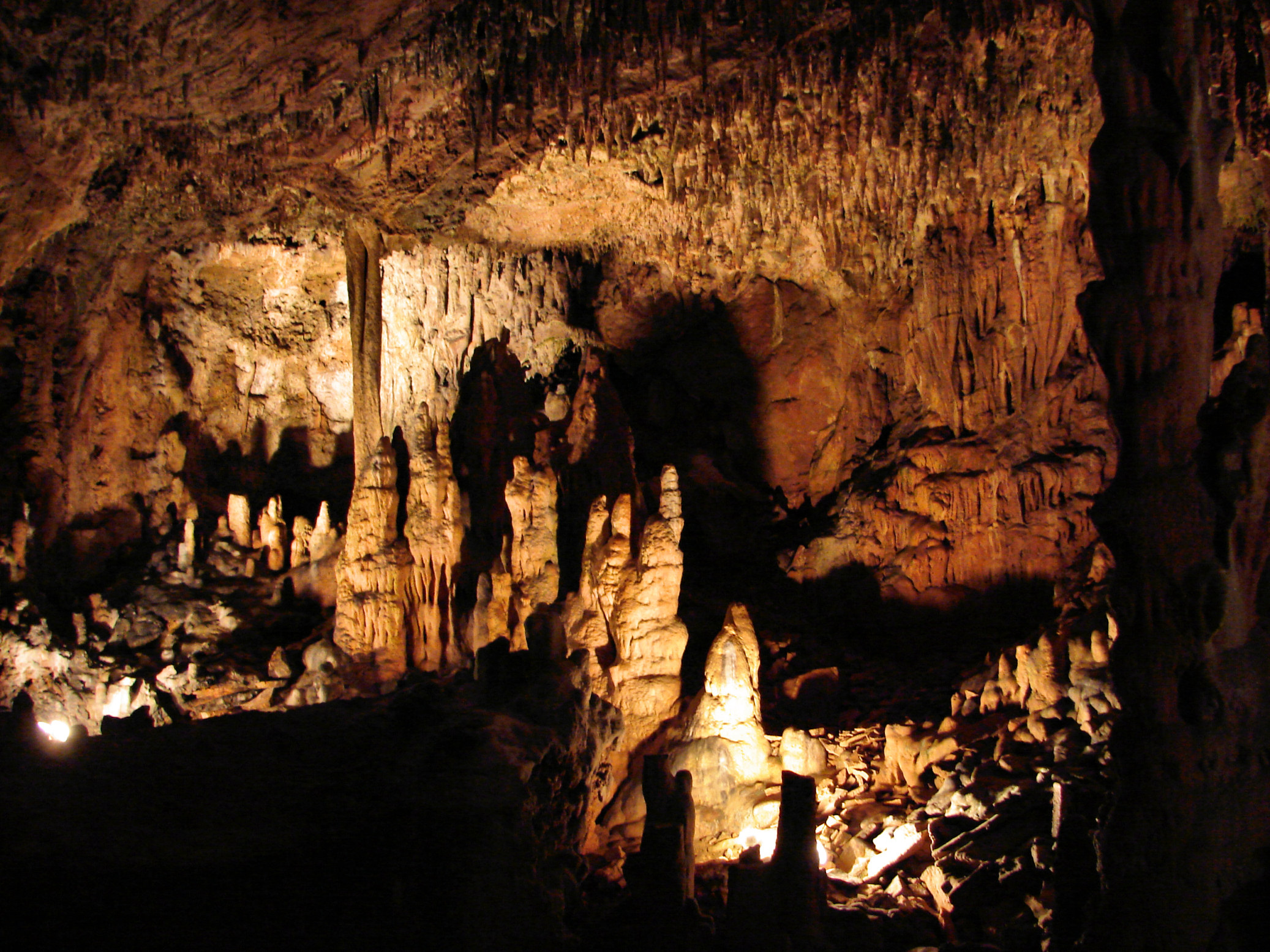

- Location within Shenandoah Valley Location within Virginia Location within the United States
- Location: Grottoes, Virginia
- Coordinates: 38°15′37″N 78°50′07″W
- Website: www.grandcaverns.com

U.S. National Natural Landmark
- Designated: 1973

Grand Caverns, formerly known as Weyer's Cave, is located in the central Shenandoah Valley in the town of Grottoes, Virginia, United States. A limestone cavern, it claims the distinction of being America's oldest show cave, in operation since 1806.

In 1973, the National Park Service designated the cave a National Natural Landmark in recognition of its shield formations and other features, such as flowstone, stalactites, and stalagmites.

== History ==
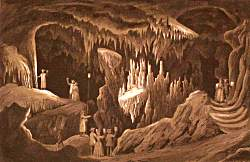
"The Drums, The Tapestry Room, Weyer's Cave"; Lithograph from Beyer (1858): Album of Virginia: Illustrations of the Old Dominion.

According to legend, the cavern system was discovered in 1804 by 17-year-old Bernard Weyer, manager of the local distillery, looking for a missing trap. Originally, it was called Amend's cave, named after the land's owner, Matthias Amend. In two years, Amend opened it for the public, one of the first show caves of the United States. The locals, however, preferred to name it after the original discoverer.

During the Civil War and the Valley Campaign, the cave was visited by both Confederate and Union soldiers. During their visits, over 230 soldiers signed their names on the cave's walls. One noted signature is that of W.W. Miles, signed on September 26, 1864. Once, Confederate General Stonewall Jackson was apparently camped near Port Republic and allowed his soldiers to visit the caverns.

From 1974 until October 2009 Grand Caverns was owned by the Upper Valley Regional Park Authority (UVRPA); they also claimed ownership of Natural Chimneys. In October 2009 Grand Caverns and its surrounding parks were given to the Town of Grottoes; the UVRPA has since dissolved.

In 2004, the Grand Caverns management requested that the Virginia Region chapter of the National Speleological Society conduct a re-survey of the cave system which had not been done since the 1930s. With completion of the re-survey in the original, commercial portion of the cave (2,651 meters or 8,698 feet), the cavers pushed through a 20-centimeter-high (7.9 in) passage, which led them to 3,432 meters (11,260 ft) of unexplored cave. The total surveyed passage now stands at 6,083 meters (19,957 ft; 3.780 mi) making Grand Caverns the 215th longest surveyed cave in the United States as of May 2008. The newly discovered portion of cave (closed to the public) is highly decorated with many forms of speleothems, including the celebrated shields. The passages to the north are fairly dry with abundant brilliant white formations, earning them the name "New Mexico". The southern portion of the new cave includes a series of large rooms with massive breakdown, the largest of which ("Kentucky") is over 100 meters (330 ft) long by 40 meters (130 ft) wide. The highest and lowest points in the cave are found in the new passage.

Grand Caverns is currently open seven days a week. Monday through Friday, tours typically run every hour from 10 a.m. until 5 p.m.; Saturday and Sunday tours run every 45 minutes starting at 9:30 a.m. and continuing until 5 p.m.

== Geology ==
The cave is developed in Cambrian limestone/dolomite, and is known for its abundance of shield formations. It is also replete with stalactites, stalagmites, columns (where stalactites and stalagmites meet), draperies and other flowstone formations. The most stately room, "Cathedral Hall", is 85 meters (280 ft) long and over 21 meters (70 ft) high. It is one of the largest rooms of any cavern in the eastern United States. Other sights include "Bridal Veil", "Stonewall Jackson's Horse", the "Tapestry Room", and "Dante's Inferno".

== Grounds and events ==
The caverns are surrounded by a tourist-driven area. Other activities in the park include hiking and biking trails, five picnic shelters for general use, a swimming pool, and a mini-golf course. The caverns also host an annual bluegrass festival.

== See also ==
- List of National Natural Landmarks in Virginia
