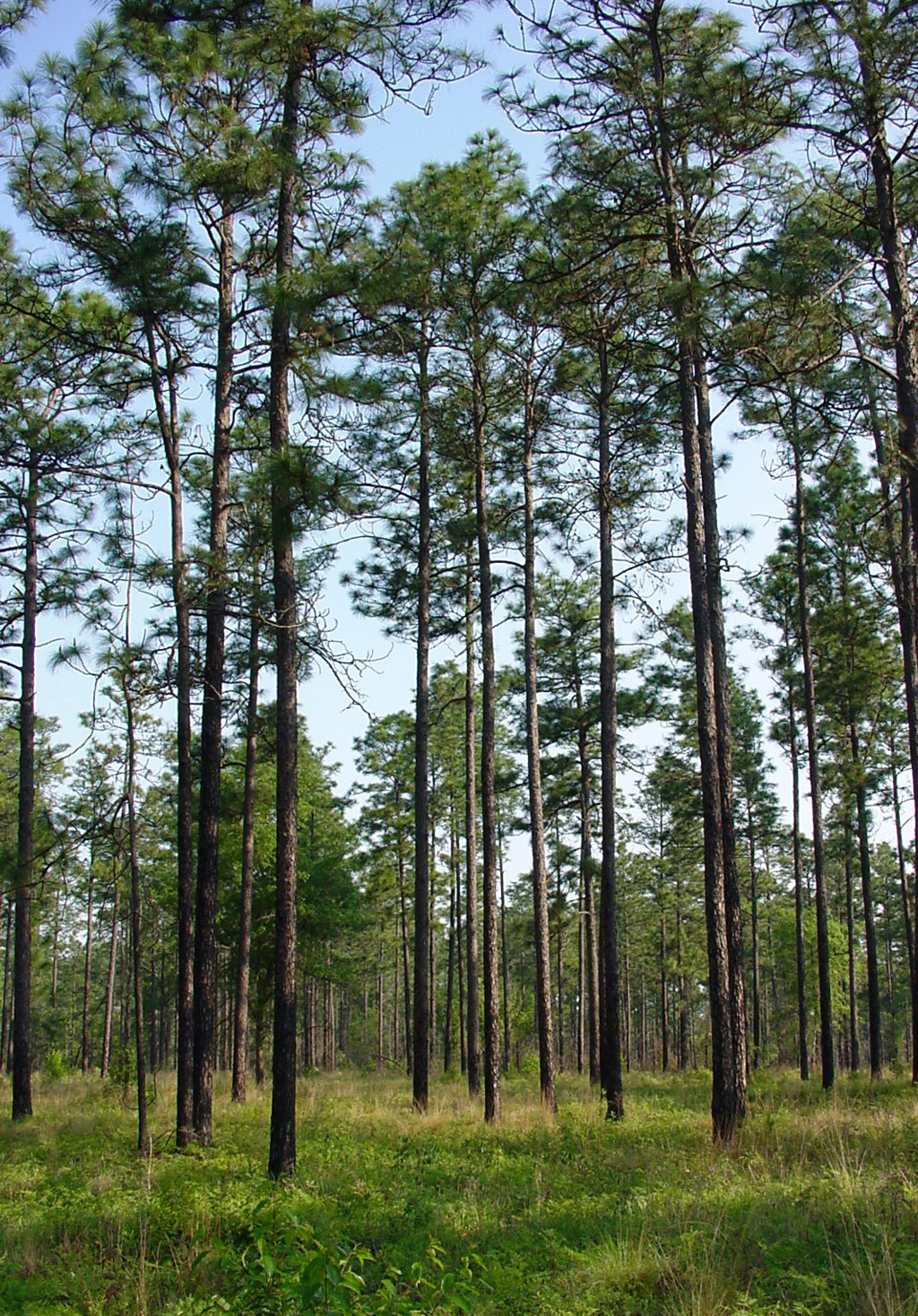
- Longleaf pine (Pinus palustris) forest

Conservation status
- Endangered (IUCN 3.1)

- Secure (NatureServe)

Scientific classification
- Kingdom: Plantae
- Clade: Tracheophytes
- Clade: Gymnosperms
- Division: Pinophyta
- Class: Pinopsida
- Order: Pinales
- Family: Pinaceae
- Genus: Pinus
- Subgenus: P. subg. Pinus
- Section: P. sect. Trifoliae
- Subsection: P. subsect. Australes
- Species: P. palustris

Binomial name
- Pinus palustris Mill.
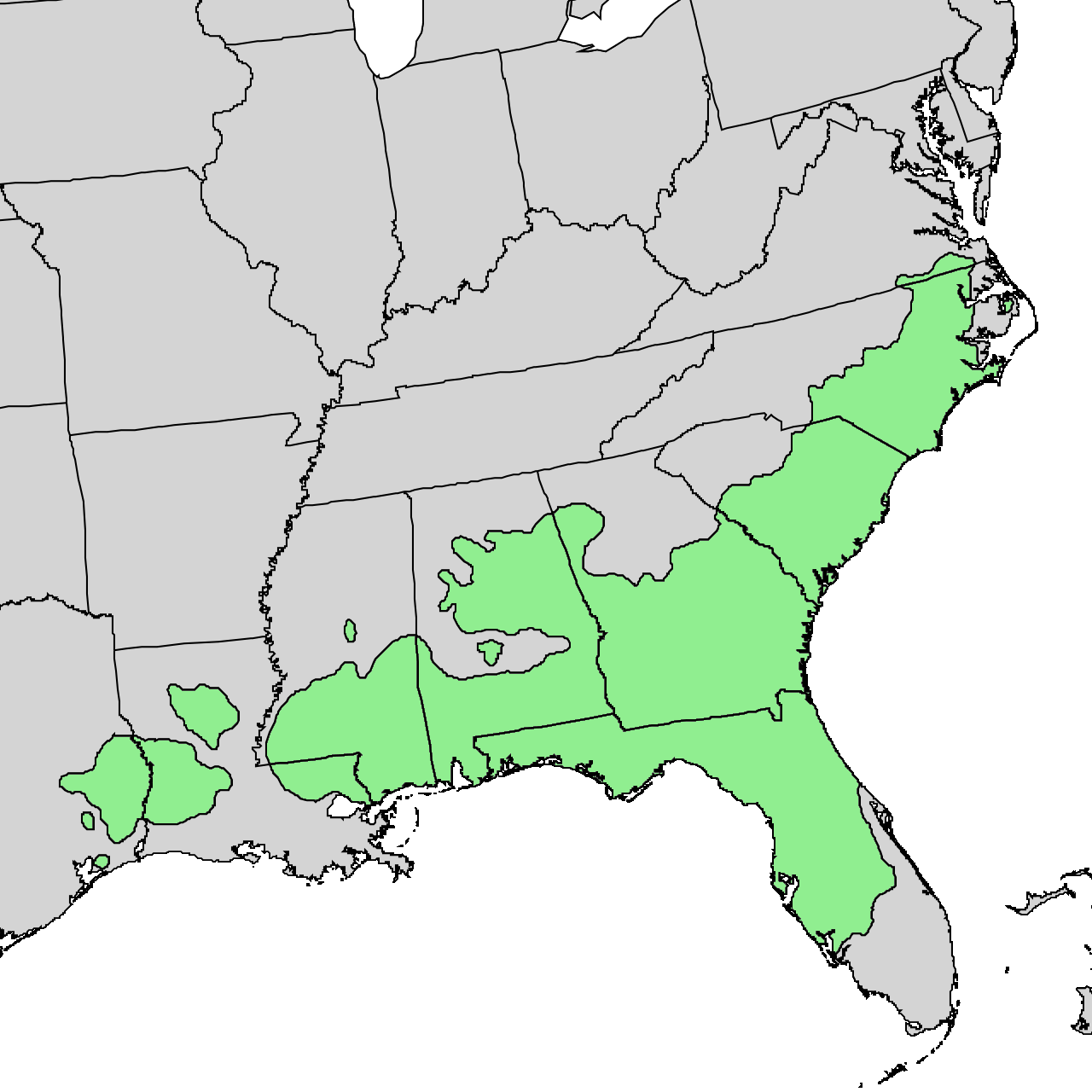

= Longleaf pine =

Species of plant (tree)

The longleaf pine (Pinus palustris) is a species of conifer in the family Pinaceae, a pine native to the Southeastern United States, found along the coastal plain from East Texas to southern Virginia, extending into northern and central Florida. In this area it is also known as "yellow pine" or "long leaf yellow pine", although it is properly just one out of a number of species termed yellow pine. It reaches a height of 30–35 m (98–115 ft) and a diameter of 0.7 m (28 in). In the past, before extensive logging, they reportedly grew to 47 m (154 ft) with a diameter of 1.2 m (47 in). The tree is a cultural symbol of the Southern United States, being the official state tree of Alabama. This particular species is one of the eight pine tree species that falls under the "Pine" designation as the state tree of North Carolina.

== Description ==
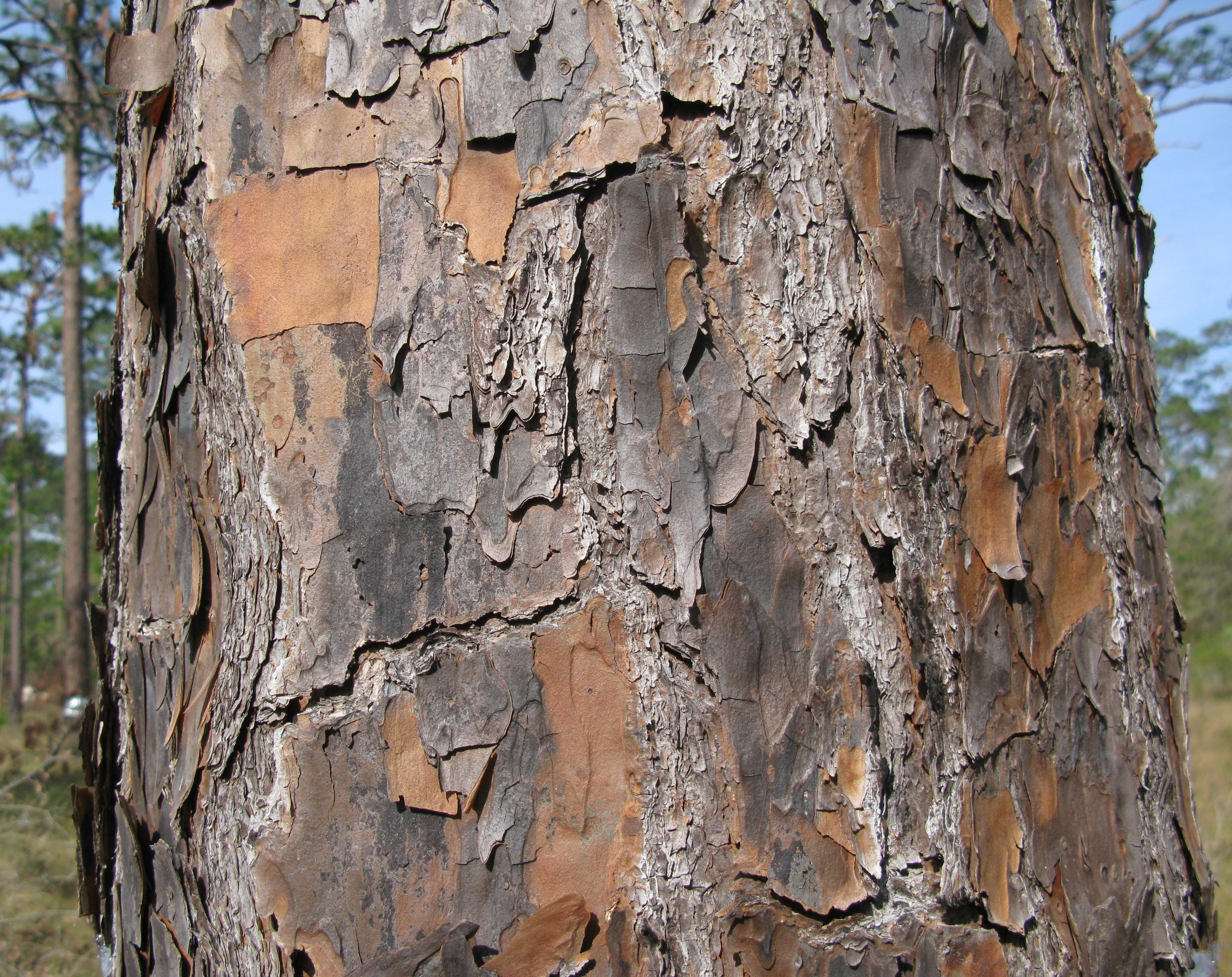
Close up of longleaf pine bark

The bark is thick, reddish-brown, and scaly. The leaves are dark green and needle-like, and occur in bundles of mainly three, sometimes two or four, especially in seedlings. They often are twisted and 20–45 centimetres (7 3/4–17 3/4 inches) in length. A local race of P. palustris in a cove near Rockingham, North Carolina, have needles up to 24 inches (61 centimeters ) in length. It is one of the two Southeastern U.S. pines with long needles, the other being slash pine.

The cones—female seed cones (ovulate strobili) and male pollen cones (staminate strobili)—begin to form during the growing season before buds emerge. Pollen cones begin forming in their buds in July, while seed conelets are formed during a relatively short period of time in August. Pollination occurs early the following spring, with the pollen cones 3–8 cm (1 1/4–3 1/4 in) long. The seed cones mature in about 20 months from pollination; when mature, they are yellow-brown in color, 15–25 cm (6–9 3/4 in) long, and 5–7 cm (2–2 3/4 in) broad, opening to 12 cm (4 3/4 in), and have a small, but sharp, downward-pointing spine on the middle of each scale. The seeds are 7–9 millimetres (1/4–3/8 in) long, with a 25–40 mm (1–1 5/8 in) wing.

Longleaf pine takes 100 to 150 years to become full size and may live to be 500 years old. When young, they grow a long taproot, which usually is 2–3 metres (6 1/2–10 feet) long; by maturity, they have a wide spreading lateral root system with several deep 'sinker' roots. They grow on well-drained, usually sandy soil, characteristically in pure stands. Longleaf pine is one of several species grouped as southern yellow pine or longleaf yellow pine. In the past, it was also known as pitch pine, but this name was dropped over confusion with pitch pine, Pinus rigida.

== Etymology ==
The species epithet palustris is Latin for "of the marsh" and indicates its common habitat. The scientific name meaning "of marshes" is a misunderstanding on the part of Philip Miller, who described the species, after seeing longleaf pine forests with temporary winter flooding.

== Ecology ==
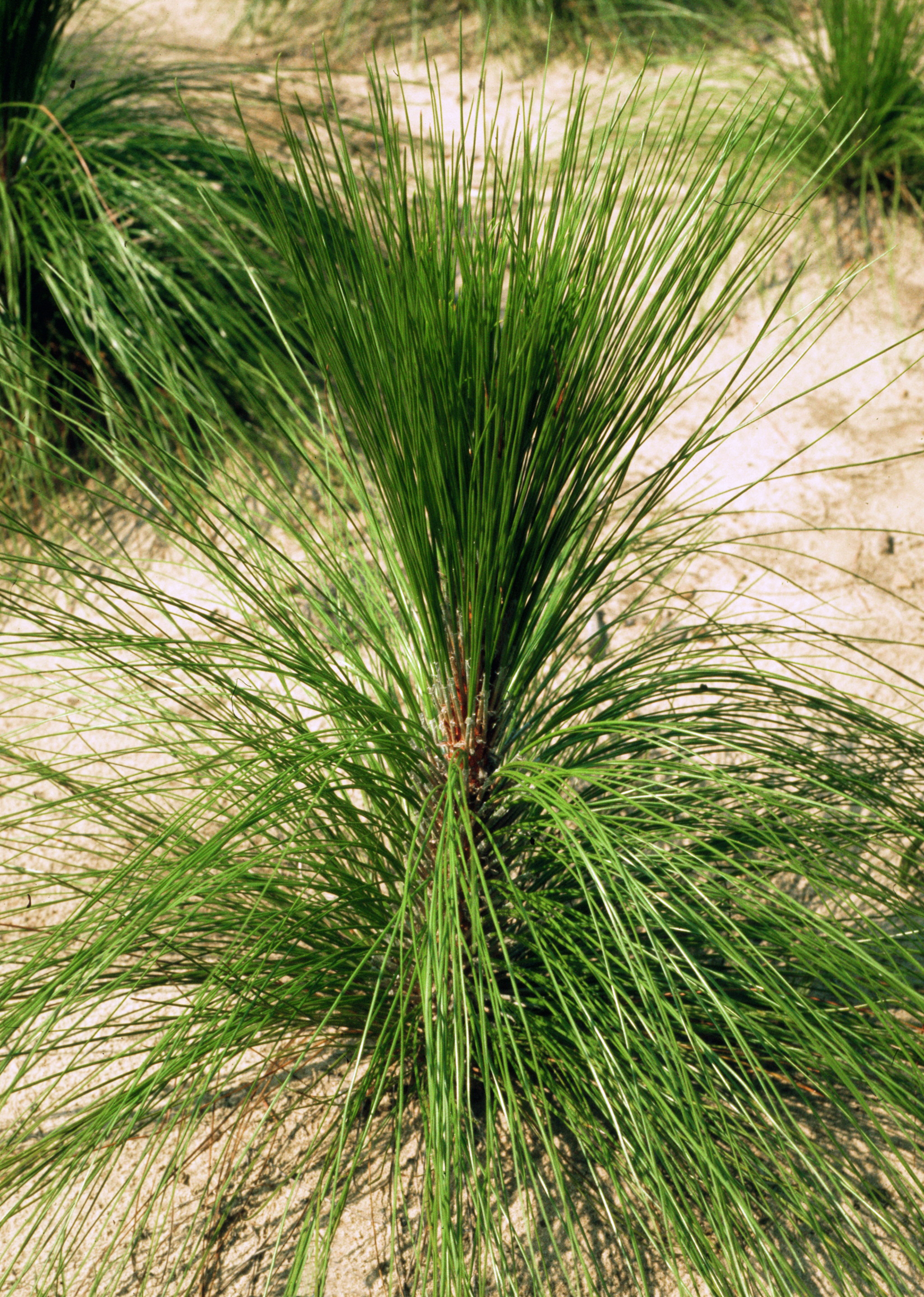
Longleaf pine: 'grass stage' seedling, near Georgetown, South Carolina

Longleaf pine is highly pyrophytic (resistant to wildfire) and dependent on fire. Their thick bark and growth habits help to provide a tolerance to fire. Periodic natural wildfire and anthropogenic fires select for this species by removing competition and exposing bare soil for successful germination of seeds. The lack of medium-tall trees (called a midstory canopy) leads to open longleaf pine forests or savannas. New seedlings do not appear at all tree-like and resemble a dark-green fountain of needles. This form is called the grass stage. During this stage, which lasts for 5–12 years, vertical growth is very slow, and the tree may take a number of years simply to grow ankle high. After that, it has a growth spurt, especially if it is in a gap or no tree canopy is above it. In the grass stage, it is very resistant to low intensity fires because the terminal bud is protected from lethal heating by the tightly packed needles. While relatively immune to fire at this stage, the plant is quite appealing to feral pigs; the early settlers' habit of releasing swine into the woodlands to feed may have been partly responsible for the decline of the species.

Longleaf pine forests are rich in biodiversity. They are well-documented for their high levels of plant diversity, in groups including sedges, grasses, carnivorous plants, and orchids. These forests also provide habitat for gopher tortoises, which as keystone species, dig burrows that provide habitat for hundreds of other species of animals. The red-cockaded woodpecker is dependent on mature pine forests and is now endangered as a result of this decline. Nine salamander species and 26 frog species are characteristic of pine savannas, along with 56 species of reptiles, 13 of which could be considered specialists on this habitat. Longleaf pine seeds are large and nutritious, forming a significant food source for birds (notably the brown-headed nuthatch) and other wildlife. Specifically, rodents and game birds, such as wild turkeys and the northern bobwhite feed on pine mast (hard-shelled seeds/nuts). Longleaf pines also feed white-tailed deer, the "only native large herbivore currently present in the longleaf pine woodlands". Additionally, these forests provide thermal cover, roosting, and escape from predators.

The Red Hills Region of Florida and Georgia is home to some of the best-preserved stands of longleaf pines. These forests have been burned regularly for many decades to encourage bobwhite quail habitat in private hunting plantations.

== Native range, restoration, and protection ==
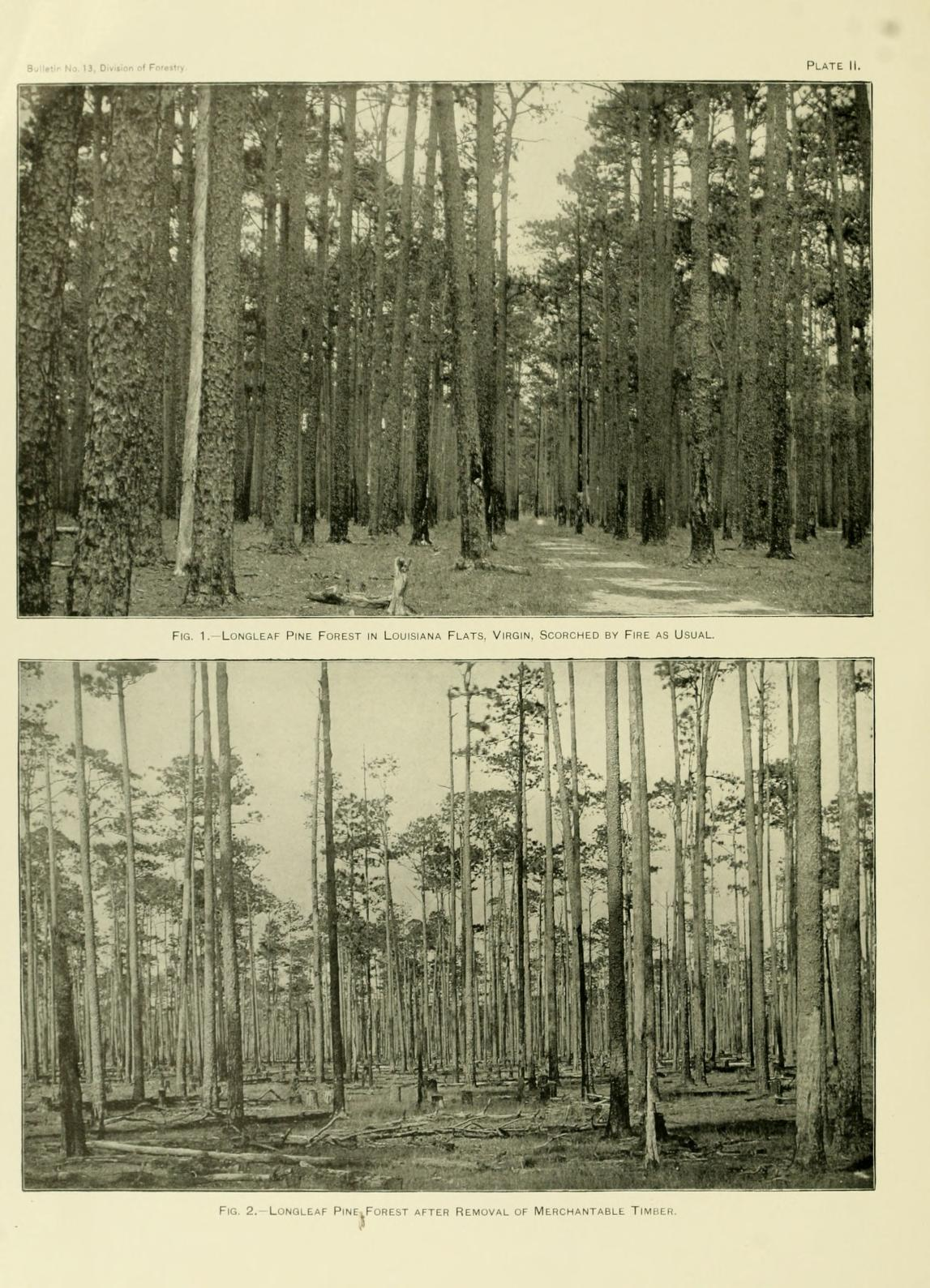
Old growth longleaf pine stand, scorched by fire (top); longleaf pine stand after timber removal (bottom)

Before European settlement, longleaf pine forest dominated as much as 90,000,000 acres (360,000 km^{2}) stretching from Virginia south to Florida and west to East Texas. Its range was defined by the frequent widespread fires that were lit by humans and occurred naturally throughout the southeast. In the late 19th century, these virgin timber stands were "among the most sought-after timber trees in the country." This rich ecosystem now has been relegated to less than 5% of its presettlement range due to fire suppression and clear-cutting practices:

As they stripped the woods of their trees, loggers left mounds of flammable debris that frequently fueled catastrophic fires, destroying both the remaining trees and seedlings. The exposed earth left behind by clear-cutting operations was highly susceptible to erosion, and nutrients were washed from the already porous soils. This further destroyed the natural seeding process. At the peak of the timber cutting in the 1890s and first decade of the new century, the longleaf pine forests of the Sandhills were providing millions of board feet of timber each year. The timber cutters gradually moved across the South; by the 1920s, most of the "limitless" virgin longleaf pine forests were gone.

— Jerry Simmons, "ASLC Large Operation from Beginnings"

In "pine barrens" most of the day. Low, level, sandy tracts; the pines wide apart; the sunny spaces between full of beautiful abounding grasses, liatris, long, wand-like solidago, saw palmettos, etc., covering the ground in garden style. Here I sauntered in delightful freedom, meeting none of the cat-clawed vines, or shrubs, of the alluvial bottoms.

– John Muir

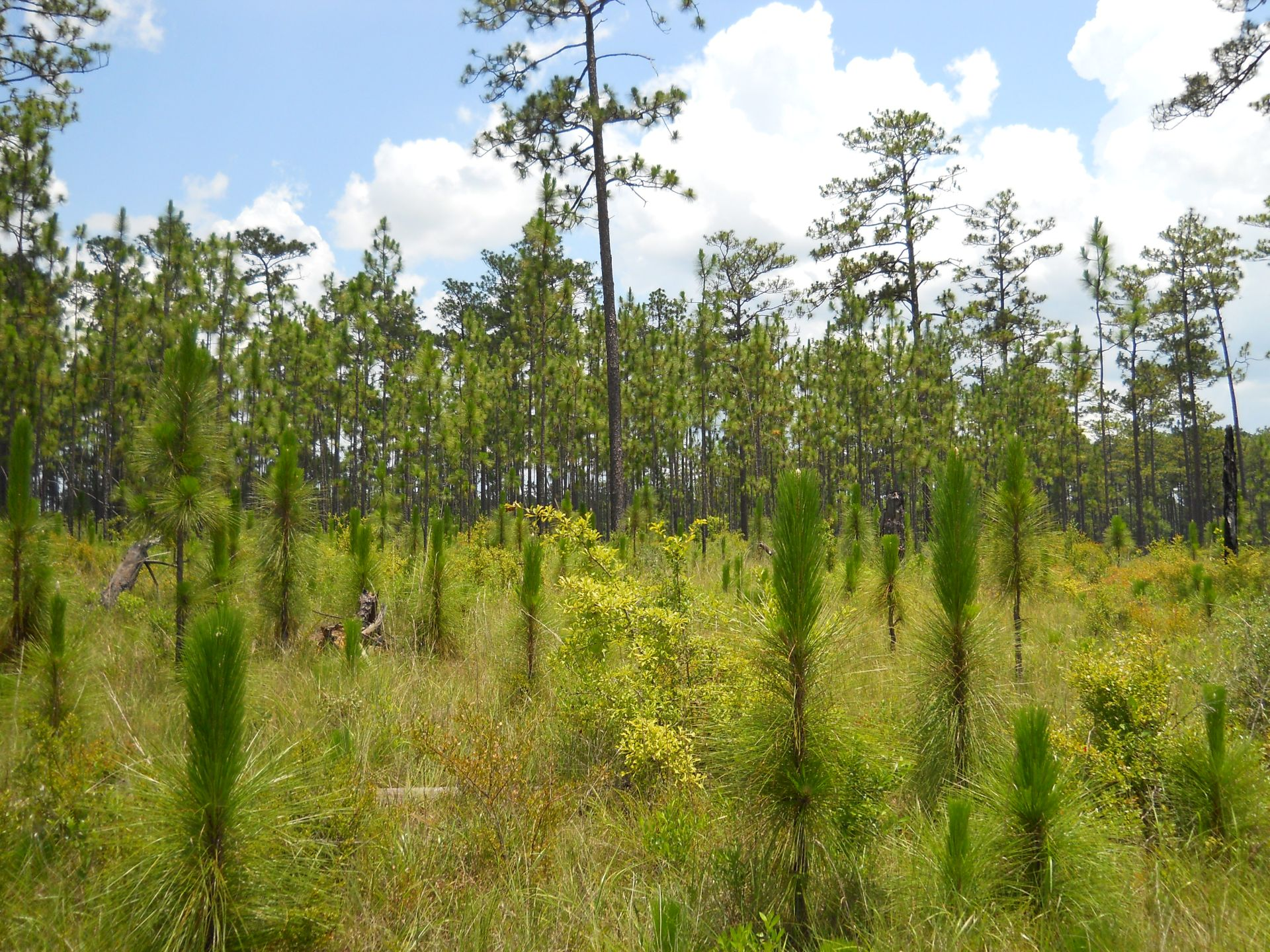
Naturally regenerated longleaf pines in DeSoto National Forest, Mississippi

Efforts are being made to restore longleaf pine ecosystems within its natural range. Some groups such as the Longleaf Alliance are actively promoting research, education, and management of the longleaf pine.

The USDA offers cost-sharing and technical assistance to private landowners for longleaf restoration through the NRCS Longleaf Pine Initiative. Similar programs are available through most state forestry agencies in the longleaf's native range. In August 2009, the Alabama Forestry Commission received $1.757 million in stimulus money to restore longleaf pines in state forests.

Four large core areas within the range of the species provide the opportunity to protect the biological diversity of the coastal plain and to restore wilderness areas east of the Mississippi River. Each of these four (Eglin Air Force Base: 187,000+ ha; Apalachicola National Forest: 228,000+ ha; Okefenokee-Osceola: 289,000+ ha; De Soto National Forest: 200,000+ ha) have nearby lands that offer the potential to expand the total protected territory for each area to well beyond 500,000 ha. These areas would provide the opportunity not only to restore forest stands, but also to restore populations of native plants and animals threatened by landscape fragmentation.

Notable eccentric populations exist within the Uwharrie National Forest in the central Piedmont region of North Carolina. These have survived owing to relative inaccessibility, and in one instance, intentional protection in the 20th century by a private landowner (a property now owned and conserved by the LandTrust for Central North Carolina).

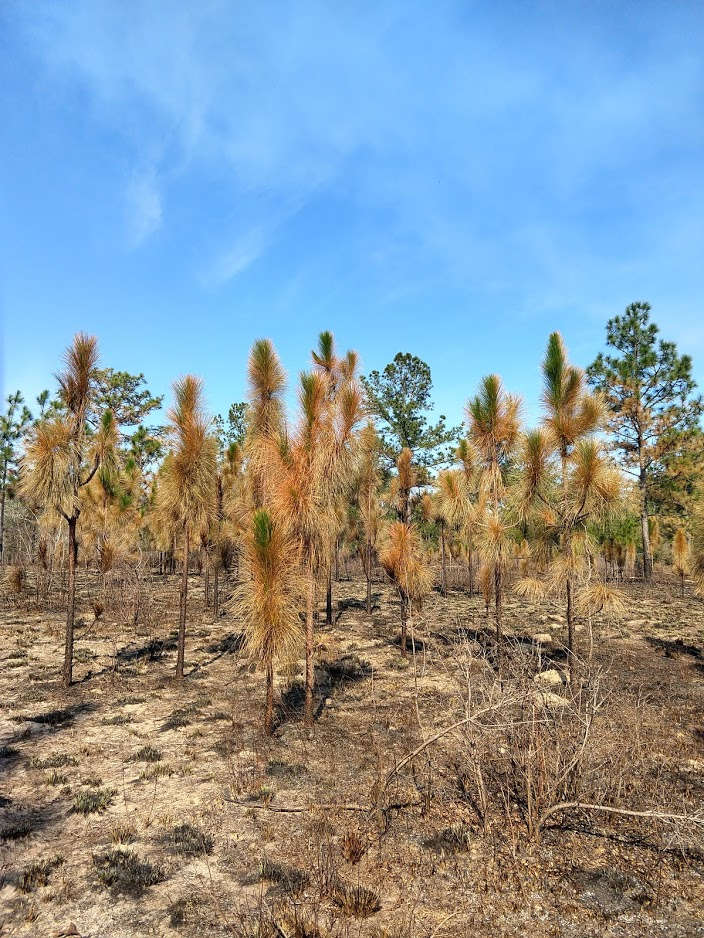
Longleaf pine saplings post-burn, all trees are still alive

The United States Forest Service is conducting prescribed burning programs in the 258,864-acre Francis Marion National Forest, located outside of Charleston, South Carolina. They are hoping to increase the longleaf pine forest type to 44,700 acres (181 km^{2}) by 2017 and 53,500 acres (217 km^{2}) in the long term. In addition to longleaf restoration, prescribed burning will enhance the endangered red-cockaded woodpeckers' preferred habitat of open, park-like stands, provide habitat for wildlife dependent on grass-shrub habitat, which is very limited, and reduce the risk of damaging wildfires.

Since the 1960s, longleaf restoration has been ongoing on almost 95,000 acres of state and federal land in the sandhills region of South Carolina, between the piedmont and coastal plain. The region is characterized by deep, infertile sands deposited by a prehistoric sea, with generally arid conditions. By the 1930s, most of the native longleaf had been logged, and the land was heavily eroded. Between 1935 and 1939, the federal government purchased large portions of this area from local landowners as a relief measure under the Resettlement Administration. These landowners were resettled on more fertile land elsewhere. Today, the South Carolina Sand Hills State Forest comprises about half of the acreage, and half is owned by the United States Fish and Wildlife Service as the adjacent Carolina Sandhills National Wildlife Refuge. At first, restoration of forest cover was the goal. Fire suppression was practiced until the 1960s, when prescribed fire was introduced on both the state forest and the Sandhills NWR as part of the restoration of the longleaf/wiregrass ecosystem.

Nokuse Plantation is a 53,000-acre private nature preserve located around 100 miles east of Pensacola, Florida. The preserve was established by M.C. Davis, a wealthy philanthropist who made his fortune buying and selling land and mineral rights, and who has spent $90 million purchasing land for the preserve, primarily from timber companies. One of its main goals is the restoration of longleaf pine forest, to which end he has had 8 million longleaf pine seedlings planted on the land.

A 2009 study by the National Wildlife Federation says that longleaf pine forests will be particularly well adapted to environmental changes caused by climate disruption.

In 2023, the Virginia Department of Conservation and Recreation announced a plan to reintroduce longleaf pines to the Dendron Swamp Natural Area Preserve, with seedlings propagated from cones collected at South Quay Sandhills Natural Area Preserve.

== Uses ==
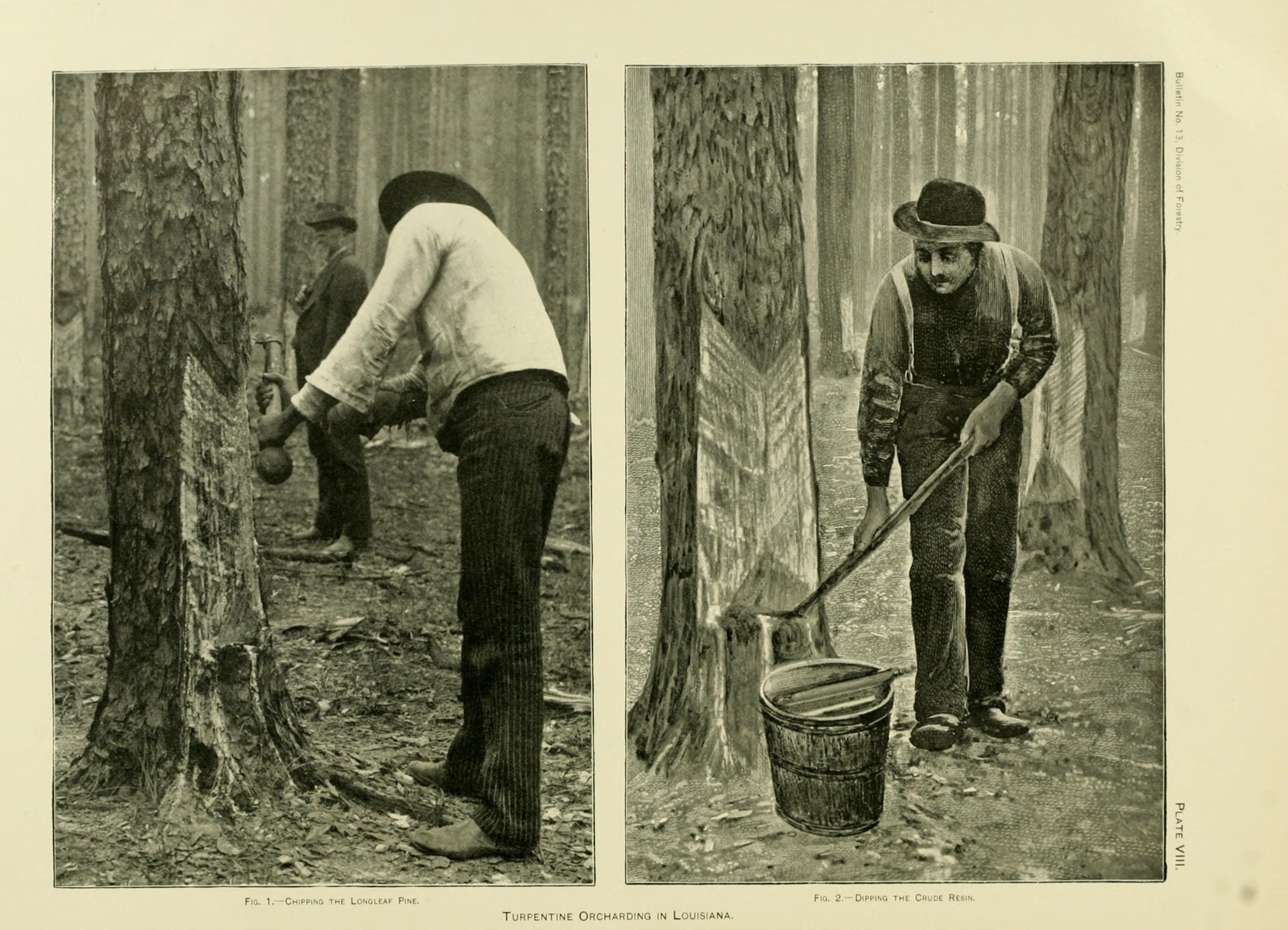
Men shown harvesting resin from longleaf pine trees

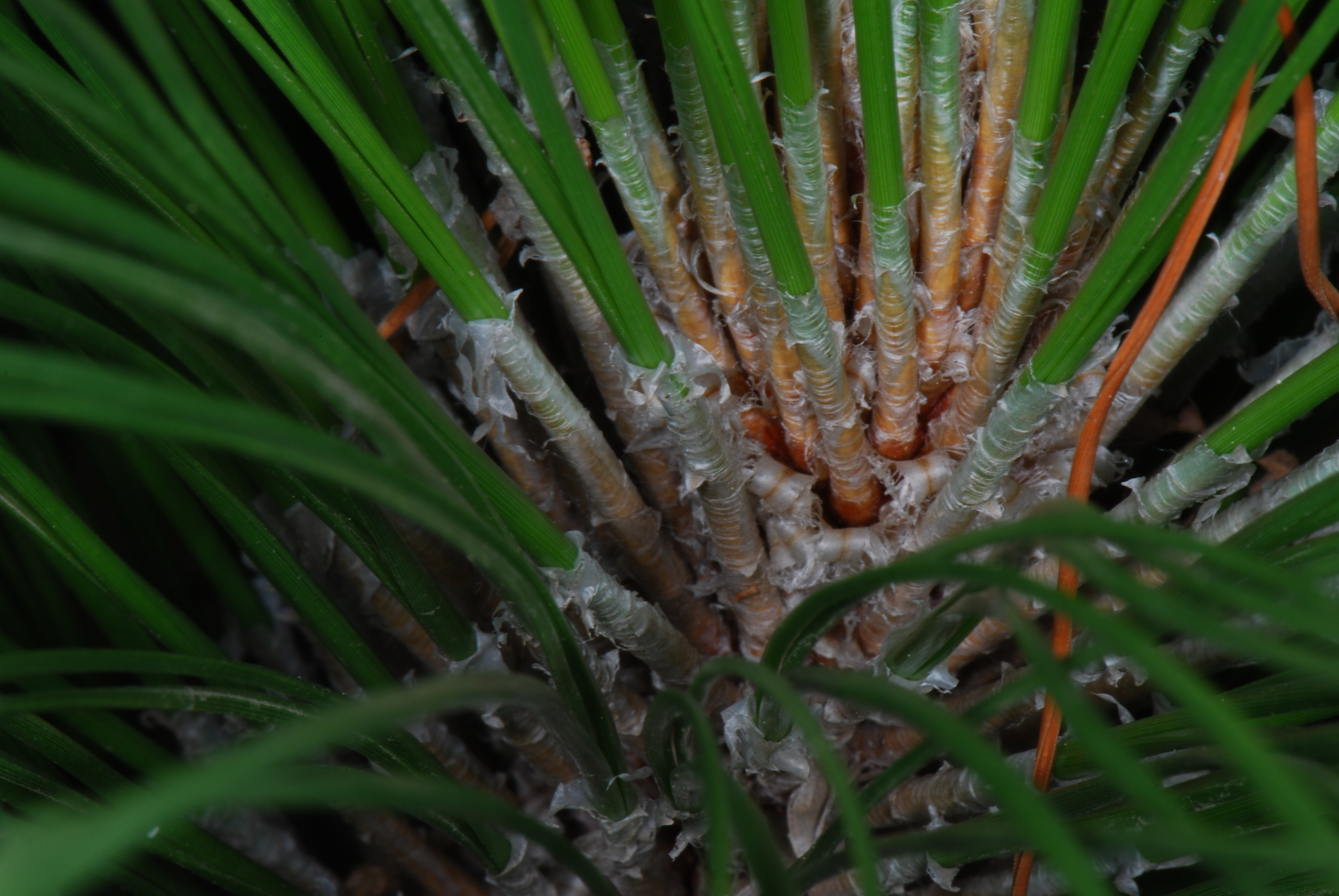
Pinus palustris close-up

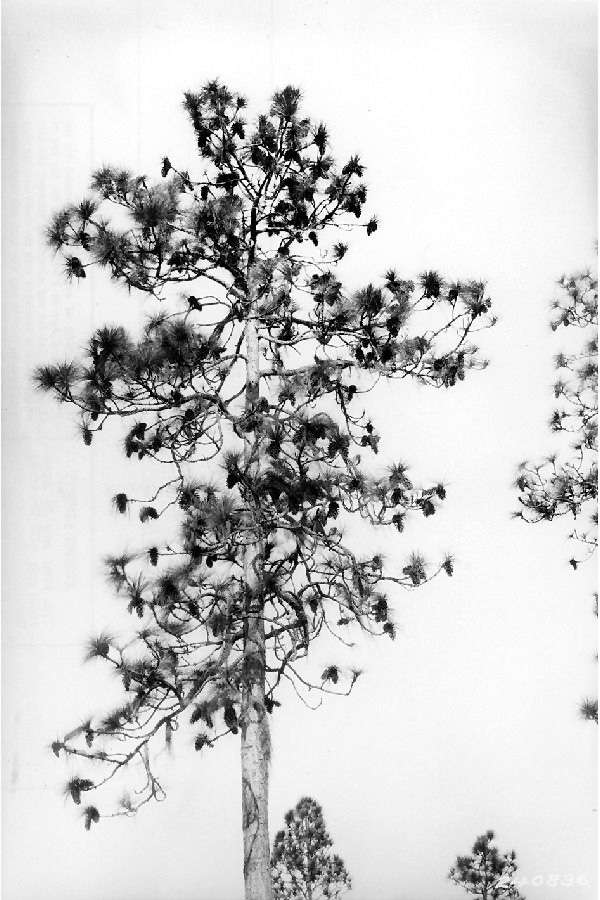
Mature longleaf pine tree with a prolific number of seed cones. Lake City, Florida, 1929

Vast forests of longleaf pine once were present along the southeastern Atlantic coast and Gulf Coast of North America, forming savannahs and woodlands that covered large portions of the Coastal Plain. These forests were the source of naval stores – resin, turpentine, and timber – needed by merchants and the navy for their ships. They have been cutover since for timber and usually replaced with faster-growing loblolly pine and slash pine, for agriculture, and for development. Due to this deforestation and overharvesting, at its lowest point in the 1990s, only about 1.3 million hectares (3.2 million acres) of longleaf pine forest remained: roughly 5% of its original range. Although now replaced across most of its range by loblolly pine plantations, conservation efforts did slightly raise the area of longleaf forest cover to 2.3 million ha (5.6 million ac) by 2023. Despite its decline on the landscape, longleaf pine is available at many nurseries within its range; the southernmost known point of sale is in Lake Worth Beach, Florida.

The yellow, resinous wood is used for lumber and pulp. Boards cut years ago from virgin timber were very wide, up to 1 m (3.3 ft), and a thriving salvage business obtains these boards from demolition projects to be reused as flooring in upscale homes.

The extremely long needles are popular for use in the ancient craft of coiled basket making.

Annual sales of pine straw for use as mulch were estimated at $200M in 2021.

The stumps and taproots of old trees become saturated with resin and will not rot. Farmers sometimes find old buried stumps in fields, even in some that were cleared a century ago, and these usually are dug up and sold as fatwood, "fat lighter", or "lighter wood", which is in demand as kindling for fireplaces, wood stoves, and barbecue pits. In old-growth pine, the heartwood of the bole is often saturated in the same way. When boards are cut from the fat lighter wood, they are very heavy and will not rot, but buildings constructed of them are quite flammable and make extremely hot fires.

The seeds of the longleaf pine are edible raw or roasted.

== Culture ==
The longleaf pine is the official state tree of Alabama. It is referenced by name in the first line of the official North Carolina State Toast. Also, the state's highest honor is named the "Order of the Long Leaf Pine". The state tree of North Carolina is officially designated as simply "pine", under which this and seven other species fall.

== See also ==
- Longleaf pine ecosystem
- Mountain Longleaf National Wildlife Refuge
- Sonderegger pine, a hybrid between loblolly and longleaf species
