= List of National Natural Landmarks in Virginia =

The following table lists the ten National Natural Landmarks within Virginia in the eastern United States. They are administered by the United States National Park Service.

Virginia National Natural Landmarks (clickable map)

Name	Image	Date	Location	County	Ownership	Description
Butler Cave- Breathing Cave		1973		Bath	Private	Two major cave systems that contain a 40-foot (12 m) waterfall, a natural bridge, unusually fine crystalline formations, and an underground lake. Access is managed by the Butler Cave Conservation Society.
Caledon Natural Area		1974	38.3525°N 77.132778°W	King George	State (state park)	One of the best examples of oak-tulip poplar-dominated virgin upland forest in the country.
Charles C. Steirly Natural Area	Charles C. Steirly Natural Area	1974	37.050833°N 76.981111°W	Sussex	State (Natural Area Preserve)	A small, essentially virgin stand of climax bald cypress-water tupelo swamp forest.
Grand Caverns	Grand Caverns	1973	38.260278°N 78.835278°W	Augusta	Municipal	Contains unique shield formations as well as draperies, flowstone, stalactites and stalagmites.
Great Dismal Swamp	Great Dismal Swamp	1972	36.640876°N 76.451797°W	Suffolk City	Federal (National Wildlife Refuge)	A remnant of the original Great Dismal Swamp.
Luray Caverns	Luray Caverns	1973	38.664306°N 78.483806°W	Page	Private	A cave ornately decorated with cascades, columns, stalactites, stalagmites and pools.
Montpelier Forest		1987	38.219722°N 78.169444°W	Orange	Private	A mature forest dominated primarily by tulip poplar and spicebush, located on the grounds of President James Madison's Montpelier estate.
Rich Hole		1974	37.871389°N 79.638333°W	Rockbridge	Federal (George Washington National Forest)	An outstanding example of a "cove" hardwood forest.
Seashore Natural Area		1965	36.906111°N 76.015278°W	Virginia Beach	State (state park)	Contains parallel dunes that are densely wooded with two distinct forest types of semitropical character.
Virginia Coast Reserve		1979	37.4163°N 75.689°W	Accomack, Northampton	Private	Relatively undisturbed barrier island-lagoon complex. A refuge for migratory shorebirds, waterfowl and colonial nesting birds.

== See also ==
- List of National Historic Landmarks in Virginia
