= Scalloping (cave feature) =

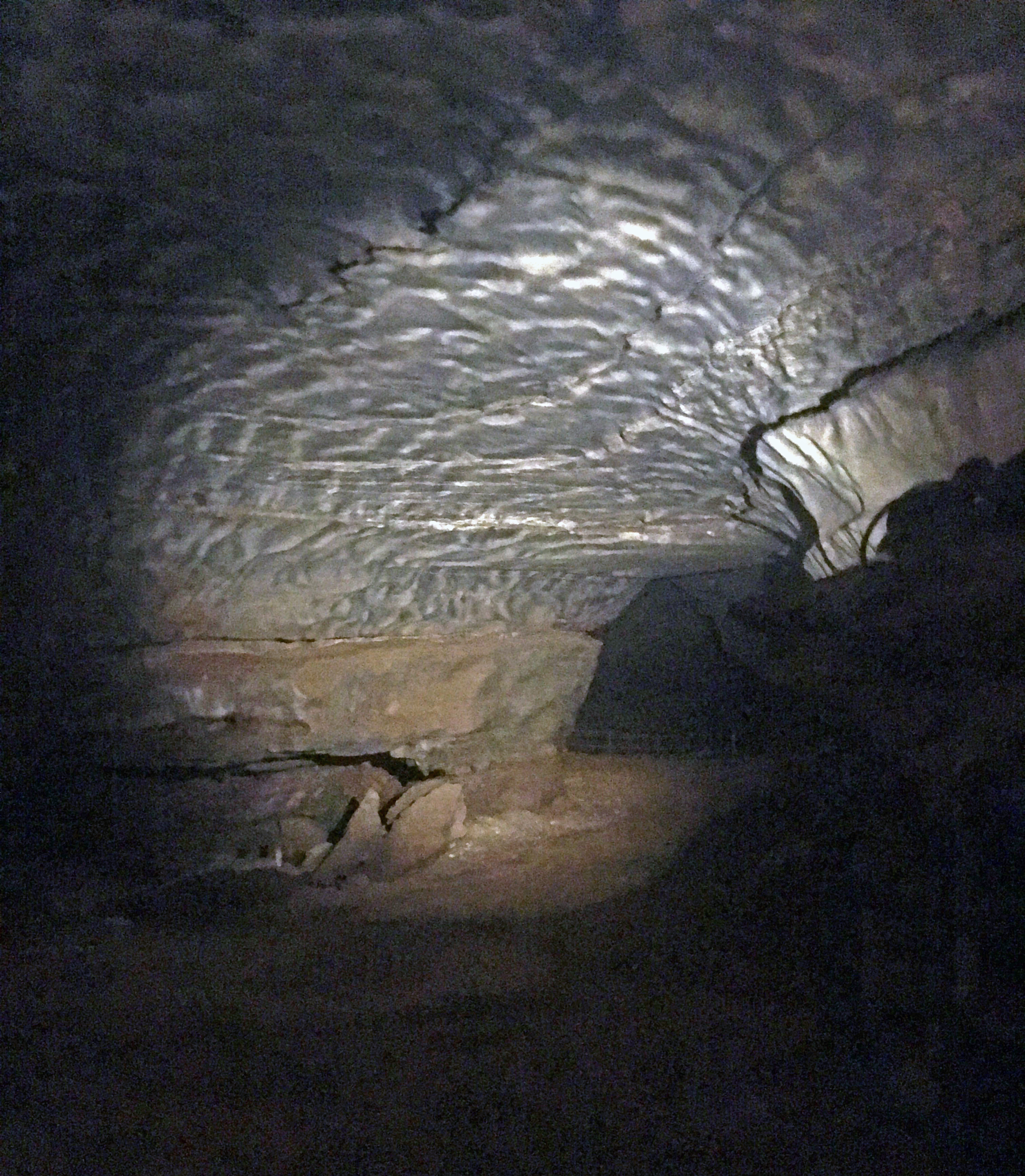
Scallops in Mammoth Cave National Park

Scalloping is a particular form of sculpting of the walls of limestone caves through dissolution by turbulently flowing water containing dissolved carbon dioxide (carbonic acid). Individual scallops are shallow concave features found on many cave surfaces which are or have at some time been in prolonged contact with a water current. They typically occur in large numbers abutting one another, entirely covering sections of cave passage, and can vary in size from less than a centimetre to many tens of centimetres or more. Their size is in inverse proportion to the speed of the current in which they formed; smaller scallops imply faster flow, larger scallops imply slower flow.

Scallops are normally asymmetric with the steeper curve facing down-current. In now dry cave passages, they can therefore be used to gauge the direction of flow of the former current (in a once phreatic system, i.e. water-filled tube, that flow might have been downhill or uphill).

Sets of scallops are examples of speleogens, which are erosional features as opposed to speleothems which are depositional features. Both are associated with speleogenesis or cave-formation.

Similar features can form on the walls of ice caves through the action of wind.
