= Speleogen =

Cave features created by erosion of bedrock

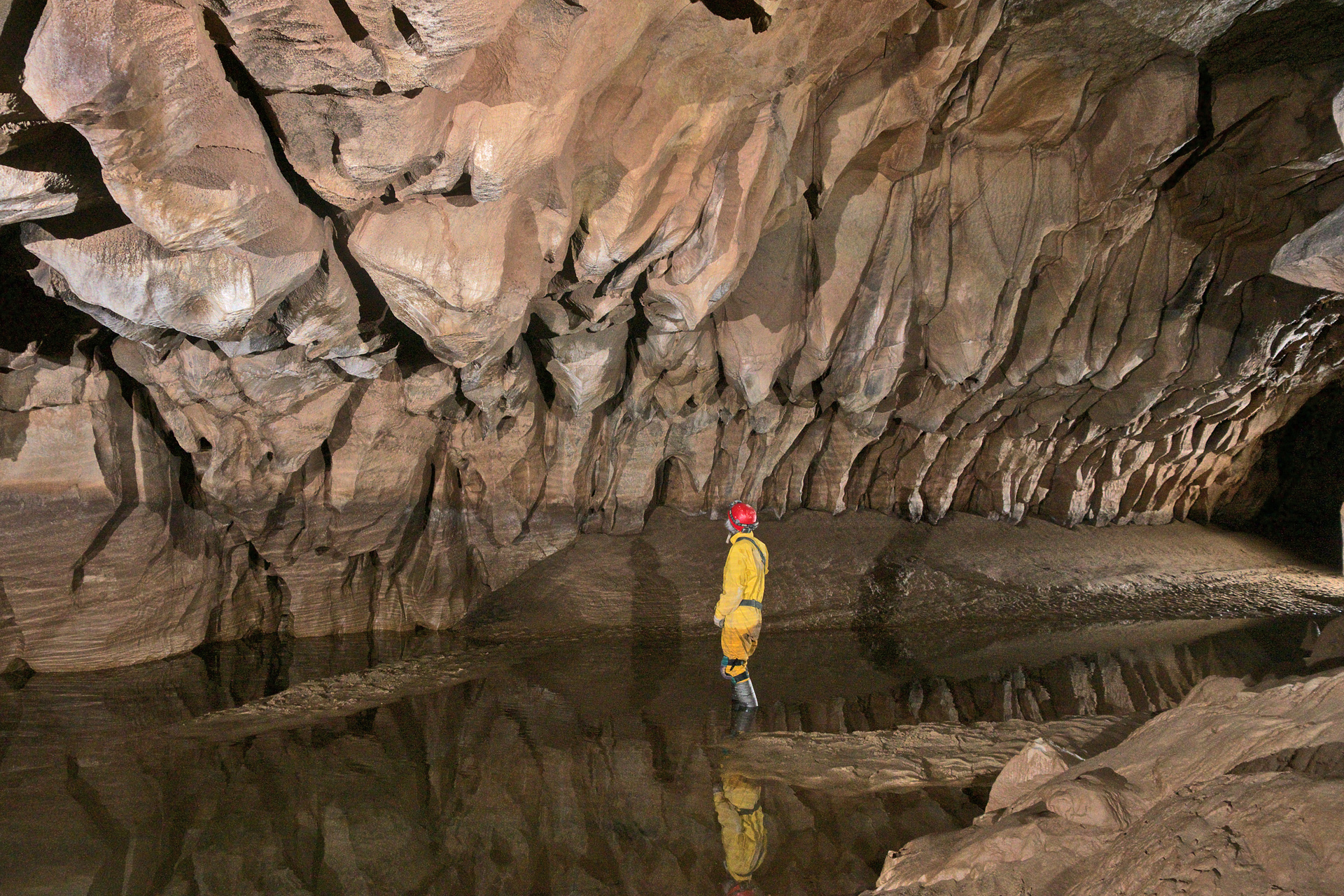
Speleogens in a West Virginia cave

A speleogen is a geological feature within a karst system that is created by the dissolution of bedrock. As rain water falls through the atmosphere it picks up carbon dioxide and more as it passes through organic material in the soil. As water moves through joints and cracks in calcium carbonate bedrock, more dissolution of the bedrock occurs and the bedrock features that are left are the speleogens. This process called speleogenesis is what leads to secondary formations or speleothems.

The United States Code defines speleogens as "relief features on the walls, ceiling, and floor of any cave or lava tube which are part of the surrounding bedrock, including anastomoses, scallops, meander niches, petromorphs and rock pendants in solution caves and similar features unique to volcanic caves."

"Speleogens are irregular or distinctive shapes of carbonate rock etched from bedrock by dripping or running water. Speleogens can form where bedrock is not uniform in chemical composition. Consequently, the less soluble rock dissolves slower than adjacent more soluble rock through time. The less soluble rock tends to stand in relief and projects from walls and ceilings of caves."
