= Speleothem =

Structure formed in a cave by the deposition of minerals from water

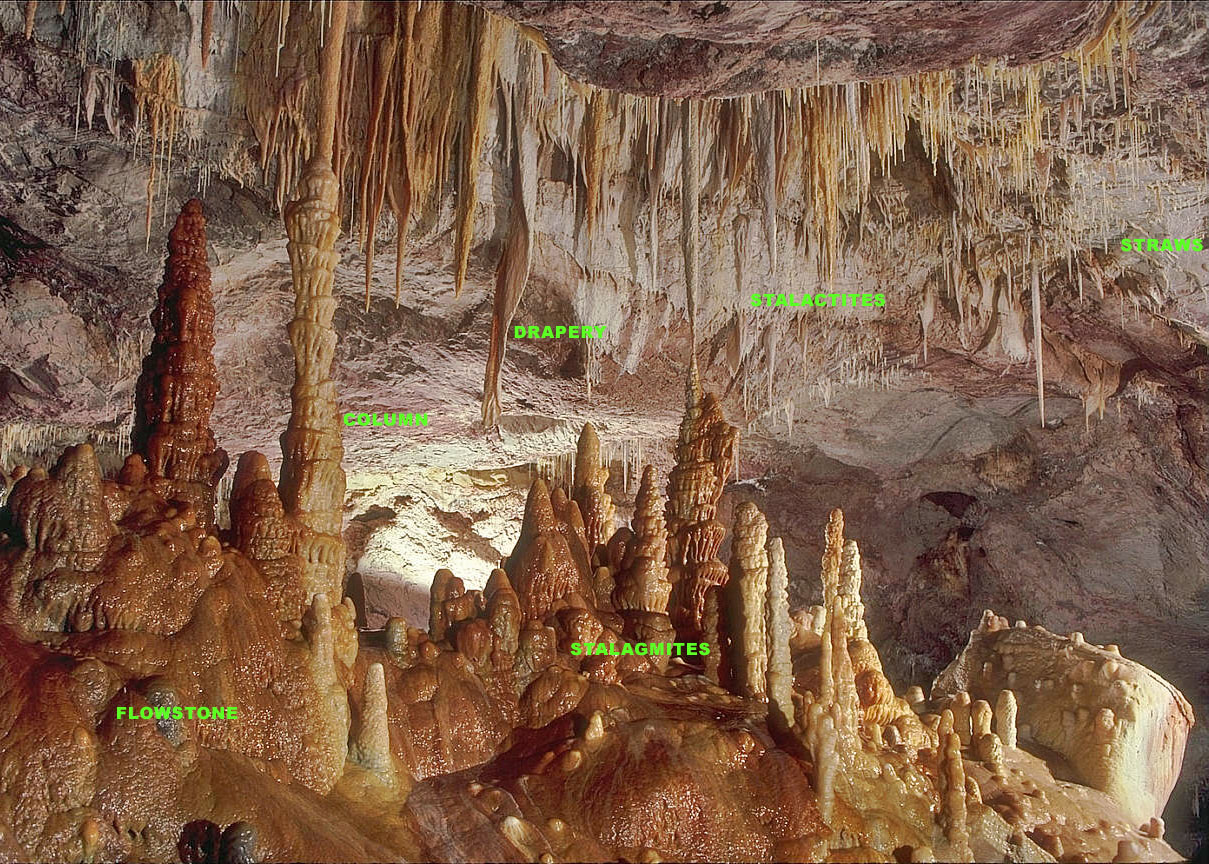
Cave labeled with the six most common types of speleothems: flowstone, columns, drapery, stalagmites, stalactites and straws

A speleothem (/ˈspiːliəθɛm/; from Ancient Greek σπήλαιον (spḗlaion) 'cave' and θέμα (théma) 'deposit') is a geological formation made by mineral deposits that accumulate over time in natural caves. They can take a variety of forms, depending on their depositional history and environment. Common forms include stalagmites, stalactites, and flowstones.

Speleothems most commonly form in calcareous caves due to carbonate dissolution reactions. Their chemical composition, gradual growth, and preservation in caves make them useful paleoclimatic proxies.

== Chemical and physical characteristics ==
More than 300 variations of cave mineral deposits have been identified. The vast majority of speleothems are calcareous, composed of calcium carbonate (CaCO_{3}) minerals (calcite or aragonite). Less commonly, speleothems are made of calcium sulfate (gypsum or mirabilite) or opal. Speleothems of pure calcium carbonate or calcium sulfate are translucent and colorless. The presence of iron oxide or copper provides a reddish brown color. The presence of manganese oxide can create darker colors such as black or dark brown. Speleothems can also be brown due to the presence of mud and silt.

Many factors impact the shape and color of speleothems, including the chemical composition of the rock and water, water seepage rate, water flow direction, cave temperature, cave humidity, air currents, aboveground climate, and aboveground plant cover. Weaker flows and short travel distances form narrower stalagmites, while heavier flow and a greater fall distance tend to form broader ones.

== Formation processes ==
Most cave chemistry involves calcium carbonate (CaCO_{3}) containing rocks such as limestone or dolomite, composed of calcite or aragonite minerals. Carbonate minerals are more soluble in the presence of higher carbon dioxide (CO_{2}) and lower temperatures. Calcareous speleothems form via carbonate dissolution reactions whereby rainwater reacts with soil CO_{2} to create weakly acidic water via the reaction:

H_{2}O + CO_{2} → H_{2}CO_{3}

As the acidic water travels through the calcium carbonate bedrock from the surface to the cave ceiling, it dissolves the bedrock via the reaction:

CaCO_{3} + H_{2}CO_{3} → Ca^{2+} + 2 HCO_{3}^{−}

When the solution reaches a cave, the lower pCO_{2} in the cave drives the precipitation of CaCO_{3} via the reaction:

Ca^{2+} + 2 HCO_{3}^{−} → CaCO_{3} + H_{2}O + CO_{2}

Over time, the accumulation of these precipitates form dripstones (stalagmites, stalactites), and flowstones, two of the major types of speleothems.

== Climate proxies ==
Speleothem transects can provide paleoclimate records similar to those from ice cores or tree rings. Slow geometrical growth and incorporation of radioactive elements enables speleothems to be accurately and precisely dated over much of the late Quaternary by radiocarbon dating and uranium-thorium dating, as long as the cave is a closed system and the speleothem has not undergone recrystallization. Oxygen (δ^{18}O) and carbon (δ^{13}C) stable isotopes are used to track variation in rainfall temperature, precipitation, and vegetation changes over the past ~500,000 years. The Mg/Ca proxy has likewise been used as a moisture indicator, although its reliability as a palaeohygrometer can be affected by cave ventilation during dry seasons. Variations in precipitation alter the width of speleothem rings: close rings indicates little rainfall, wider spacing indicates heavier rainfall, and denser rings indicate higher moisture. Drip rate counting and trace element analysis of the water drops record short-term climate variations, such as El Niño–Southern Oscillation (ENSO) climate events. Exceptionally, climate proxy data from the early Permian period have been retrieved from speleothems dated to 289 million years ago sourced from infilled caves exposed by quarrying at the Richards Spur locality in Oklahoma.

== Types and categories ==
Types of speleothem: (A) Stalactite (B) Soda straws (C) Stalagmites (D) Coned stalagmite (E) Stalagnate or column (F) Drapery (G) Drapery (H) Helictites (I) Moonmilk (J) Sinter pool, rimstone (K) Calcite crystals (L) Sinter terrace (M) Karst (N) Body of water (O) Shield (P) Cave clouds (Q) Cave pearls (R) Tower cones (S) Shelfstones (T) Baldacchino canopy (U) Bottlebrush stalactite (V) Conulite (W) Flowstone (X) Trays (Y) Calcite rafts (Z) Cave popcorn or coralloids (AA) Frostworks (AB) Flowstone (AC) Splattermite (AD) Speleoseismites (AE) Boxworks (AF) Oriented stalactite (AG) collapsed rubble (AH) popcorn

Speleothems take various forms, depending on whether the water drips, seeps, condenses, flows, or ponds. Many speleothems are named for their resemblance to man-made or natural objects. Types of speleothems include:

- Dripstone is calcium carbonate in the form of stalactites or stalagmites
  - Stalactites are pointed pendants hanging from the cave ceiling, from which they grow
    - Soda straws are very thin but long stalactites with an elongated cylindrical shape rather than the usual more conical shape of stalactites
  - Stalagmites are the "bottom-up" counterparts of stalactites, often blunt mounds
    - Broomstick stalagmites are tall and maintain a near constant diameter throughout their length
    - Totem pole stalagmites are also tall and shaped like their namesakes
    - Fried egg stalagmites are small, typically wider than they are tall
    - Stalagnate results when stalactites and stalagmites meet or when stalactites reach the floor of the cave
  - Conulites also called 'Mud cups', are ice cream cone-shaped formations that form when water drips into soft sediment
  - Cave Rings form when drops splash off a stalagmite and land around it, creating a nearly perfect ring
- Helictites grow from hydrostatic pressure forcing water through pores in both the bedrock and a cave crust. This pattern deposits calcite at its edge, maintaining a central capillary canal allowing it to grow from the ceiling, walls, or floor. Direction of growth is governed by surface tension or crystal structure rather than by gravity.
  - Include forms known as ribbon helictites, saws, rods, butterflies, hands, curly-fries, and "clumps of worms"
    - Chandeliers are complex clusters of ceiling decorations
    - Ribbon stalactites, or simply "ribbons", are shaped accordingly
- Flowstone is sheet like and found on cave floors and walls
  - Cave Draperies or curtains are thin, wavy sheets of calcite hanging downward, often ending in a stalactite.
    - Bacon is a drapery with variously colored bands within the sheet
  - Rimstone dams, or gours, form on irregular flowstone slopes or where water overflows the edges of pools
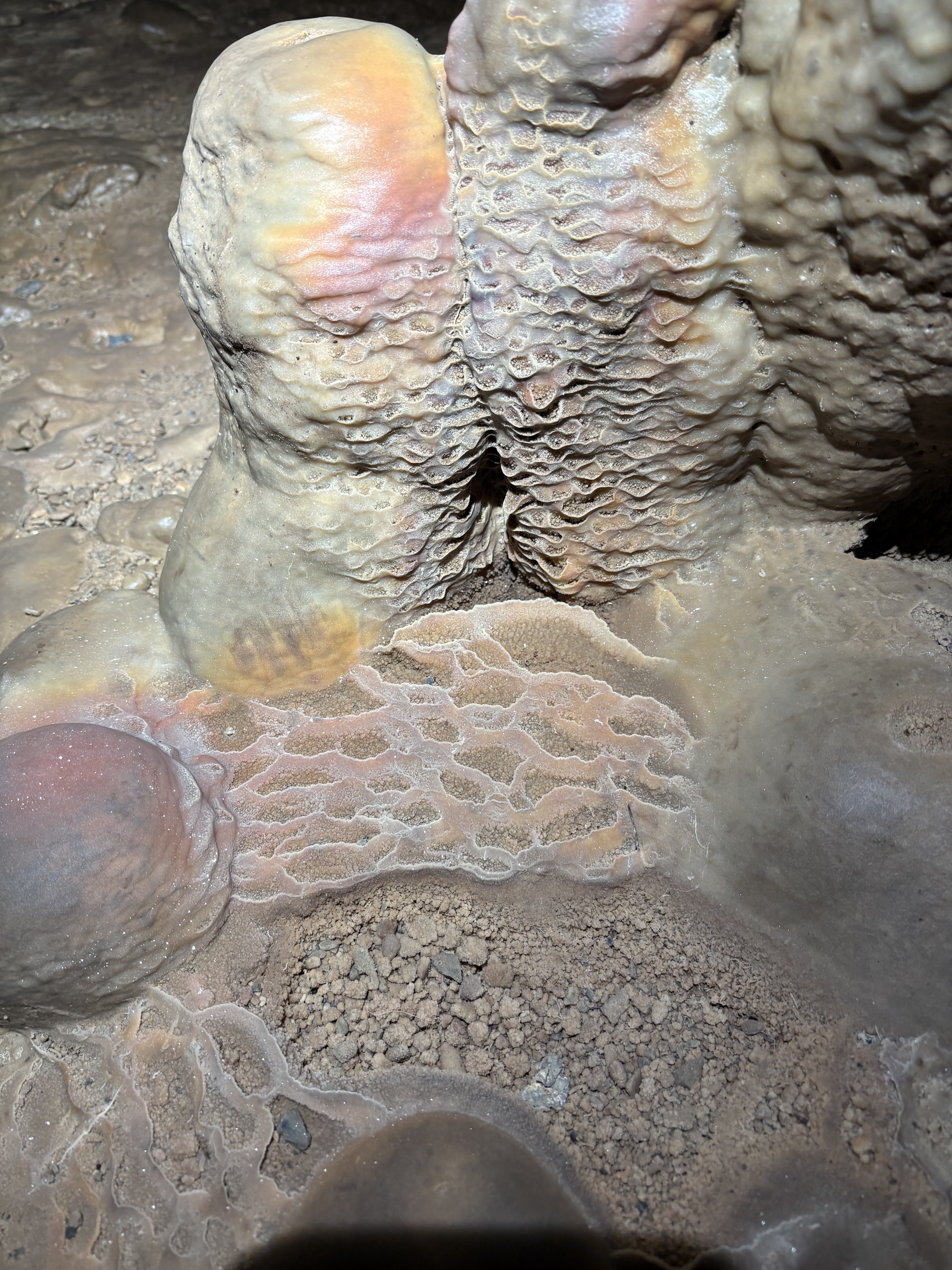
    Rimstone with odd color, in Bristol Caverns, TN
  - Cave Cups grow in supersaturated pools from the tip up
  - Cave Hoods are formed when a mineral is precipitated out of solution, covering any substrate, when that substrate is eroded or dissolved away, a cave hood is left behind. This happens mainly with calcite and sulfate minerals.
- Miscellaneous Formations all formations that do not fit nicely into other categories.
  - Cave shields are flat, rounded formations that grow at all angles depending on the bedrock. They grow from a medial capillary crack. They can have stalagmites growing from the bottom
  - Cave Folia grow when a fluctuating pool leaves calcite (or mud) on a ceiling or wall; the continued fluctuation allows for more growth.
  - Cave Caps are small formations often found covering pebbles in a cave.
  - Cave Coatings cover walls in thin calcite deposits and allow for the formation of other speleothems
    - Cave Blisters look like small white bubbles on the coating of cave walls
  - Cave Crusts mainly cover the floors of caves and often contain magnesium and manganese
  - Geysernites form in the same way geysers form, from hydrothermal waters
  - Pool Fingers are finger-like formations that form in pools of water
  - Crystal spars are large crystal formations where individual crystals can be seen by the naked eye. They are often found near or in cave pools
    - Dogtooth spars are a type of spar consisting of calcite
  - Frostwork consists of flower-like clusters of anthodites, needle-like (acicular) growths of aragonite
  - Moonmilk is white and when wet has the texture of cream cheese, when dry it is powdery
    - Cave Balloons form when gas or liquid comes out of the wall behind wet moonmilk deposits
  - Cryogenic calcite crystals are loose grains of calcite found on the floors of caves formed by segregation of solutes during freezing of water.
  - Cave popcorn, also known as "coralloids" or "cave coral", are small, knobby clusters of calcite
  - Cave pearls form when water drips from high above, agitating a pool so that small particles are turned over and become coated on all sides with calcium carbonate, sometimes creating near-perfect spheres
  - Snottites are colonies of predominantly sulfur oxidizing bacteria and have the consistency of "snot", or mucus
  - Calcite rafts are thin accumulations of calcite that appear on the surface of cave pools
    - Cave Cones grow when water drops into a pool in one place and 'kills' Calcite Rafts, forcing them to settle on the bottom of the pool
  - Hells Bells, a particular speleothem found in the El Zapote cenote of Yucatan in the form of submerged, bell-like shapes
  - Lava tubes contain speleothems composed of sulfates, mirabilite or opal. When the lava cools, precipitation occurs.
- Speleogens (technically distinct from speleothems) are formations within caves that are created by the removal of bedrock, rather than as secondary deposits. These include:
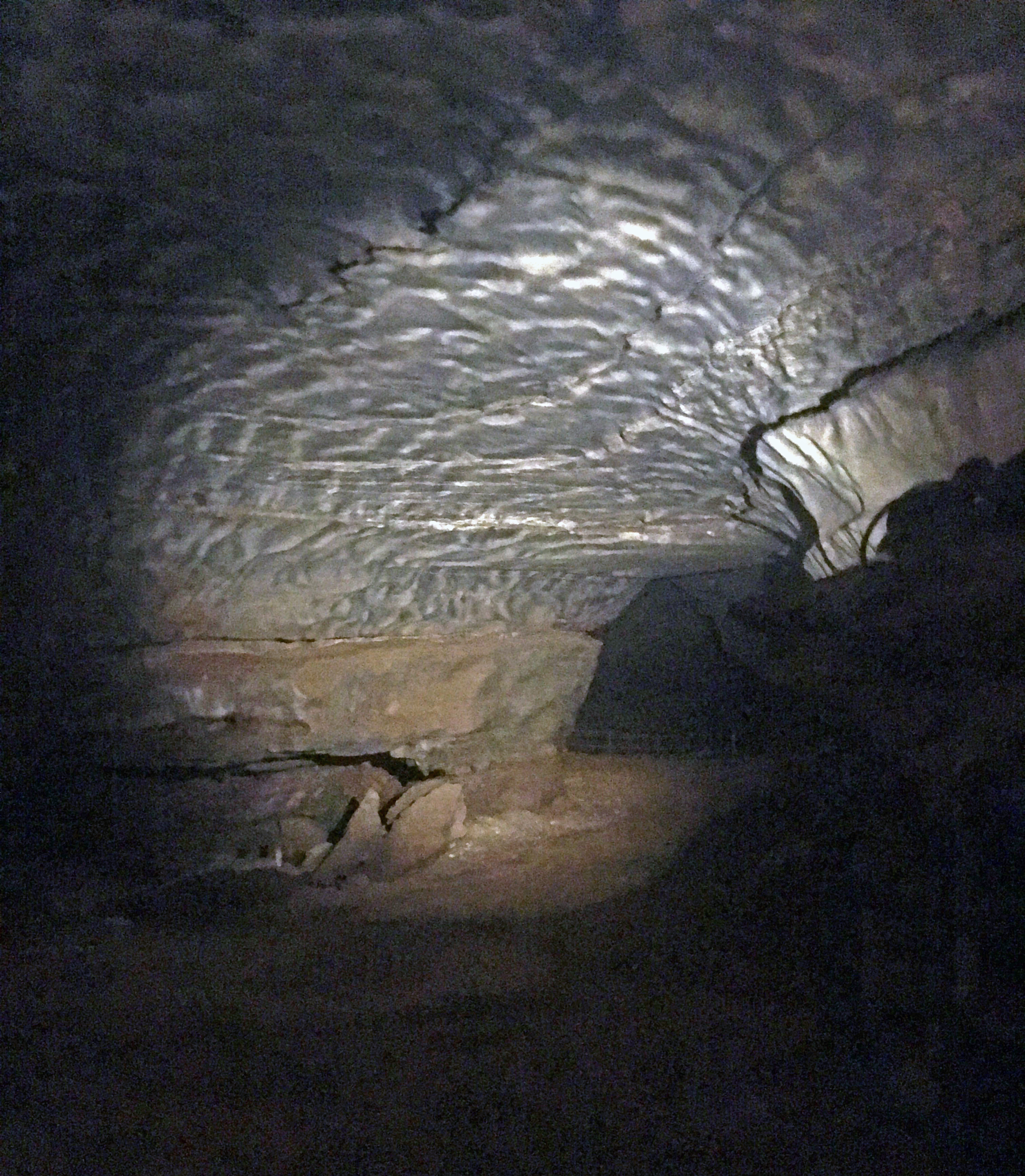
  Scallops in Mammoth Cave
  - pendants
  - Pinnacles
  - Scallops
  - Boneyard
  - Boxwork

== Calthemites ==
The usual definition of speleothem excludes secondary mineral deposits derived from concrete, lime, mortar, or other calcareous material (e.g. limestone and dolomite) outside the cave environment or in artificial caves (e.g. mines, tunnels), which can have similar shapes and forms as speleothems. Such secondary deposits in man-made structures are termed calthemites. Calthemites are often associated with concrete degradation, or due to leaching of lime, mortar, or other calcareous material.

== Gallery ==
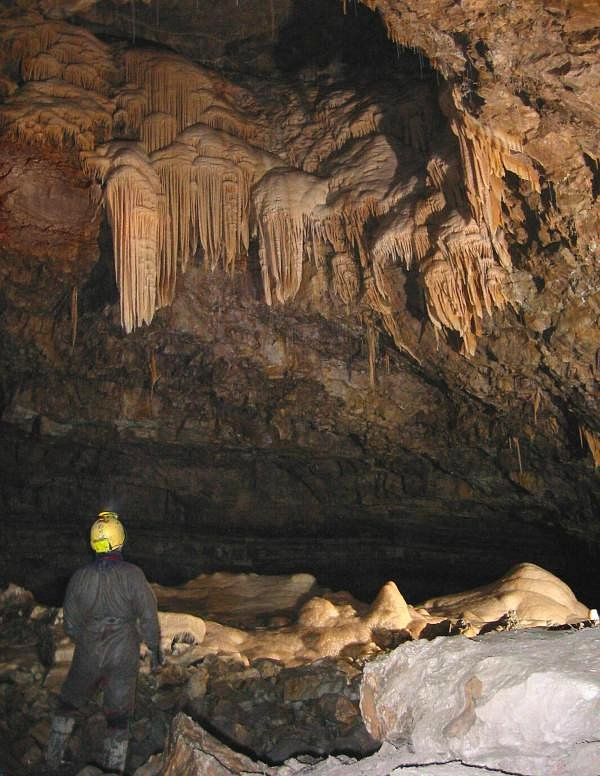
Various formations in the Hall of the Mountain Kings, Ogof Craig a Ffynnon, South Wales, Great Britain

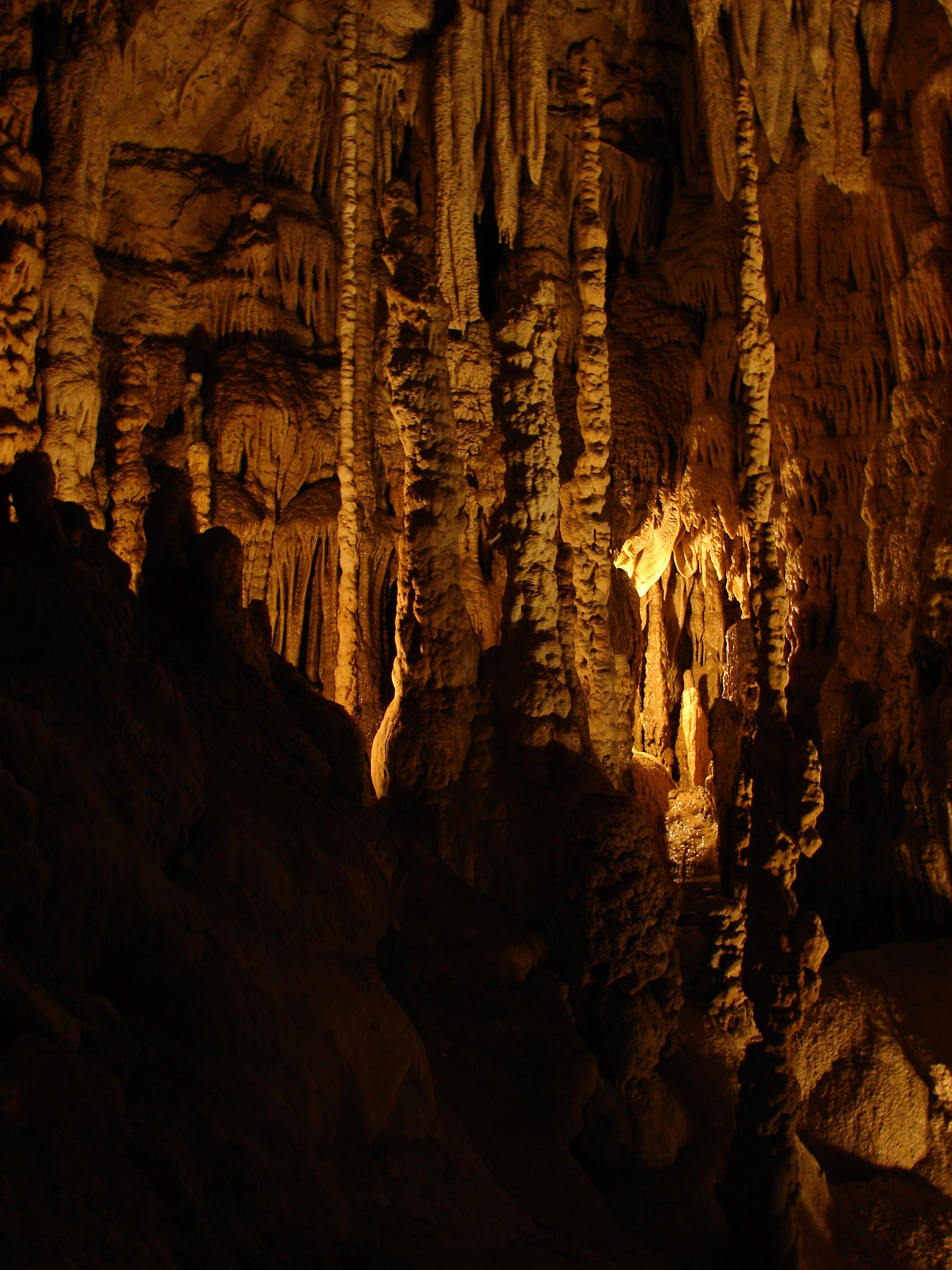
Stalactites and columns in Natural Bridge Caverns, Texas

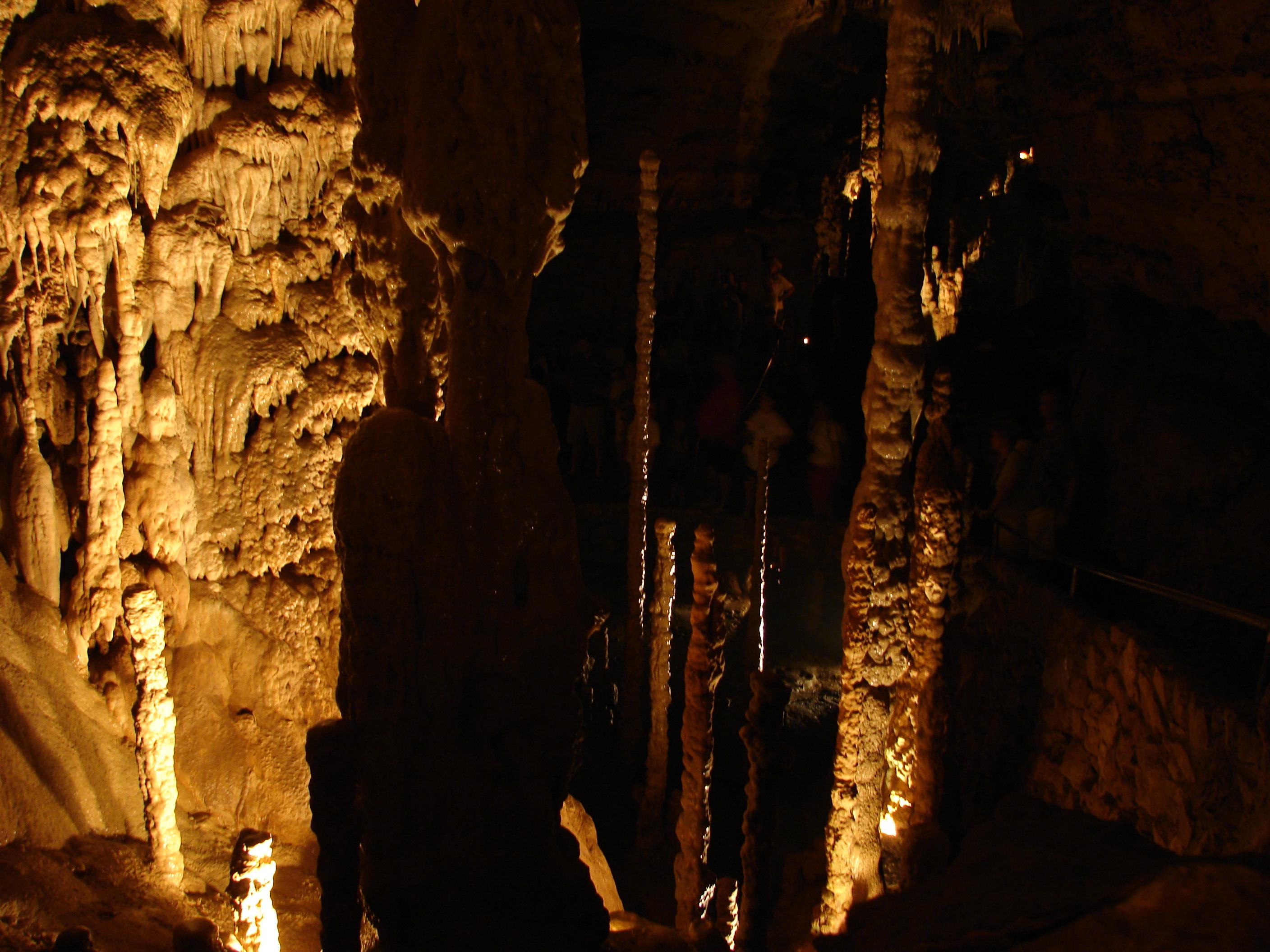
More formations in Natural Bridge Caverns, Texas

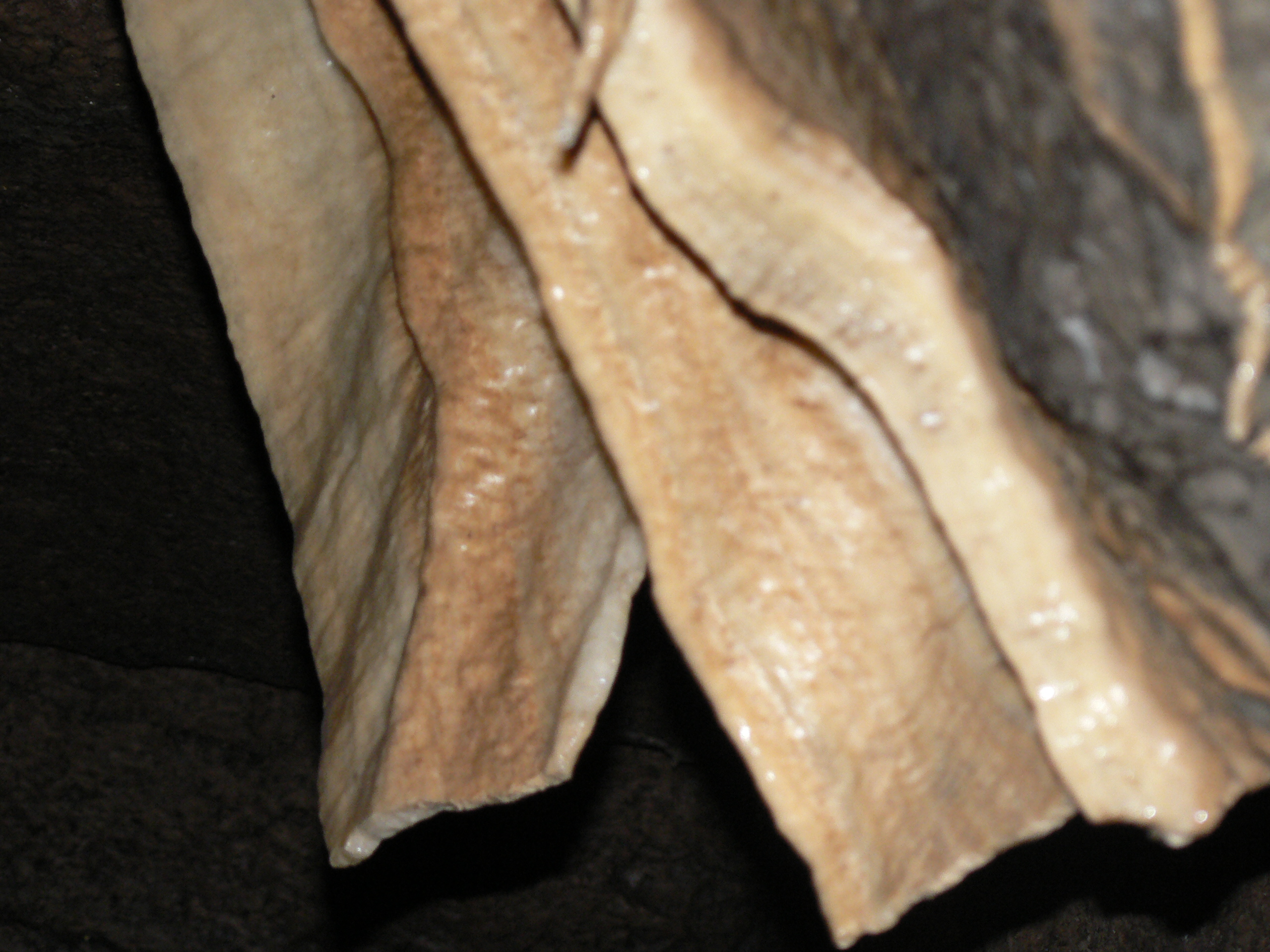
Cave curtain formation in the Marble Arch Caves, County Fermanagh, Northern Ireland

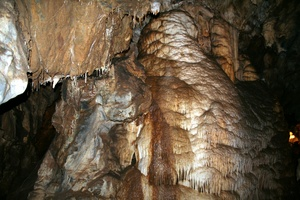
California Caverns, Calaveras County, California; one of many caverns located in the Sierra Foothills of California

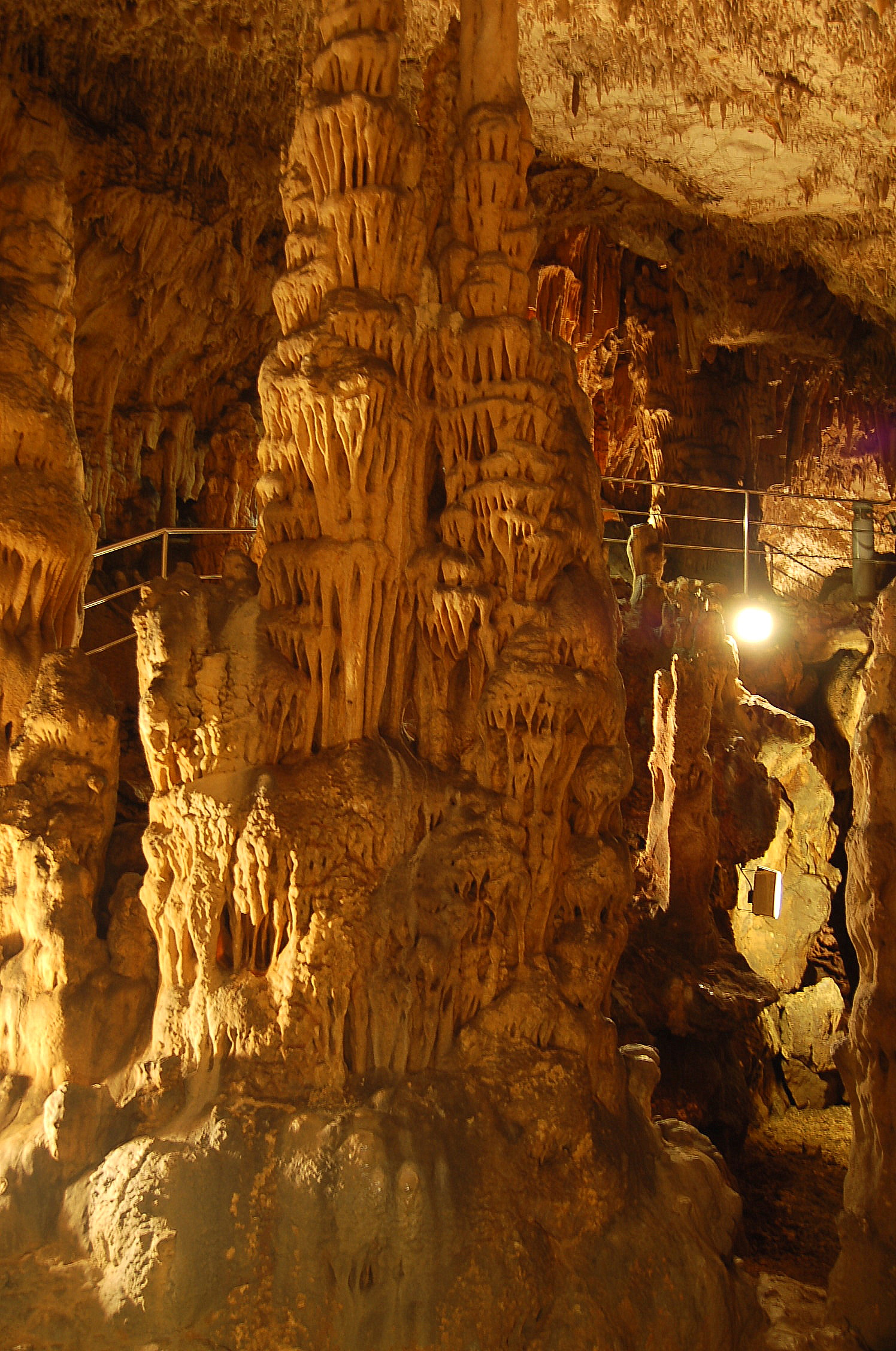
Stalagnates (columns) in the cave Biserujka, Dobrinj, Island Krk, Croatia

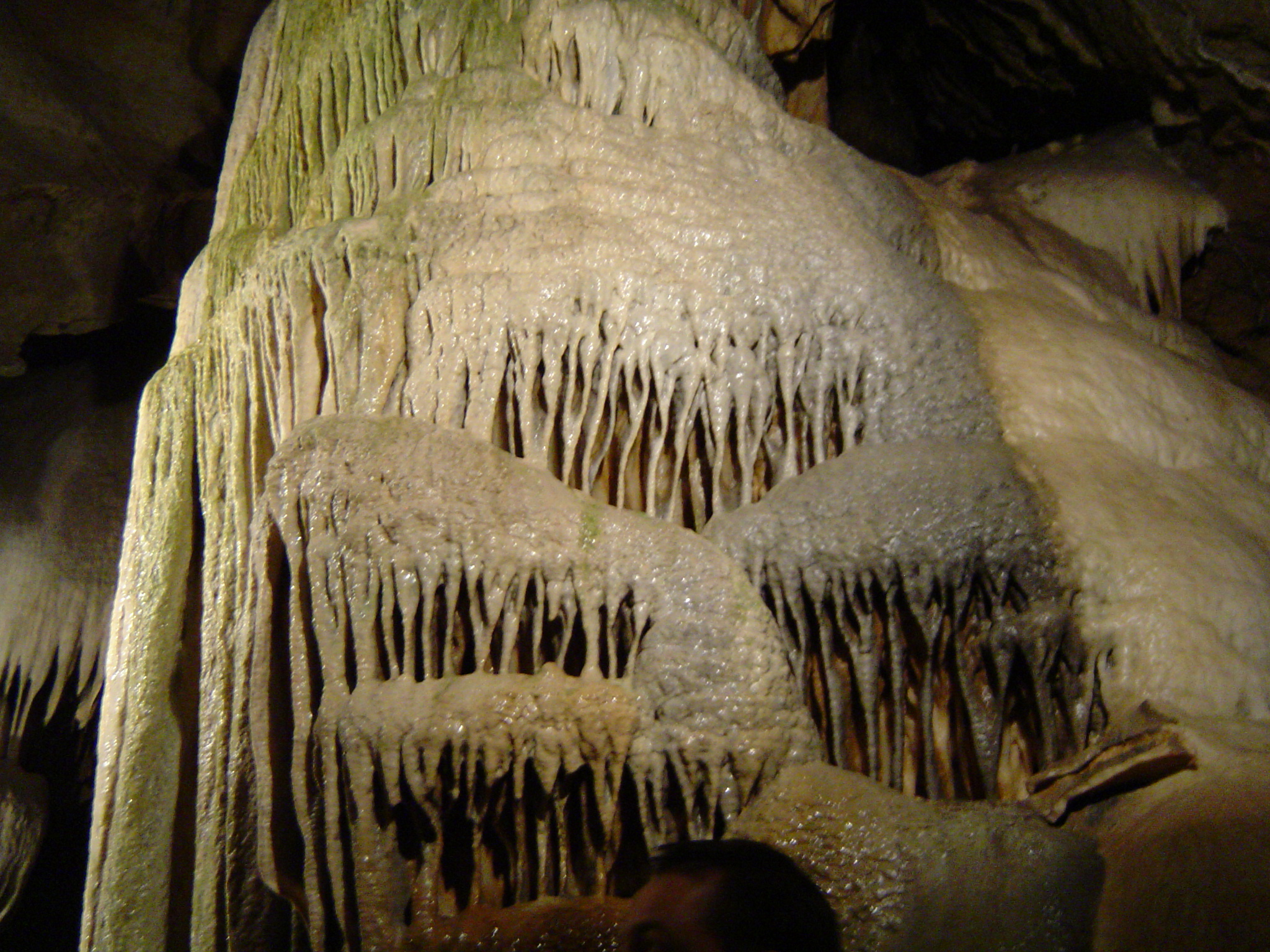
Various formations in the cave of Remouchamps, Aywaille, Belgium

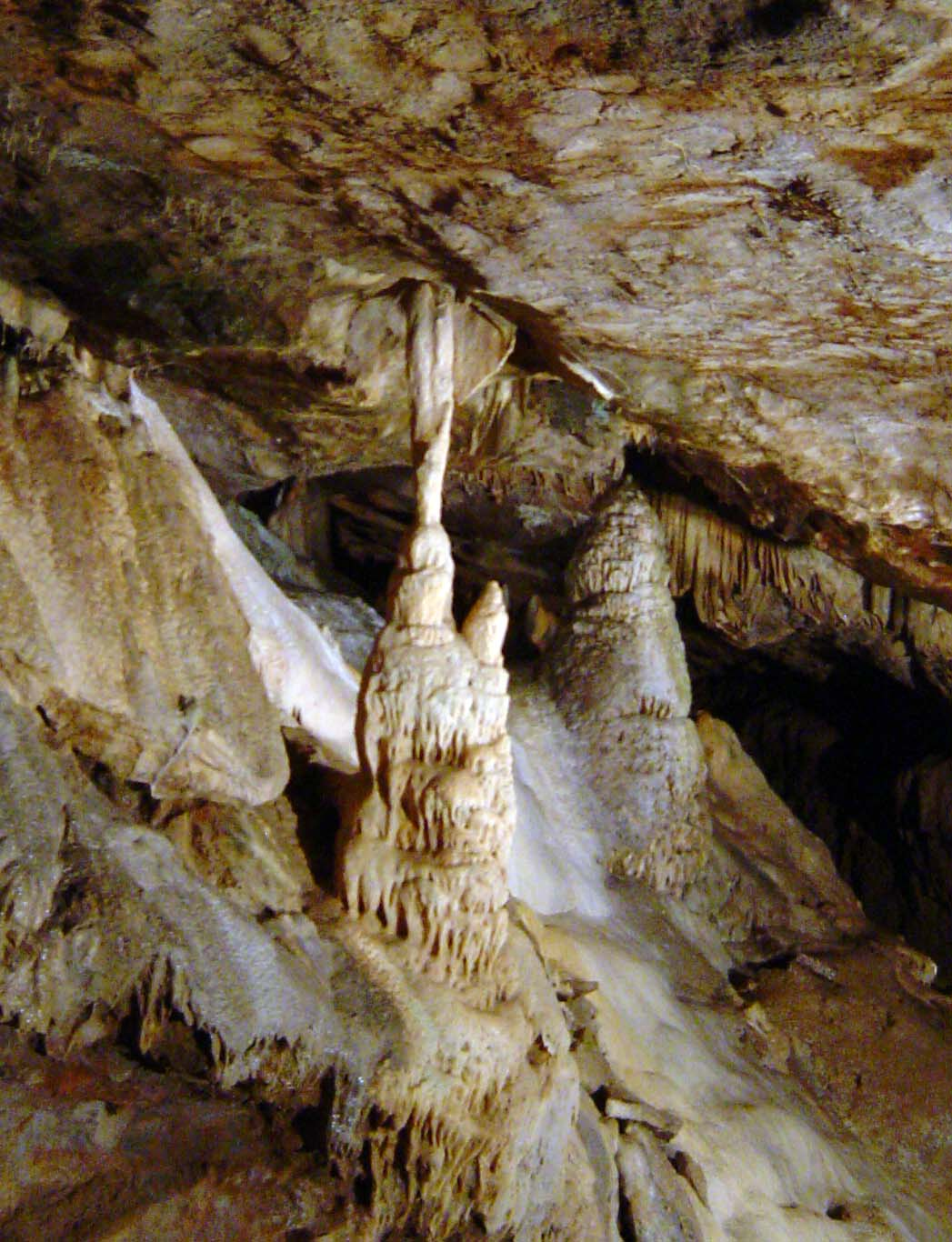
Stalagnate (column) in the cave of Remouchamps, Aywaille, Belgium

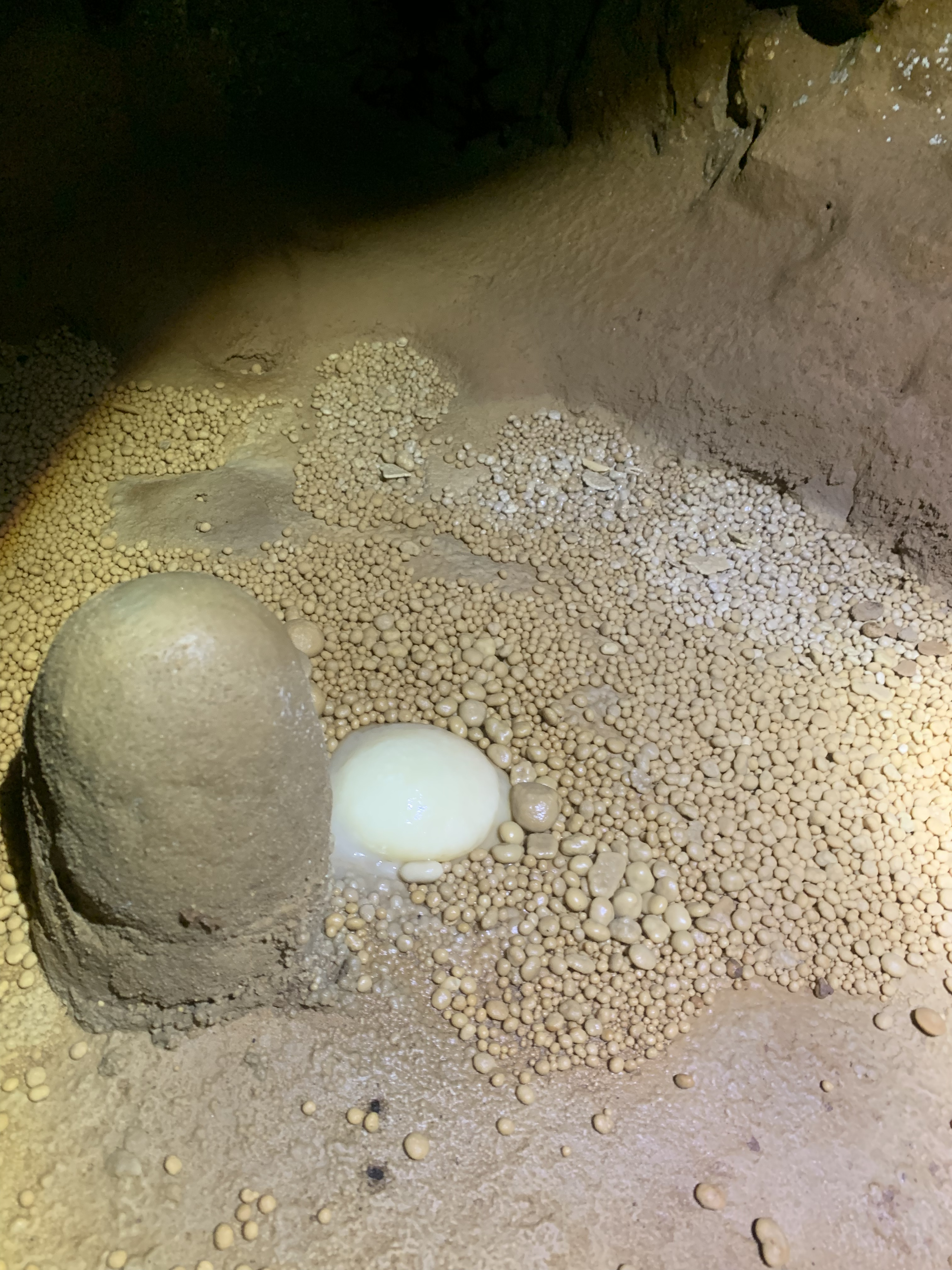
Image of Cave Pearl formation

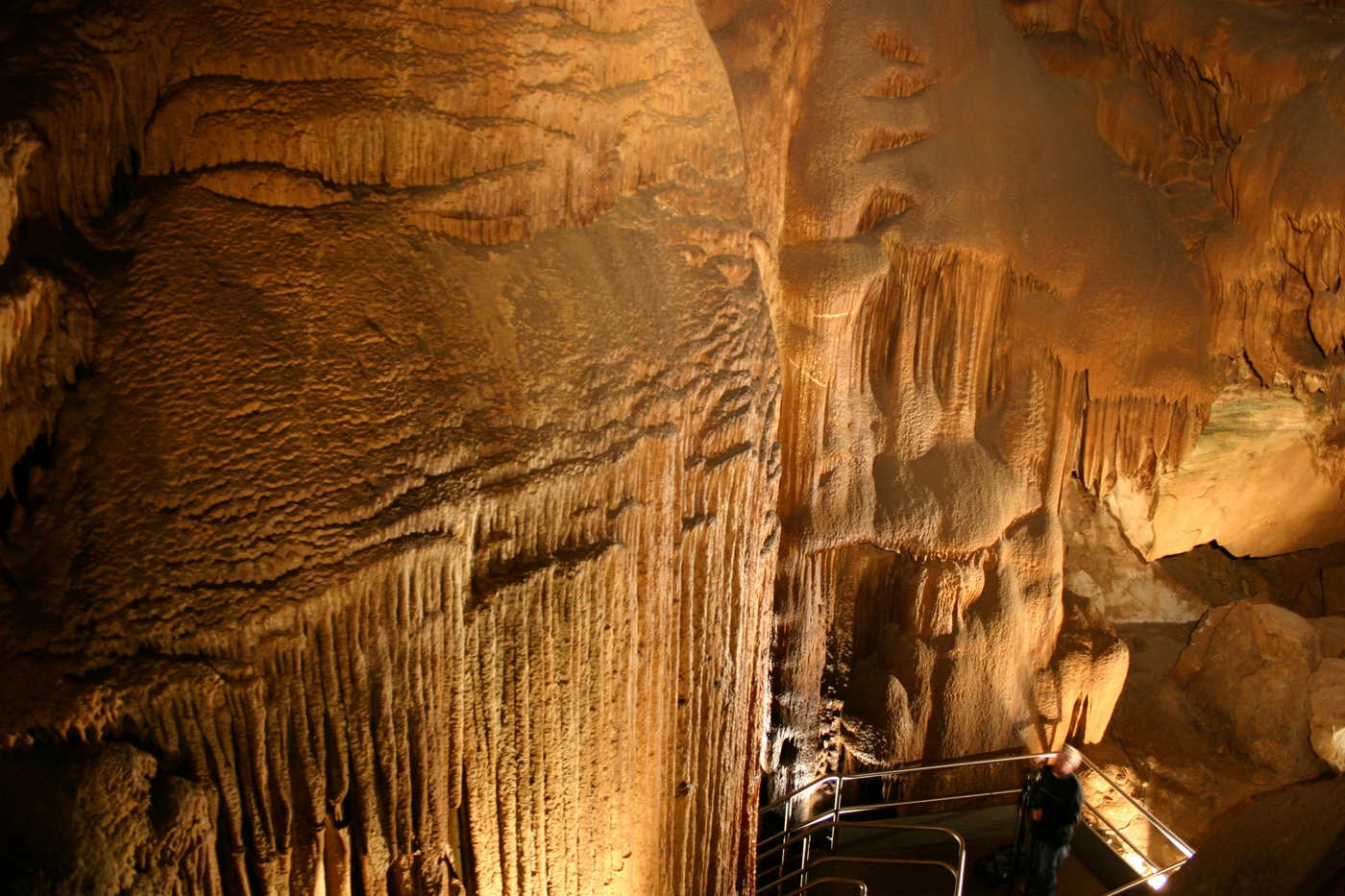
Image of flowstone in Mammoth Cave, KY

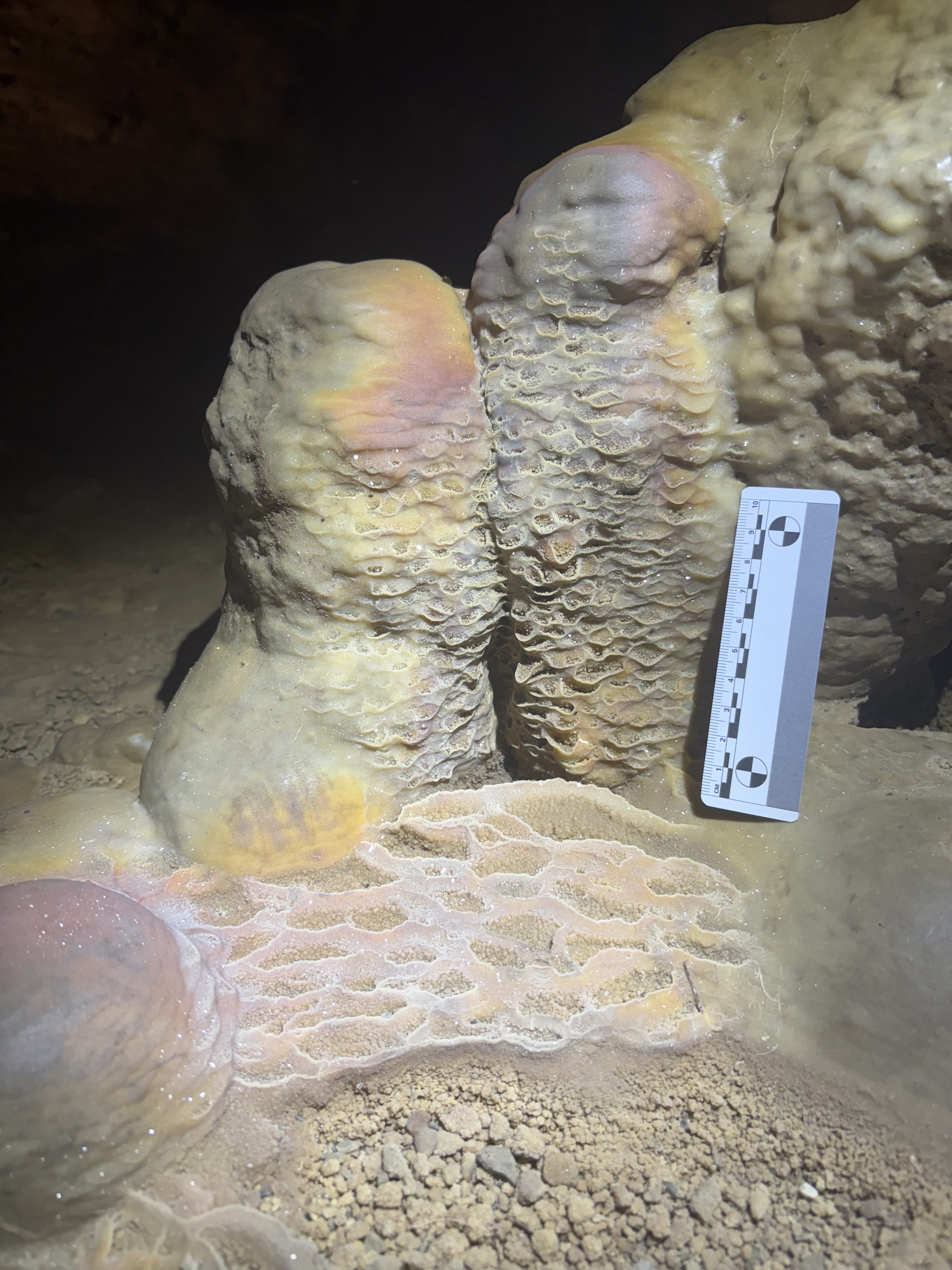
Rimstone with scale

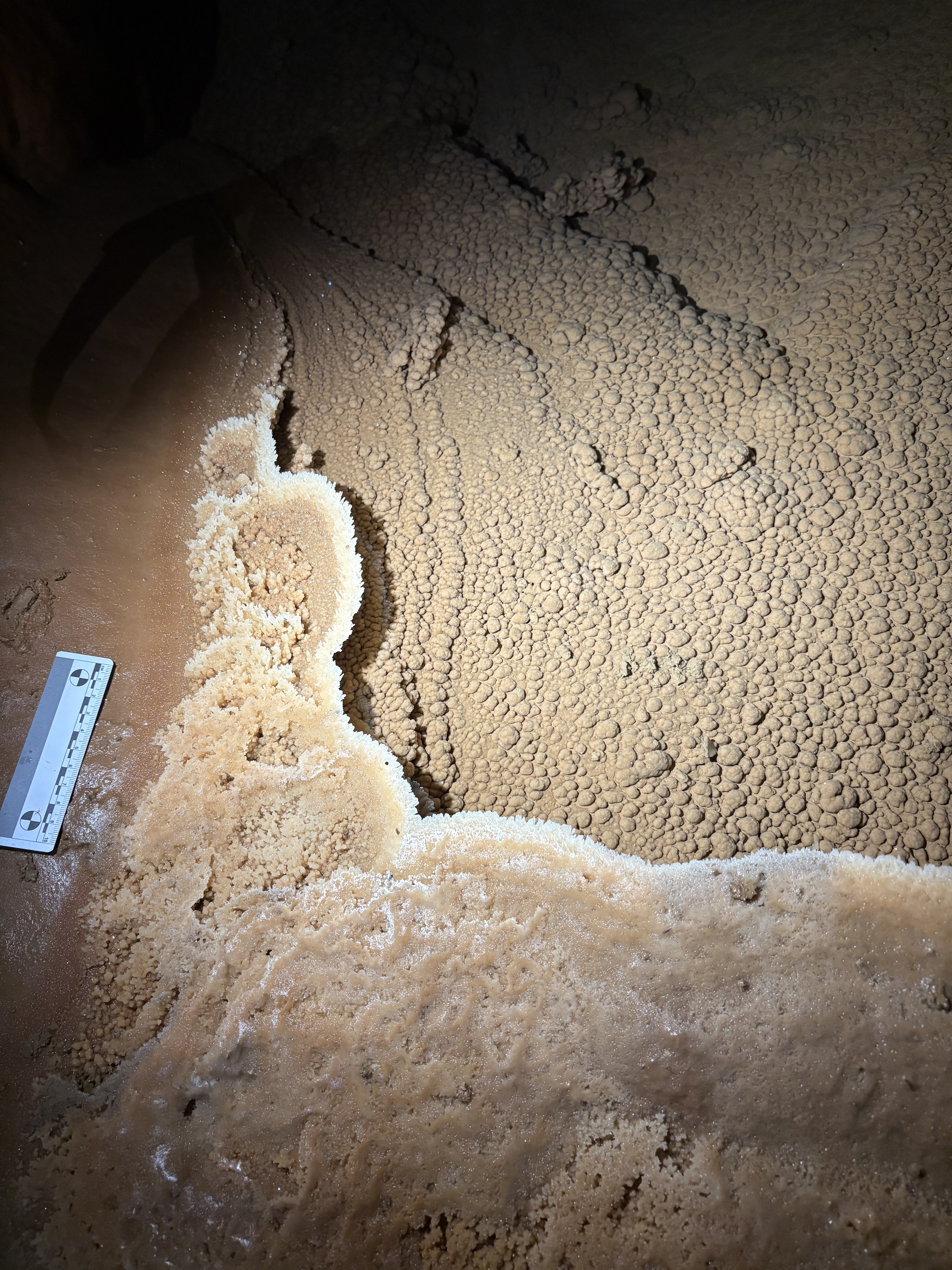
rimstone pool with subaques coralloids and aragonite

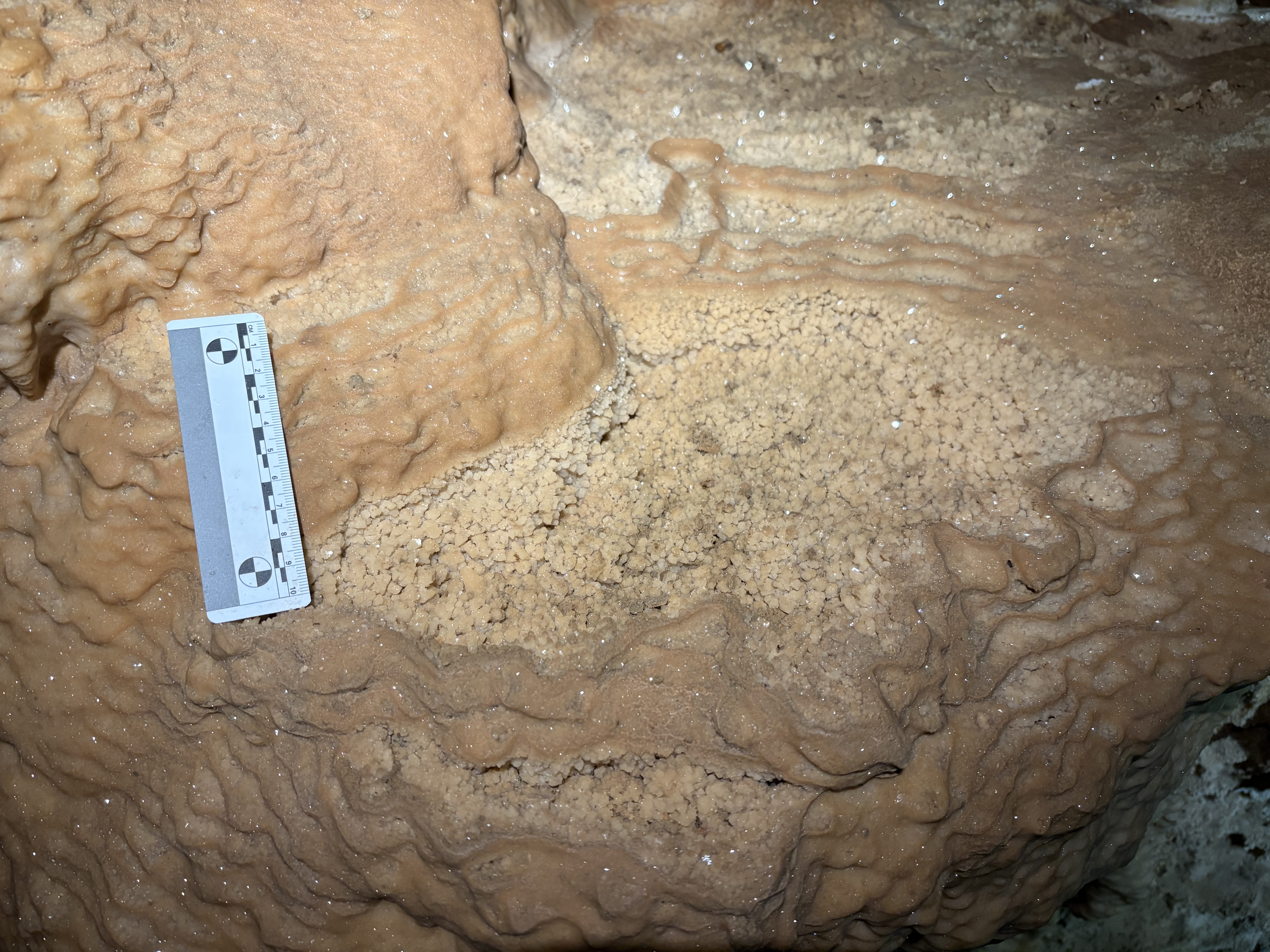
Pool spar with 10cm scale

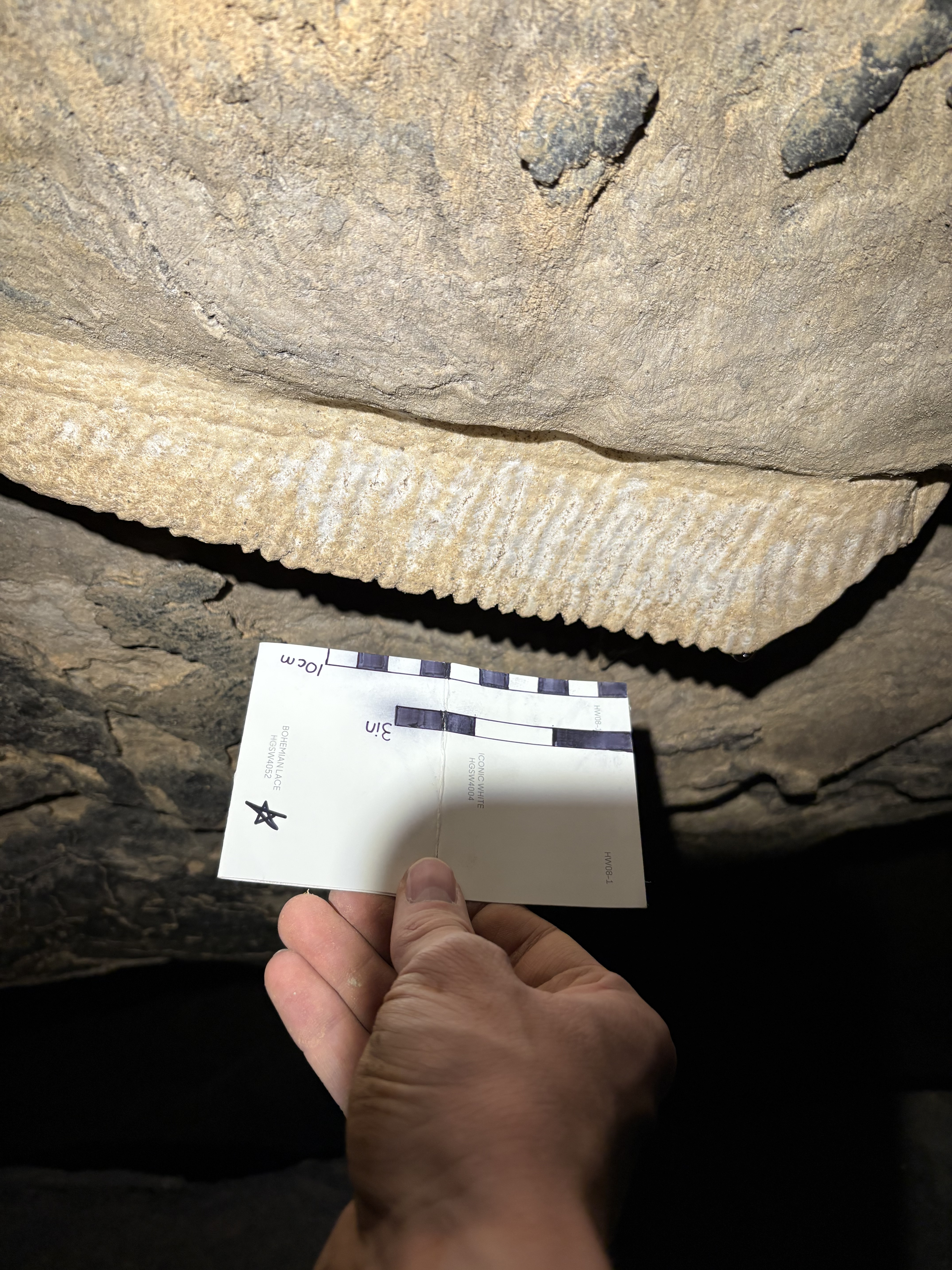
Cave Bacon with sawtooth pattern. (10cm scale)

== See also ==
- Petrifying well
