= Cave shield =

Cave formation

A cave shield is an oval or circular geological cave formation, made of two parallel plates or discs separated by a crack. They can grow at any angle in a cave and often have other formations growing on them. A cave shield will grow as two plates with a medial crack between them. This crack is almost never visible and is what allows the formation to grow through capillary action, drawing water to the edge of the plates and depositing calcite at the edge. Cave shields can grow at odd angles because they grow from the joints in the rocks that allow the water into the cave.

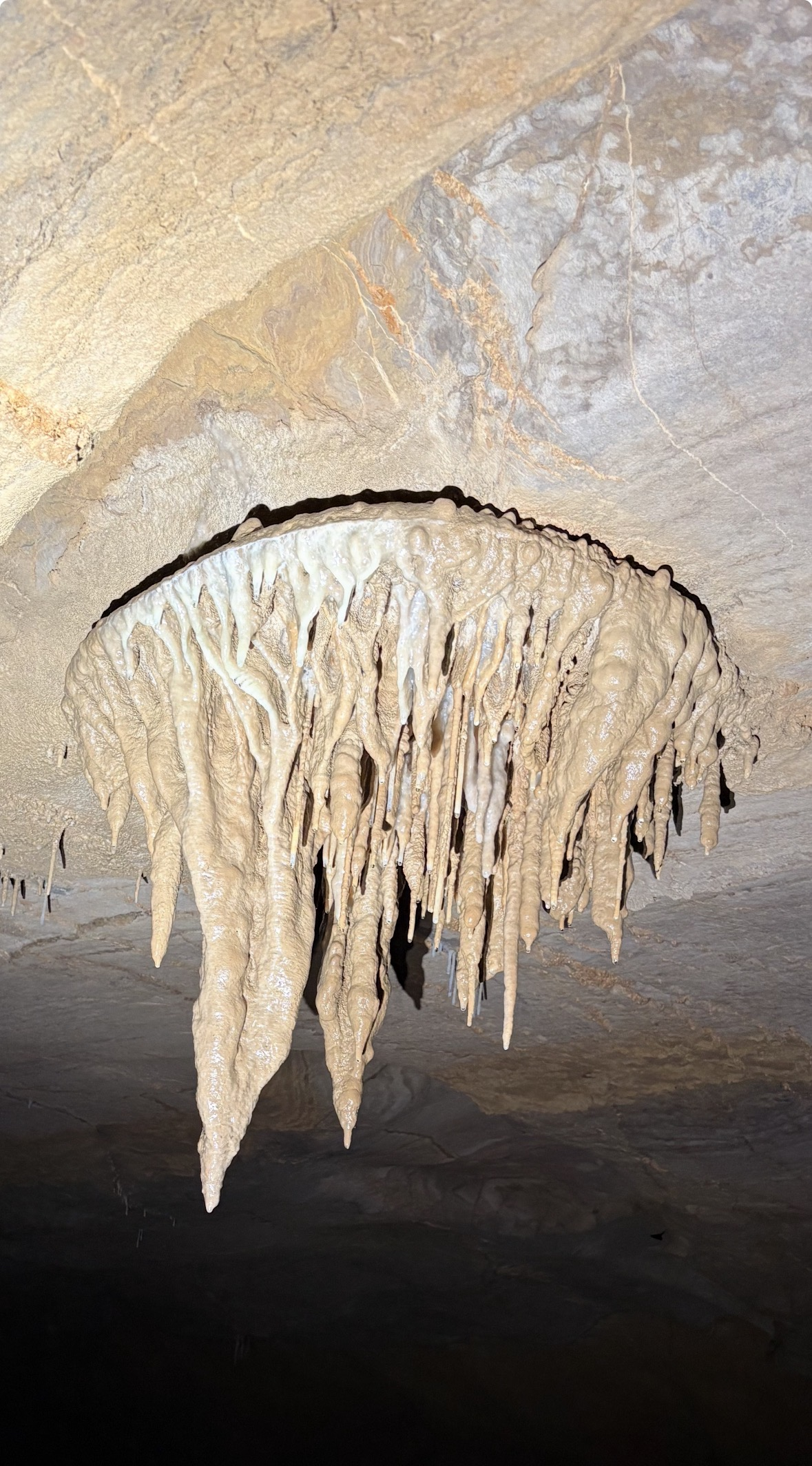
Cave Shield in Bristol Caverns

Because cave shields almost always have water and grow at varying angles, stalactites and flowstones will often grow from the bottom plate, creating parachute-like structures. The weight of the hanging formations will sometimes break the lower plate of a cave shield, revealing the inside of it. When this breakage occurs and the inside of the shield is rendered visible, growth rings made of calcite, aragonite, and travertine may be seen.

== Welts ==
Welts occur from fractures in bedrock, flowstones, or cave columns and grow as the fractures form in a similar enough manner to be classified as a subcategory of shields.
