= Dendron Swamp Natural Area Preserve =

Protected area in Virginia, United States

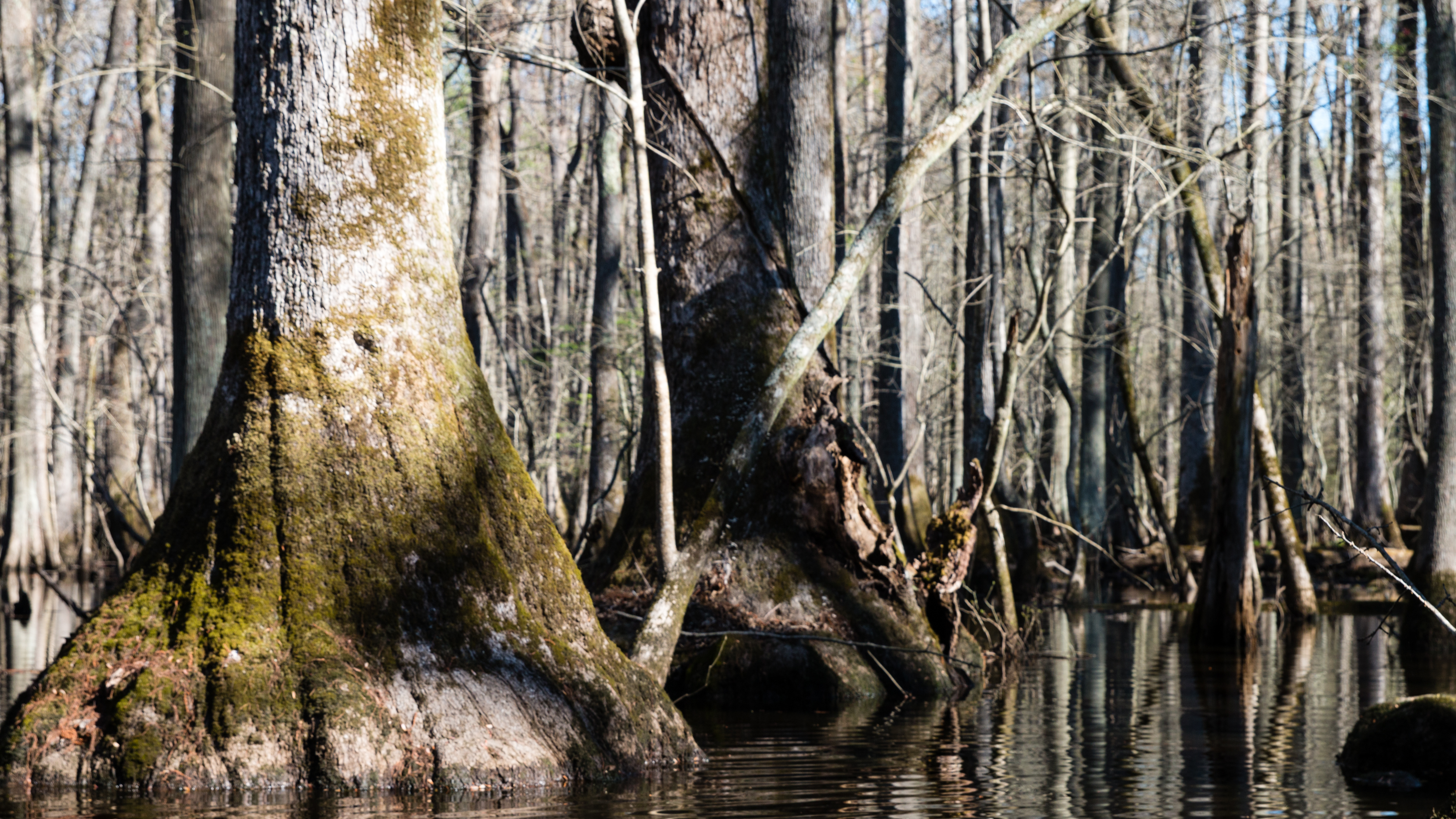
- Charles C. Steirly Natural Area, April 2017

- Location within Virginia
- Location: Sussex County, Virginia
- Coordinates: 37°03′03″N 76°58′52″W
- Area: 636 acres (257 ha)
- Governing body: Virginia Department of Conservation and Recreation

Dendron Swamp Natural Area Preserve is a 636-acre (257 ha) Natural Area Preserve in Sussex County, Virginia, USA. Located along the Blackwater River, the preserve supports a bald cypress and tupelo swamp. Canopy trees over 98 feet (30 m) tall line the river for two miles (3.2 km) and the swamp shows only occasional signs of logging. Some of the larger cypresses are believed to be over 600 years old. Within the preserve is a nesting site for the great blue heron.

The preserve contains the Charles C. Steirly Natural Area, a 19-acre (7.7 ha) swamp containing an essentially virgin forest of bald cypress and water tupelo that was designated as a National Natural Landmark in 1974.

The preserve does not have facilities for public access and visitors must make arrangements with the Virginia Department of Conservation and Recreation before visiting.

== See also ==
- List of National Natural Landmarks in Virginia
- List of Virginia Natural Area Preserves
