= Piercys Mill, West Virginia =

- Unincorporated community
- Location within West Virginia Location within the United States
- Coordinates: 37°50′37″N 80°34′25″W
- Country: United States
- State: West Virginia
- County: Greenbrier
- Elevation: 1,660 ft (510 m)
- Time zone: UTC-5 (Eastern (EST))
  - Summer (DST): UTC-4 (EDT)
- Area codes: 304 & 681
- GNIS feature ID: 1555343

Piercys Mill is an unincorporated community in Greenbrier County, West Virginia, United States. Piercys Mill is 10.8 miles (17.4 km) north-northeast of Alderson.

Within the community is Piercy's Mill Cave, a privately owned cavern that extends just under a mile. A stream flows out of the cave's mouth and into Muddy Creek, a tributary of the Greenbrier River. A side passage inside of Piercy's Mill Cave leads to a series of rimstone dam rooms.
