= Calcite rafts =

Cave-crystallized calcite crusts

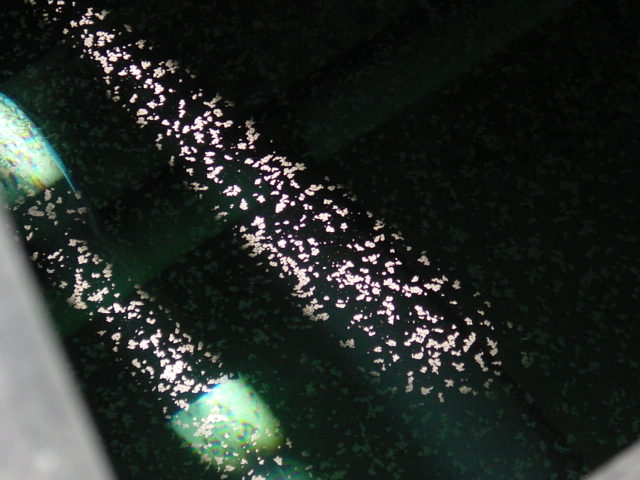
Calcite rafts on the surface of water in Carpinteria Reservoir

Calcite crystals form on the surface of quiescent bodies of water, even when the bulk water is not supersaturated with respect to calcium carbonate. The crystals grow, attach to one other and appear to be floating rafts of a white, opaque material. The floating materials have been referred to as calcite rafts or "leopard spots".

== Chemistry ==
Calcium carbonate is known to precipitate as calcite crystals in water supersaturated with calcium and carbonate ions. Under quiescent conditions, calcite crystals can form on a water surface when calcium carbonate supersaturation conditions do not exist in the bulk water. Water evaporates from the surface and carbon dioxide degasses from the surface layer to create a thin layer of water with high pH and concentrations of calcium and carbonate ions far above the saturation concentration for calcium carbonate. Calcite crystals precipitate in this highly localized environment and attach to one another to form what appear to be rafts of a white material.

Scanning electron micrographs of calcite rafts show interconnected calcite crystals formed around holes on the raft surface. The holes may be caused by air bubbles or other foreign matter on the water surface. Micrographs of calcite rafts show lace-like structure. The surface tension of the water keeps the interconnected calcite crystals, which individually have a specific gravity of 2.7, floating on the water surface.

== Cave and river system formation ==
Calcite rafts are most commonly formed in limestone cave systems. Limestone caves provide a favorable environment due to little air movement and water containing significant concentrations of calcium and carbonate ions. Evidence of calcite rafts has been found in limestone caves all over the world.

One example of calcite raft formation in a spring-fed river system has been reported.

== Drinking water reservoir ==
In 2005, the Carpinteria Valley Water District in Carpinteria, California, raised water quality concerns when "leopard spots" approximately 5 to 10 cm. in diameter appeared on the water surface under a newly constructed aluminum reservoir cover. The floating material had not been observed when the reservoir (13 million gallons) was open to the atmosphere. The concern raised was that a potentially toxic metallic precipitate was forming on the water surface from condensate dripping from the metal cover.

Water analyses found that the water in the reservoir was saturated with respect to calcium carbonate but no calcite crystals were formed in the bulk solution. X-ray diffraction analysis showed that the floating solid material was greater than 97 percent calcite. Scanning electron micrographs confirmed that the shape of the crystalline material was rhombohedral, which is consistent with calcite crystal formation.

While the floating material was not toxic, it was recommended that movement of the water surface be induced so that quiescent conditions would be avoided which would eliminate the primary condition for calcite raft formation.

== Concrete leachate drops ==
Micro calcite rafts have been observed on (soda) straw stalactites solution drops suspended beneath concrete structures. These secondary deposits which form outside the cave environment, are known as calthemites. They are derived from concrete, lime or mortar, and mimic the shapes and forms of speleothems created in caves.

The micro rafts which form on the surface of hyperalkaline leachate solution drips are typically about 0.5 mm in size when visible to the naked eye, and appear on the drip's surface after it has been suspended for greater than ≈5 minutes. The chemical reaction which creates the rafts, involves carbon dioxide (CO_{2}) being absorbed (diffusing) into solution from the atmosphere and calcium carbonate (CaCO_{3}) precipitates as rafts or deposited as a stalagmite, stalactite or flowstone. This chemistry is very different to that which creates speleothems in caves.

Internal water pulses from the straw (into the drop) and air movement around the suspended solution drop, can cause the rafts to spin swiftly around the drop surface. If there is almost no air movement around the suspended drop, then after approximately 12 minutes or more, the micro rafts may join up and form a latticework, which covers the entire drop surface. If the solution drop hangs too long on the straw (≈ >30 minutes), it may completely calcify over and block the calthemite straw tip.

== Gallery ==
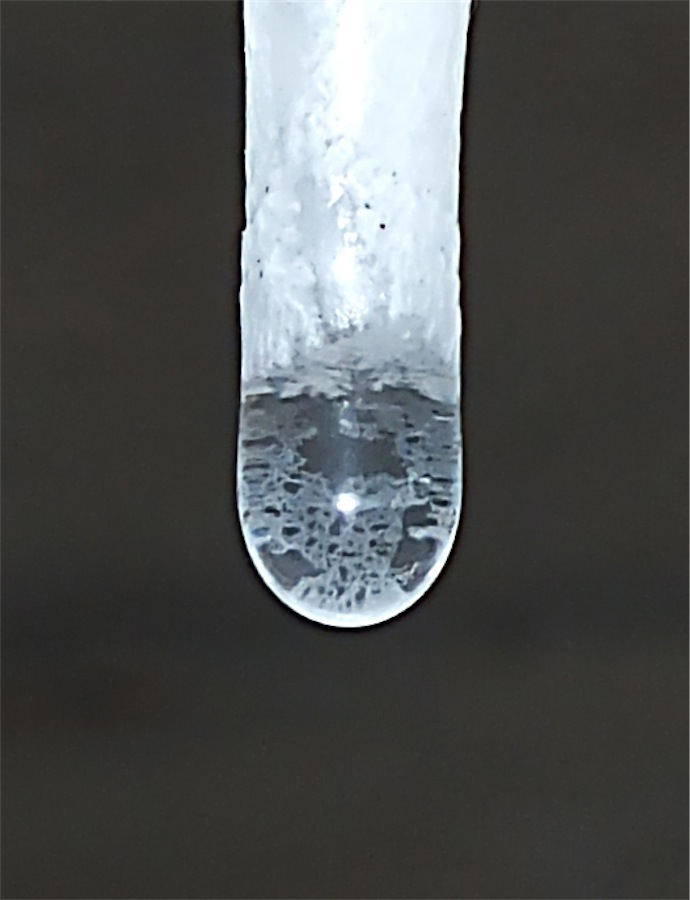
Lattice work or calcite rafts on a calthemite (soda) straw stalactite drop

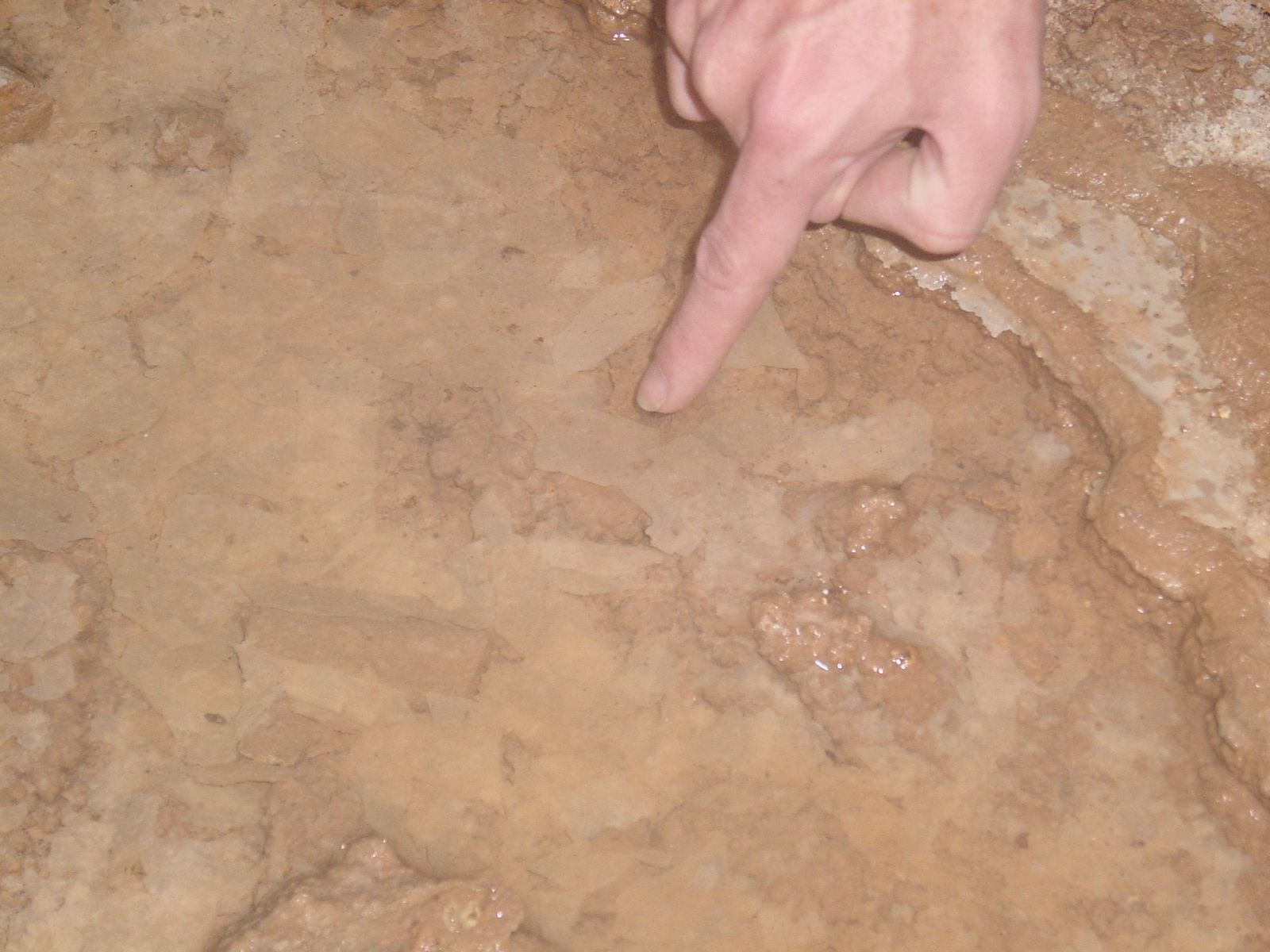
Calcite rafts in Kartchner Caverns, Arizona

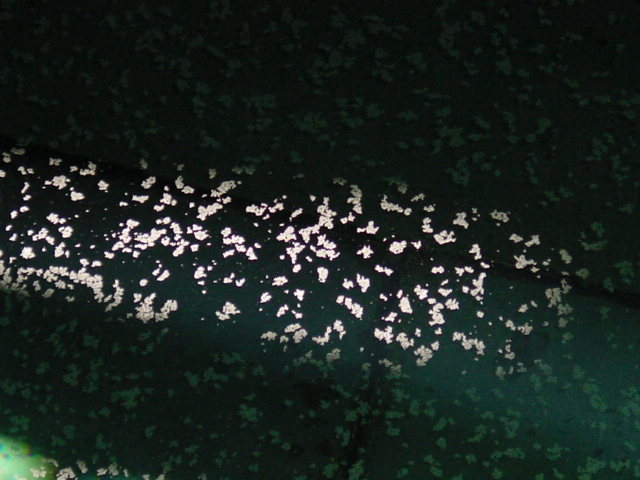
Detail of calcite rafts on the surface of water in Carpinteria Reservoir

Diagram of dripstone cave structures (calcite rafts labelled Y)

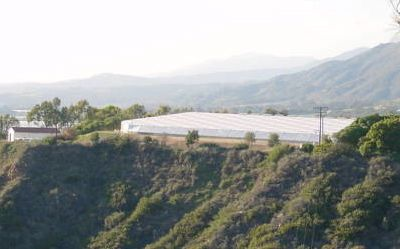
Carpinteria Reservoir with rigid aluminium cover

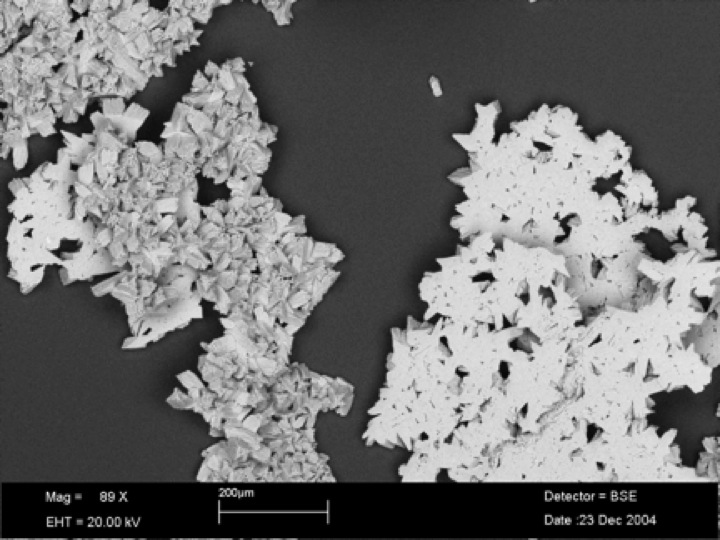
BSE-SEM image at 89 times magnification showing topsides of the calcite rafts (flat surfaces) and bottom crystals growing underneath
