= Calthemite =

Secondary calcium carbonate deposit growing under man-made structures

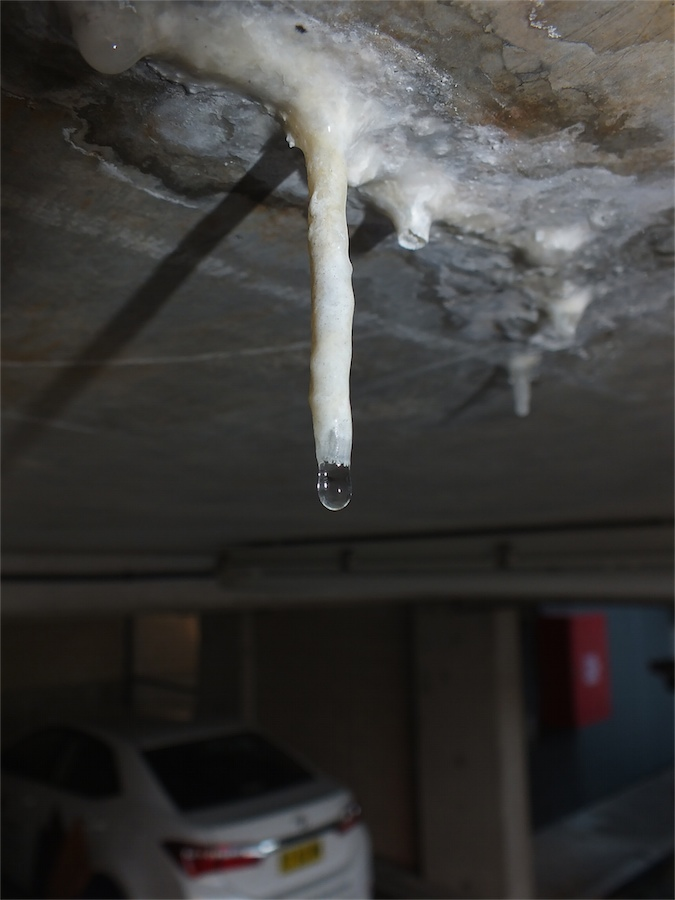
Calthemite straw stalactite growing from the concrete ceiling of an undercover car-park

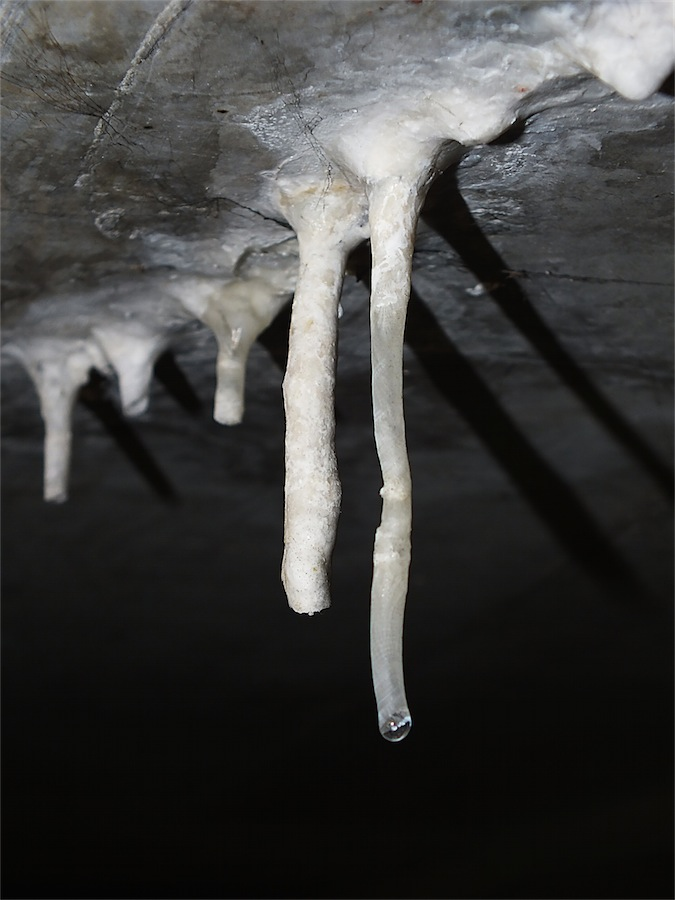
Calthemite straw stalactites, the rightmost example demonstrating bending due to the direction of air currents during its formation

Calthemite is a secondary deposit, derived from concrete, lime, mortar or other calcareous material outside the cave environment. Calthemites grow on or under man-made structures and mimic the shapes and forms of cave speleothems, such as stalactites, stalagmites, flowstone etc. Calthemite is derived from the Latin calx (genitive calcis) "lime" + Latin < Greek théma, "deposit" meaning ‘something laid down’, (also Mediaeval Latin thema, "deposit") and the Latin –ita < Greek -itēs – used as a suffix indicating a mineral or rock. The term "speleothem", due to its definition (spēlaion "cave" + théma "deposit" in ancient Greek) can only be used to describe secondary deposits in caves and does not include secondary deposits outside the cave environment.

== Origin and composition ==
Degrading concrete has been the focus of many studies and the most obvious sign is calcium-rich leachate seeping from a concrete structure.

Calthemite stalactites can form on concrete structures and "artificial caves" lined with concrete (e.g. mines and tunnels) significantly faster than those in limestone, marble or dolomite caves. This is because the majority of calthemites are created by chemical reactions which are different from normal "speleothem" chemistry.

Calthemites are usually the result of hyperalkaline solution (pH 9–14) seeping through a calcareous man-made structure until it comes into contact with the atmosphere on the underside of the structure, where carbon dioxide (CO_{2}) from the surrounding air facilitates the reactions to deposit calcium carbonate as a secondary deposit. CO_{2} is the reactant (diffuses into solution) as opposed to speleothem chemistry where CO_{2} is the product (degassed from solution). It is most likely that the majority of calcium carbonate (CaCO_{3}) creating calthemites in shapes which, mimicking speleothems, is precipitated from solution as calcite as opposed to the other, less stable, polymorphs of aragonite and vaterite.

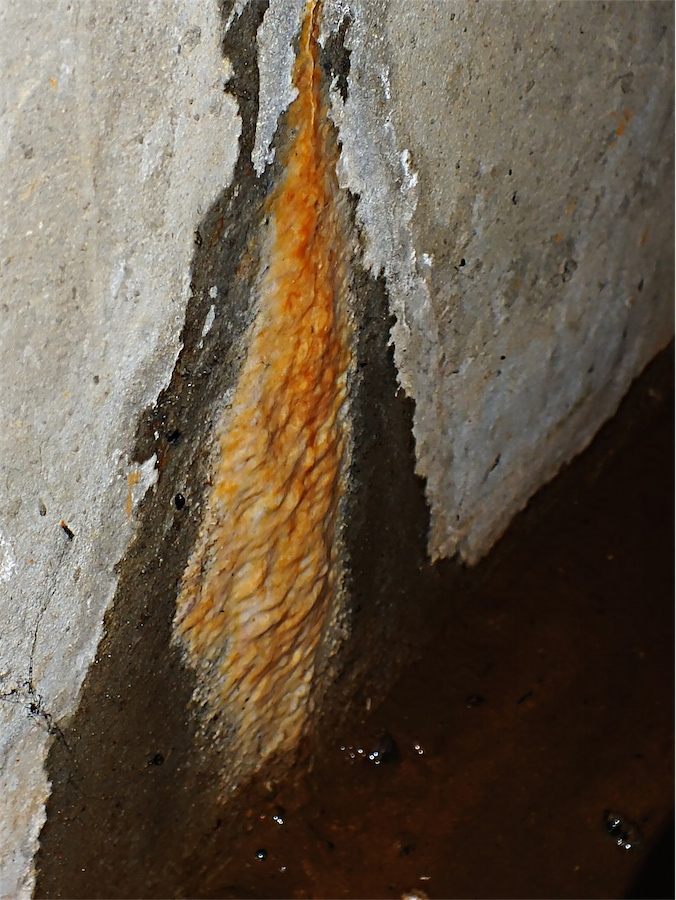
Calthemite flowstone coloured orange by Iron Oxide (from rusting steel reinforcing) deposited along with calcium carbonate ($\ce{CaCO3}$).

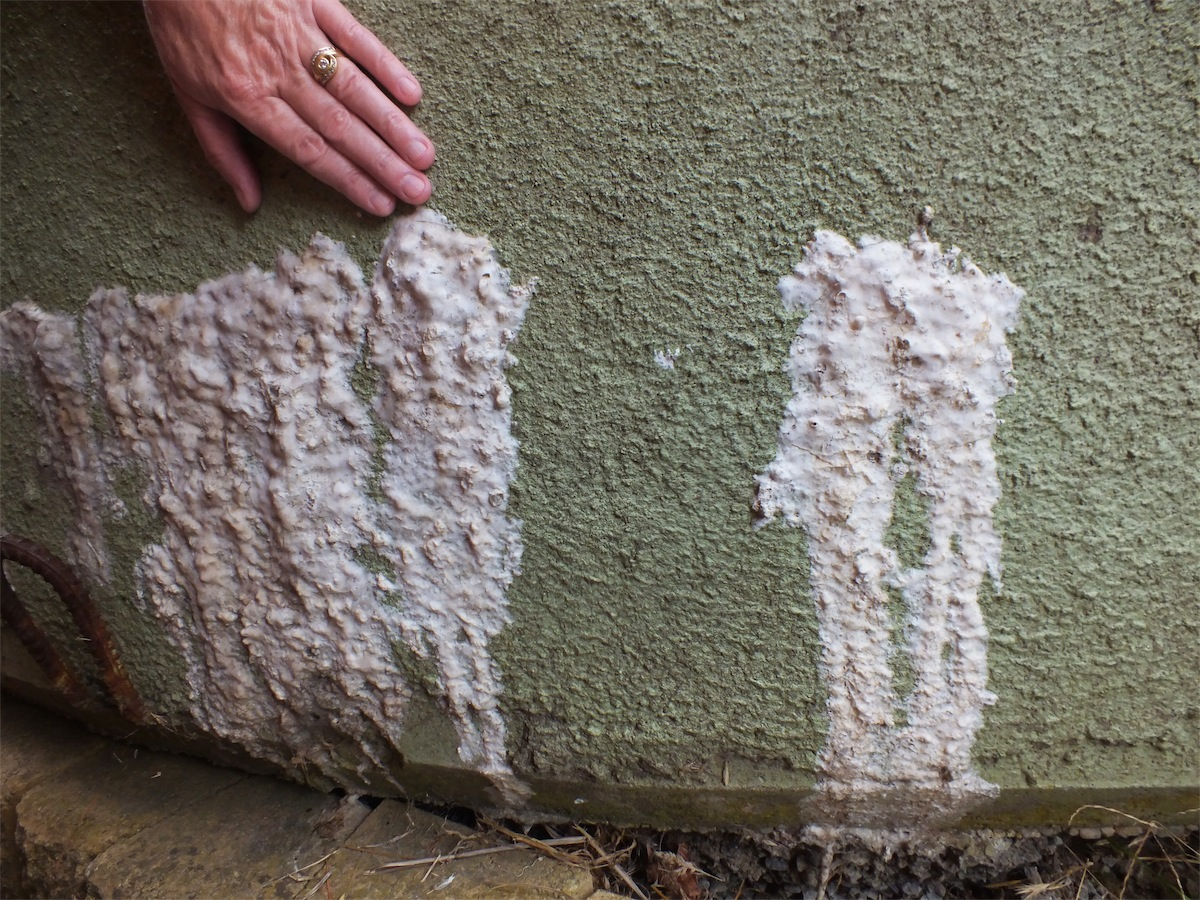
Calthemite flowstone on outside of concrete water tank

Calthemites are generally composed of calcium carbonate (CaCO_{3}) which is predominantly coloured white, but may be coloured red, orange or yellow due to iron oxide (from rusting reinforcing) being transported by the leachate and deposited along with the CaCO_{3}. Copper oxide from copper pipes may cause calthemites to be coloured green or blue. Calthemites may also contain minerals such as gypsum.

The definition of calthemites also includes secondary deposits which may occur in manmade mines and tunnels with no concrete lining, where the secondary deposit is derived from limestone, dolomite or other calcareous natural rock into which the cavity has been hollowed out. In this instance the chemistry is the same as that which creates speleothems in natural limestone caves (equations 5 to 8) below. It has been suggested the deposition of calthemite formations are one example of a natural process which has not previously occurred prior to the human modification of the Earth's surface, and therefore represents a unique process of the Anthropocene.

== Chemistry and pH ==
The way stalactites form on concrete is due to different chemistry than those that form naturally in limestone caves and is the result of the presence of calcium oxide (CaO) in cement. Concrete is made from aggregate, sand and cement. When water is added to the mix, the calcium oxide in the cement reacts with water to form calcium hydroxide (Ca(OH)_{2}), which under the right conditions can further dissociate to form calcium (Ca^{2+}) and hydroxide (OH^{−}) ions [Equation 1]. All of the following chemical reactions are reversible and several may occur simultaneously at a specific location within a concrete structure, influenced by leachate solution pH.

The chemical formula is:

CaO_{(s)} + H_{2}O_{(l)} ⇌ Ca(OH)_{2(aq)} ⇌ Ca^{2+}_{(aq)} + 2OH^{−}_{(aq)}	Equation 1

Calcium hydroxide will readily react with any free CO_{2} to form calcium carbonate (CaCO_{3}) [Equation 2]. The solution is typically pH 9 – 10.3, however this will depend on what other chemical reactions are also occurring at the same time within the concrete.

Ca(OH)_{2(aq)} + CO_{2(g)} ⇌ CaCO_{3(s)} + H_{2}O_{(l)}	Equation 2

This reaction occurs in newly poured concrete as it sets, to precipitate CaCO_{3} within the mix, until all available CO_{2} in the mix has been used up. Additional CO_{2} from the atmosphere will continue to react, typically penetrating just a few millimetres from the concrete surface. Because the atmospheric CO_{2} cannot penetrate very far into the concrete, there remains free Ca(OH)_{2} within the set (hard) concrete structure.

Any external water source (e.g. rain or seepage) which can penetrate the micro cracks and air voids in set concrete will readily carry the free Ca(OH)_{2} in solution to the underside of the structure. When the Ca(OH)_{2} solution comes in contact with the atmosphere, CO_{2} diffuses into the solution drops and over time the reaction [Equation 2] deposits calcium carbonate to create straw shaped stalactites similar to those in caves.

This is where the chemistry becomes a bit complicated, due to the presence of soluble potassium and sodium hydroxides in new concrete, which supports a higher solution alkalinity of about pH 13.2 – 13.4, the predominant carbon species is CO_{3}^{2−} and the leachate becomes saturated with Ca^{2+}. The following chemical formulae [Equations 3 & 4] will most likely be occurring, and [Equation 4] responsible for the deposition of CaCO_{3} to create stalactites under concrete structures.

OH^{−}_{(aq)} + CO_{2(g)} ⇌ HCO_{3}^{−} _{(aq)} ⇌ CO_{3}^{2−} _{(aq)} + H^{+}_{(aq)}	Equation 3

Ca^{2+}_{(aq)} + CO_{3}^{2−} _{(aq)} ⇌ CaCO_{3(s)}	Equation 4

As the soluble potassium and sodium hydroxides are leached out of the concrete along the seepage path, the solution pH will fall to pH ≤12.5. Below about pH 10.3, the more dominant chemical reaction will become [Equation 2]. The leachate solution pH influences which dominant carbonate species (ions) are present, so at any one time there may be one or more different chemical reactions occurring within a concrete structure.

In very old lime, mortar or concrete structures, possibly tens or hundreds of years old, the calcium hydroxide (Ca(OH)_{2}) may have been leached from all the solution seepage paths and the pH could fall below pH 9. This could allow a similar process to that which creates speleothems in limestone caves [Equations 5 to 8] to occur. Hence, CO_{2} rich groundwater or rainwater would form carbonic acid (H_{2}CO_{3}) (≈pH 7.5 – 8.5) and leach Ca^{2+} from the structure as the solution seeps through the old cracks [Equation 7]. This is more likely to occur in thin layered concrete such as that sprayed inside vehicle or railway tunnels to stabilise loose material. If [Equation 8] is depositing the CaCO_{3} to creating calthemites, their growth will be at a much slower rate than [Equations 2 and 4], as the weak alkaline leachate has a lower Ca^{2+} carrying capacity compared to hyperalkaline solution. CO_{2} is degassed from solution as CaCO_{3} is deposited to create the calthemite stalactites. An increased CO_{2} partial pressure (P_{CO_{2}}) and a lower temperature can increase the HCO_{3}^{−} concentration in solution and result in a higher Ca^{2+} carrying capacity of the leachate, however the solution will still not attain the Ca^{2+} carrying capacity of [Equations 1 to 4]

H_{2}O + CO_{2} ⇌ H_{2}CO_{3}	Equation 5

H_{2}CO_{3} ⇌ HCO_{3}^{−} + H^{+} ⇌ CO_{3}^{2−} + 2H^{+}	Equation 6

2H^{+} + CO_{3}^{2−} + CaCO_{3} ⇌ 2HCO_{3}^{−} + Ca^{2+}	Equation 7

2HCO_{3}^{−} _{(aq)} + Ca^{2+}_{(aq)} ⇌ CaCO_{3(s)} + H_{2}O_{(l)} + CO_{2(g)}	Equation 8

The reactions [Equations 5 to 8] could be simplified to that shown in [Equation 9], however the presence of carbonic acid (H_{2}CO_{3}) and other species are omitted. The chemical formula [Equation 9] is usually quoted as creating "speleothems" in limestone caves, however in this instance the weak carbonic acid is leaching calcium carbonate (CaCO_{3}) previously precipitated (deposited) in the old concrete and degassing CO_{2} to create calthemites.

CaCO_{3(s)} + H_{2}O_{(l)} + CO_{2(aq)} ⇌ Ca(HCO_{3})_{2(aq)} ⇌ CaCO_{3(s)} + H_{2}O_{(l)} + CO_{2(g)}	Equation 9

If the leachate finds a new path through micro cracks in old concrete, this could provide a new source of calcium hydroxide (Ca(OH)_{2}) which can change the dominant reaction back to [Equation 2]. The chemistry of concrete degradation is quite complex and only the chemistry relating to calcium carbonate deposition is considered in [Equations 1 to 9]. Calcium is also part of other hydration products in concrete, such as calcium aluminium hydrates and calcium aluminium iron hydrate. The chemical [Equations 1 to 4] are responsible for creating the majority of calthemite stalactites, stalagmites, flowstone etc., found on manmade concrete structures.

Maekawa et al., (2009) p. 230, provides an excellent graph showing the relationship between equilibrium of carbonic acids (H_{2}CO_{3}, HCO_{3}^{−} and CO_{3}^{2−}) and pH in solution. Carbonic acid includes both carbonates and bicarbonates. The graph provides a good visual aid to understanding how more than one chemical reaction may be occurring at the same time within concrete at a specific pH.

Leachate solutions creating calthemites can typically attain a pH between 10–14, which is considered a strong alkaline solution with the potential to cause chemical burns to eyes and skin – dependent on concentration and contact duration.

=== Unusual occurrences ===
There are a few unusual circumstances where speleothems have been created in caves as a result of hyperalkaline leachate, with the same chemistry as occurs in [Equations 1 to 4]. This chemistry can occur when there is a source of concrete, lime, mortar or other manmade calcareous material located above a cave system and the associated hyperalkaline leachate can penetrate into the cave below. An example can be found in the Peak District – Derbyshire, England where pollution from 19th century industrial lime production has leached into the cave system below (e.g. Poole's Cavern) and created speleothems, such as stalactites and stalagmites.

== CaCO_{3} deposition and stalactite growth ==
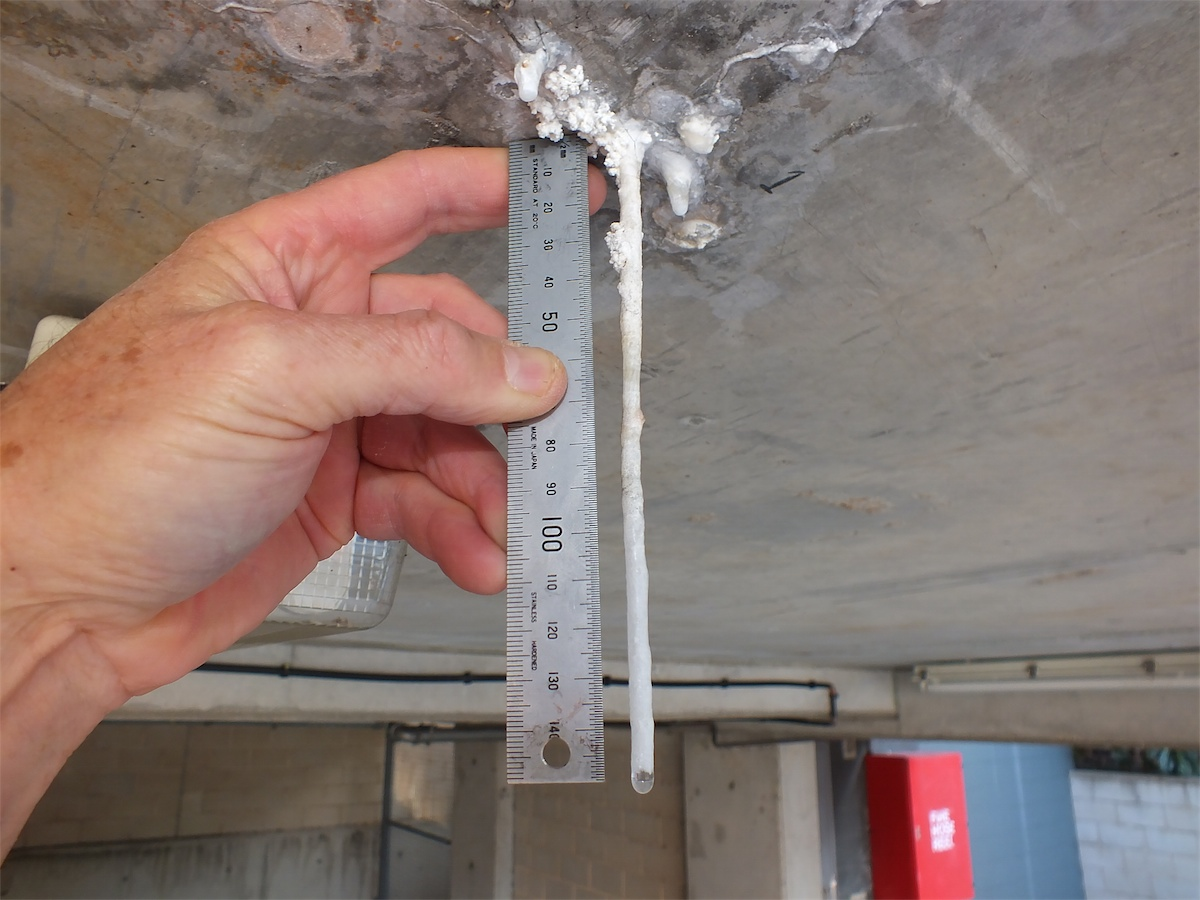
Calthemite straw stalactites can grow up to 2 mm per day in favourable conditions. This one is growing in an undercover concrete car-park.

The growth rates of calthemite stalactite straws, stalagmites and flowstone etc., is very much dependent on the supply rate and continuity of the saturated leachate solution to the location of CaCO_{3} deposition. The concentration of atmospheric CO_{2} in contact with the leachate, also has a large influence on how quickly the CaCO_{3} can precipitate from the leachate. Evaporation of the leachate solution and ambient atmospheric temperature appears to have very minimal influence on the CaCO_{3} deposition rate.

Calthemite straw stalactites precipitated (deposited) from hyperalkaline leachate have the potential to grow up to ≈200 times faster than normal cave speleothems precipitated from near neutral pH solution. One calthemite soda straw has been recorded as growing 2 mm per day over several consecutive days, when the leachate drip rate was a constant 11 minutes between drips. When the drip rate is more frequent than one drop per minute, there is no discernible deposition of CaCO_{3} at the tip of the stalactite (hence no growth) and the leachate solution falls to the ground where the CaCO_{3} is deposited to create a calthemite stalagmite. If the leachate supply to the stalactite straw's tip reduces to a level where the drip rate is greater than approximately 25 to 30 minutes between drops, there is a chance that the straw tip will calcify over and block up. New straw stalactites can often form next to a previously active, but now dry (dormant) straw, because the leachate has simply found an easier path through the micro cracks and voids in the concrete structure.

Despite both being composed of Calcium Carbonate, Calthemite straws are on average just 40% the mass per unit length of speleothem straws of equivalent external diameter. This is due to the different chemistry involved in creating the straws. The calthemite straws have a thin wall thickness and a less-dense calcium carbonate structure compared to speleothem straws.

Calthemite straws can vary in outside diameter as they grow in length. Changes in diameter can take a matter of days or weeks and are due to changes in drip rate over time. A slow dripping calthemite straw tends to be slightly larger in diameter than a fast-dripping straw.

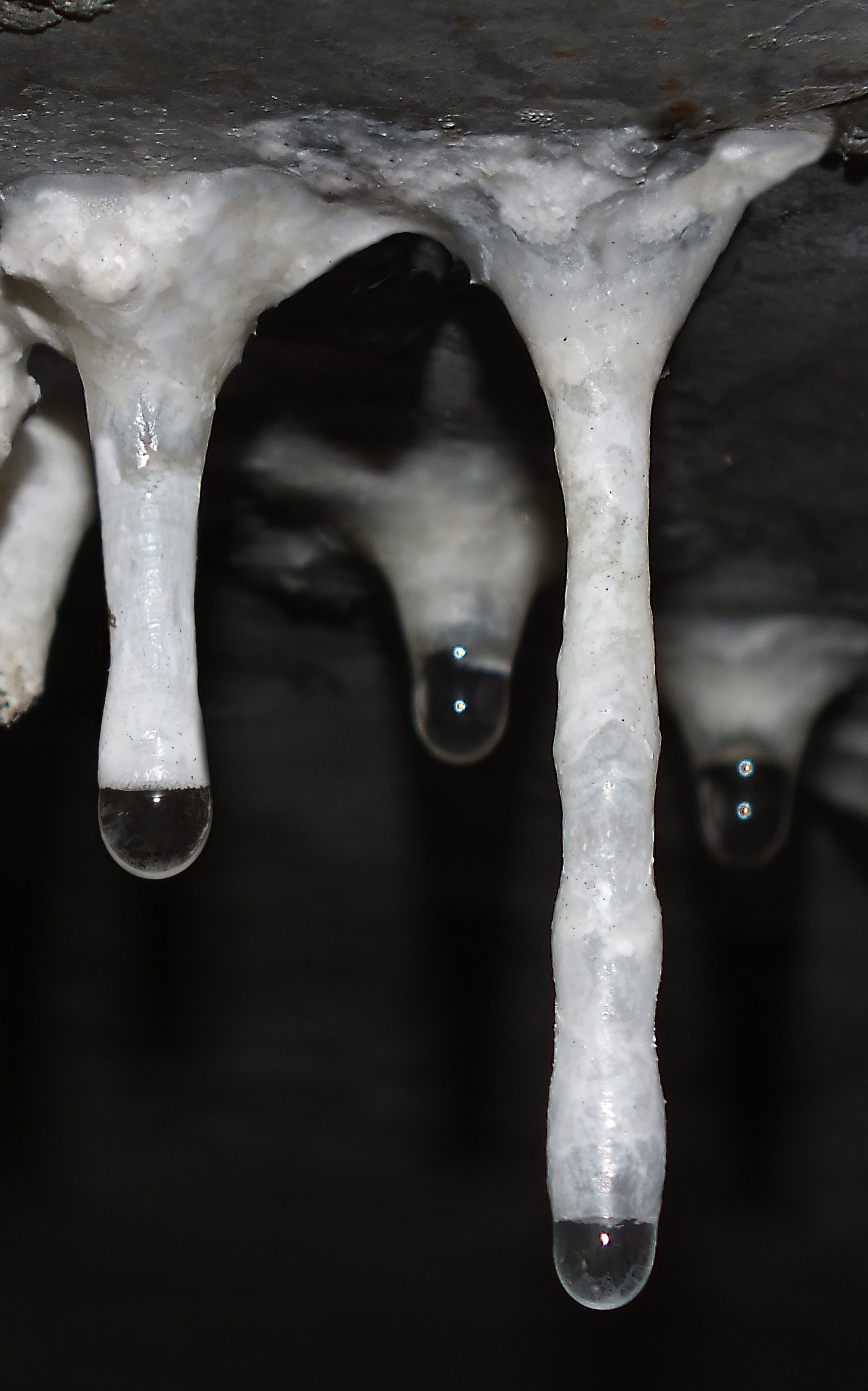
Calthemite straw with varying external diameter, influenced by changes in drip rate over time, during its growth.

== Calcite rafts on solution drops ==
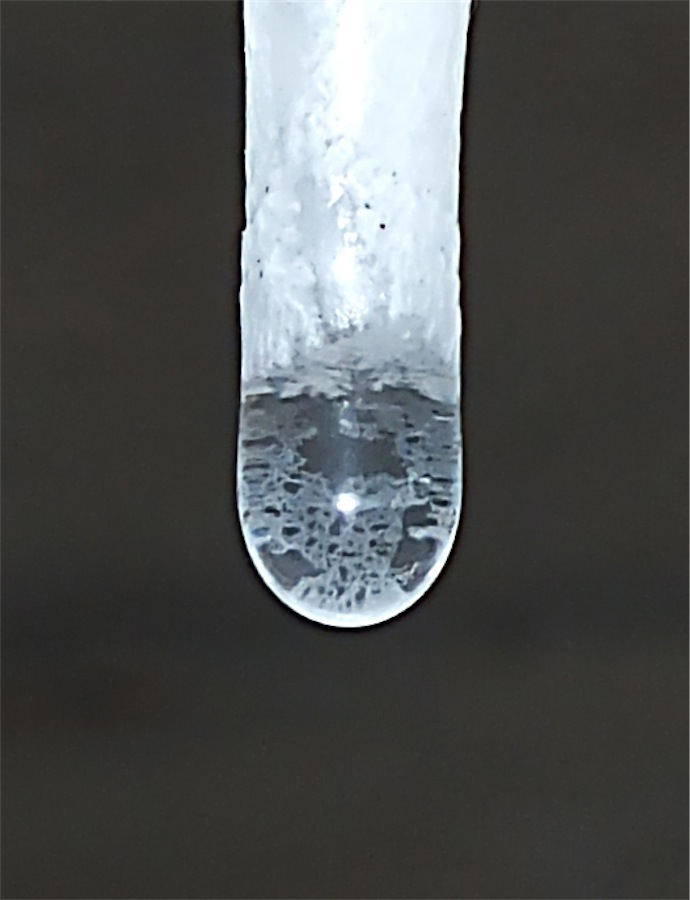
Lattice work of calcite rafts has formed on slow dripping calthemite straw drop

Calcite rafts were first observed by Allison in 1923 on solution drops attached to concrete derived straw stalactites, and later by Ver Steeg. When the drip rate is ≥5 minutes between drops, calcium carbonate will have precipitated on the solution drop surface (at the end of a stalactite) to form calcite rafts visible to the naked eye (up to 0.5 mm across). If the drip rate is greater than ≈12 minutes between drops, and there is very little air movement, these rafts may join up and become a latticework of calcite rafts covering the drop surface. Significant air movement will cause the rafts to become scattered and spin turbulently around the drop's surface. This turbulent movement of calcite rafts can cause some to shear off the drop's surface tension and be pushed onto the outside of the straw stalactite, thus increasing the outside diameter and creating minute irregularities.

== Stalagmites ==
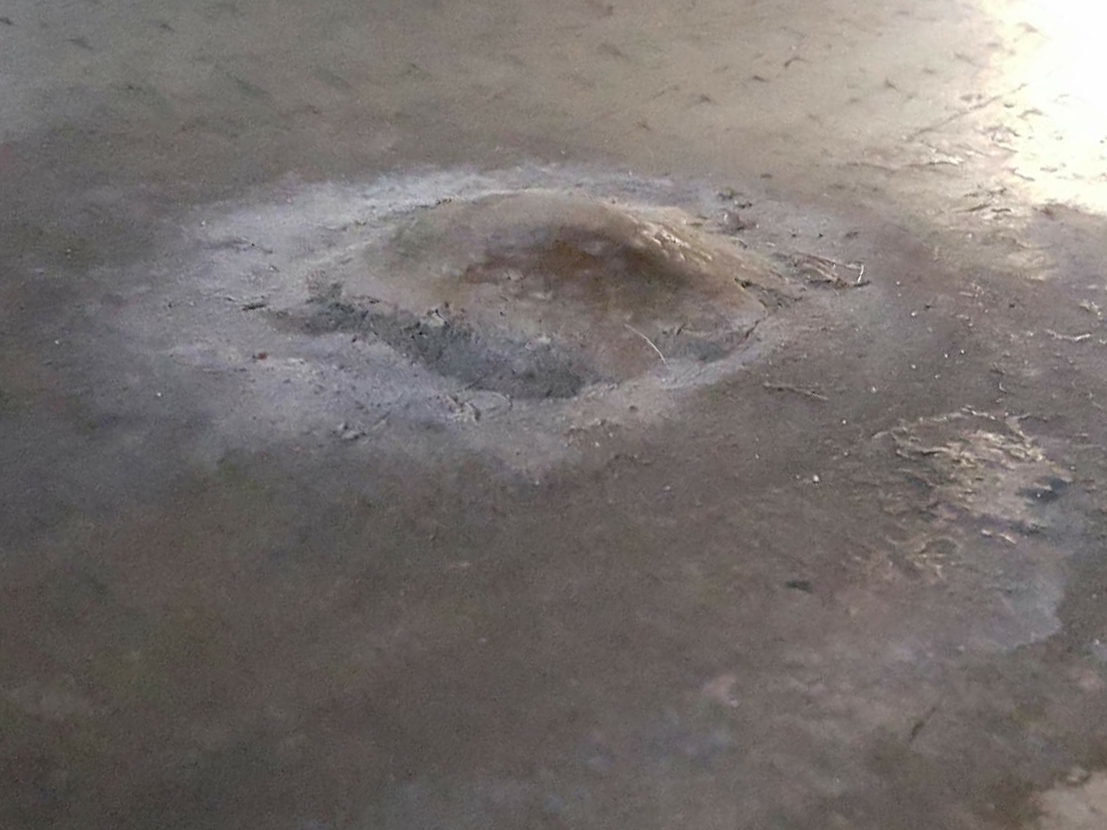
Calthemite stalagmite on concrete floor

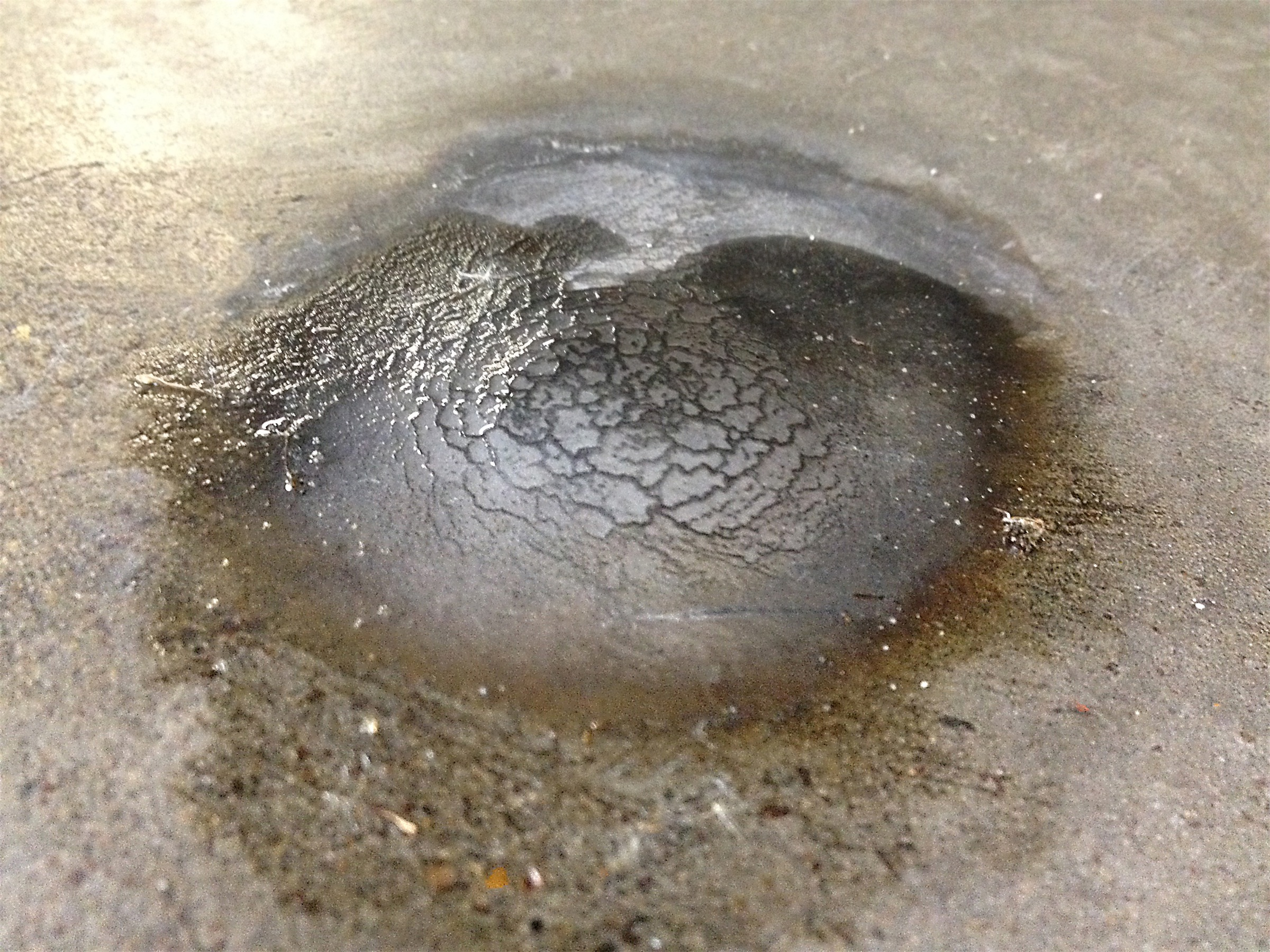
Calthemite micro-gours on a small rounded stalagmite – a secondary deposit derived from concrete

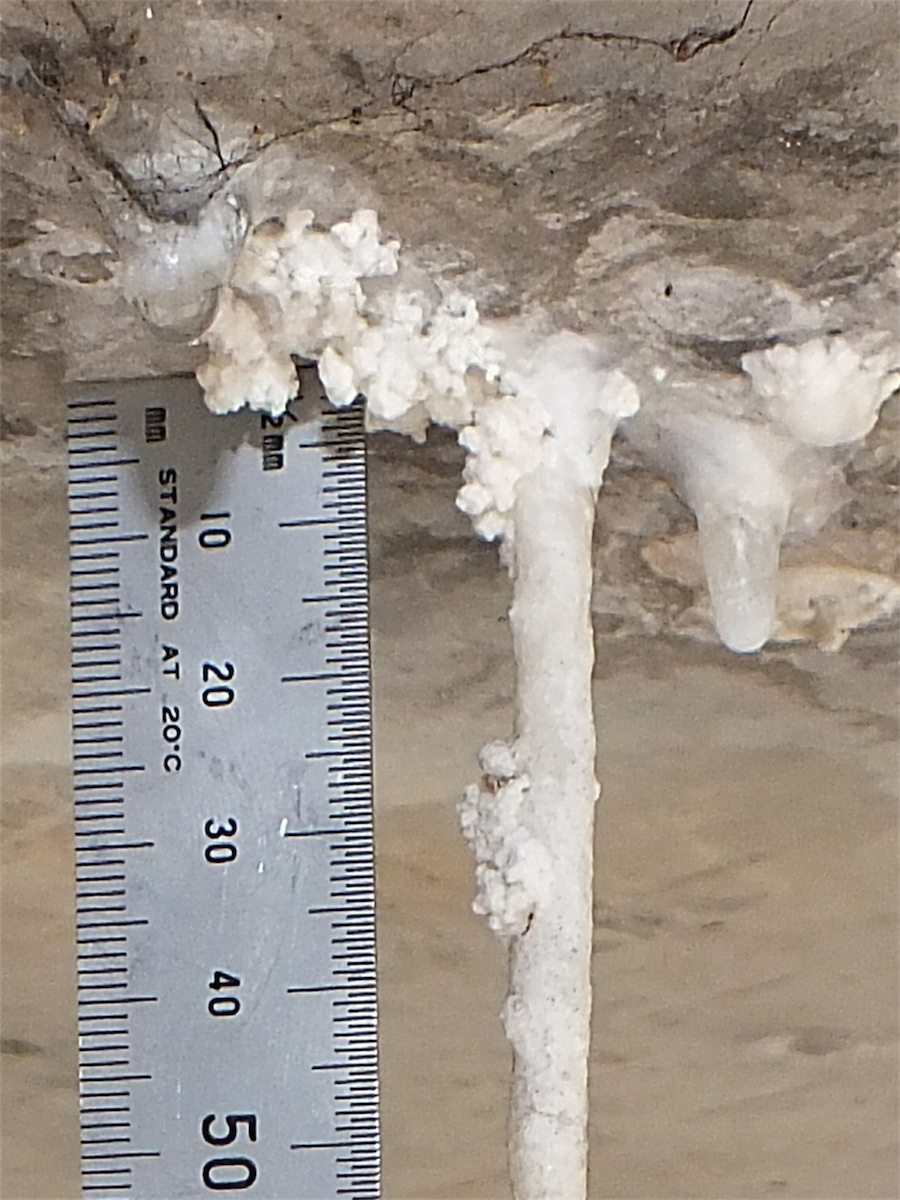
Calthemite coralloids growing on underside of concrete structure and straw stalactite

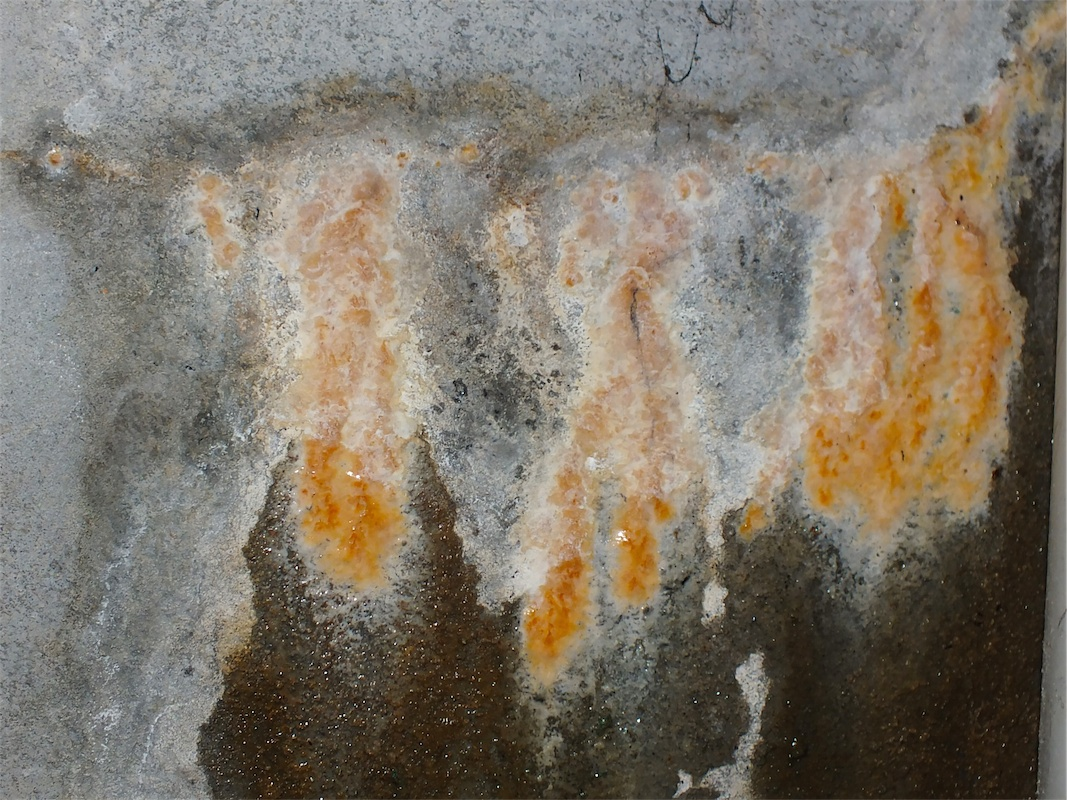
Calthemite flowstone on concrete wall, stained orange from iron oxide (from rusting steel reinforcing) being deposited along with calcium carbonate

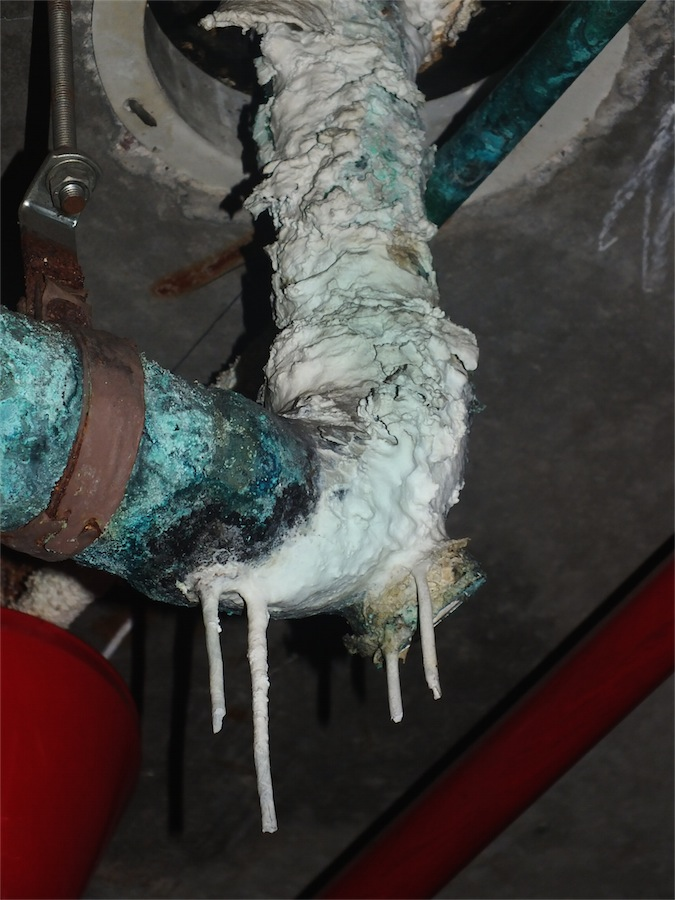
Calthemite flowstone and straw stalactites growing on copper pipes under a concrete building.

If the drip rate is quicker than one drop per minute, most of the CaCO_{3} will be carried to the ground, still in solution. The leachate solution then has a chance to absorb CO_{2} from the atmosphere (or degas CO_{2} depending on reaction) and deposit the CaCO_{3} on the ground as a stalagmite.

In most locations within manmade concrete structures, calthemite stalagmites only grow to a maximum of a few centimetres high, and look like low rounded lumps. This is because of the limited supply of CaCO_{3} from the leachate seepage path through the concrete and the amount which reaches the ground. Their location may also inhibit their growth due to abrasion from vehicle tires and pedestrian traffic.

== Rimstone or gours ==
Calthemite rimstone or gours can form beneath concrete structures on a floor with a gradual sloping surface or on the side of rounded stalagmites. When the leachate drip rate is more frequent than 1 drop per minute, most of the calcium carbonate is carried by the leachate from the underside of the concrete structure to the ground, where stalagmites, flowstone and gours are created. The leachate that does reach the ground usually evaporates quickly due to air movement beneath the concrete structure, hence micro-gours are more common than larger gours. In locations where the deposition site is subject to abrasion by vehicle tyres or pedestrians traffic, the chance of micro-gours forming is greatly reduced.

== Coralloids ==
Calthemite coralloids (also known as popcorn), can form on the underside of concrete structures and look very similar to those which occurs in caves. Coralloids can form by a number of different methods in caves, however on concrete the most common form is created when hyperalkaline solution seeps from fine cracks in concrete. Due to solution evaporation, deposition of calcium carbonate occurs before any drop can form. The resulting coralloids are small and chalky with a cauliflower appearance.

== See also ==
- Calcareous sinter – Freshwater calcium carbonate deposit
- Travertine – Form of limestone deposited by mineral springs
