= Rimstone =

Cave formation

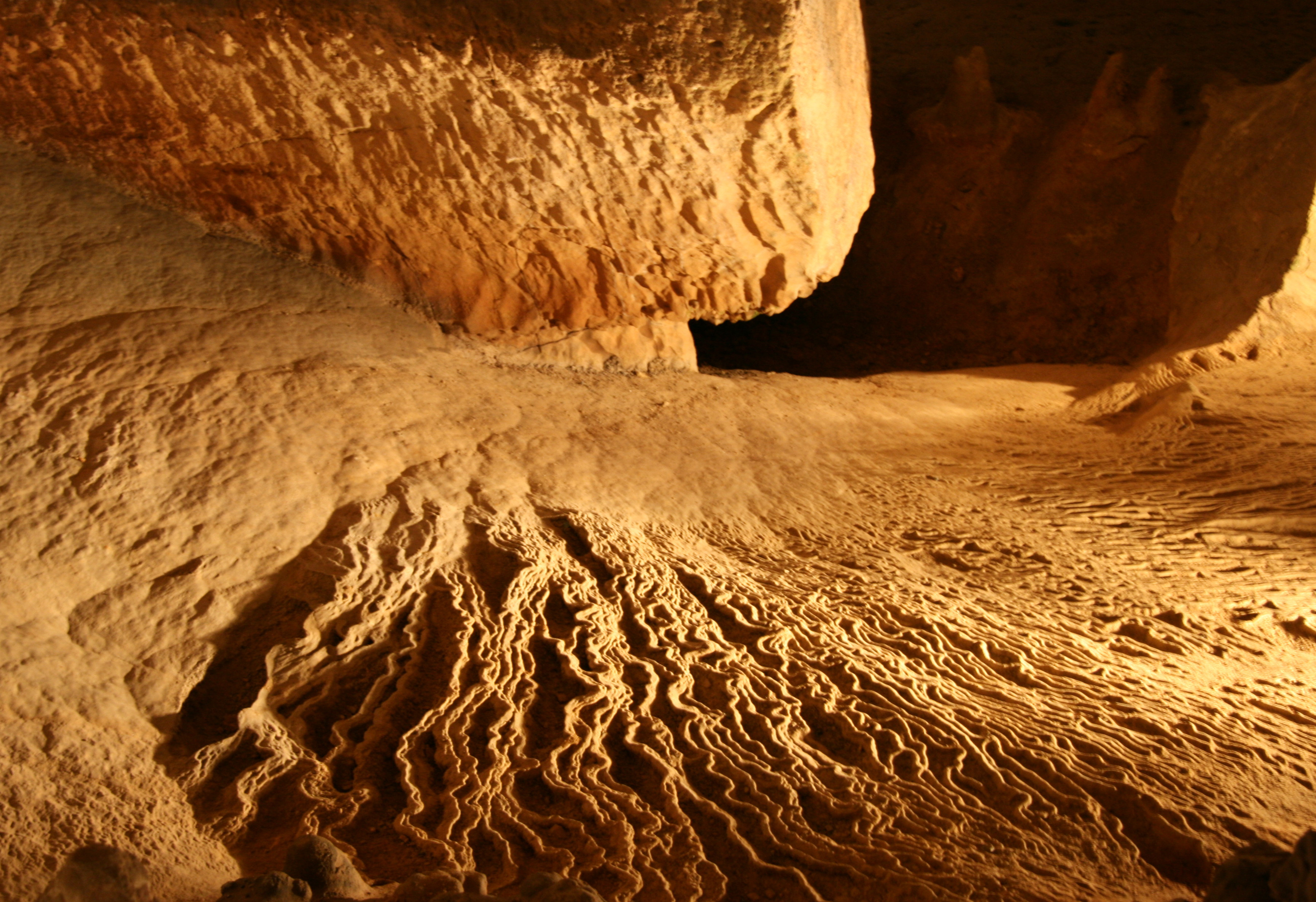
Rimstone – Endless Caverns, Virginia

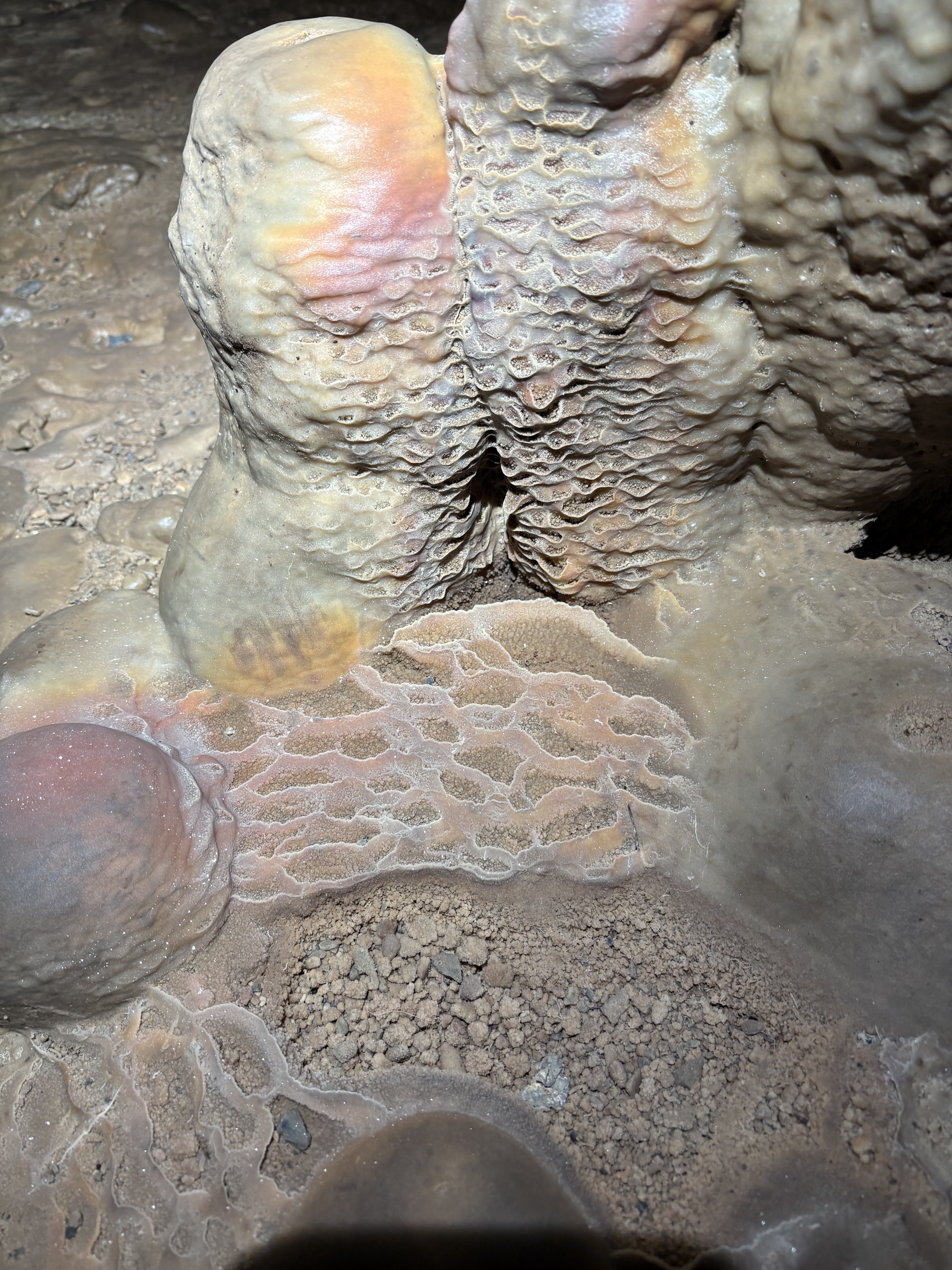
Rimstone with odd colour, From Bristol Caverns

Rimstone, also called gours, is a type of speleothem (cave formation) in the form of a stone dam. Rimstone is made up of calcite and other minerals that build up in cave pools. The formation created, which looks like stairs, often extends into flowstone above or below the original rimstone. Often, rimstone is covered with small, micro-gours on horizontal surfaces. Rimstone basins may form terraces that extend over hundreds of feet, with single basins known up to 200 feet long from Tham Xe Biang Fai in Laos.

== Formation ==
Rimstone dams form where there is some gradient, and hence flow, over the edge of a pool. Crystallization begins to occur at the air/water/rock interface. The turbulence caused by flow over the edge of the building dam may contribute to the outgassing or loss of carbon dioxide from water, and result in precipitation of mineral on this edge.

When dams form under running water, they tend to be higher when the passage is steeper. Shallow-gradient dams tend to be lower and more sinuous in nature. Rimstone is one of the most common cave formations, after flowstone, stalactites, and stalagmites.

=== Concrete derived micro-gours ===
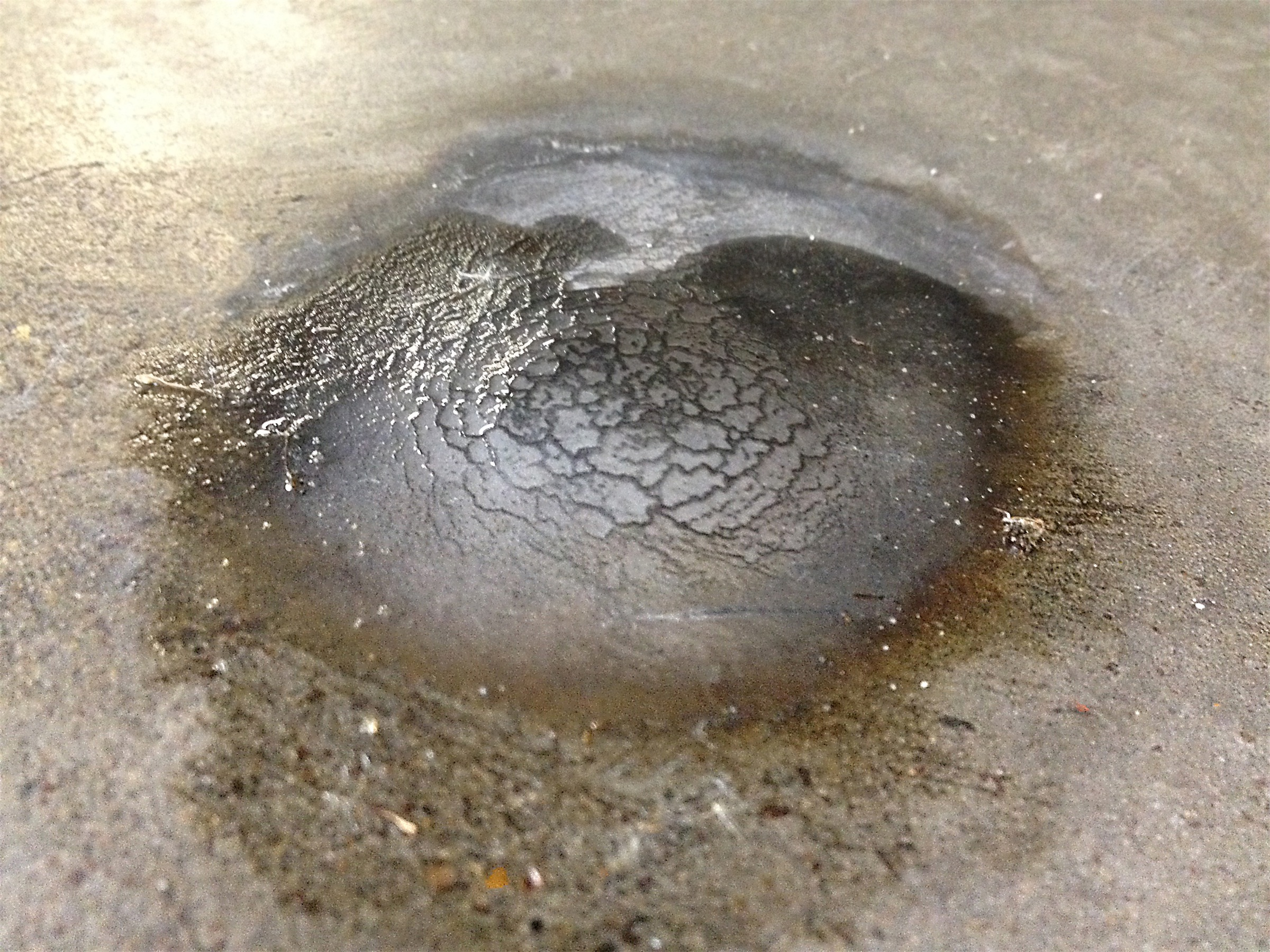
Calthemite gours on a small rounded stalagmite – a secondary deposit derived from concrete

Rimstone or gours can be formed by the secondary deposits derived from concrete, lime or mortar. These secondary deposits consisting primarily of calcium carbonate, are called calthemites and mimics the shapes and forms of cave speleothems to create stalactites, stalagmites, flowstone and gours. Gours form beneath concrete structures on a floor with a gradual sloping surface or on the side of rounded stalagmites derived from concrete. Most of the calcium carbonate carried by the leachate is deposited as stalactites (when the drop rate is slower than one drop per minute), leaving little in solution to be carried to the ground to create stalagmites, flowstone and gours. The leachate which does reach the ground usually evaporates quickly due to air movement beneath the concrete structure, hence micro-gours are more common.

The secondary deposits derived from concrete are the result of concrete degradation, where calcium ions are leached out of the concrete in solution and redeposited on the underside of a concrete structure. Calcium carbonate deposition as micro-gours occur when the solution drops to the ground under the concrete structure. Carbon dioxide is absorbed into the alkaline leachate solution, which facilitates the chemical reactions to precipitate any calcium carbonate remaining in solution as a stalagmite and micro-gours. This chemical reaction creating calthemites, is different from that which creates speleothems in limestone caves.

Secondary deposits, which create stalagmites, stalactites, flowstone, rimstone etc., outside the natural cave environment, are referred to as “calthemites”. These concrete derived secondary deposits cannot be referred to as “speleothems” due to the definition of the word.

== Gallery ==
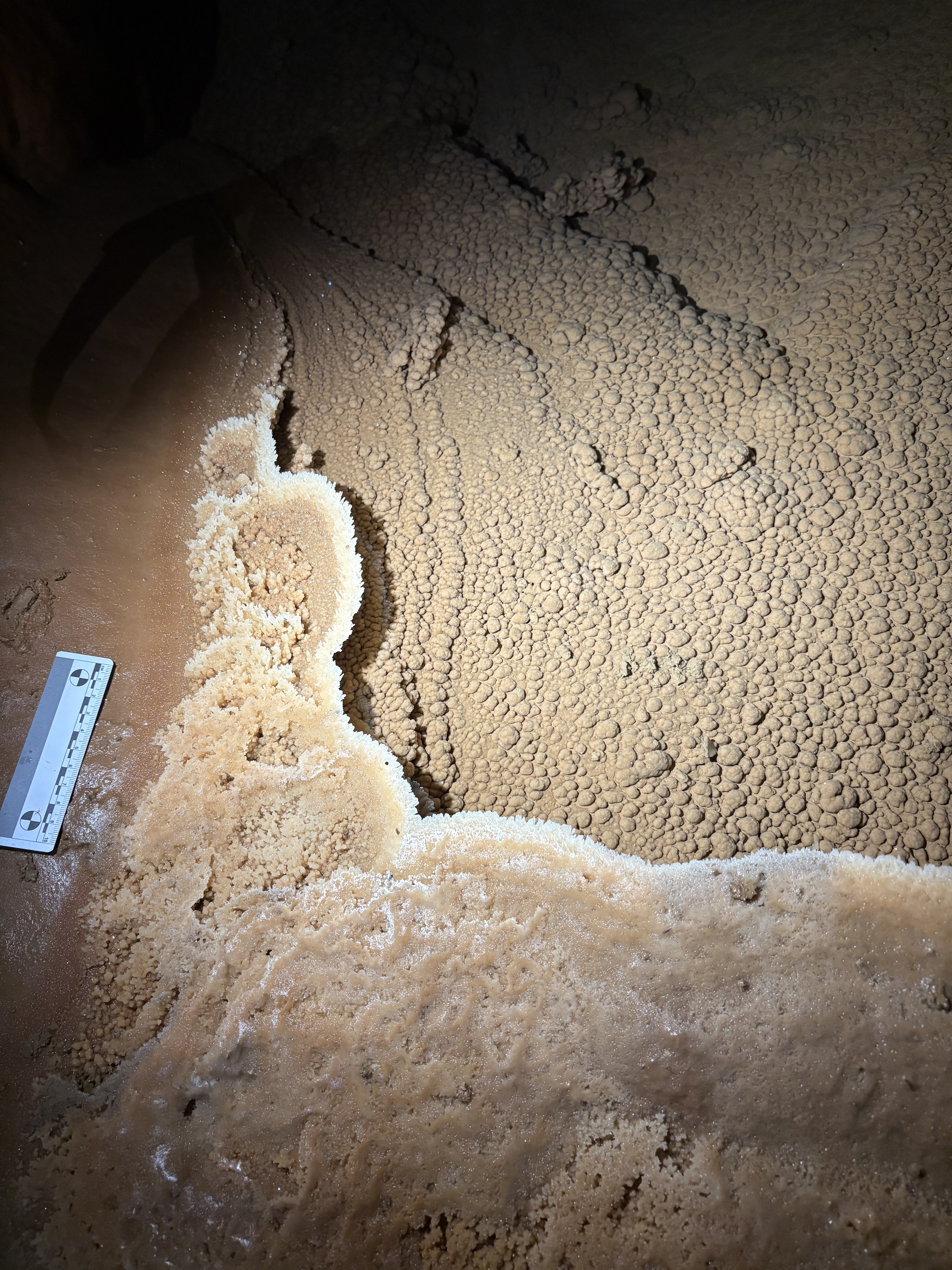
Rimstone pool with subaques coralloids and Acicular (crystal habit) aragonite

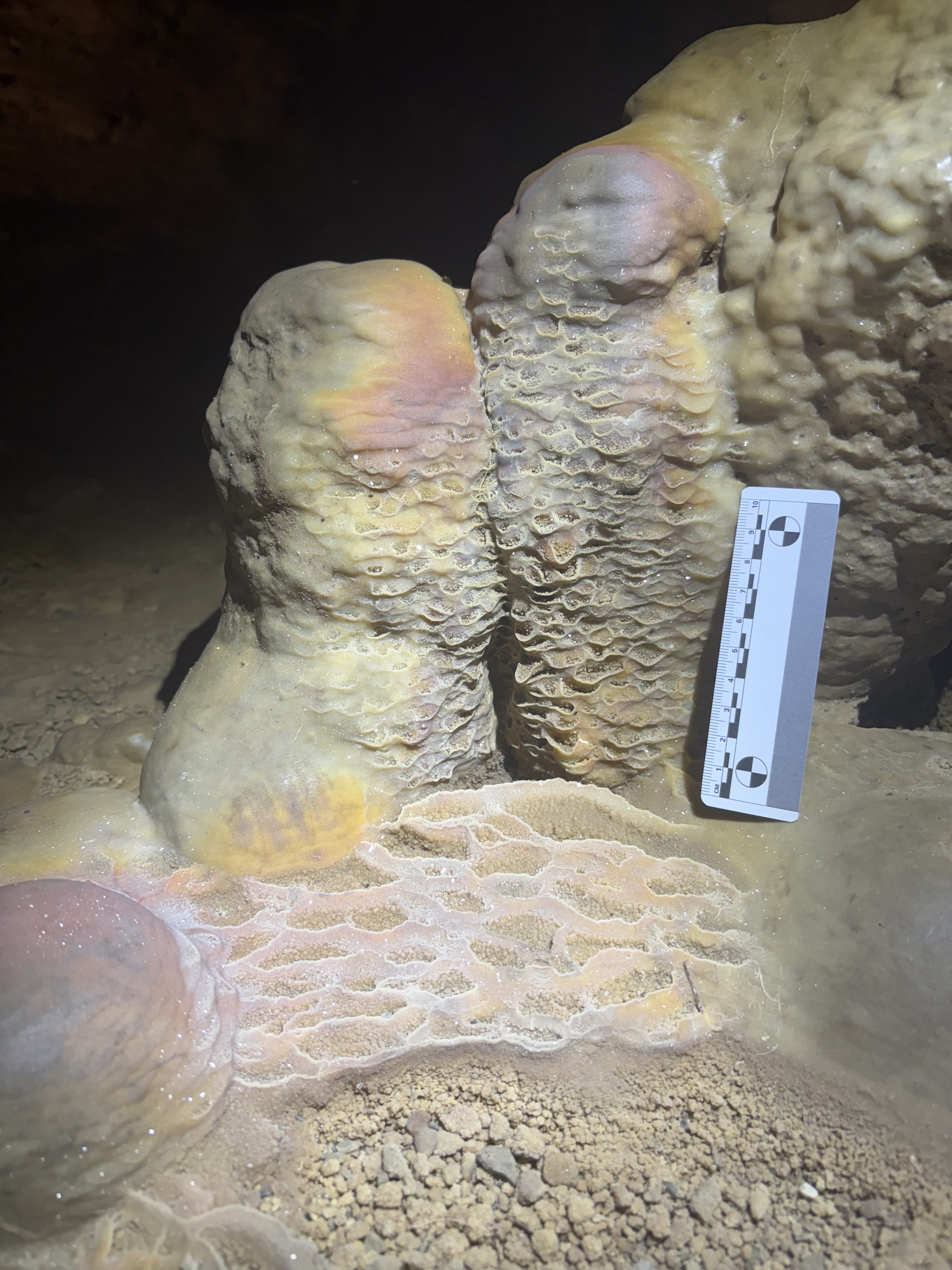
Oddly colored rimstone with scale

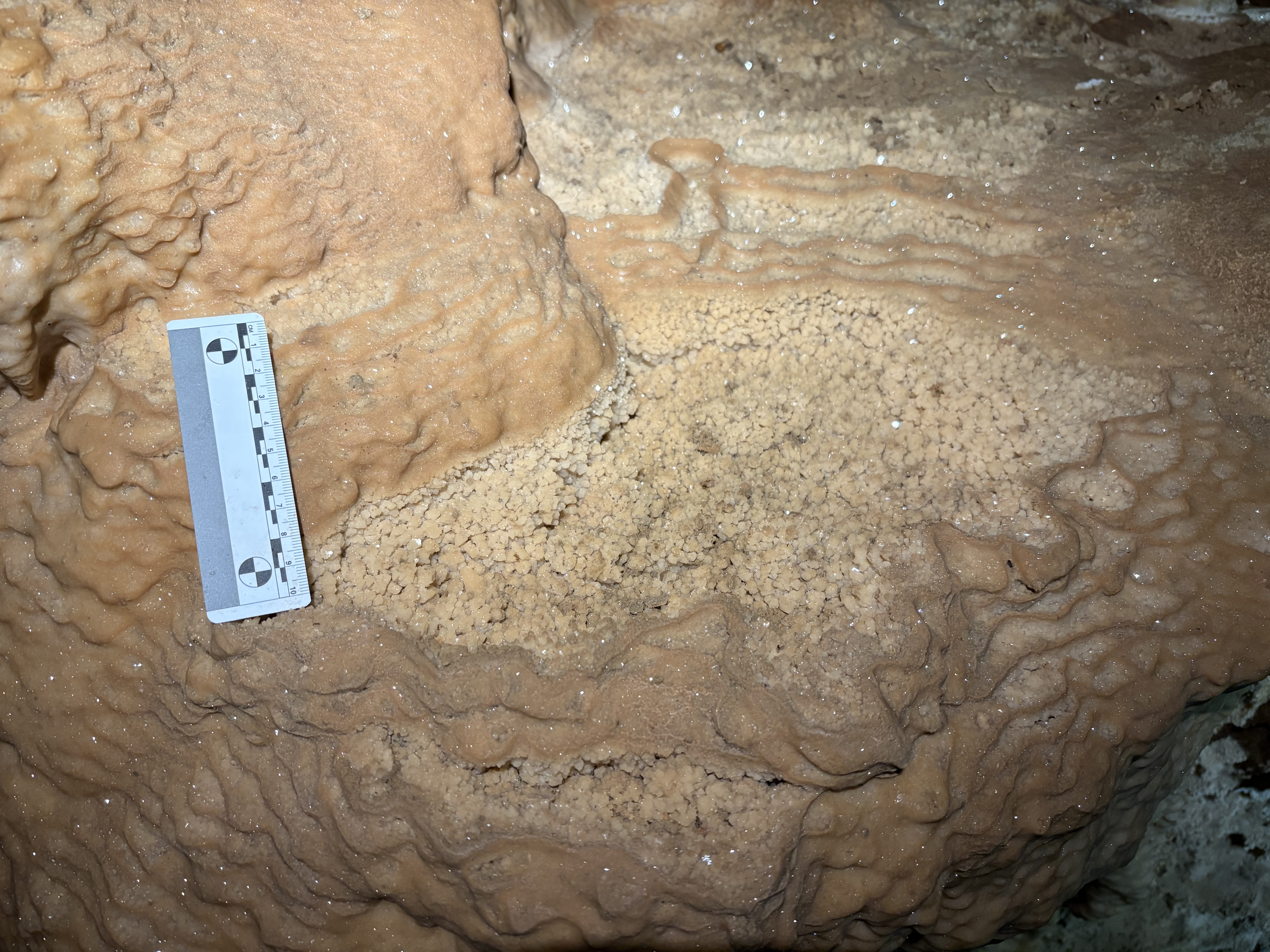
Pool spar inside a rimstone with 10cm scale

== Sources ==
- The Virtual Cave's page on Rimstone
