= Stalagmite =

Elongate mineral formation found on a cave floor

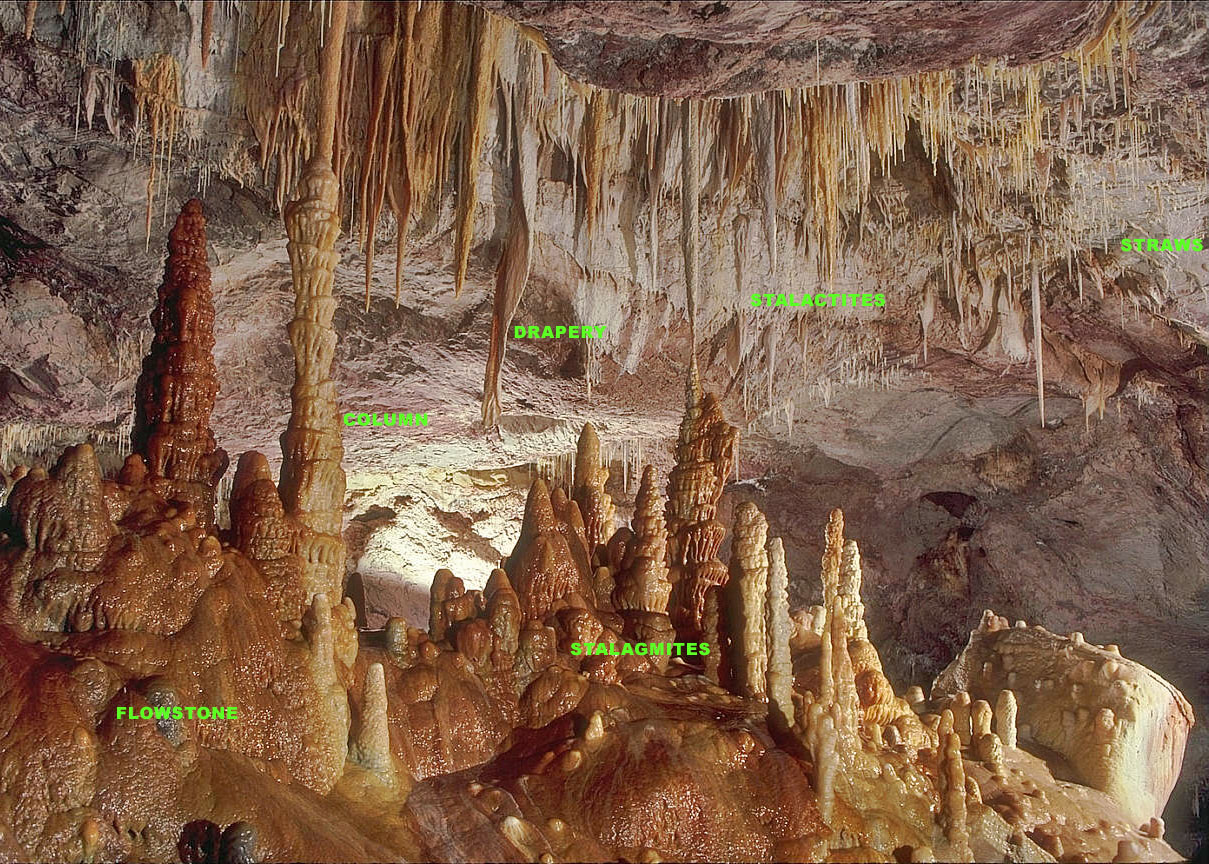
Image showing the six most common speleothems

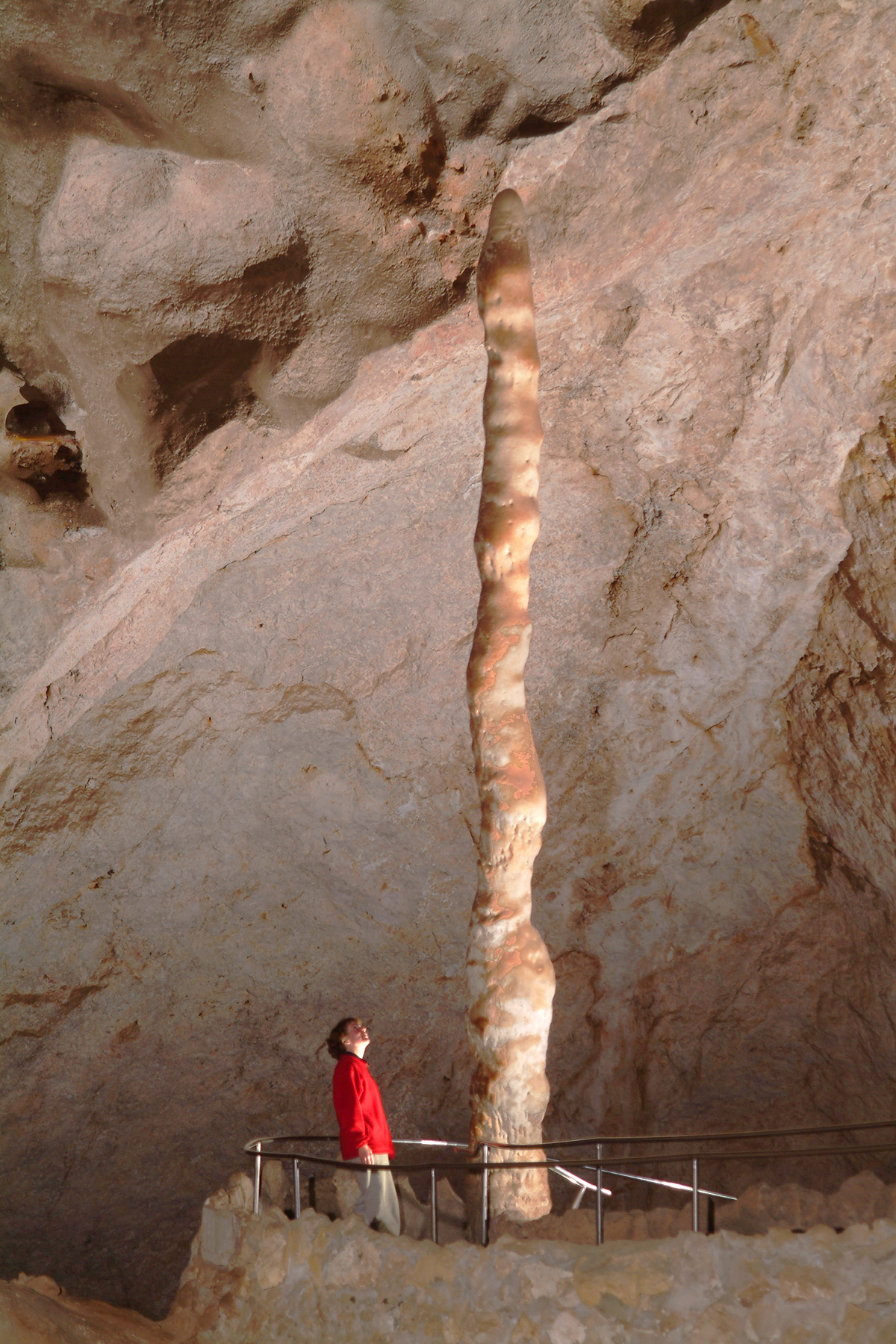
The "Witch's Finger" in Carlsbad Caverns, New Mexico

A stalagmite (UK: /ˈstæləɡˌmaɪt/, US: /stəˈlæɡmaɪt/; from Greek σταλαγμίτης (stalagmítēs); from Ancient Greek σταλαγμίας (stalagmías) 'dropping, trickling' and -ίτης (-ítēs) 'one connected to, a member of') is a type of rock formation that rises from the floor of a cave due to the accumulation of material deposited on the floor from ceiling drippings. Stalagmites are typically composed of calcium carbonate, but may consist of lava, mud, peat, pitch, sand, sinter, and amberat (crystallized urine of pack rats).

The corresponding formation hanging down from the ceiling of a cave is a stalactite.

== Formation and type ==
=== Limestone stalagmites ===
The most common stalagmites are speleothems, which usually form in limestone caves. Stalagmite formation occurs only under certain pH conditions within the cavern. They form through deposition of calcium carbonate and other minerals, which is precipitated from mineralized water solutions. Limestone is the chief form of calcium carbonate rock, which is dissolved by water that contains carbon dioxide, forming a calcium bicarbonate solution in caverns. The partial pressure of carbon dioxide in the water must be greater than the partial pressure of carbon dioxide in the cave chamber for conventional stalagmite growth.

If stalactites – the ceiling formations – grow long enough to connect with stalagmites on the floor, they form a column.

To preserve Stalagmites, it should normally not be touched, since the rock buildup is formed by minerals precipitating out of the water solution onto the existing surface; skin oils can alter the surface tension where the mineral water clings or flows, thus affecting the growth of the formation. Oils and dirt (mud, clay) from human contact can also stain the formation and change its color permanently.

=== Lava stalagmites ===
Another type of stalagmite is formed in lava tubes while molten and fluid lava is still active inside. Their mineralogical composition, close to that of siliceous minerals commonly found in basalt (for example, obsidian), the main constituent of volcanic glass, is different. Their mechanism of formation/crystallization is also notably different from that of limestone stalagmites (CaCO_{3}) but the common point is that it remains driven by gravity. Drops of molten lava (siliceous material, SiO_{2}) solidify onto the floor of the already emptied lava tube, when the lava temperature sufficiently decreases after the passage and the complete purge of the main lava flow. Essentially, it is still the gravity deposition of material onto the floor of a cave (or a void).

However the difference from calcareous stalagmites is that the transport of siliceous material occurs in the molten state and not dissolved in aqueous solution; CO_{2} degassing does not play any significant role. With lava stalagmites, their formation also happens very quickly in only a matter of hours, days, or weeks, whereas limestone stalagmites may take up to thousands or hundred thousands of years. A key difference with lava stalagmites is that once the molten lava has ceased flowing, so too will the stalagmites cease to grow. This means that if the lava stalagmites were to be broken, they would never grow back. Stalagmites in lava tubes are rarer than their stalactite counterparts because during their formation, the dripping molten material most often falls onto still-moving lava flow which absorbs or carries the material away.

The generic term "lavacicle" has been applied to lava stalactites and stalagmites indiscriminately, and evolved from the word "icicle".

=== Ice stalagmites ===
A common stalagmite found seasonally or year round in many caves is the ice stalagmite, commonly referred to as icicles, especially in above-ground contexts. Water seepage from the surface will penetrate into a cave and if temperatures are below freezing temperature, the water will collect on the floor into stalagmites. Deposition may also occur directly from the freezing of water vapor. Similar to lava stalagmites, ice stalagmites form very quickly within hours or days. Unlike lava stalagmites however, they may grow back as long as water and temperatures are suitable. Ice stalagmites are more common than their stalactite counterparts because warmer air rises to the ceilings of caves and may raise temperatures to above freezing.

Ice stalactites may also form corresponding stalagmites below them, and given time, may grow together to form an ice column.

=== Concrete derived stalagmites ===
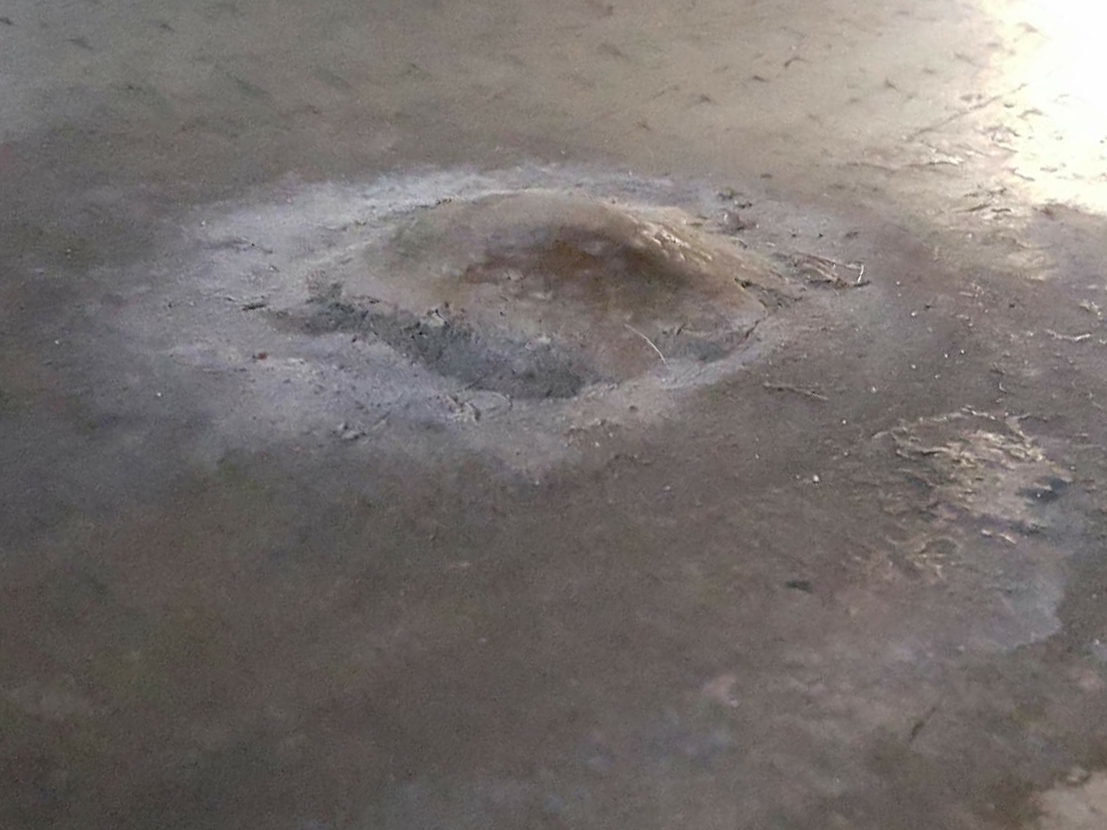
Calthemite stalagmite growing on a floor beneath a concrete structure

Stalactites and stalagmites can also form on concrete ceilings and floors, although they form much more rapidly there than in the natural cave environment.

The secondary deposits derived from concrete are the result of concrete degradation, where calcium ions are leached out of the concrete in solution and redeposited on the underside of a concrete structure to form stalactites and stalagmites. Calcium carbonate deposition as a stalagmite occurs when the solution carries the calcium laden leachate solution to the ground under the concrete structure. Carbon dioxide is absorbed into the alkaline leachate solution, which facilitates the chemical reactions to deposit calcium carbonate as a stalagmite. These stalagmites rarely grow taller than a few centimetres.

Secondary deposits, which create stalagmites, stalactites, flowstone etc., outside the natural cave environment, are referred to as "calthemites". These concrete derived secondary deposits cannot be referred to as "speleothems" due to the definition of the word.

== Records ==
The largest known stalagmite in the world exceeds 70 metres (230 ft) in height and is in Sơn Đoòng Cave, Vietnam.

In the Zagros Mountains of south Iran, approximately 6 km (3.7 miles) from the ancient city of Bishapur, in the Shapur cave on the fourth of five terraces stands the 3rd-century colossal statue of Shapur I, second ruler of the Sassanid Empire. The statue, carved from one stalagmite, is nearly 7 m (23 ft) high.

== Photo gallery ==
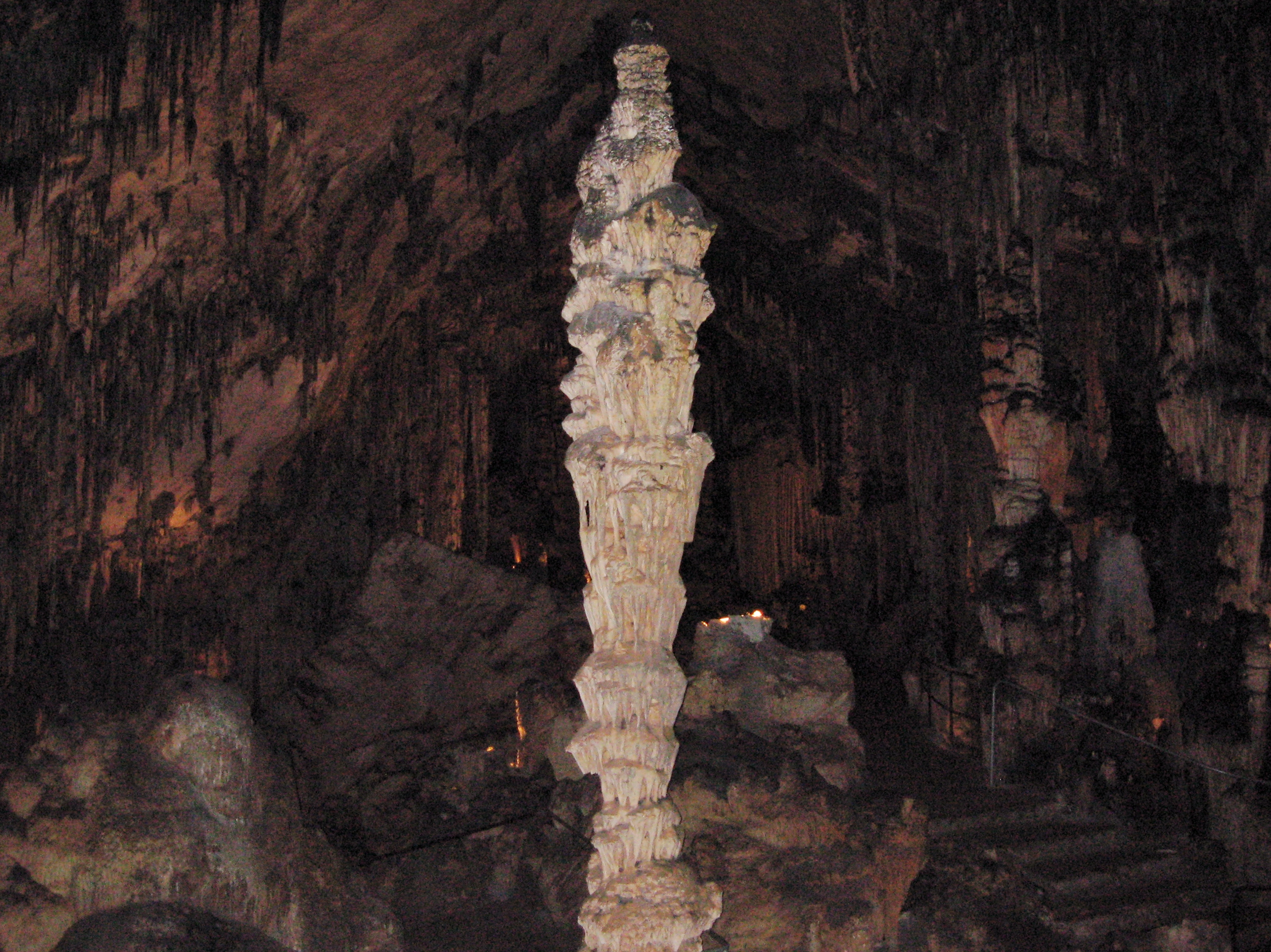
Coves d'Artà, Mallorca, Spain

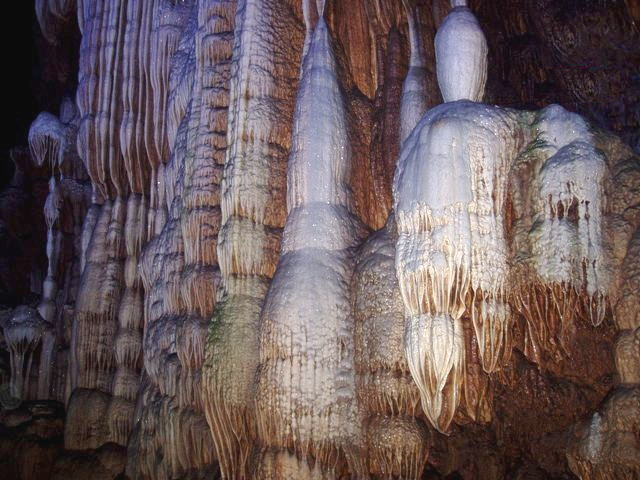
Seven-star Cave, Guilin, China

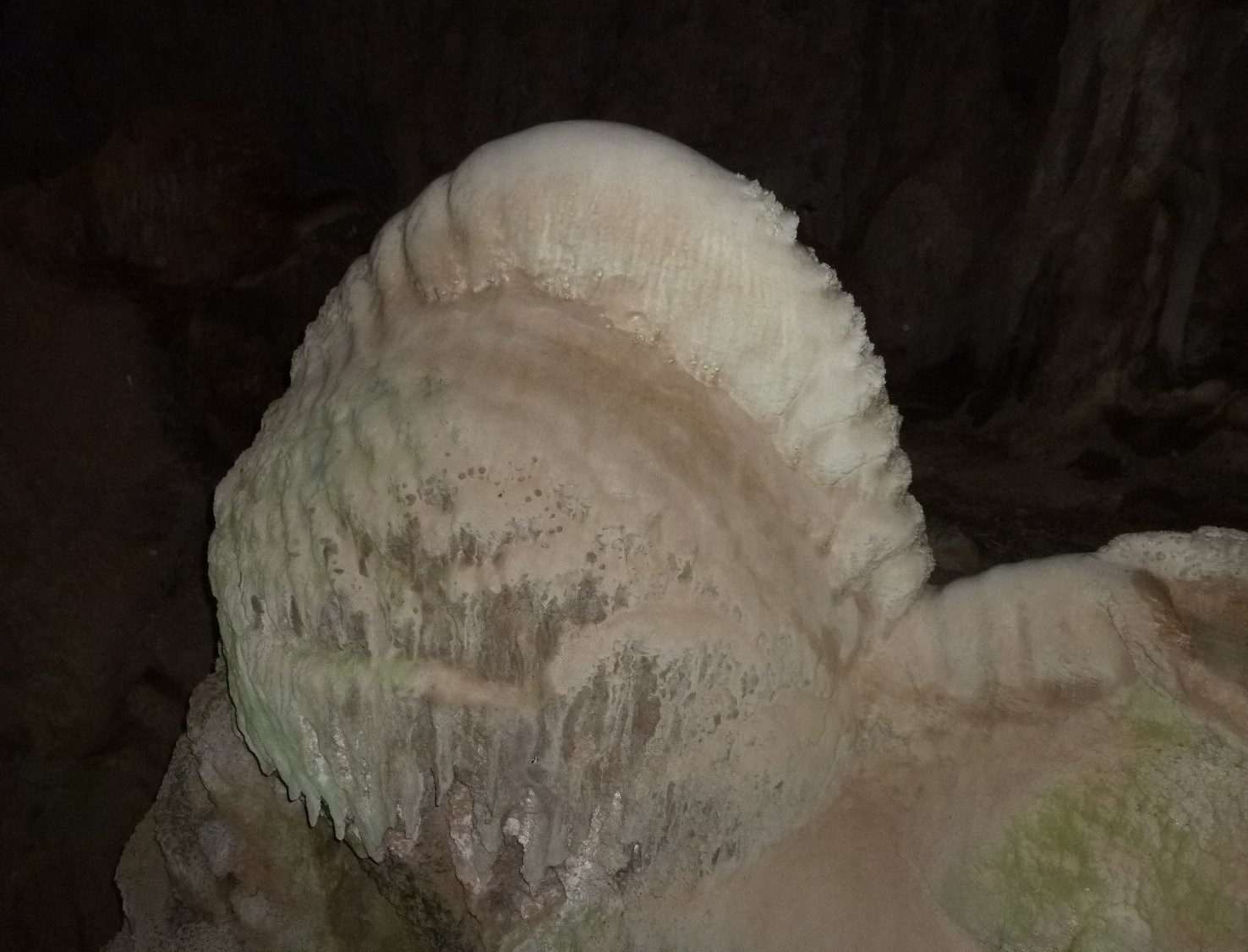
A "crayfish back", Jenolan Caves, New South Wales, Australia

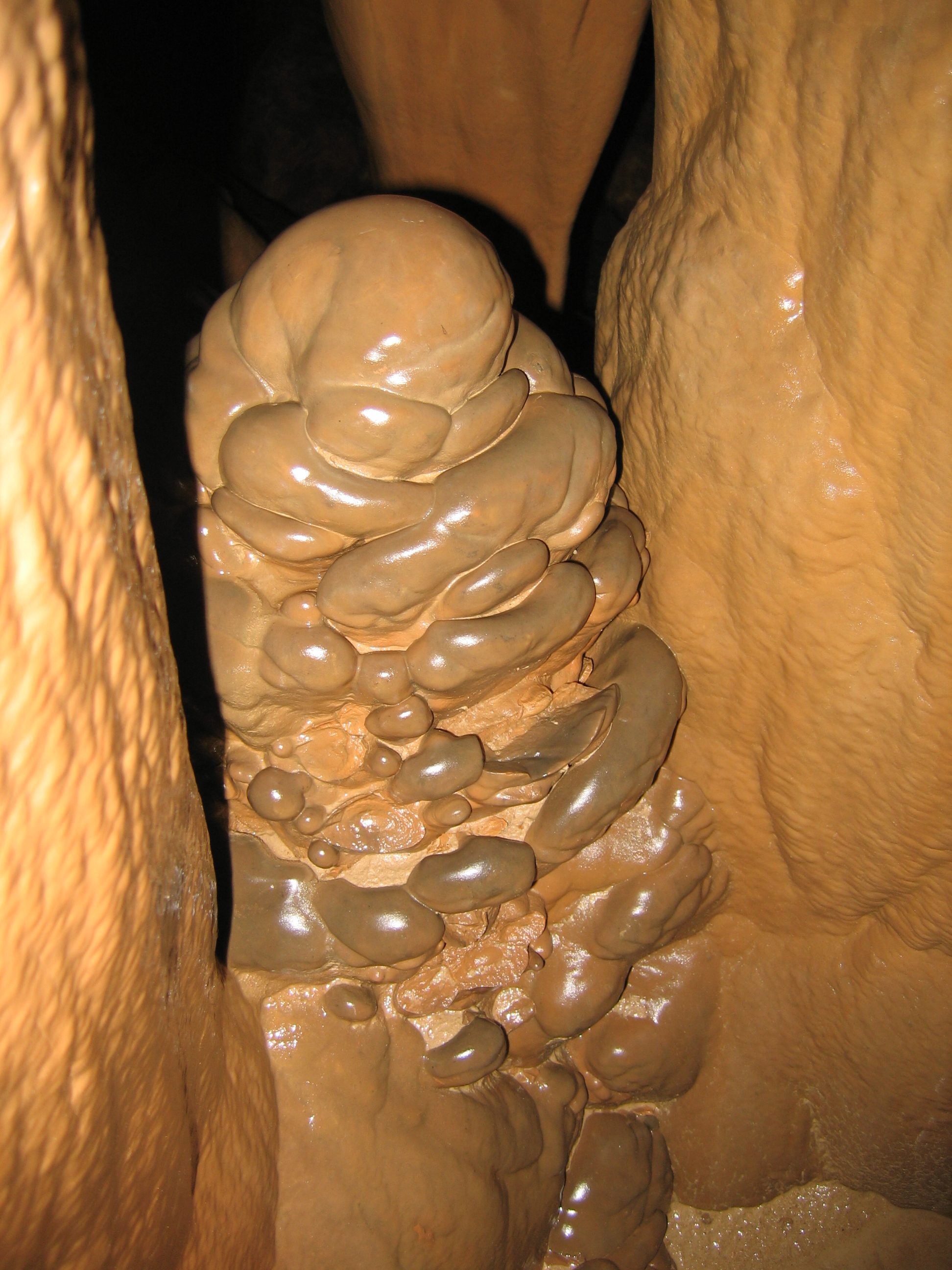
Hérault, France

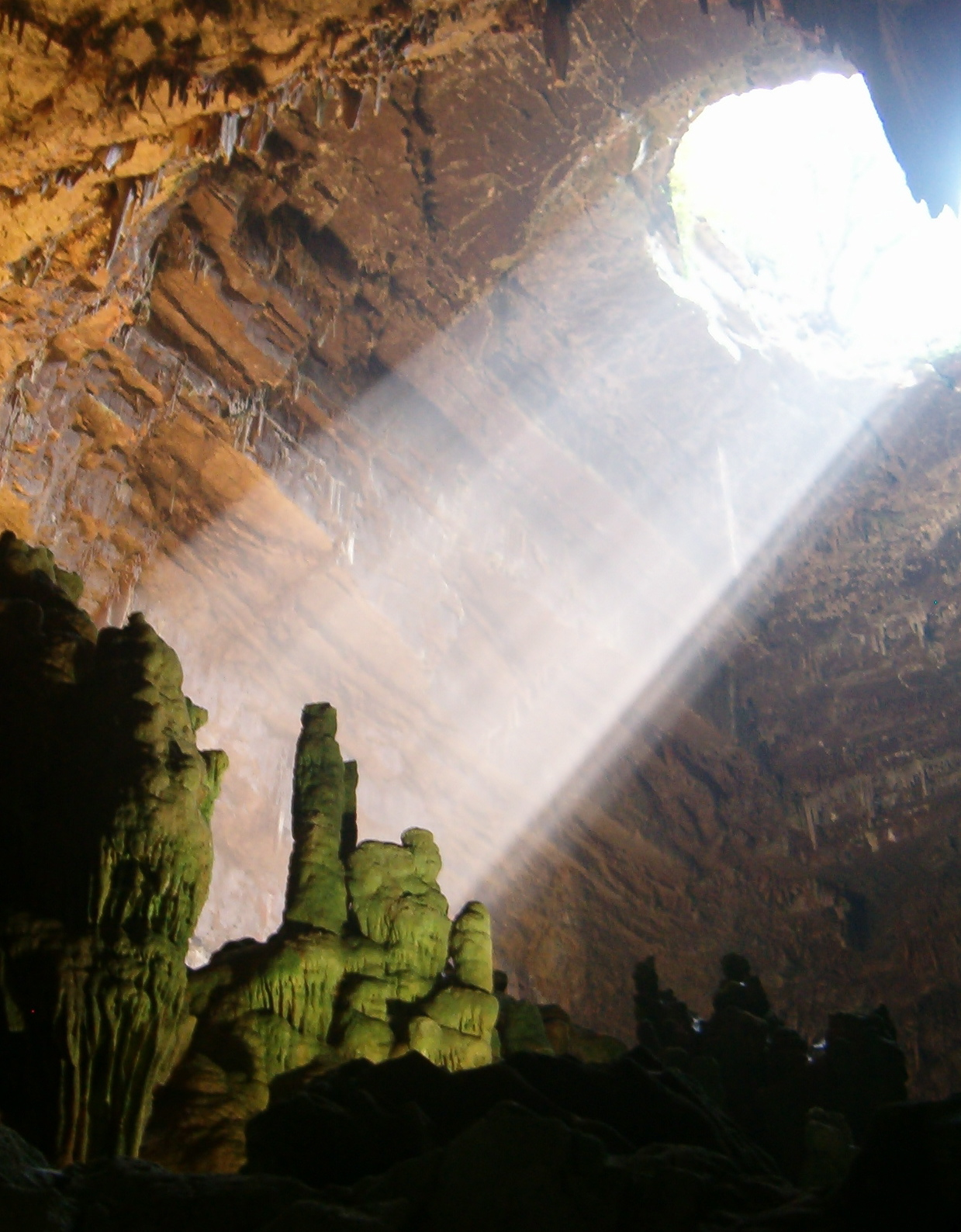
Castellana Grotte, Apulia, Italy
