= Onyx (disambiguation) =

Onyx is a banded variety of chalcedony (quartz).

Onyx may also refer to:

== Locations ==
- Onyx, California, a census-designated place located in Kern County, California
- Onyx, Arkansas
- Onyx Cave (disambiguation), a common name for caves in the United States
- Onyx River, a meltwater stream in the Antarctic
- The Onyx Club, a jazz club in Pasadena, California, part of The Hotel Carver
- Onyx Club (New York City), a jazz club on 52nd Street, in Manhattan, New York City

== Entertainment ==
- Onyx, a fictitious planet set in the Halo franchise, mentioned in the novel Halo: Ghosts of Onyx and the Halo Halo TV series
- Onyx, a 2005 episode of the TV series Smallville
- Onyx (wrestler), pro wrestler Kyle McNeely

== Characters ==
- Onyx (comics), a fictional comic book character in the DC Universe, mainly associated with the Batman titles
- Onyx Von Trollenberg, a character from the animated series Trollz

== Medicine ==
- Onyx (interventional radiology), EVOH based liquid embolic agent
- Onyx Pharmaceuticals, a drug manufacturer

== Organizations ==
- Onyx (architectural collective), an architectural collective that practiced in New York City from 1968 to 1972
- Onyx Collective, a content brand owned by Disney Entertainment championing projects from individuals belonging to underrepresented groups
- Onyx Creative, an US architecture and design firm
- Veolia Environmental Services, formerly Onyx Environnement
- Onyx Grand Prix, a short-lived Formula One team, 1989–1990
- Onyx Sports Cars, a UK kit car manufacturer

== Technology ==
- SGI Onyx, a line of symmetric multiprocessing computers from Silicon Graphics
- Synaptics Onyx, a concept cellphone designed to display Synaptics ClearPad technology
- Onyx International Inc, a company producing the Onyx Boox ebook readers
- Onyx (satellite), a code name often associated with newer variants of the Lacrosse satellite
- Onyx (interception system), a Swiss intelligence gathering system
- Onyx-015, an adenovirus being researched for cancer treatment
- OnyX, a freeware system maintenance and optimization tool for Mac OS X
- Onyx Systems, a company that made computer systems based on the Zilog Z8000 microprocessor and Bell Labs' Unix
- BlackBerry Bold 9700 (codenamed "Onyx"), a smartphone from RIM

== Vessels ==
- USS Onyx (PYc-5), a United States Navy patrol vessel of the mid-20th century
- HMS Onyx, the name of seven ships of the Royal Navy
- MS Onyx, a passenger ferry formerly known as Fennia and Casino Express

== Music ==
- Onyx (hip hop group), a Queens-based hip-hop group
- Onyx (Cornish band), a Cornish 1960s band
- The Onyx Hotel Tour, 2004 tour by pop singer Britney Spears
- Onyx (DJ), an Israeli DJ

=== Albums ===
- Onyx (Pop Evil album), 2013
- Onyx (Ava Inferi album), 2011

== Other uses ==
- Onyx (game), a strategy board game invented by Larry Back
- Onyx: Black Lesbian Newsletter, a 1980s Californian magazine
- Onyx, a Monotype typeface
- Peugeot Onyx, a concept car produced by the French car manufacturer Peugeot

== See also ==
- Onix (disambiguation)
- P-800 Oniks, a Russian/Soviet supersonic anti-ship cruise missile
