= Flowstone =

Geological phenomenon

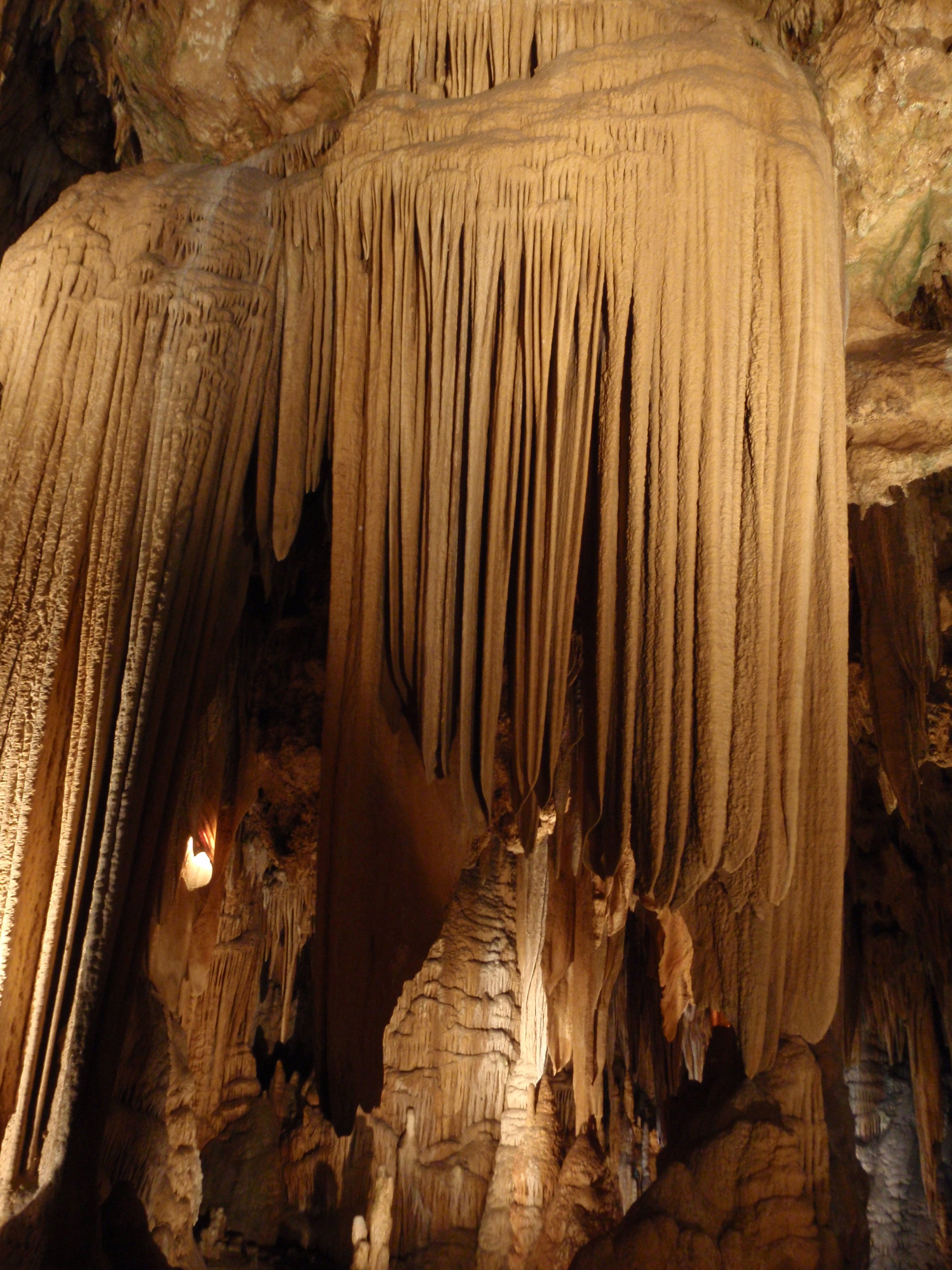
Saracen's tent in Luray Caverns in Virginia is considered to be one of the most well-formed flowstone draperies in the world

Flowstones are sheetlike deposits of calcite or other carbonate minerals, formed where water flows down the walls or along the floors of a cave. They are typically found in "solution caves", in limestone, where they are the most common speleothem. However, they may form in any type of cave where water enters that has picked up dissolved minerals. Flowstones are formed via the degassing of vadose percolation waters.

Flowstone may also form on manmade structures as a result of calcium hydroxide being leached from concrete, lime or mortar. These secondary deposits created outside the cave environment, which mimic the shapes and forms of speleothems, are classified as "calthemites" and are associated with concrete degradation.

== Formation ==
Diagram of dripstone cave structures (flowstone labelled AB)

Flowing films of water that move along floors or down positive-sloping walls build up layers of calcium carbonate (calcite), aragonite, gypsum, or other cave minerals. These minerals are dissolved in the water and are deposited when the water loses its dissolved carbon dioxide through the mechanism of agitation, meaning it can no longer hold the minerals in solution. The flowstone forms when thin layers of these deposits build on each other, sometimes developing more rounded shapes as the deposit gets thicker.

There are two common forms of flowstones, tufa and travertine. Tufa is usually formed via the precipitation of calcium carbonate, and is spongy or porous in nature. Travertine is a calcium carbonate deposit often formed in creeks or rivers; its nature is laminated, and it includes such structures as stalagmites and stalactites.

The deposits may grade into thin sheets called "drapery" or "curtains" where they descend from overhanging portions of the wall. Some draperies are translucent, and some have brown and beige layers that look much like bacon (often termed "cave bacon"). The edges often develop a sawtooth pattern.

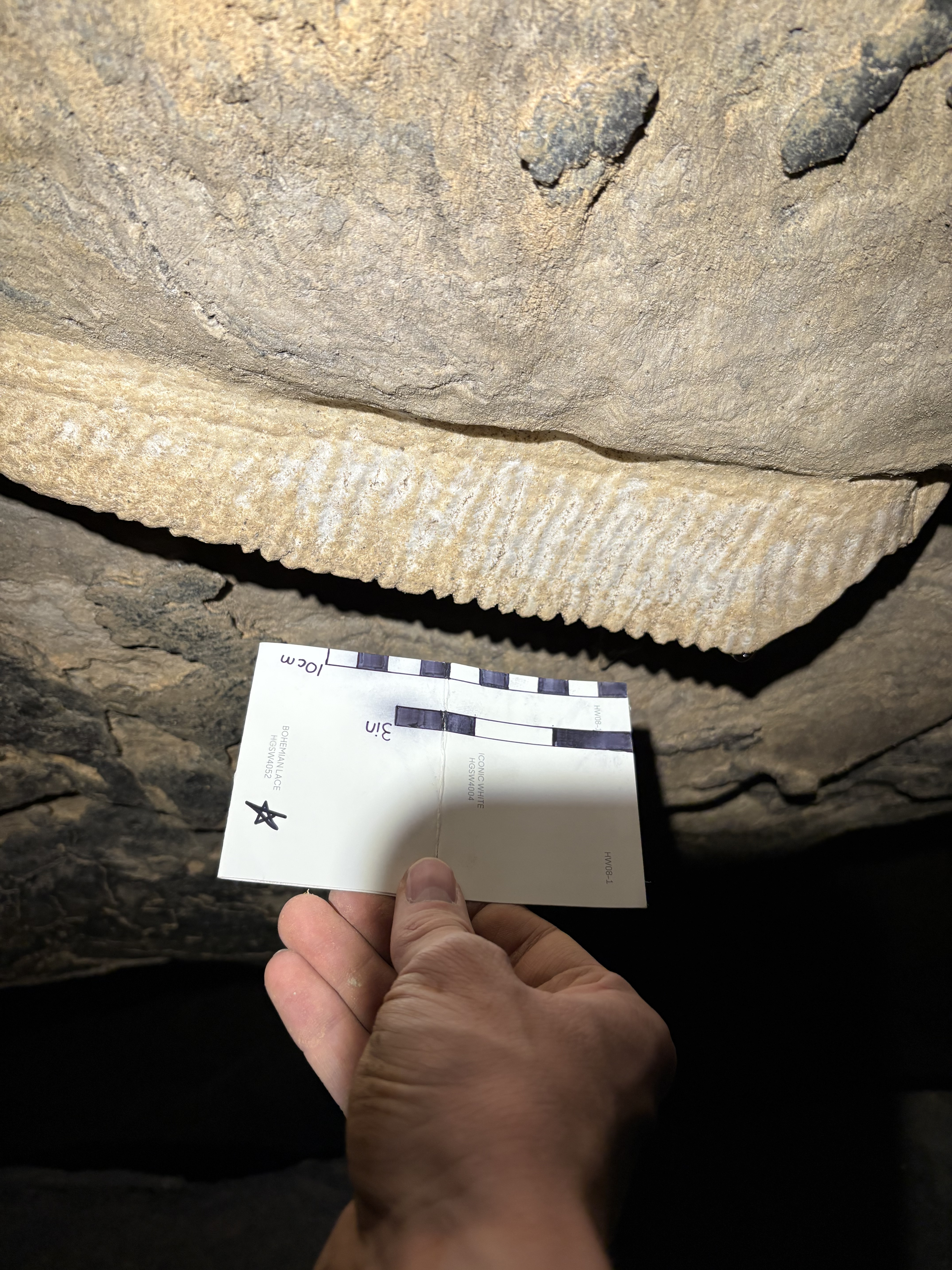
Drapery with sawtooth pattern from Bristol Caverns, Tennessee. 10 centimetres (3.9 in) scale shown.

Though flowstones are among the largest of speleothems, they can still be damaged by a single touch. The oil from human fingers causes the flowing water to avoid the area, which then dries out. Flowstones are also good identifiers of periods of past droughts, since they need some form of water to develop; the lack of that water for long periods of time can leave traces in the rock record via the absence or presence of flowstones, and their detailed structure.

=== Concrete derived flowstone ===
Flowstone derived from concrete, lime or mortar, can form on manmade structures, much more rapidly than in the natural cave environment due to the different chemistry involved. On concrete structures, these secondary deposits are the result of concrete degradation, when calcium ions have been leached from the concrete in solution and redeposited on the structure's surface to form flowstone, stalactites and stalagmites. Carbon dioxide (CO_{2}) is absorbed into the hyperalkaline leachate solution as it emerges from the concrete. This facilitates the chemical reactions which deposit calcium carbonate (CaCO_{3}) on vertical or sloping surfaces, in the form of flowstone.

Concrete derived secondary deposits are classified as "calthemites". These calcium carbonate deposits mimic the forms and shapes of speleothems, created in caves. e.g. stalagmites, stalactites, flowstone etc. It is most likely that calthemite flowstone is precipitated from leachate solution as calcite, "in preference to the other, less stable polymorphs, aragonite and vaterite."

Other trace elements such as iron from rusting reinforcing or copper oxide from pipework may be transported by the leachate and deposited at the same time as the CaCO_{3}. This may cause the calthemites to take on colours of the leached oxides.

== Uses ==
Cave onyx is any of various kinds of flowstone considered desirable for ornamental architectural purposes. "Cave onyx" was a common term in certain areas of the United States—particularly the Tennessee-Alabama-Georgia area and the Ozarks—during the 19th and early 20th centuries, being applied to calcite speleothems that were banded in a way suggestive of true onyx.

There are a number of US caves called "Onyx Cave" because of the presence in them of such deposits.

== Gallery ==
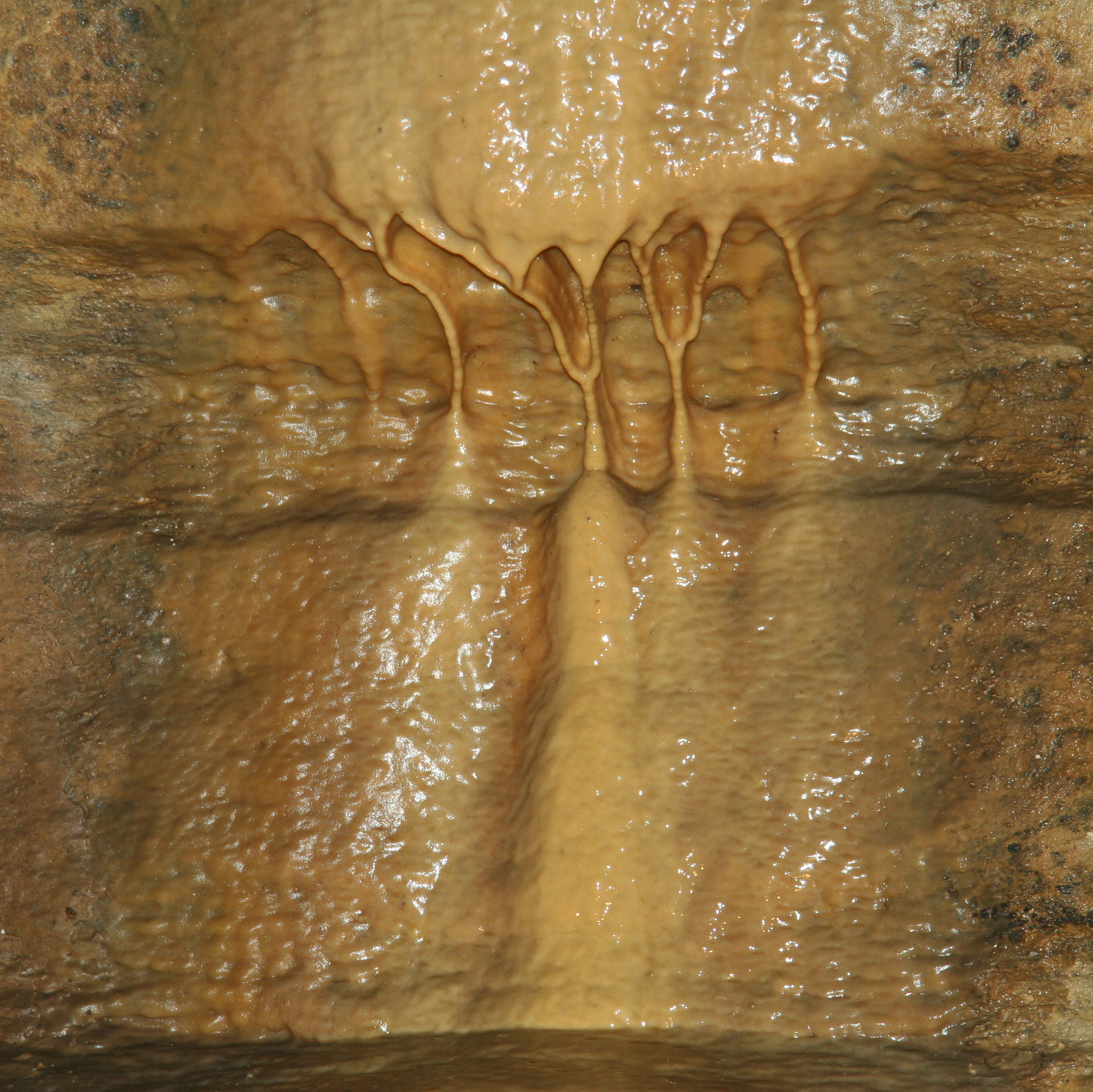
Flowstone in Mystery Cave, Minnesota

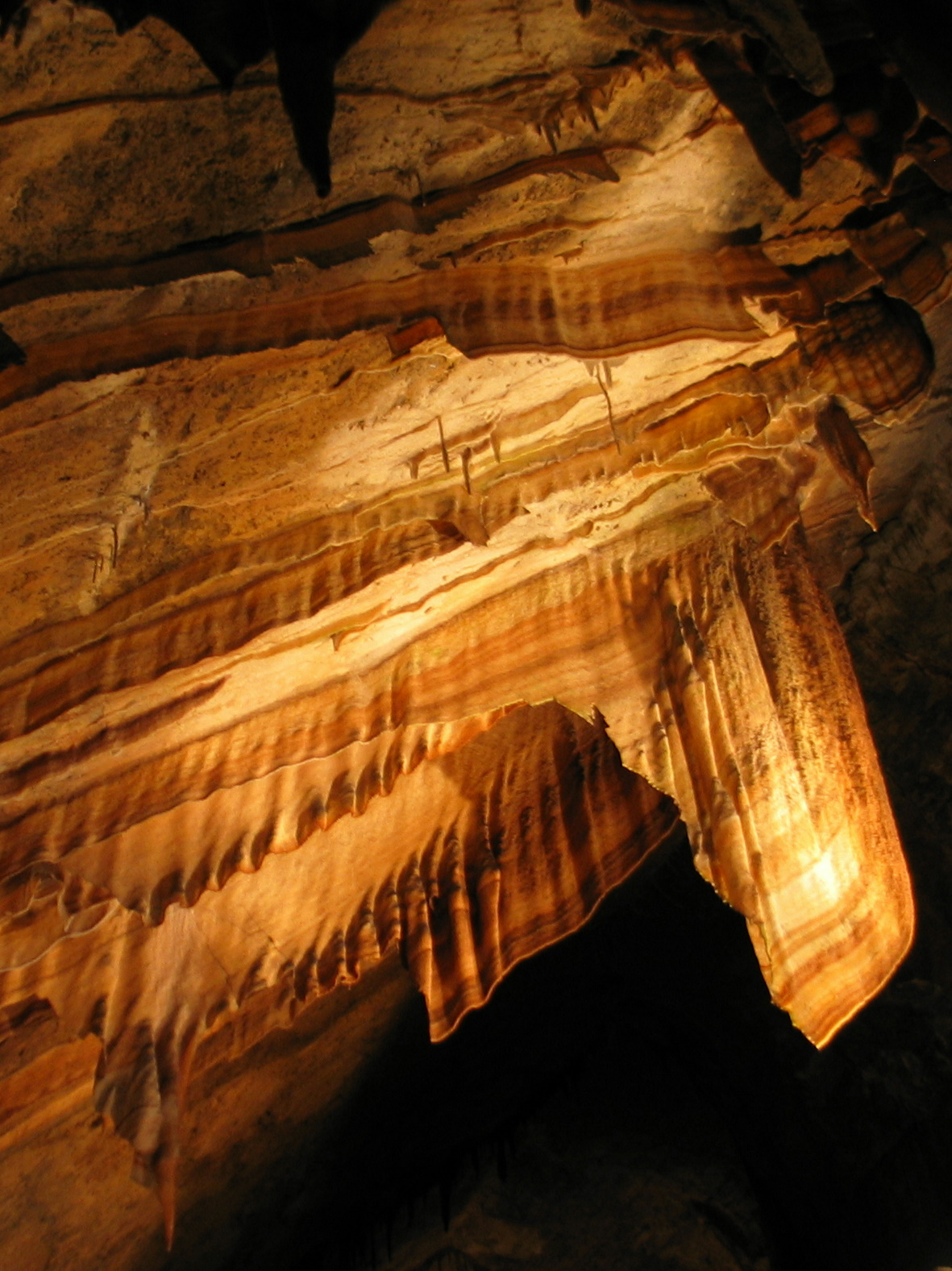
Flowstone on the ceiling at Gunns Plains Cave, Tasmania

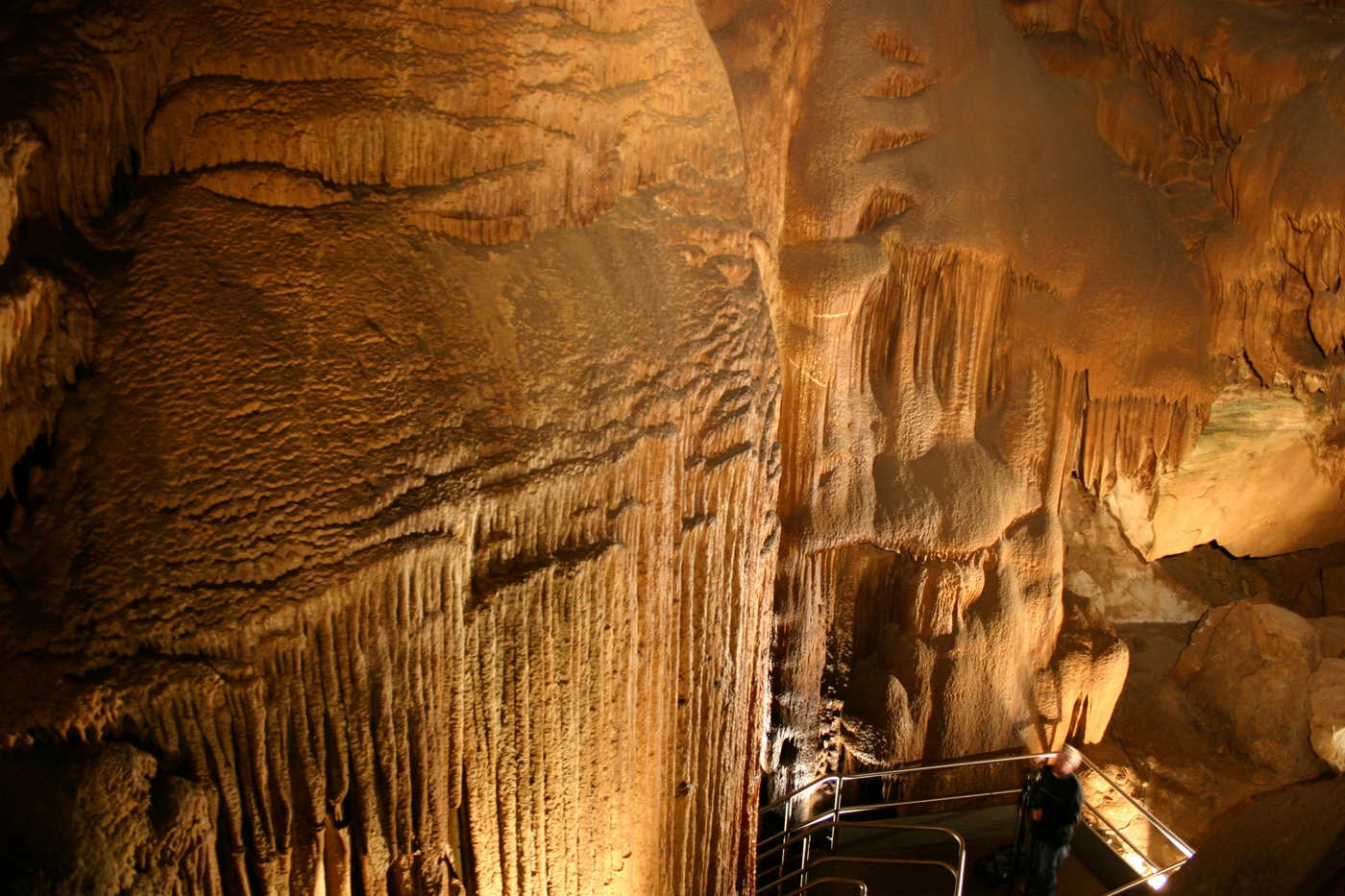
Travertine Frozen Niagara flowstone formation in Mammoth Cave, KY, USA

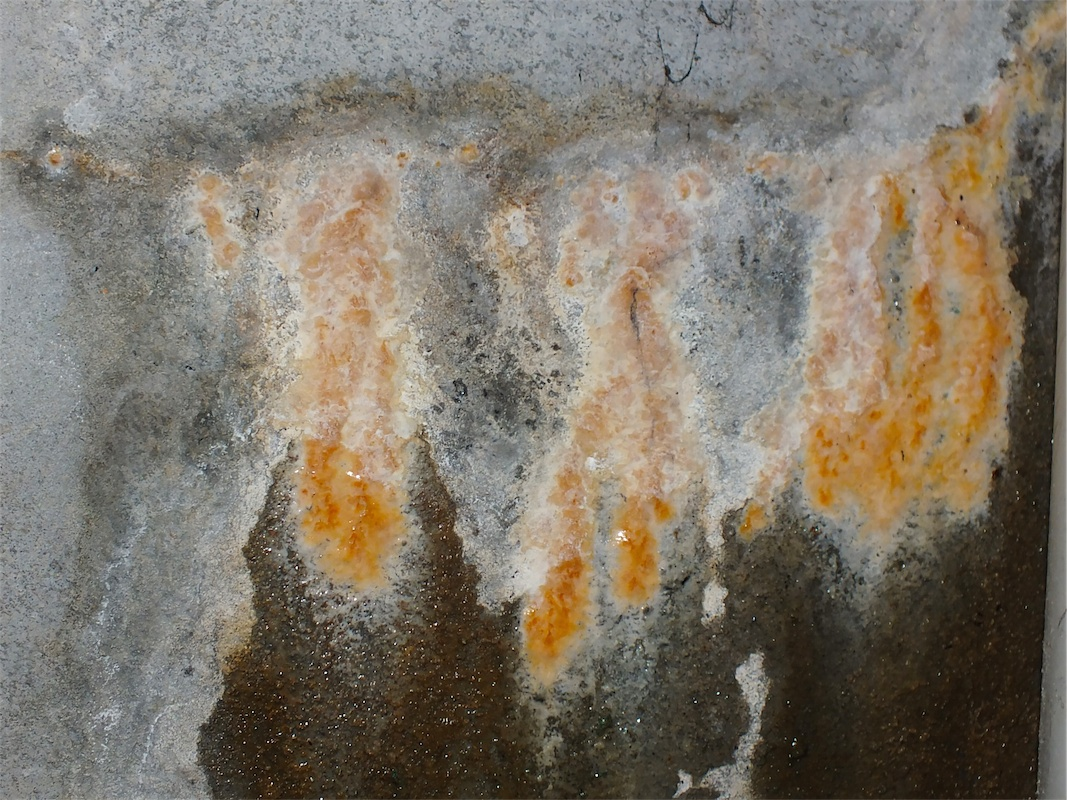
Calthemite flowstone on concrete wall, colored by iron oxide deposited with the CaCO_{3}. A sign of concrete degradation.

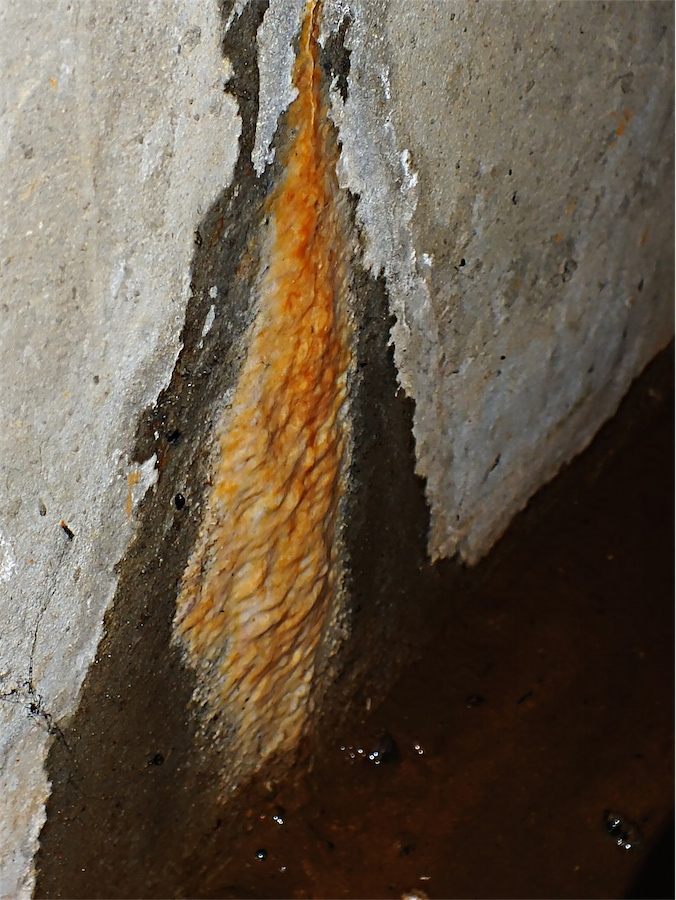
Calthemite flowstone on concrete wall.
