= 2012 Paris Motor Show =

International auto show

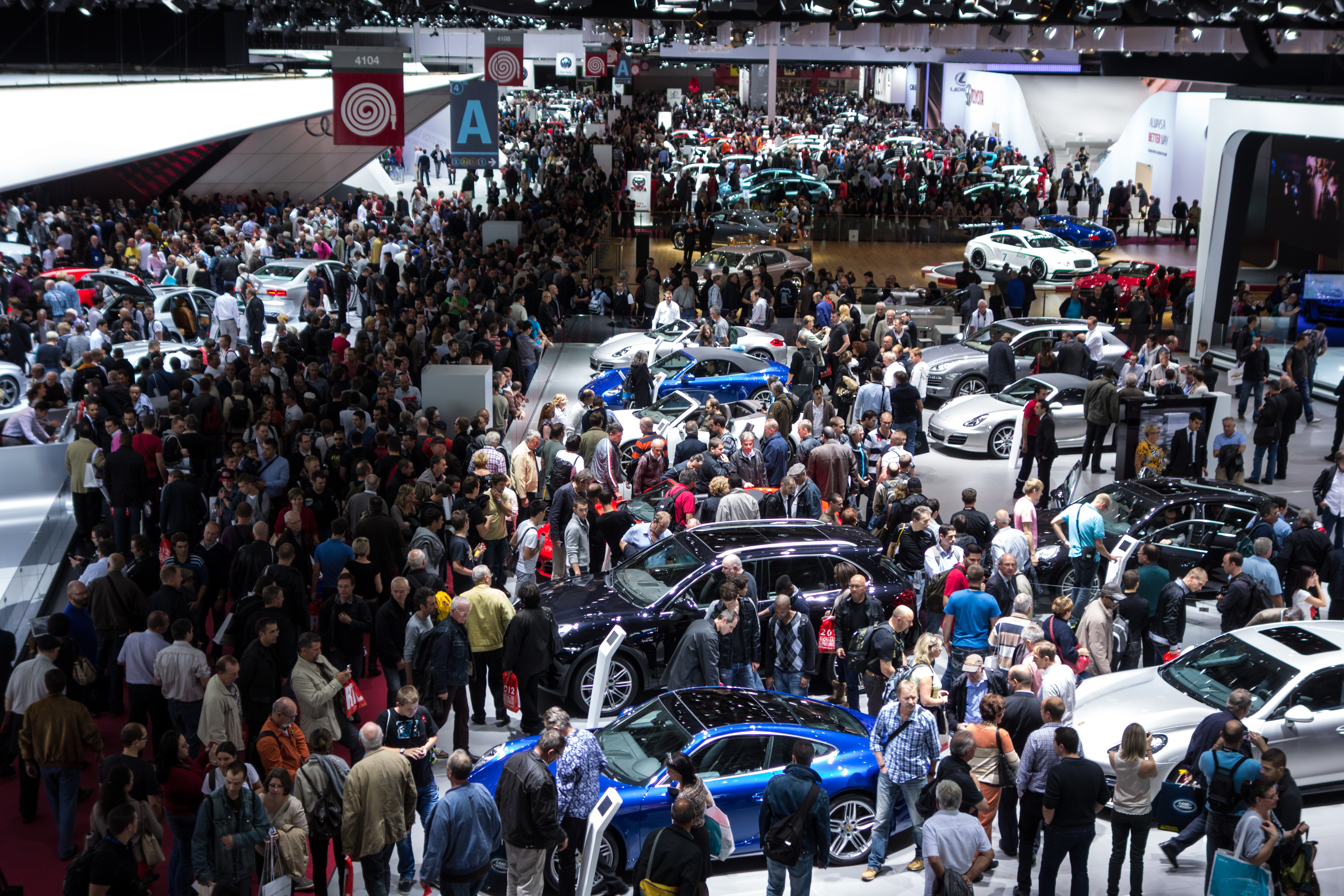
- 2012 Paris Motor Show with Porsche exhibit stand in the foreground
- Genre: Auto show
- Begins: September 29, 2012
- Ends: October 14, 2012
- Venue: Paris Expo Porte de Versailles
- Location: Paris
- Country: France
- Previous event: 2010 Paris Motor Show
- Next event: 2014 Paris Motor Show

The Mondial de l'Automobile de Paris 2012, known in English as the 2012 Paris Motor Show, took place from 29 September to 14 October 2012 at Paris Expo.

== Introductions ==
=== Production cars ===
- Audi A3 Sportback
- Audi RS5 Cabriolet
- BMW 1 Series 3DR
- BMW 3 Series Touring
- Chevrolet Trax
- Citroën C3 Picasso facelift
- Citroën DS3 convertible
- Fiat 500X
- Fisker Karma Surf
- Ford Mondeo MkV
- Ford Tourneo Connect
- Hyundai i30 3DR
- Hyundai ix35 Fuel Cell
- Jaguar F-Type
- Kia Carens
- Lexus LS facelift
- Maserati GranTurismo Convertible MC
- Mazda6 Wagon
- Mercedes-Benz A45 AMG
- Mercedes-Benz CLS63 AMG Shooting Brake
- Mercedes-Benz SLS AMG Electric Drive
- Mini Paceman
- Mitsubishi Outlander P-HEV
- Opel Adam
- Peugeot 301
- Porsche 911 (991) Carrera 4/4S
- Range Rover (L405)
- Volkswagen Golf VII, GTI, BlueMotion
- Volvo V40 Cross Country, RDesign
- Ferrari F12 Berlinetta
- Ferrari 458 Italia

=== Concept cars ===
- Audi Crosslane Coupé
- Audi SQ5 TDI concept
- Bentley Continental GT3 race car
- BMW Concept Active Tourer
- Lexus LF-CC
- McLaren P1 pre-production concept
- Nissan Terra
- Peugeot Onyx
- Porsche Panamera Sport Turismo
- smart forstars
- Suzuki S-Cross Concept

=== Motorsport cars ===
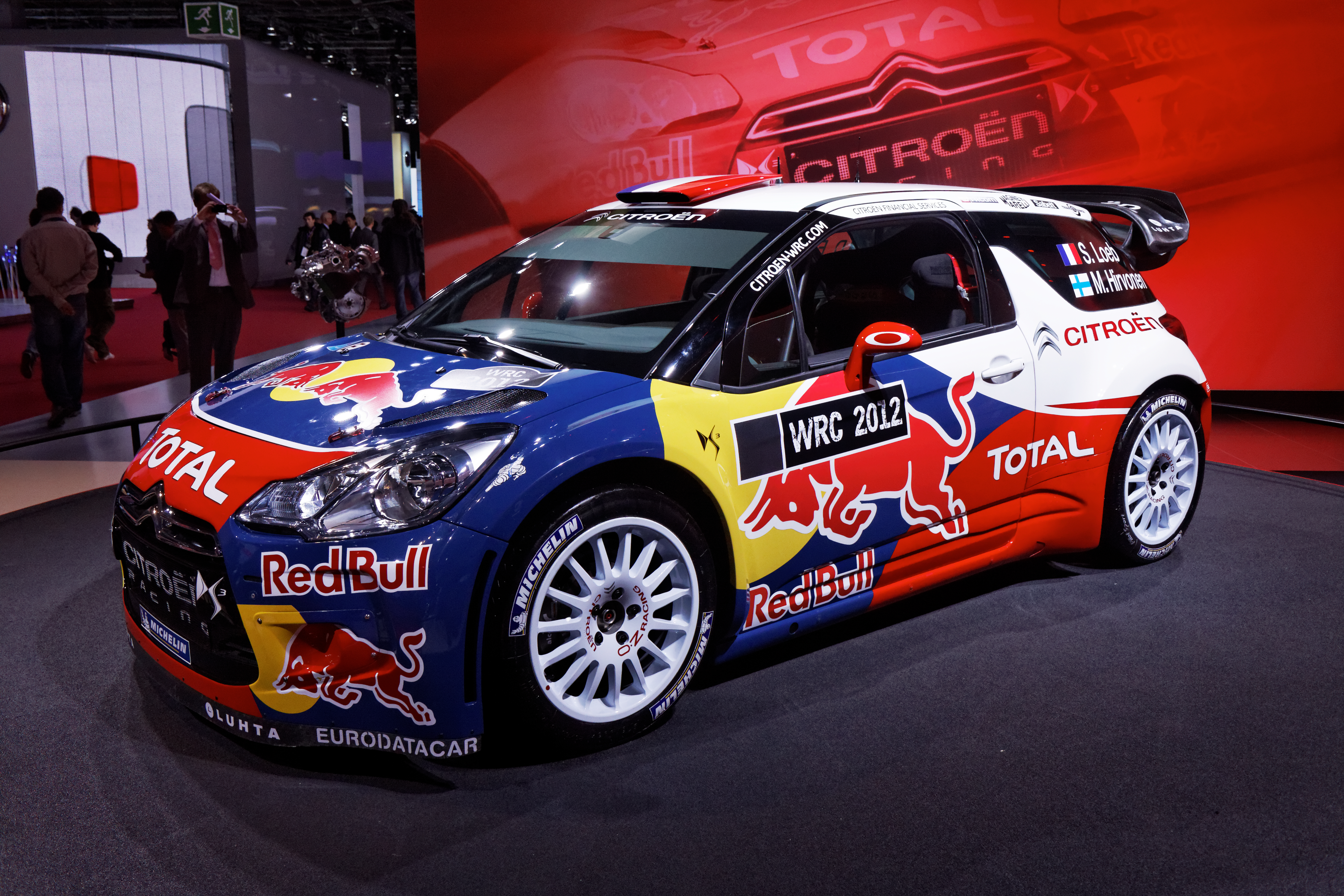
Citroën DS3 WRC at Paris 2012

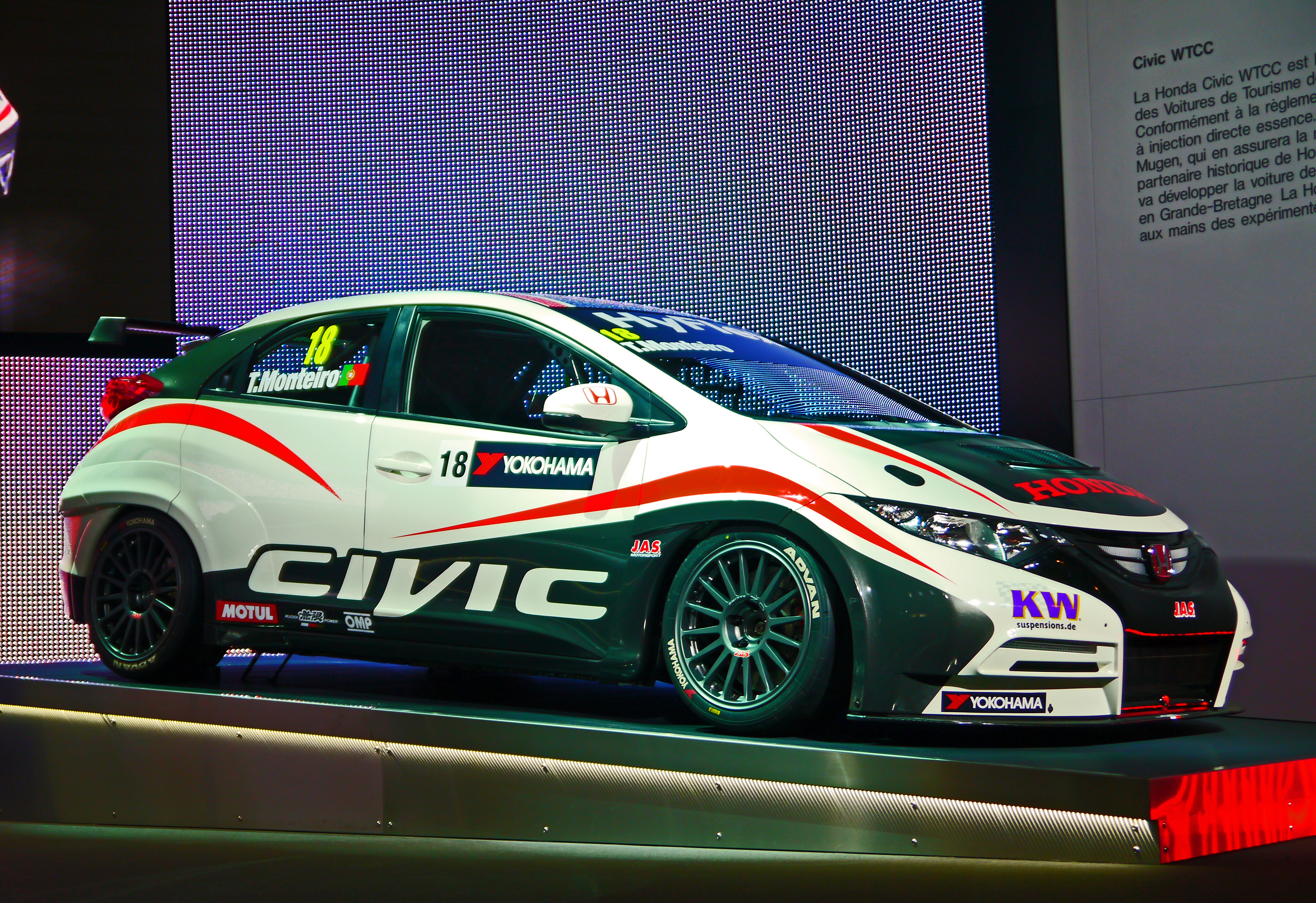
Honda Civic WTCC

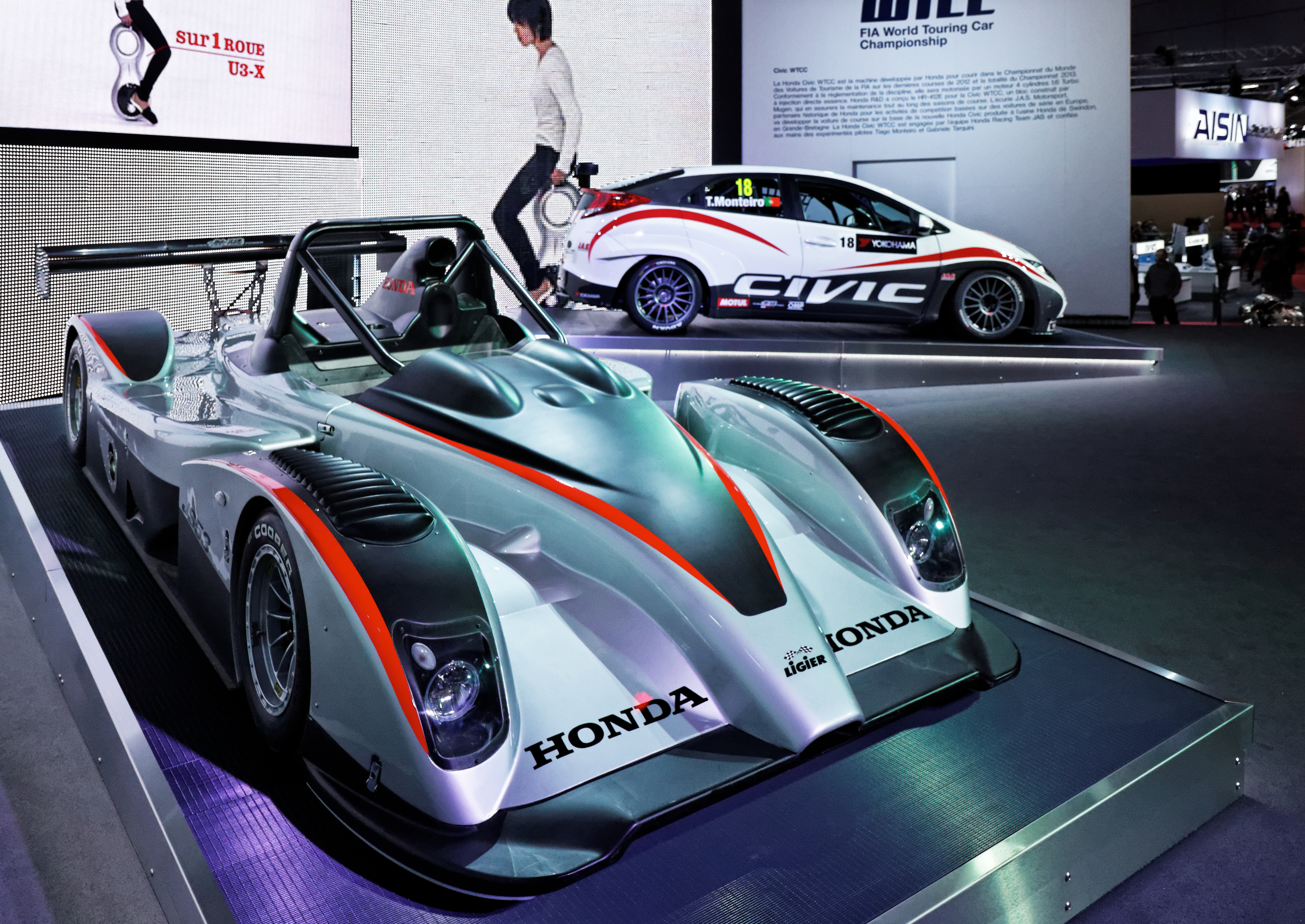
Honda Civic WTCC

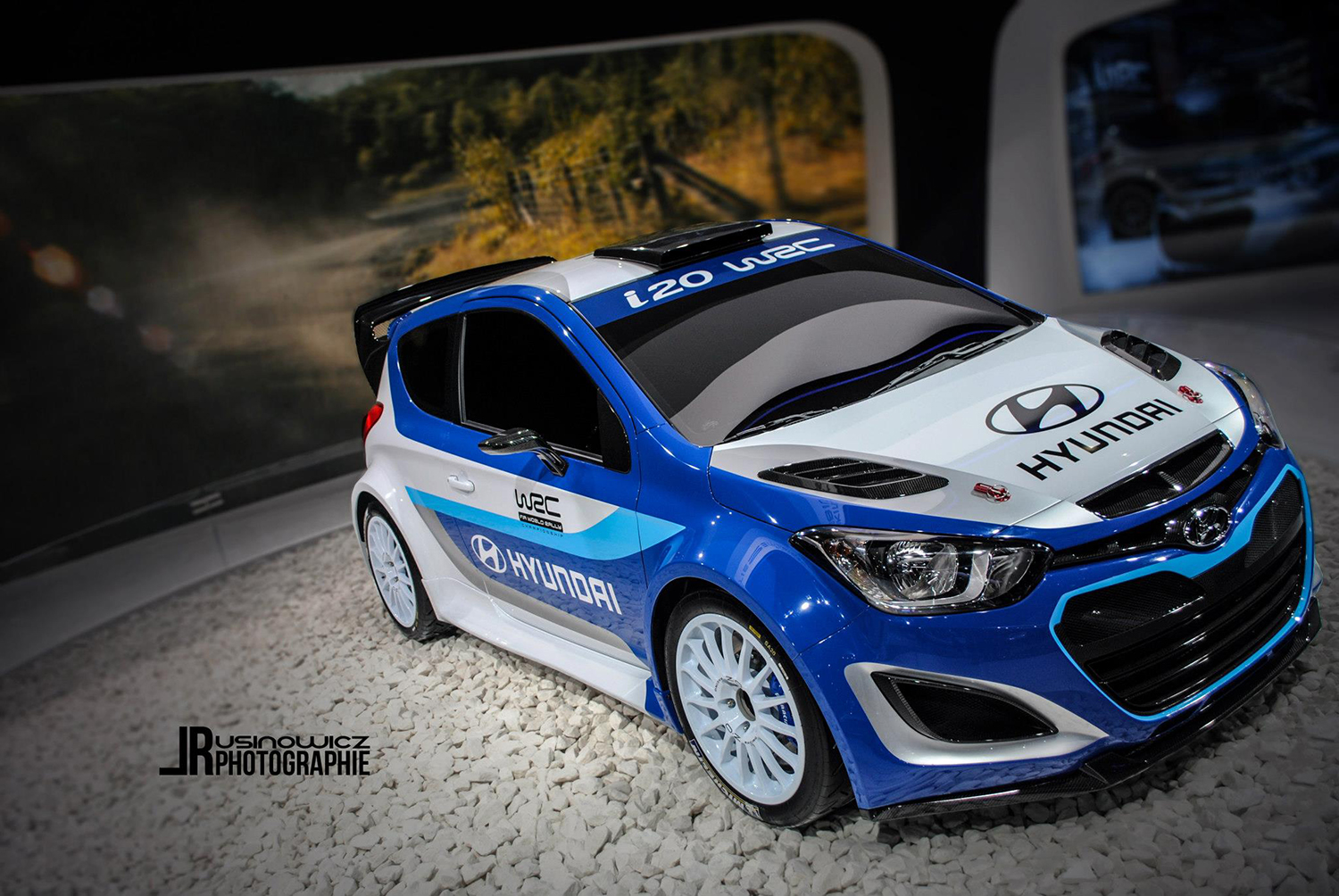
Hyundai i20 WRC at Paris 2012

- Citroën DS3 WRC
- Honda Civic WTCC (European Debut)
- Honda Ligier Martini JS 53 (Sport-Prototype)
- Hyundai i20 WRC (European Debut)

Ferrari teased the successor to the Enzo by showing just the bare-bones skeleton of the new car. It will be a hybrid and will be revealed in 2013.

== See also ==
- Paris Motor Show
