= Onix =

Onix may refer to:

- ONIX (publishing protocol), XML metadata formats for book publishers
- Onix (Pokémon), a fictional species in the Pokémon franchise
- Chevrolet Onix, a subcompact car
- Onix, a synonym of the legume genus Astragalus

== People ==
- Onix Cortés (born 1988), judoka from Cuba
- Onix Concepción (born 1957), Puerto Rican Major League Baseball shortstop

== See also ==
- Onyx (disambiguation)
- P-800 Oniks, a Russian/Soviet supersonic anti-ship cruise missile
