= Drapery (cave formation) =

Type of cave formation

Cave bacon formation in Crystal Grottoes caverns

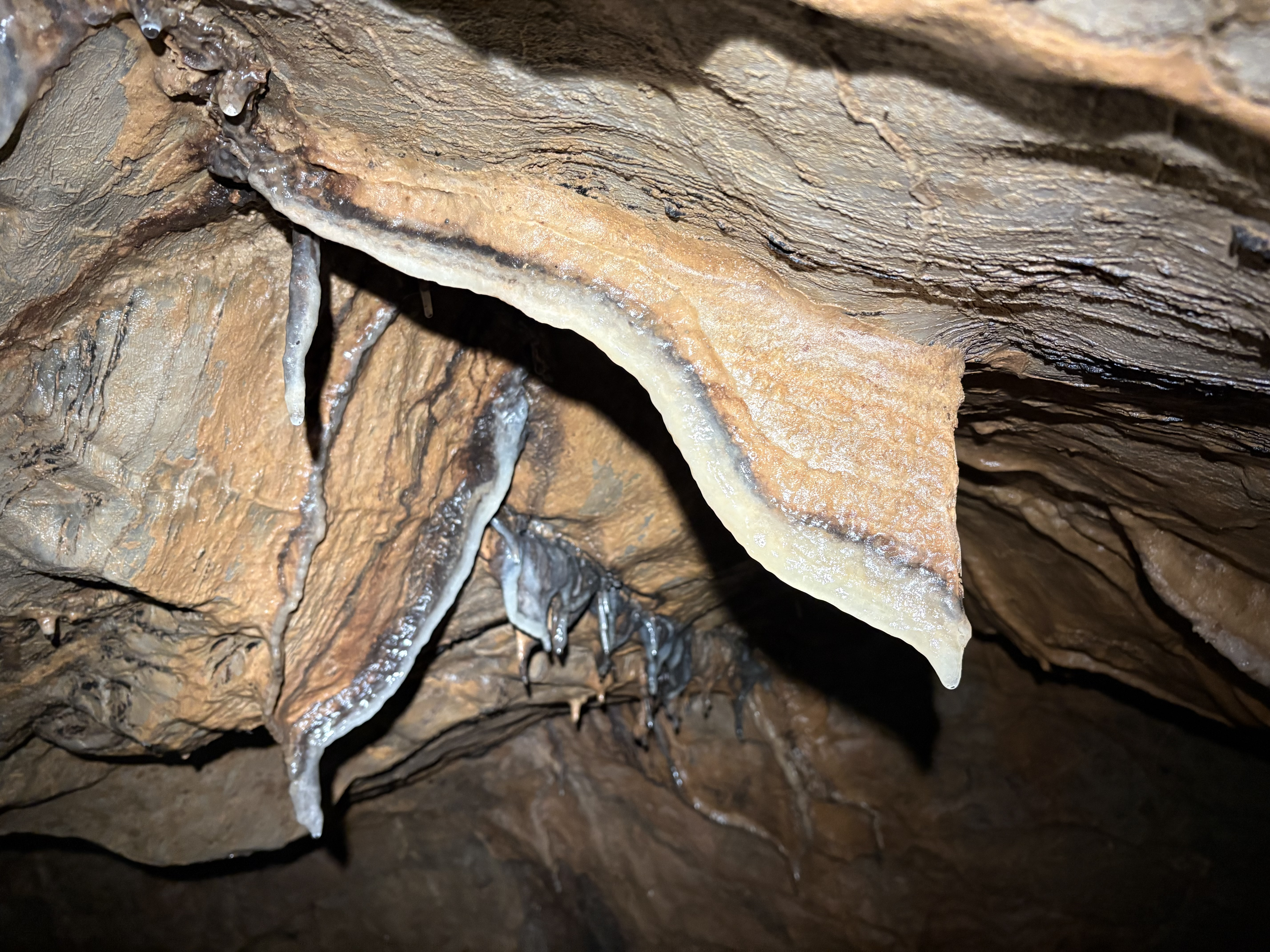
A drapery with an odd coloration, Bristol Caverns, TN

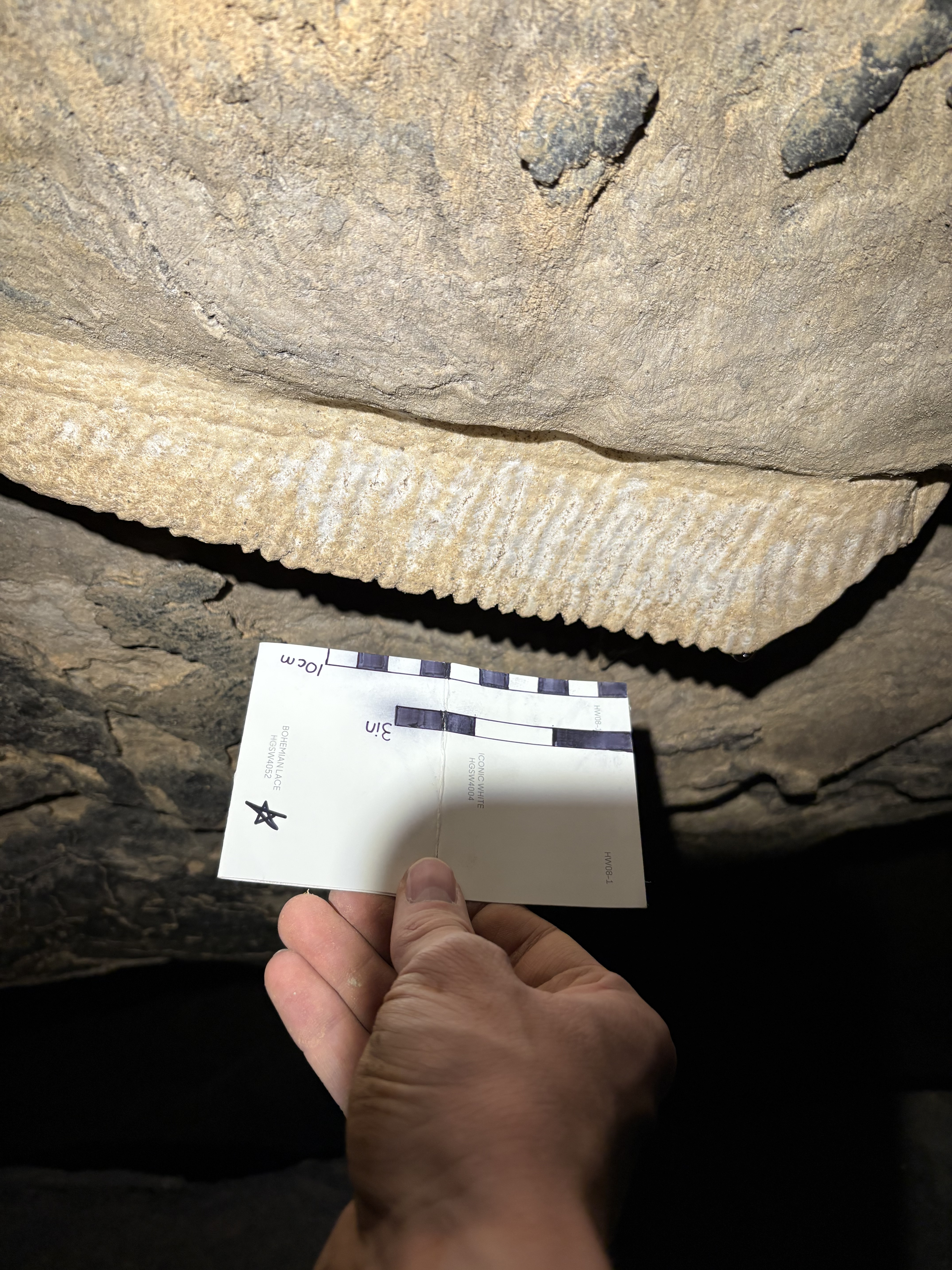
Cave bacon with sawtooth pattern, shown with a 10 centimetres (3.9 in) scale. Bristol Caverns, TN

A drapery, also called a cave curtain or cave bacon, is a composite cave formation, a variety of flowstone and dripstone. These speleothems are formed when a rivulet of water repeatedly flows down one path on a sloped ceiling or wall in a cave. As the curtain extends away from the wall, water begins to drip from the bottom-most point on the formation, creating a small stalactite.

The sawtooth pattern seen on many draperies is due to the trigonal crystal structure of calcite, meaning that when they stack, a microscopic pattern of offset crystals is created. This pattern repeats and eventually becomes macroscopic. The waving pattern that gives this formation its name comes from water flowing over the outside of the formation unevenly, thus changing the direction of the growing edge.
