= Onyx (architectural collective) =

Architectural collective from New York

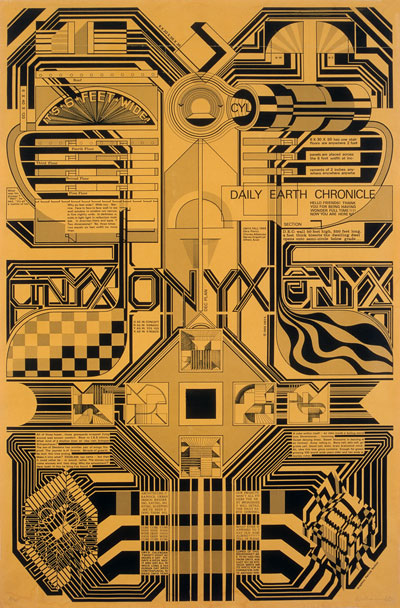
- The first ONYX broadsheet showed projects in development by the group in the late 1960s
- Occupation: Architect
- Design: Offset-printed posters or "broadsheets" that were mailed internationally

Onyx is a multi-member collective that was active in New York City from 1968 through the early 1970s and active intermittently to the present. Its members - Ron Williams, Woody Rainey, Tommy Simpson, Mike Hinge, Bob Buxbaum, Davis Allen, Sheridan Bell and Jack Wells among others—published architectural projects in the form of offset-printed posters or "broadsheets" that were mailed internationally. The members also went by a number of pseudonyms including Charles Albatross, Okra Plantz, Patrick Redson and Harvey Grapefruit. The poster format allowed the rapid reproduction and easy circulation of their ideas. While the collective distributed their posters through the postal service they also pasted the posters up throughout the streets of the city. There are many connections to the "mail art" phenomenon; the collective claimed affiliation with this artistic practice through the labeling of mailings as MAIL ART and interaction with others practicing this form, including Ant Farm, and Ray Johnson. Characterized by an intricate layering of text and images, the ONYX posters described speculative architectural projects, made allusions to architectural history, explored practices of architectural representation, and commented obscurely on current sociopolitical events.

The moniker ONYX was selected in reference to the multilayered stone. According to Williams, “There were many descriptions of what ONYX meant but largely it was an attempt to bring different sensibilities together and to resist the temptation to declare a manifesto."

In the mid 1960s, Ron Williams and Woody Rainey began to create posters to document their conversations on architecture and communicate their experiences in New York to their friends who shared their interests in art and architecture. The two met while studying architecture at the University of Utah, and worked in the early years of ONYX as designers/architects in the offices of Pei Cobb Freed, Richard Meier, Peter Blake and James Baker, Skidmore, Owings & Merrill, and Russo+Sonder. Both went on to careers in design and architecture with separate private practices. They each won the New York Architectural League's Birch Burdette Long prize for architectural drawings and went on to teach architectural drawing at Columbia University.

Williams met Onyx-member Mike Hinge at the design office of Donald Deskey Associates in the mid 1960s where they designed exhibits for the USIS. Hailing from New Zealand, Hinge had a prolific career as a graphic designer, art director, and typographer, with an avid interest in illustrating science fiction publications. Hinge's work was included in various advertising annual publications and science fiction anthologies.

Tommy Simpson is a professional artist, continuing to work and exhibit.

Stewart Brand's Whole Earth Catalog included a review of a book by Williams and multiple reviews contributed by ONYX in its various supplements. The collective's work was also featured in Design Quarterly’s 1970 issue on "Conceptual Architecture", edited by John Margolies, and Jim Burns's book Arthropods (1972).

Onyx's posters are in the permanent collection of the Frac Centre.
