= Onyx Cave =

Onyx Cave may refer to several things in the United States:

- Onyx Cave (Arizona), a National Natural Landmark
- Onyx Cave (Arkansas), a small show cave
- Onyx Cave (Kentucky), a show cave
- Great Onyx Cave, Kentucky
  - Great Onyx Cave Entrance, Mammoth Cave, Kentucky, listed on the NRHP in Kentucky
- Crystal Onyx Cave, Kentucky
- Onyx Cave (Newburg, Missouri), listed on the NRHP in Missouri
- Onyx Mountain Caverns, Missouri

== See also ==
- Cave onyx
