= Peugeot Onyx =

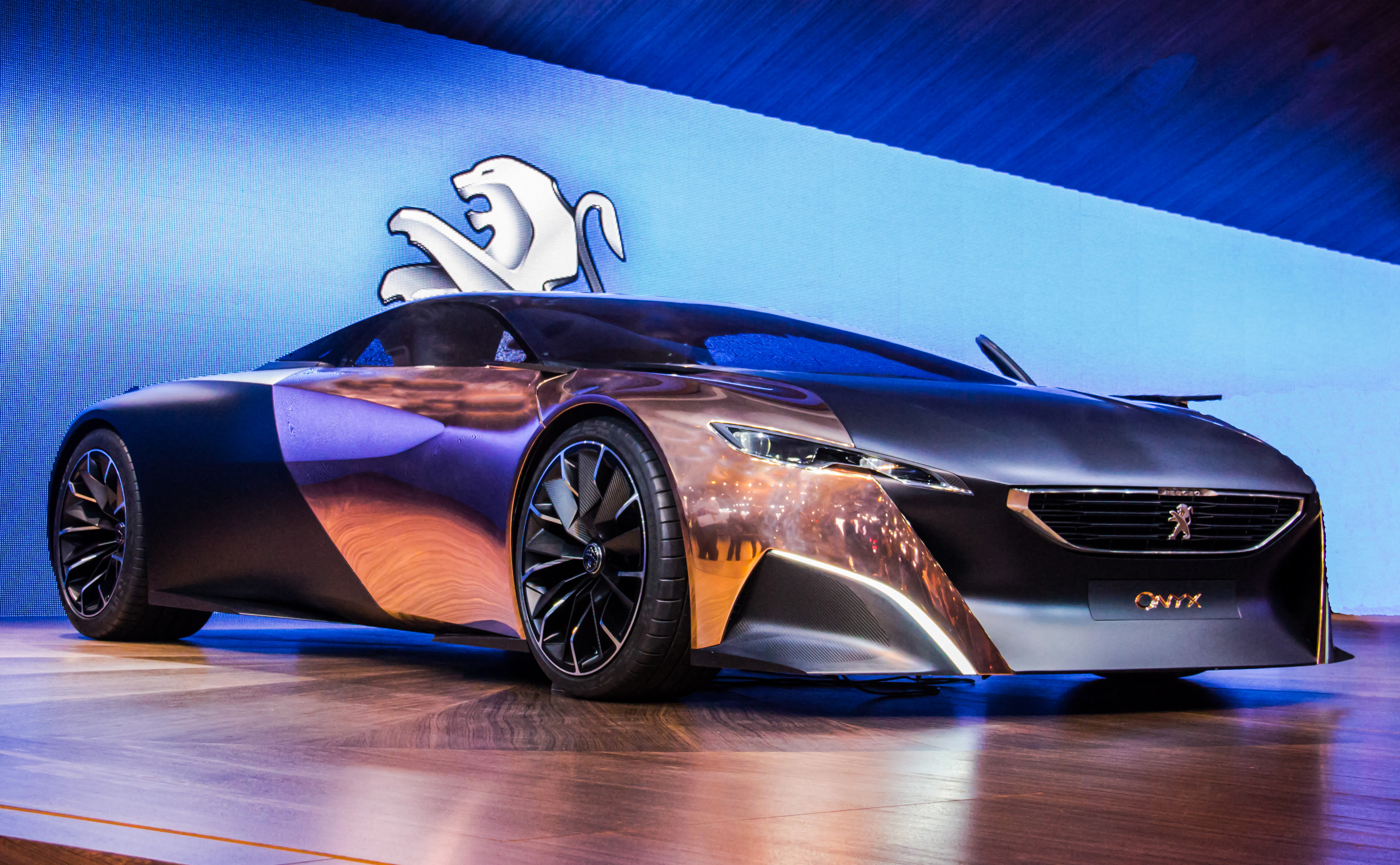

Overview
- Manufacturer: Peugeot
- Production: 2012
- Designer: Gilles Vidal

Body and chassis
- Class: Concept car
- Body style: 2-door coupé
- Layout: Mid-engined, rear-wheel drive
- Doors: Scissor doors

Powertrain
- Engine: 3.7 L (230 cu in) Peugeot 'HDi FAP' V8 twin-turbo (Diesel)
- Electric motor: 80hp Synchronous with permanent magnets electric motor
- Transmission: 6-speed sequential manual
- Battery: Lithium-ion battery

Dimensions
- Length: 4,650 mm (183 in)
- Width: 2,200 mm (87 in)
- Height: 1,130 mm (44 in)
- Curb weight: 1,100 kg (2,425 lb)

The Peugeot Onyx is a concept sports car produced by the French car manufacturer Peugeot and presented at the 2012 Paris Motor Show.

== Design and performance ==
=== Design ===
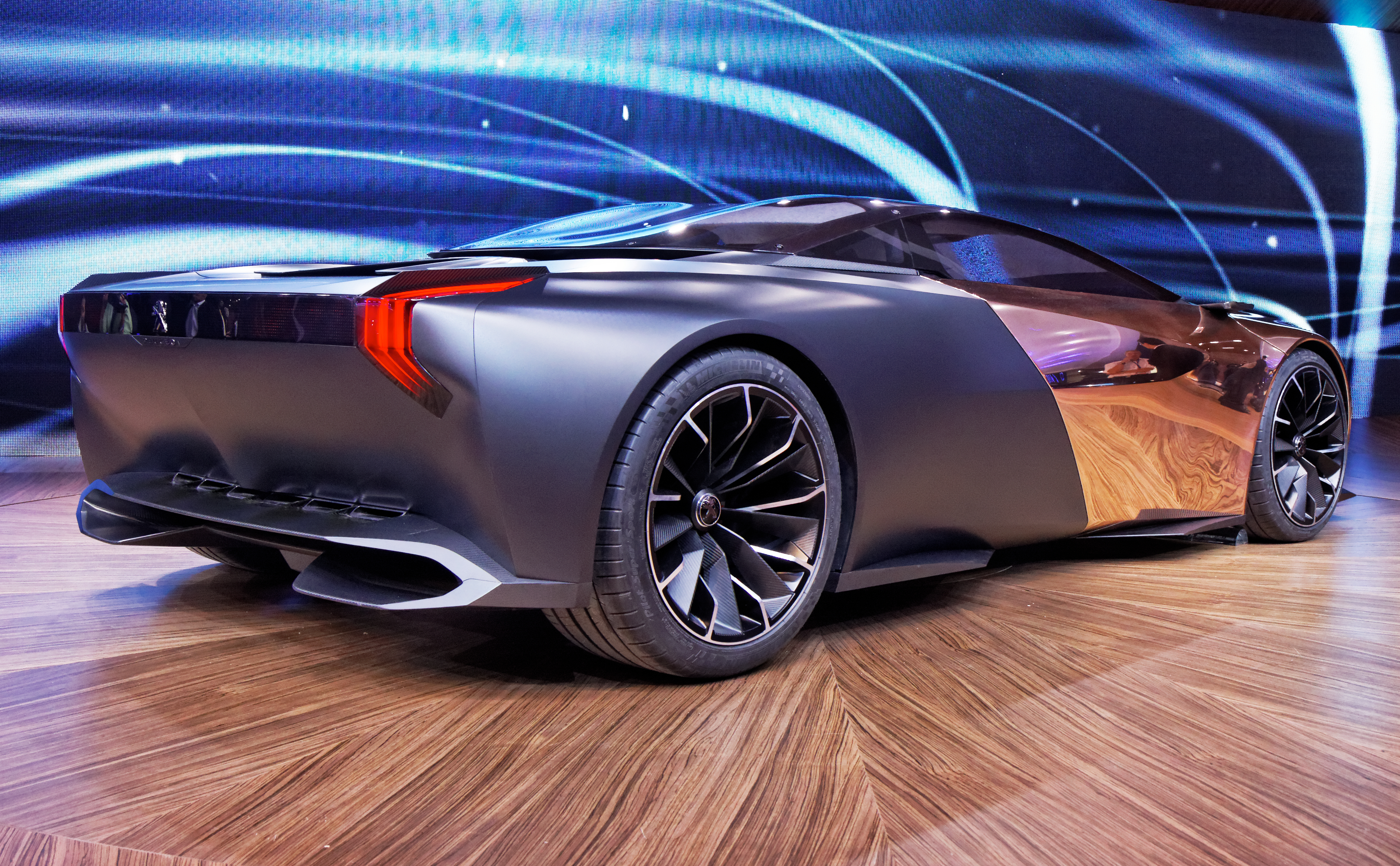
Rear view

Designed by Peugeot Design Center’s chief designer Gilles Vidal, the Onyx was intended to be a more eco friendly supercar, using a hybrid system and eco-friendly materials. The bodywork is hand-crafted, with some of the body panels hand beaten by a craftsman from a 0.8 mm thick sheet of untreated copper, while others are made of carbon fiber. The copper body panels were designed to oxidize from a mirror finish to a dull blue-green, and Peugeot displayed the car again 15 months later after the panels had oxidized. The body features a “double bubble” roof with aluminum roof arches that pays homage to the Peugeot RCZ, the taillights adopt the stylistic three-claw signature of the Peugeot lion, and the overall drag coefficient (Cd) of the car is 0.30.

=== Interior ===
The interior features eco-friendly materials, including recycled felt on the seats, and surfaces designed to look like wood but made from compressed newspapers mixed with resin to bind them together. Other materials include a center console made of blown crystal glass, aluminum toggle switches and climate controls, and carbon fiber for the structural elements.

=== Specifications ===
The chassis of the Onyx is made from carbon fiber, is claimed to be made of 12 individual parts and weighs 100 kg (220 lb). The suspension is double wishbone front and rear, also partially made from carbon fiber, with inboard springs and dampers. The concept also features a flat floor and active rear wing for aerodynamics. The Onyx is powered by a diesel Peugeot Sport V8 PSA HYbrid4-HDi-FAP 3.7 L Peugeot 908 engine from the 2011 24 Hours of Le Mans Prototype, with a cumulative 680 hp (600 + 80). This allows it to accelerate from 0-100 km/h (62 mph) in 2.9 seconds, and reach a claimed top speed of 223 mph (359 km/h).

== Gallery ==
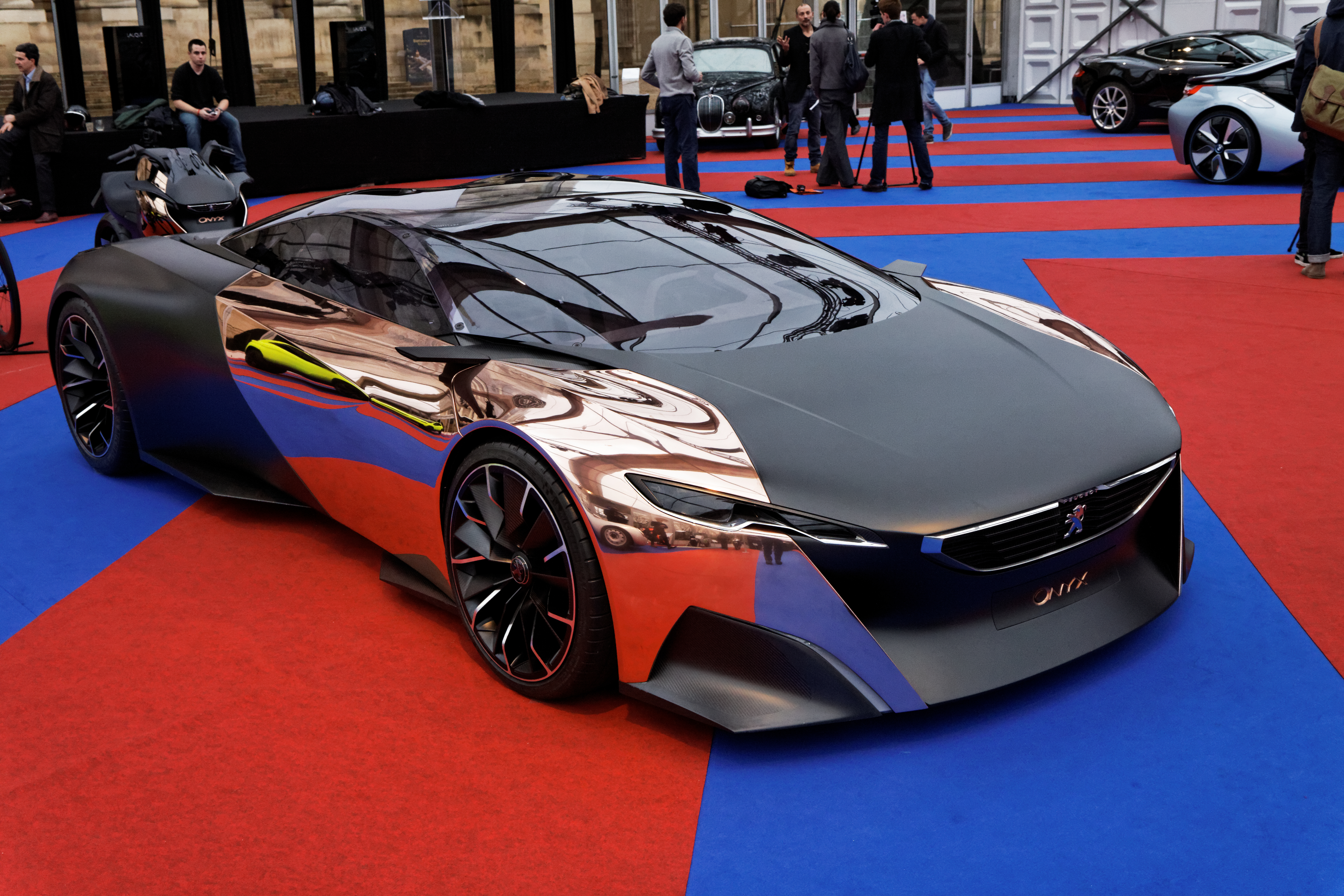
Peugeot Onyx at the 2013 Festival Automobile International

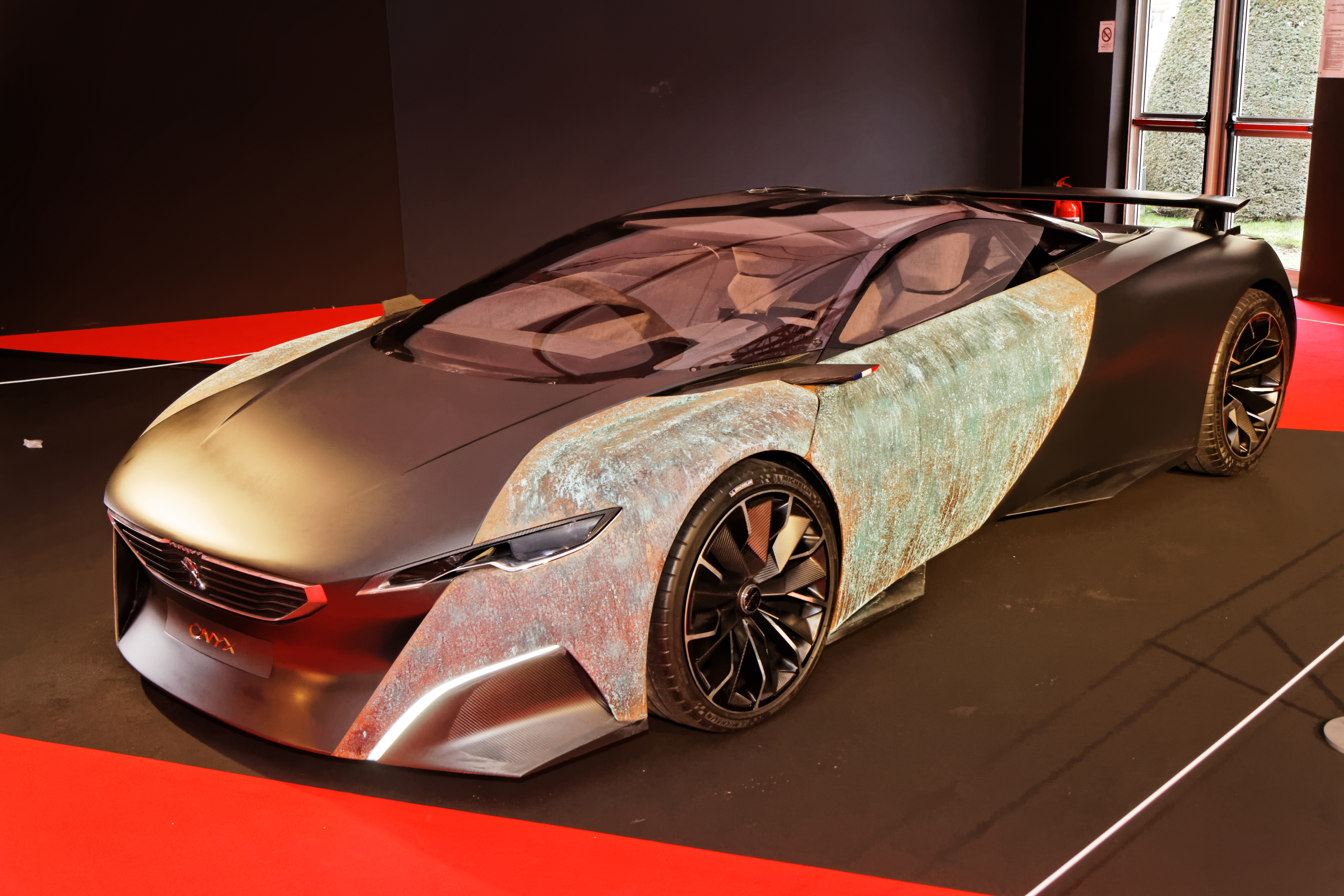
Peugeot Onyx at the 2014 Festival Automobile International, after the copper panels had oxidized

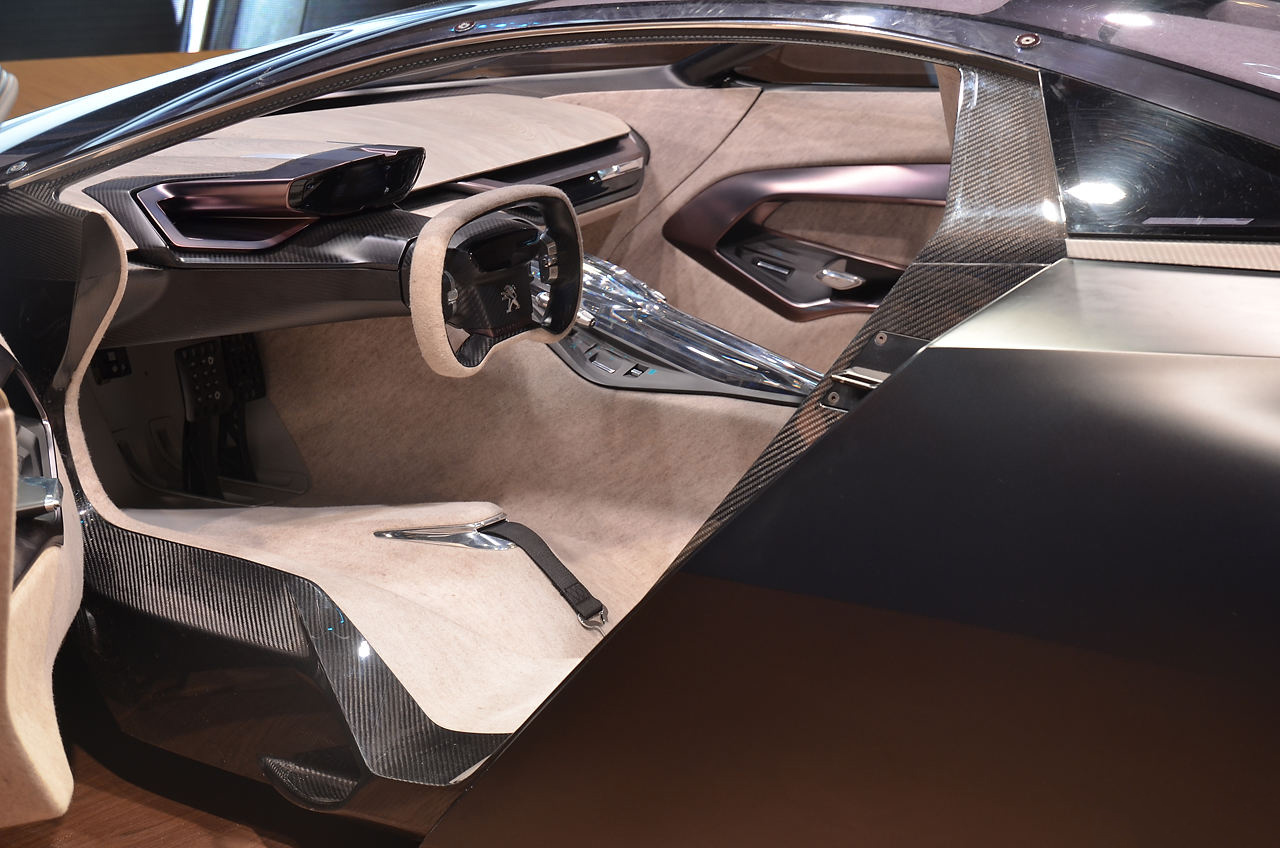
Interior

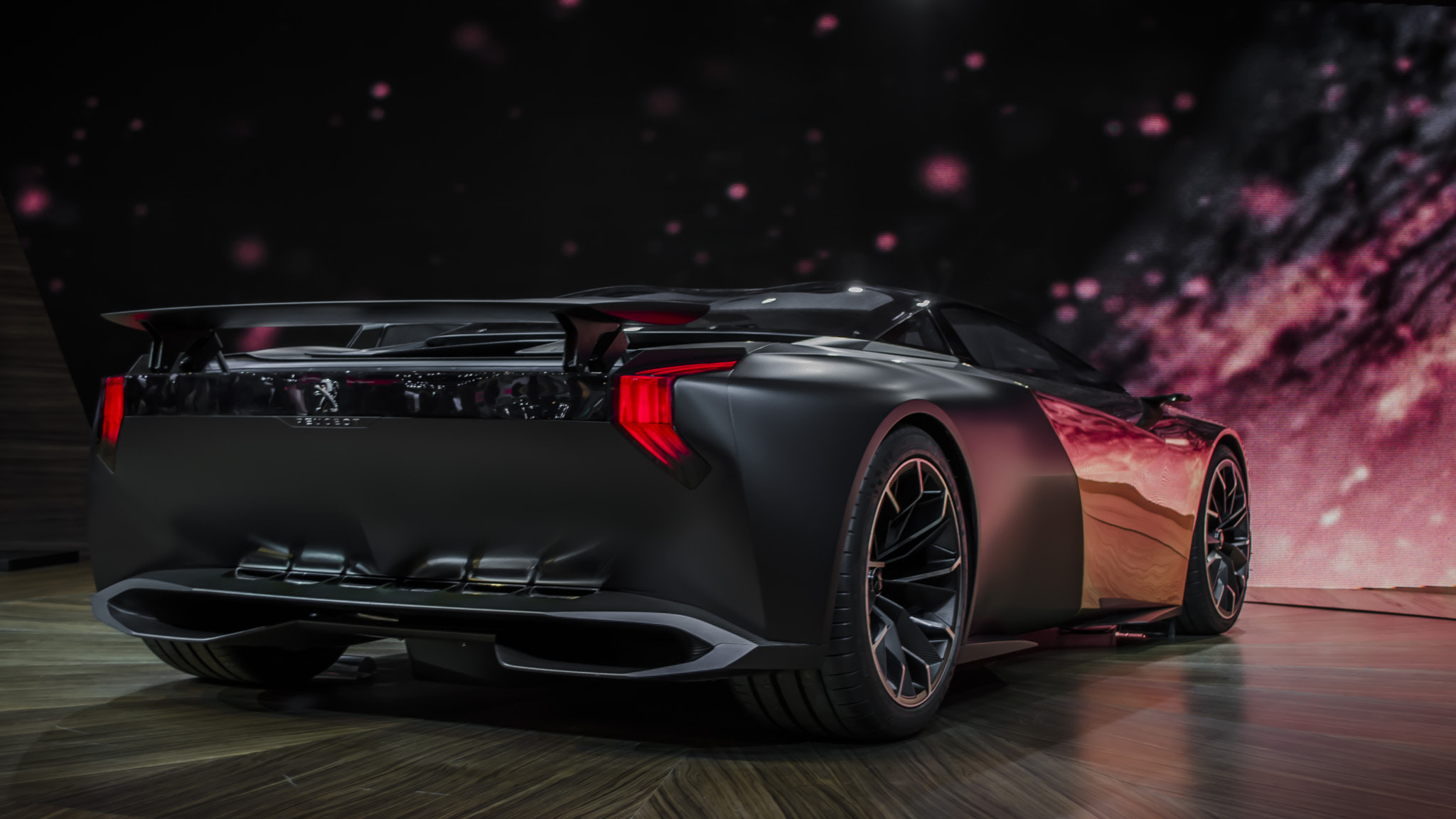
Rear with the active rear wing raised

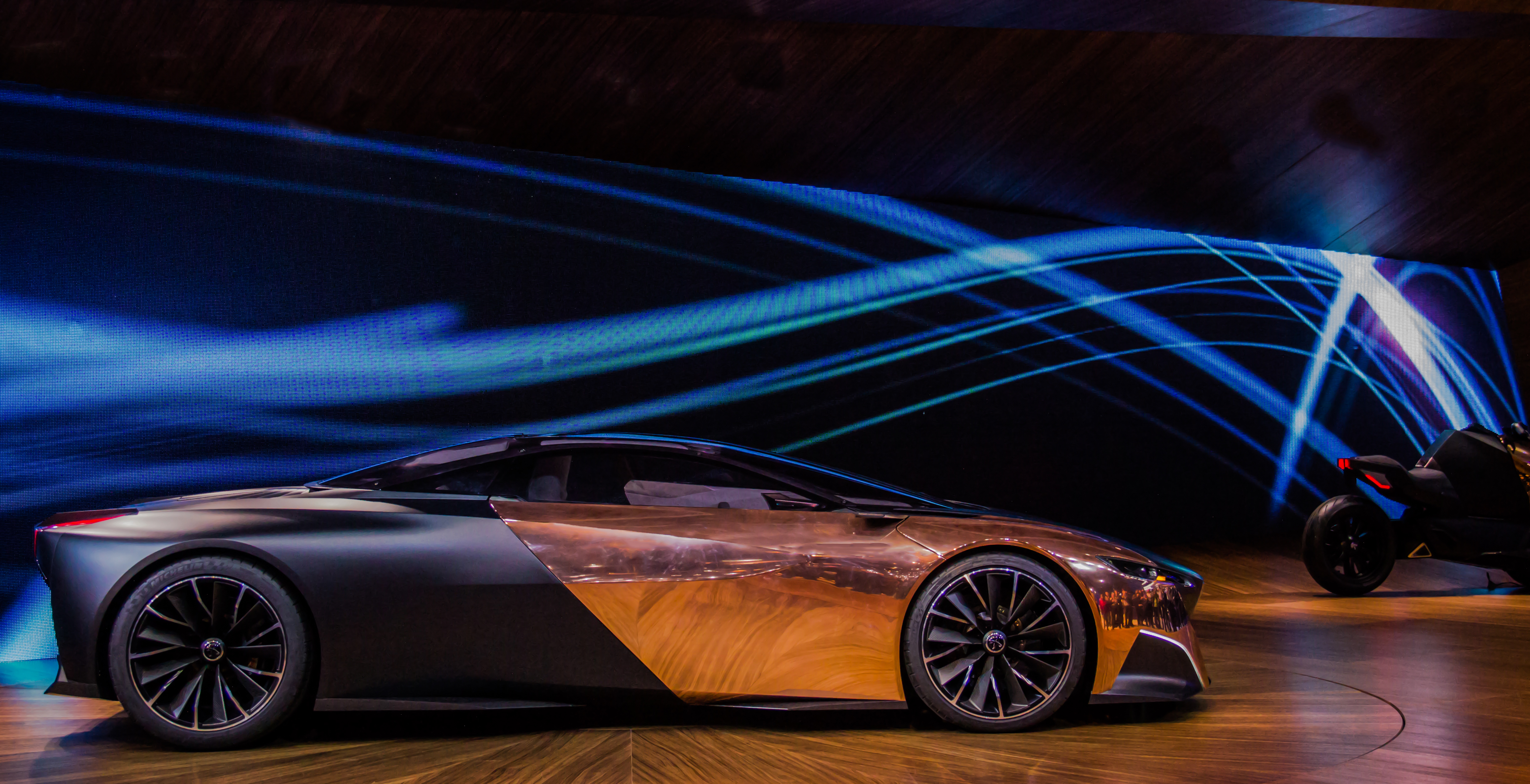
Side view
