= Khatunabad (disambiguation) =

Khatunabad is a city in Kerman Province, Iran.

Khatunabad (Persian: خاتون آباد or خاتون اباد) may also refer to:

- Khatunabad, Bostanabad, East Azerbaijan Province
- Khatunabad, Meyaneh, East Azerbaijan Province
- Khatunabad, Sarab, East Azerbaijan Province
- Khatunabad, Isfahan
- Khatunabad, Anbarabad, Kerman Province
- Khatunabad, Jiroft, Kerman Province
- Khatunabad, Dehaj, Shahr-e Babak County, Kerman Province
- Khatunabad-e Mohimi, Kerman Province
- Khatunabad, Lorestan
- Khatunabad, Qazvin
- Khatunabad, Razavi Khorasan
- Khatunabad, West Azerbaijan
- Khatunabad Rural District (disambiguation)
