= Khatunabad-e Humeh =

Khatunabad-e Humeh or Khatoon Abad Hoomeh (Persian: خاتون ابادحومه) may refer to:

- Khatunabad, Anbarabad
- Khatunabad-e Mohimi
