= Bishapur =

Ancient Sasanian capital in Iran

- Middle Persian: Vēh-Šābuhr or Bēšābūr; Persian: بیشاپور
- Bishâpûr
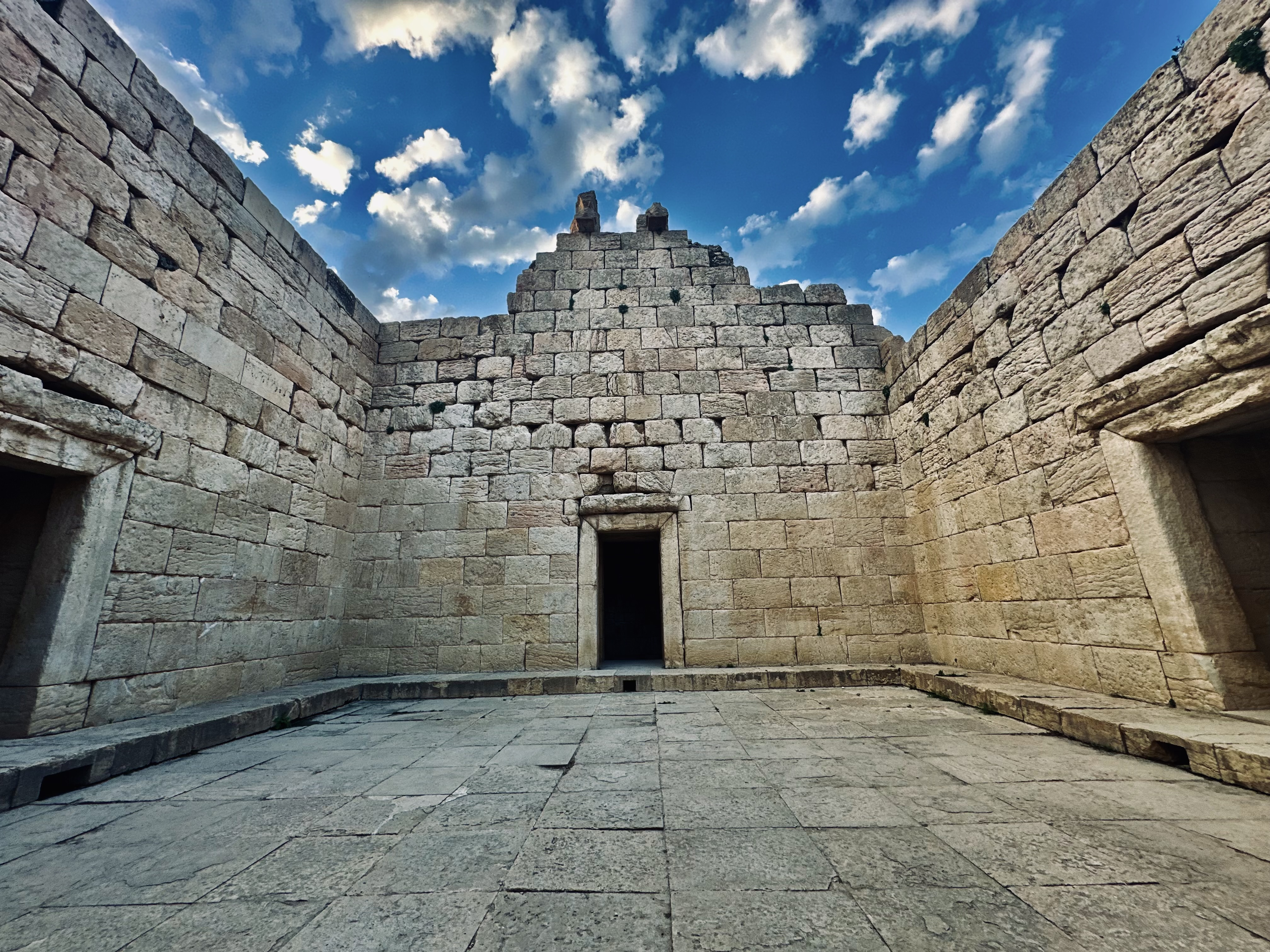
- Temple of Anahita, Bishapur

- Location within Iran Location within West and Central Asia
- Interactive map of Bishapur
- 29°46′40″N 51°34′15″E
- Type: Settlement
- Periods: Sasanian Empire
- Cultures: Persian
- Location: Kazerun, Fars province, Iran

History
- Built: 226 AD
- Built by: Shapur I
- Abandoned: 1101 AD
- Events: Construction of Bishapur by order of Shapur I, and its designation as a Sasanian capital.; Residence of Valerian, the Roman emperor.; Birth of Hormizd I, the third Sasanian king.; Birth of Bahram I, the fourth Sasanian king.; Death of Valerian, the Roman emperor.; Death of Shapur I, the second Sasanian king.; Arab conquest of Fars.; Conquest of Bishapur by Mujāshi‘ ibn Mas‘ūd.; Declaration of independence from the Rashidun Caliphate and the Battle of Bishapur.; Revolt of the Arabs and its suppression by Abu Musa al-Ash'ari.; Revolt of the Arabs and its suppression by ‘Umar ibn ‘Ubayd Allāh ibn Ma‘mar.; Revolt against the Umayyads and its suppression by the army of Al-Hajjaj ibn Yusuf.; Migration of the inhabitants to Kazerun and its surroundings.; Conquest by Rukn al-Dawla.; Revival of the city under the rule of the Buyid dynasty.; Destruction of the city by Abu Sa‘id Shabankara.

Site notes
- Material: Limestone, Plaster, Iron
- Area: an area of 194 hectares
- Architectural styles: Greek urban planning (Grid plan), Sasanian architecture, Achaemenid architecture (Some of the remains)
- Condition: Ruins
- Management: Ministry of Cultural Heritage, Tourism and Handicrafts
- Public access: Open

UNESCO World Heritage Site
- Part of: Sassanid Archaeological Landscape of Fars Region
- Criteria: Cultural: ii, iii, v
- Reference: 1568-006
- Inscription: 2018 (42nd Session)

Iran National Heritage List
- Official name: Bishapur
- Type: Ruins
- Designated: 1931
- Reference no.: 24
- Conservation organization: Cultural Heritage, Handicrafts and Tourism Organization of Iran

Bishapur (Middle Persian: Vēh-Šābuhr or Bēšābūr; in Middle Persian inscriptions: 𐭡𐭩𐭱𐭧𐭯𐭥𐭧𐭥𐭩 Byšḥpwḥry or 𐭡𐭩𐭱𐭧𐭯𐭥𐭧𐭫𐭩 Byšḥpwḥly; in Parthian: 𐭅𐭉𐭇𐭔𐭇𐭐𐭅𐭇𐭓 Wyhšhypwhr; in Sogdian: ܘܝݎܫܦܘܪ Wyxšpwr; in Syriac: ܒܝܫܗܒܘܪ; Persian: بیشاپور) was an ancient city in Iran and one of the capitals of the Sasanian Empire, near the city of Kazerun.

This city, listed among Iran's World Heritage Sites, covers an area of about 200 hectares and contains a rich complex of historical monuments and structures.

Bishapur was founded in AD 266 by order of Shapur I to commemorate the Sasanian victory over the Roman Empire, and it remained one of the most important cities of the empire until the Muslim conquest of Persia. After the Islamic period began, the city gradually declined, and most of its inhabitants migrated to Kazerun due to its destruction from the war.

Bishapur is one of the few ancient cities in Iran that was built according to Greek urban planning principles. During the Sasanian period, it rivaled the great and prosperous cities of the Eastern Roman Empire, such as Antioch and Byzantium.

According to historical sources, Bishapur was a fertile and verdant city surrounded by tall fortifications and had four gates named Hormoz, Mehr, Bahram, and Shahr. It also contained two fire temples known as Sasan and Gonbad-e Golshan.

The city, roughly 2 kilometers long and 1 kilometer wide, was laid out on a rectangular plan with two main streets running north–south and east–west, intersecting at the city's center. Along these axes and in the right-angled grid of streets and alleys stood royal palaces richly decorated with stucco reliefs, mosaic-adorned iwans, temples, spacious audience halls, and other elaborate structures featuring large carved capitals and architectural embellishments.

Bishapur is one of the main archaeological sites of the Kazerun region, known for its rich Sasanian heritage.

== Denomination ==
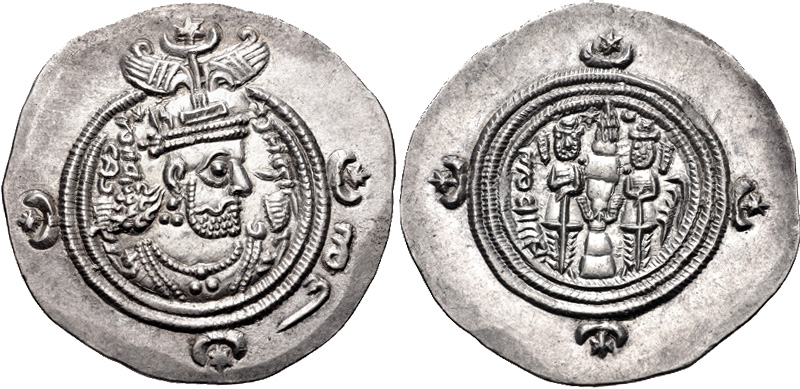
Sassanid coin with the image of Khosrow II, minted in Bishapur

The word Bishapur is composed of two parts: Bay and Šāpūr. The first part in the Middle Persian language means great, lord, and king. The second part is the name of the founder of the city, Shapur I of Sassanid dynasty. Bishapur can be interpreted as Shapur the Great or Shapur the Lord. In some sources, Bishapur is also referred to as the palace of Shapur. Some historical sources also consider Bishapur to be a modified form of the word Banāy-e Shapur means Shapur building. However, some believe that due to the fact that the builders of Bishapur modeled themselves after the city of Antakya and the decree of Shapur the Sassanid to build a better city than Antakya, its name changed from Beh-Az-Antakya-Shapur or Beh-Az-Andiv-Shapur to Bishapur. The name Bishapur is also minted on Sasanian coins in the form of Bish (abbreviated) and Veshapur. This name was minted on coins in Pahlavi scripts during the Sasanian era and in Kufic script during the Islamic era. However, the common name of the city has always been Bishapur.

== Location ==
The ancient city of Bishapur is located next to the Chowgan Valley and the Shapur River, 15 kilometers west of Kazerun, in southwestern Iran. Bishapur was built near a river crossing and at the same site there is also a fort with rock-cut reservoirs and a river valley with six Sassanid rock reliefs.

== National and World registration ==
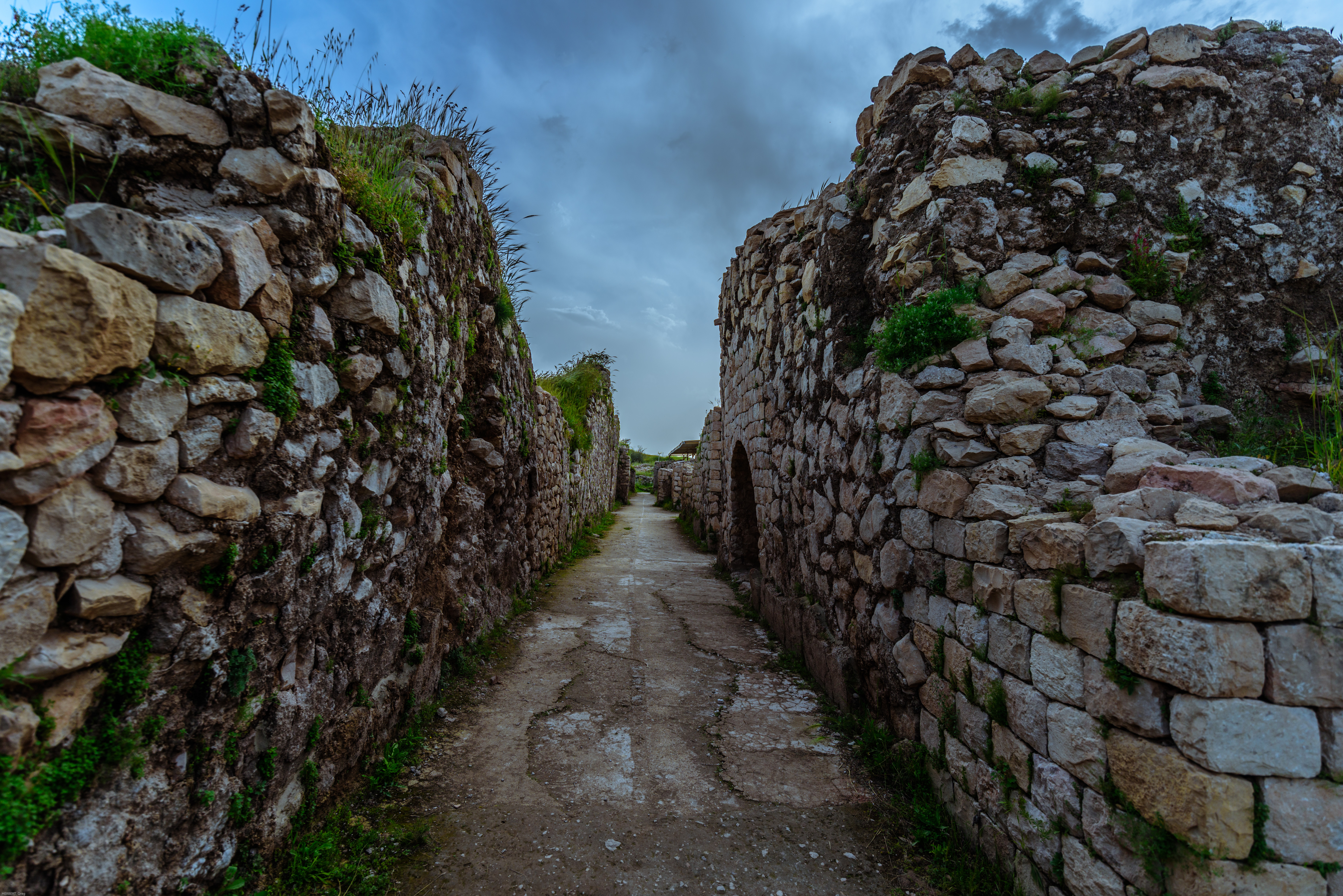
Bishapur Passages

The ancient city of Bishapur was registered on September 16, 1931, with number 24 as one of the first Iran National Heritage List. The city was also officially inscribed on the World Heritage List at the 42nd World Heritage Session held in Bahrain on June 30, 2018.

== History ==
According to an inscription, the city itself was founded and built in 266 AD by Shapur I (241–272), who was the second Sassanid king and inflicted a triple defeat on the Romans, having killed Gordian III, captured Valerian and forced Philip the Arab to surrender. The city was not a completely new settlement: archaeologists have found remains from the Parthian and Elamite eras. The city remained important until the Arab conquest of Persia the rise of Islam in the second quarter of the 7th century AD.

The city has a rectangular plan with a grid pattern of regular intra urban streets, resembling Roman city design. This design was never repeated in the architecture of Iran.

=== Pre-Islamic era ===
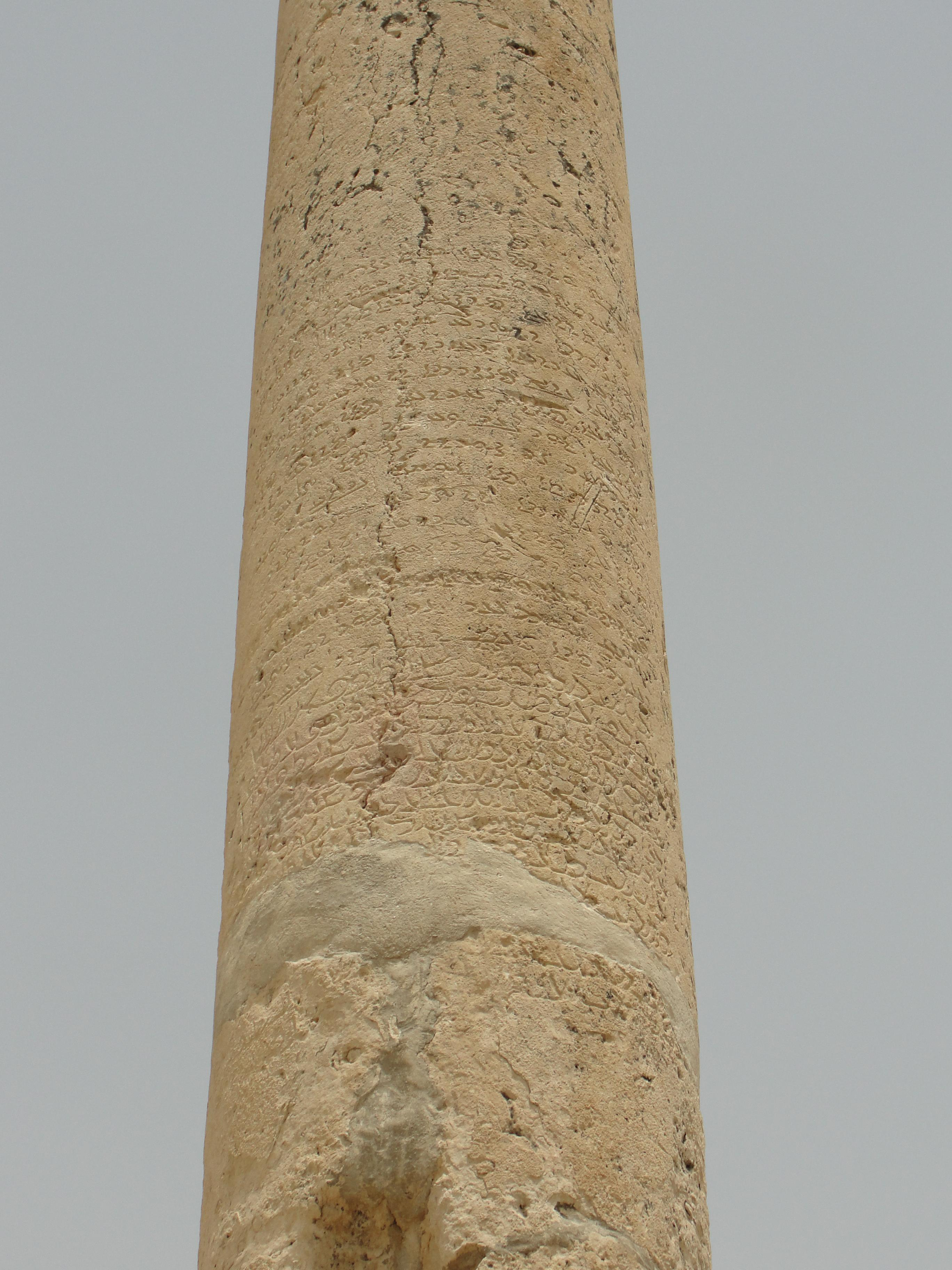
The inscription of Apasa of Harran which mentions the order to build the city of Bishapur

According to historical books, before the establishment of the city of Bishapur, there was an ancient city called Din-Della in this same location, which was founded at the same time as Kazerun by Tahmuras and began to flourish during the Achaemenid Empire, but was destroyed during Alexander the Great's attack on Persia. In 266 AD, after the Sassanid army defeated the Romans and captured Valerian, the Roman emperor during the Battle of Edessa, Shapur I, the king of Persia, ordered the construction of the city of Bishapur on the ruins of Din-Della. Shapur named the city after himself and selected an architect named Apasa from Harran to build it. Bishapur was built using the Greek (Hippodamus of Miletus) urban planning method by Roman prisoners. Most of its buildings were built by Roman engineers and architects. Bishapur was one of the capitals of the Sasanian Empire and the center of the Shapur-Khwarrah province. The city was the birthplace of Hormizd I and Bahram I, two Sasanian kings. Valerian, the captured Roman emperor, lived in a Palace built for him by Shapur the Sassanid in the city of Bishapur, and according to some accounts, he also died in the same city. Shapur I, the Sasanian king, also died in the city of Bishapur in 270 AD. Until the Arab invasion of Iran, Bishapur was a thriving city with a population of between 50,000 and 80,000.

=== Islamic era ===
==== Conquest by Muslim Arabs ====
During the Arab conquest of Persia in 638 AD, Umar assigned one of his commanders named Mojashe bin Masoud to conquer Shapur-Khwarrah. Despite the great resistance of the people of Shapur-Khwarrah, the Arabs conquered Bishapur. After that, the people and Bishapur continuously rebelled against the Arabs.

==== Declaration of Independence ====
Among in the year 643 AD and after the caliphate of Uthman, the people of Shapur-Khwarrah, under the command of Shahrag's brother, one of the Sassanid nobles declared independence. But in the end, after the Great battle of Bishapur and the siege of this city, Uthman bin Abi al-As finally conquered Bishapur, Now Bandegan and Jereh again with peace and receiving the wealth and tribute.

==== Later Riots ====
The people of Shapur broke their agreement again in 646 AD and Uthman conquered the city again with Abu Musa al-Ash'ari. The resistance of the people of Shapur-Khwarrah against the Arabs was so great that Abida, the Arab general, was seriously injured and when he was dying, he requested the Arab troops to massacre the people of this region for the sake of killing him, and the same thing happened. In 687 AD, the people of Shapur-Khwarrah revolted against the Arabs once again, and this time they were suppressed by Umar bin Ubaidullah bin Muammar. In the year 702 AD and during the rule of Al-Hajjaj ibn Yusuf, the displaced people in Shapur-Khwarrah, who were waiting for revenge, rushed with the help of Ibn al-Ash'ath in a rebellion against Hajjaj ibn Yusuf and defeated the Hajjaj army and captured the city of Kufa. However, with the arrival of reinforcements, the rebels were defeated and Shapur-Khwarrah was again under the control of the Army Umayyads.

==== Migration of Bishapur residents to Kazerun ====
Bishapur gradually lost its prosperity in the 8th and 9th centuries of AD, and with the migration of its residents to Kazerun and its surroundings, it transferred its prosperity to this city.

==== Buyid dynasty ====
In 321 AH, Imad al-Dawla, the founder of the Buyid dynasty, sent his brother Rukn al-Dawla to the region to capture Kazerun and Bishapur. Rukn al-Dawla defeated Yaqut, the governor of Kazerun, and captured the region. The Buyid rulers, especially 'Adud al-Dawla, tried to revive the ancient city of Bishapur at the same time as the prosperity of Kazerun, and they were able to restore prosperity to the city to some extent after several centuries. Coins minted in Bishapur during this period also confirm this. Ibn Hawqal says about the prosperity of Bishapur in the first half of the fourth century AH:

A city as large as Istakhr, but more prosperous and populous, and its people more capable.

==== Destruction during the Seljuk Empire ====
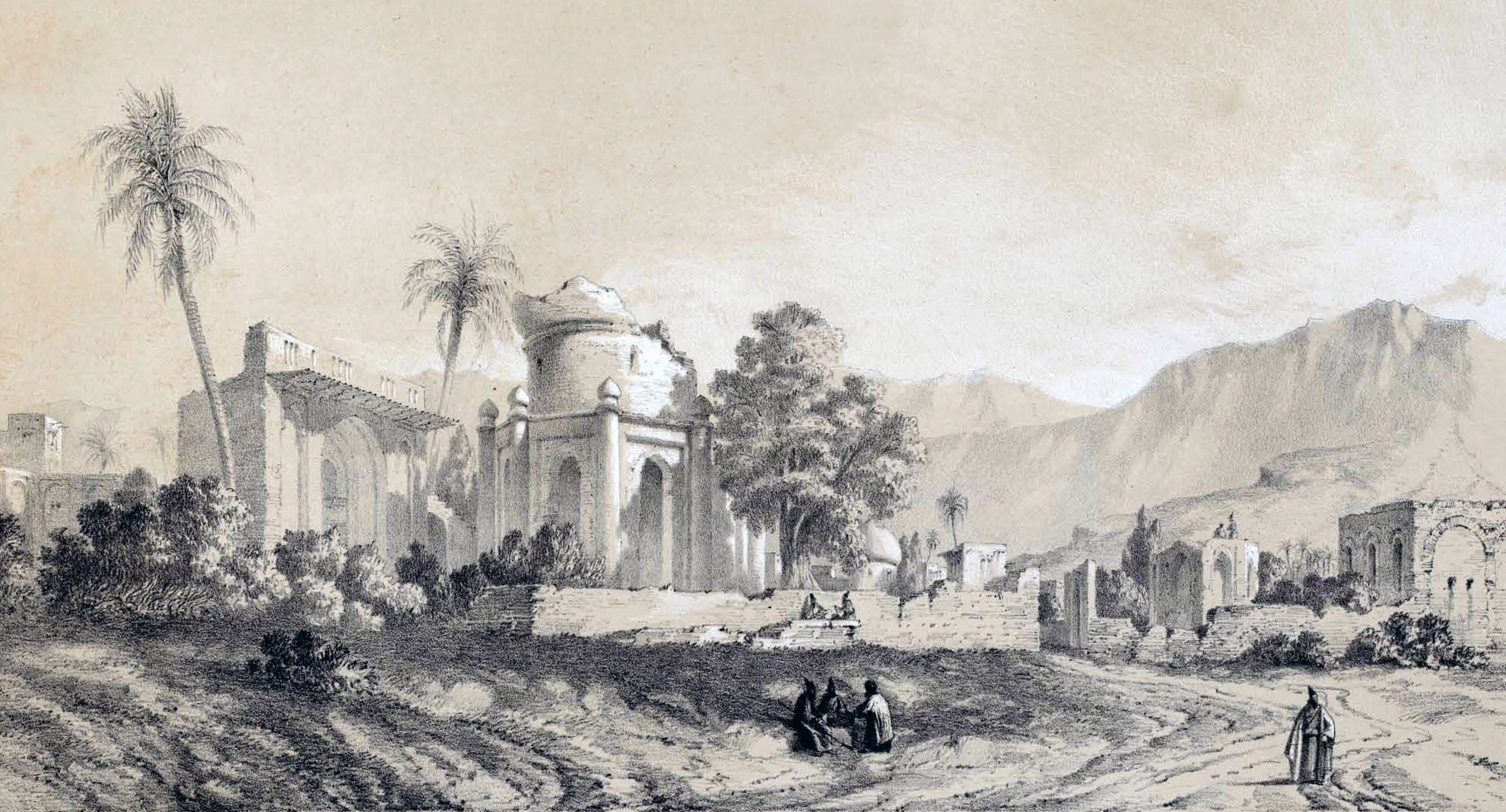
Bishapur in 1840; a painting by Eugène Flandin in the book "Travel in Persia" (Voyage en Perse)

Bishapur fell into ruin in the second half of the 4th century AH. During the Seljuk Empire, the administration of the Fars territory was entrusted to the ruler of the Shabankara tribe. The people of this tribe always engaged in killing and plundering in this region until finally, in 495 AH, Abu Sa'id Shabankara set fire to the city of Bishapur and razed it to the ground, and then a terrible earthquake dealt the final blow to the city.

== History of Excavations ==
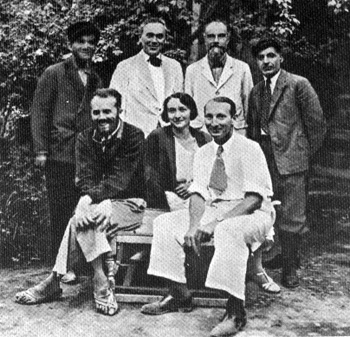
Roman Ghirshman and his excavation team, the first explorers of Bishapur

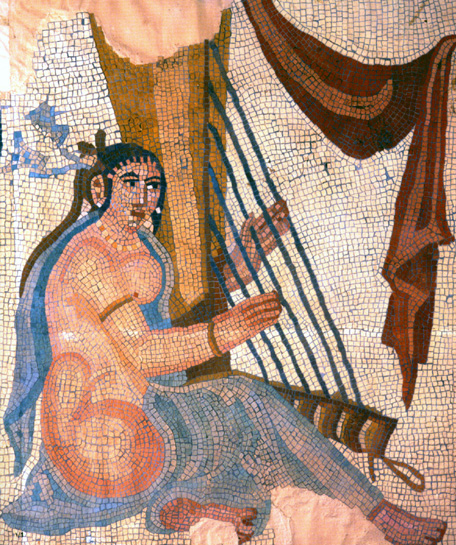
Sasanian mosaic of a harpist, discovered in the Bishapur mosaic porch, currently housed in the Louvre Museum in Paris.

Between 1935 and 1940, Georges Salles and Roman Ghirshman, representatives from the Louvre Museum in Paris, first conducted archaeological excavations in Bishapur, which resulted in a book about the city in French. However, with the outbreak of World War II, the explorers immediately left Iran. Many of the artifacts discovered in Bishapur were transferred to the Louvre Museum, and some are kept in the Museum of Ancient Iran. 28 years later, the Archaeological Center of the Ministry of Culture and Art decided to excavate, repair, and restore the discovered structures. An Iranian archaeological team headed by Ali Akbar Sarfaraz began its work in Bishapur and, in addition to liberating the city's towers and ramparts, succeeded in discovering important buildings such as the Temple of Anahita, the Ceremonial Hall, the Mosaic Porch, the Valerian Palace, the Rituals Place, and Islamic buildings. After long interruptions, the third phase of excavations in this city was carried out in 1995. The British archaeologist Georgina Herrmann has also written a book about the Sasanian rock reliefs in Bishapur which was published in 1980. However, only three percent of the city of Bishapur has been discovered so far, and ninety-seven percent of it is still buried underground. In 2025, cultural heritage officials announced the start of a new season of excavations in Bishapur, focusing on Valerian Palace.

== Urbanization ==
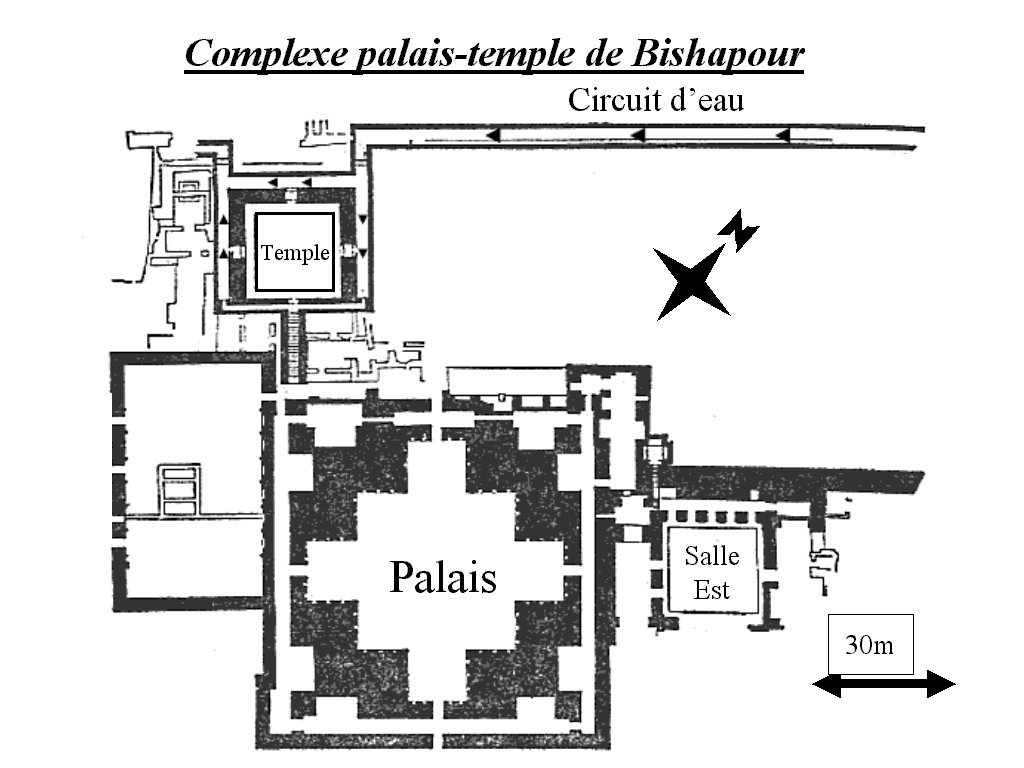
Plan of the Royal Citadel of Bishapur

The city of Bishapur was designed in the Greek urban planning method (Hippodamus) on a rectangular plot of land in such a way that four gates and two streets intersected each other. One of the streets ran north-south and the other east-west, and each ended at one of the city gates. The western gate was the main entrance to the city. The city consisted of two parts: the royal citadel and the common citadel. The royal citadel complex includes notable monuments such as the Anahita Temple, the Ceremonial Hall, Shapur Palace, Valerian Palace, and Iwan-e Mosaic. The common citadel also included residential houses, a bathhouse, a caravanserai, and a market. Bishapur was protected by mountains, rivers, castle walls, and a Moat.

== Notable Monuments and Buildings ==
=== Temple of Anahita ===
The temple or shrine of Anahita is in the shape of a cube, each side of which is about 14 meters long. It is made of excavated stones of different sizes and without mortar, double-walled, and inspired by Achaemenid architecture, locked together with iron fasteners, forming a single whole. This temple is very similar to the temple of Hatra in Mesopotamia. Four vestibules are located on the side surfaces of the temple, 357 cm high and 160 cm wide, on the four sides of the temple, and on top of the temple's nave, there are four statues of cows in the form of double bodies. Two statues of cows are still beautifully visible in the northern part, which, in addition to being decorations, were also symbols and signs of the temple. The Anahita Temple had no roof or dome. To construct this large temple, an area measuring 27 x 23 x 7 meters was excavated and planned to be built 6 meters below the surrounding land surface so that the water of the Shapur River, which flows 250 meters away, would flow into it. For this purpose, the water-distributing stone with three floor has been installed at the end of the eastern and western corridors and at the place of the water symbol, in such a way that the floor on the left causes water to flow from a narrow stream 6 centimeters deep along the eastern corridor, while a branch from the center of the eastern corridor enters the central courtyard of the temple. The rest of the water, after passing through the canal on the edge of this corridor, entered the water intake area, and the excess water, at the end of the corridor, by installing another water-distributing stone installed at this location, entered the western corridor of the temple, where it divided into two other streams and filled the entire western corridor in the same way as it flowed in the northeastern corridor. These conditions also prevailed on the right entrance floor, and the function of the middle floor was to regulate the water, that is, to reduce and increase the flow of water to the other two floors. The place of playing with water and its worship was of more importance than anything else, and it indicates the attention paid to the worship of the water goddess at that time. The division and control of the water flow were also of interest, and it can be compared to the Anahita Temple in the historical city of Istakhr. The Anahita Temple is a symbol of the temple of water, the only element of the four elements that is assigned to Anahita, the goddess of water, and the animal symbol of this Aryan goddess, in the form of a cow, decorates the temple all around. Anahita was considered the goddess of the Sasanian dynasty, and at the beginning of the Sasanian Empire, Ardashir I and Shapur I were in charge of the Anahita temple, and throughout history, this goddess has been respected and praised among the Persis people.

=== Ceremonial Hall ===
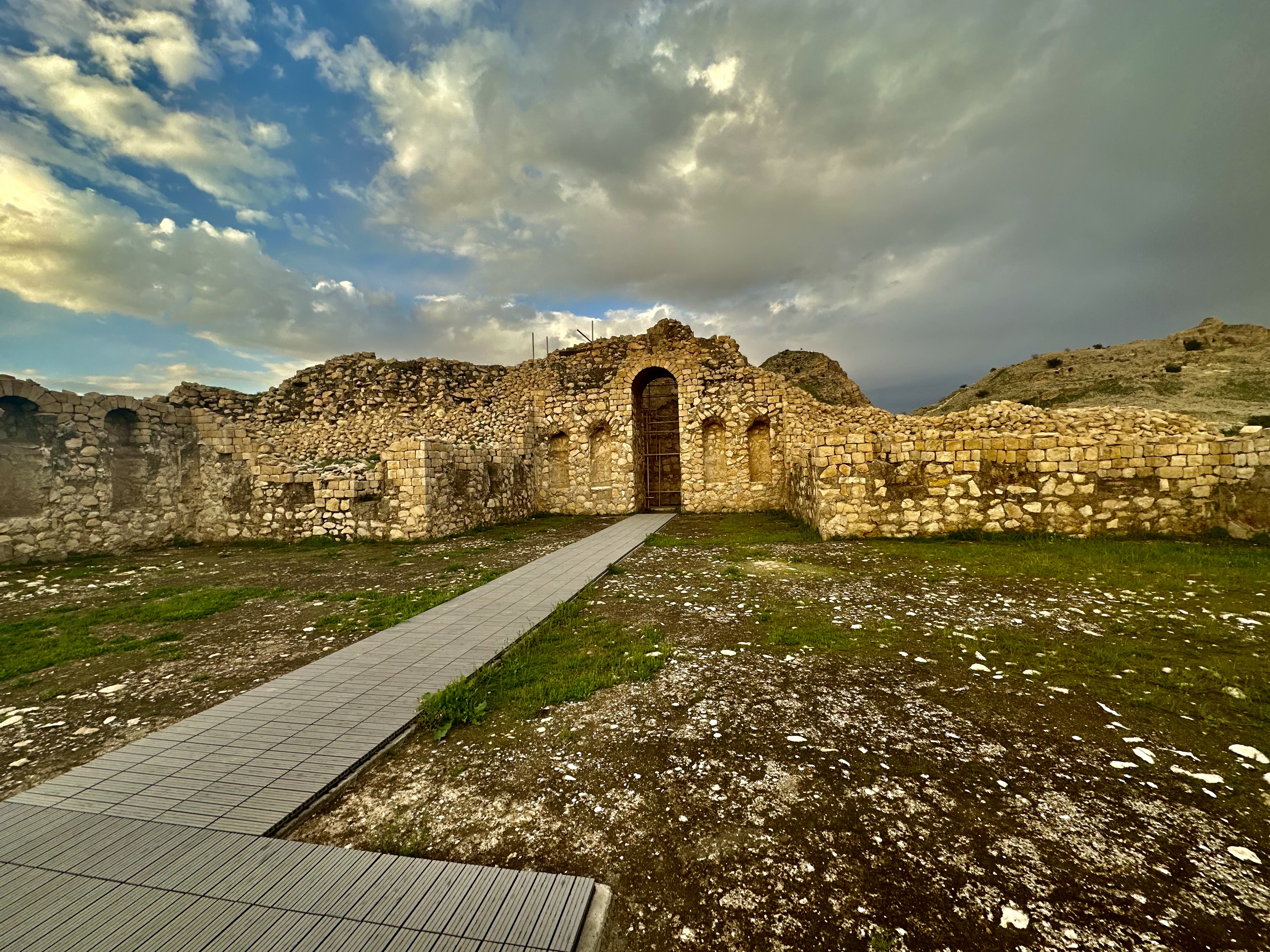
This hall was the venue for royal ceremonies and receptions.

The reception hall of Shapur I, with an area of 781 square meters and a height of 23 meters, is considered one of the largest architectural works of the Sasanian era, which was built in the form of an Iranian cross, or Aryan cross, for the first time in the history of Sasanian architecture. The architecture of this hall was so admired that from then on, all Fire temples were built according to its plan, and even many post-Islamic buildings, including the so-called Chahar-Sofeh buildings, were inspired by its plan. The ceremonial hall has four symmetrical and opposite Iwan, over which there was a large and Parabola Dome. The northern Iwan was 9 meters long and 7 meters wide, and it led to the adjacent corridor through a 118-meter-wide doorway, and had four Niches with stucco and painting on either side of the doorway. Each of the Iwans had three symmetrical niches, and the side surfaces of the reception hall had a total of 64 decorative niches. The ceremonial hall was surrounded by corridors for circulation, and from within the four Iwans of the hall, doorways led to the corridors. The western corridor led to the Anahita Temple, and the southern corridor ended at the Iwan-e Mosaic. The northern corridor led to the open space and the promenade.

=== Ayvān-e Mosaic ===
At the ends of the eastern and western corridors of the ceremonial hall, there are two Iwans with floors carpeted with Mosaics and rich decorations. These two Iwans have crescent arches and a carpet of colored stones with images of human faces and limbs and plants covers their floors. Ayvān-e Mosaic is an example of a masterpiece of decorative architectural art, overlooking a rectangular courtyard measuring 23 by 20 meters with columns carved with human and plant motifs. This Iwan was the private residence and inner courtyard of Shapur I.

=== Valerian Palace ===
In 266 AD, after the Battle of Edessa, it was built near the Shapur's government palace, on the orders of Shapur I, the king of Iran, for the residence of Valerian, the Roman emperor who was defeated in this battle and taken prisoner. He was kept under surveillance in this palace throughout his life. Valerian's Palace is octagonal in shape and is located 150 meters from the ceremonial hall. Its interior walls are made of carved stones measuring 70 by 45 centimeters and its exterior surface is covered with white plaster, giving it the appearance of a white palace. This style is a characteristic of Sasanian architecture. There are Sassanid royal symbols on some of the stones. All parts of this palace have relief designs and luxurious carvings.

=== Commemorative Columns ===
On the western edge of the northern and southern streets of Bishapur, 525 meters from the Anahita Temple, there are two 37-meter-high stone columns with luxurious capitals. The base diameter is 70 centimeters and the top diameter is 60 centimeters. On top of one of the columns is a statue of Shapur I, and on the other column, the historical document of the establishment of the city of Bishapur is engraved in the Parthian and Sasanian Pahlavi script. According to this text, the designer and supervising engineer of Bishapur was a person named Apasa from Harran, who was very much in the interest and favor of Shapur the Sassanid. Religious ceremonies were performed at the foot of this column, and in fact, these columns, in addition to their sacred aspect, were also considered a memorial building. The translation of the text engraved on this pillar is as follows:

In the month of Farvardin, 58 years after the fire of Ardashir, and in the year 30 after the fire of Shapur Shah, the immortal of that year, this is the statue of the Mazda-worshipper, Shapur the God, the king of kings of Iran and non-Iran, the pure race of gods, the grandson of Pabag God. These works were made by Apasa from the city of Harran, which is the city of his family, For his king, the Mazda-worshipper, Shapur the God, the king of kings of Iran and non-Iran, race of gods, he created. When the king of kings saw this image, he gave Apasa a robe of gold and silver, a garden, and a temple.

=== Qal'eh Dokhtar ===
On the peak of one of the southern mountains of Bishapur, near the Azhdahā Valley, is a castle known as the Qal'eh Dokhtar and the Fire Temple Tower. This castle was the city's fortification from which the entire city and its surroundings could be observed. There are theories about this fort. Some believe that this fort and the square stone above it were places where the bodies of the dead were placed so that birds could eat the flesh of the carcasses and remove filth and impurity from the earth, and the bones of the dead would decay over time. Some other experts believe that this tower was one of the towers used to send news by fire, examples of which also existed in Pasargadae, Persepolis, and Susa. At the top of the tower there was an always-lit fire tower, through which messages were exchanged by fire. American archaeologist Alfred Feit has also described this castle as a type of watchtower and news transmitter.

=== Mosque and School of the Islamic era ===
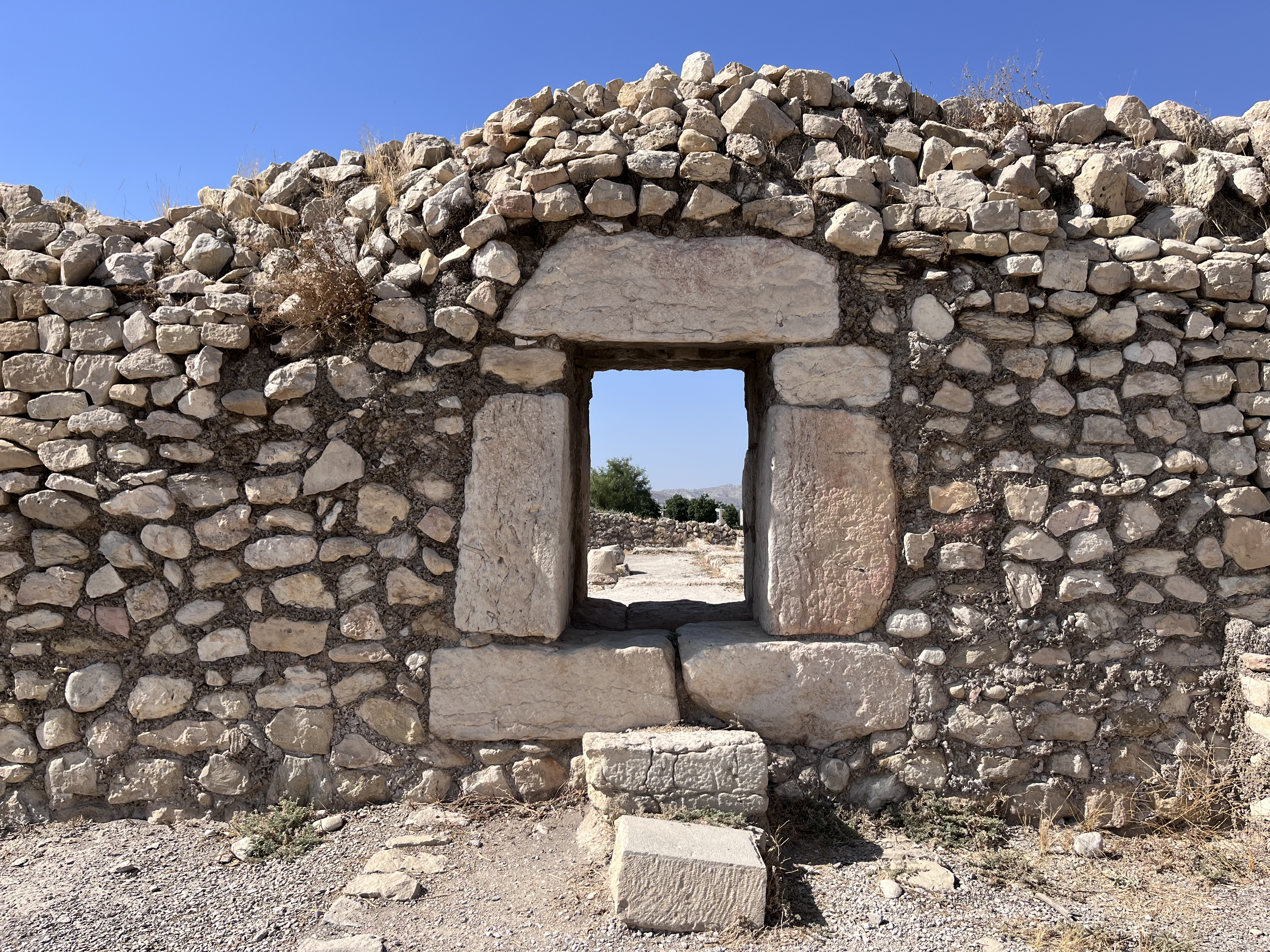
Entrance to the Islamic era school of Bishapur

The remains of a Mosque and religious School have been discovered in the north of the city of Bishapur, dating back to the Buyid dynasty. The original plan of this building was completely transformed into a four-Iwan structure during the changes of the second period, after the great earthquake. Thus, the school's open space, which is 11.7 meters long, was built with 6 Parabola-shaped pillars, and each of these pillars is placed on a cube-shaped base that is carved and decorated in various shapes. In front of the northern Iwan, there was a pillar base and its counterpart on the southern facade was a stone pillar base. In front of the eastern porch, there were two stone pillars, and in front of the western Iwan, there were two stone pillars. Thus, the pillars of the northern and southern bodies, as well as the pillars of the eastern and western facades, were built symmetrically on the edge of the Sahn of the mosque, and the appearance of the remains of this building indicates that the architects used the utmost elegance and good taste in its construction. The western Iwan of the mosque, 6 meters long and 395 meters wide, is located opposite the eastern Iwan, next to the mosque's Shabestan. On both sides of the western Iwan, two symmetrical rooms were built, and inside the northern and southern Iwans, platforms were created for seating. The southern Iwan of the school, which is built as a mirror image of the northern Iwan, is about 50 centimeters higher than the other two Iwans, so that a step measuring 30 by 65 centimeters and 25 centimeters high has been installed in front of it. The Mihrab was built next to the western Iwan in an area measuring 2.5 meters long and 2 meters wide. In the Sahn of the mosque, which was used as an open space, the bases of stone pillars with Quran inscriptions mixed with floral and plant motifs and colorful colors used in the paintings of the northern Iwan were designed to beautify the space. Next to the southern Iwan is the mosque's Shabestan, which was a direct entrance to the mosque's Minaret area for the call to Adhan. The school was built in two Sahn, the larger courtyard for men and the smaller one for women.

=== Bishapur Museum ===
The Bishapur Museum contains a collection of valuable artifacts and objects discovered in Bishapur and the outskirts of Kazerun.

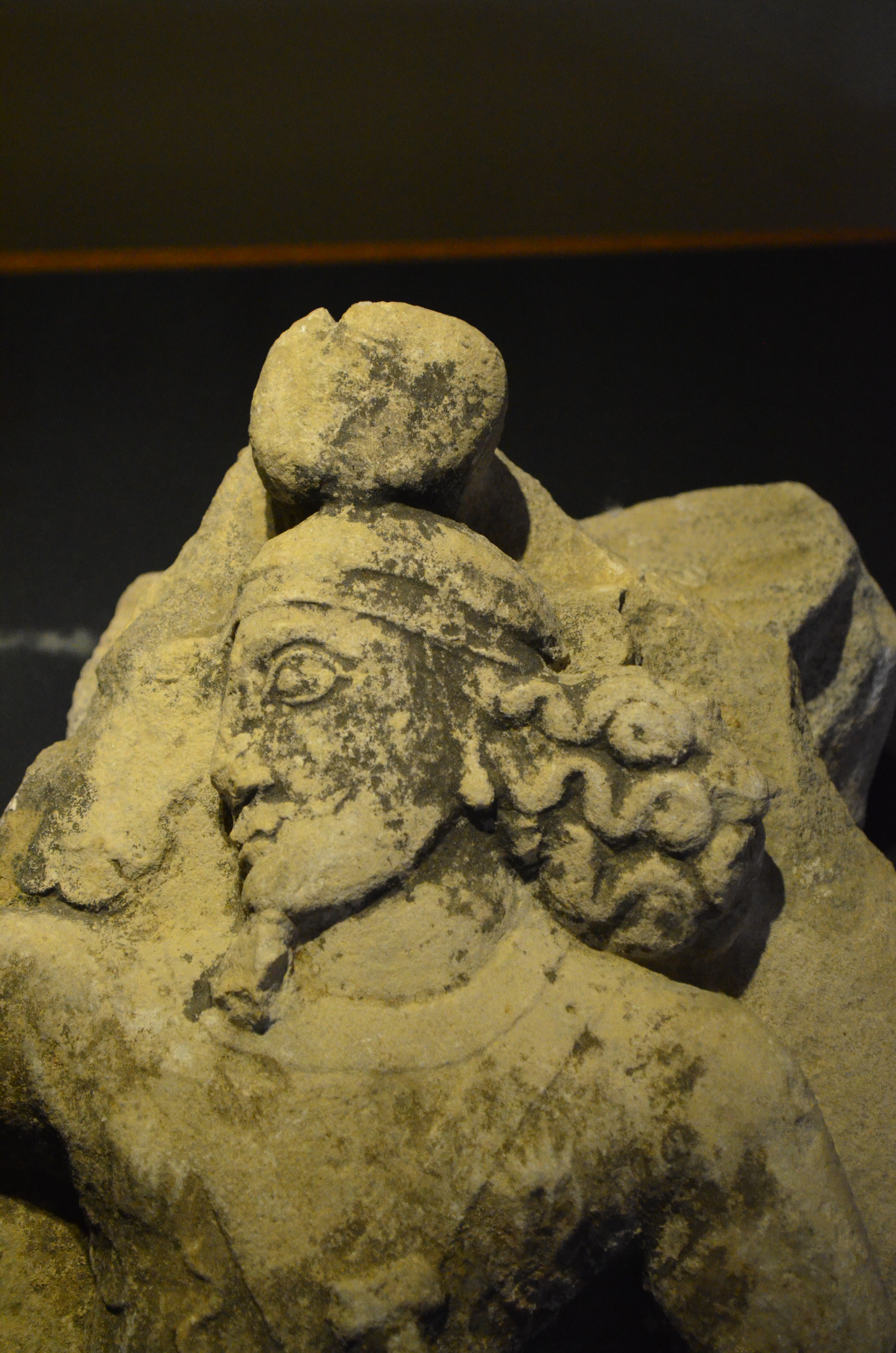

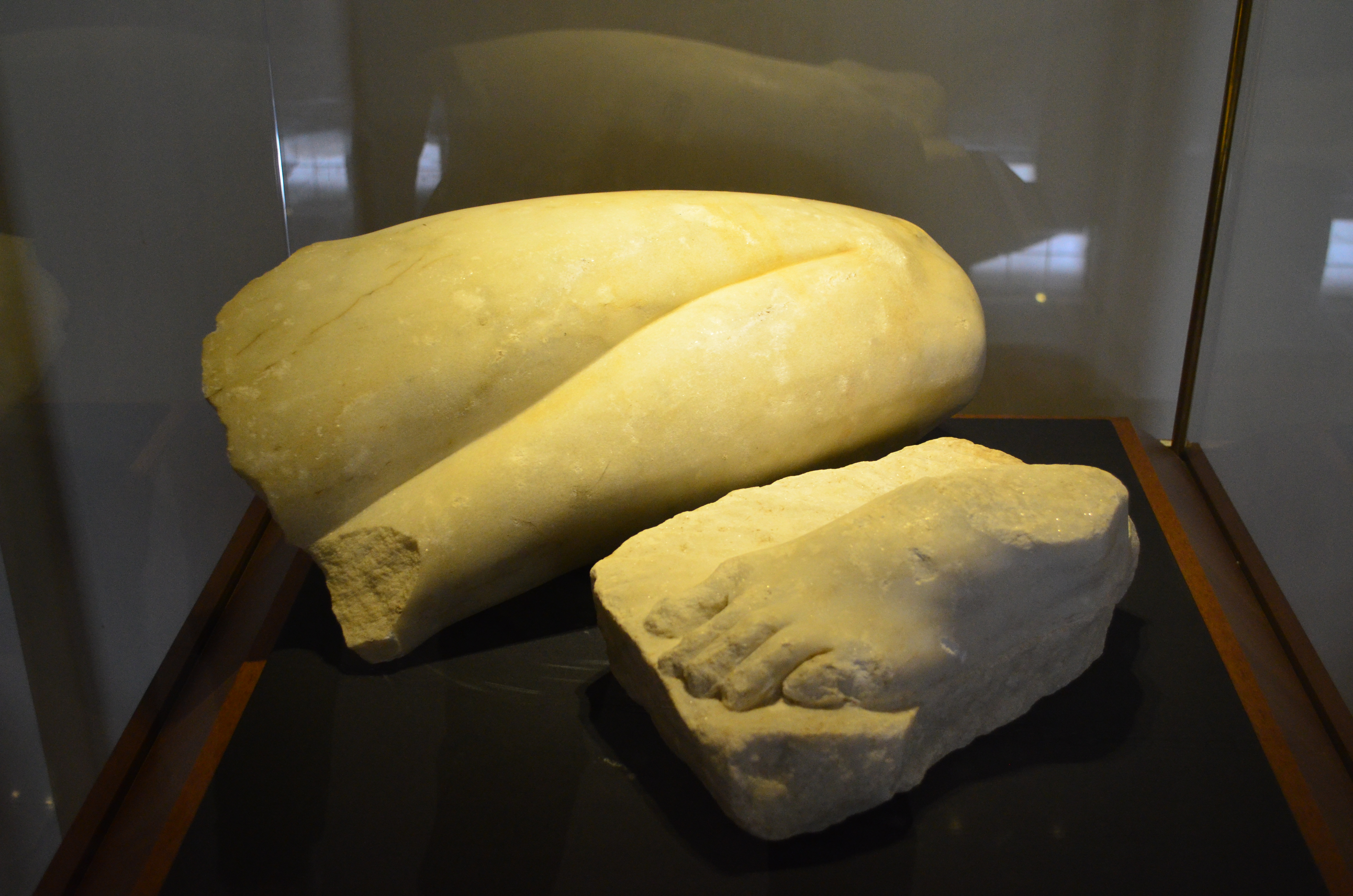

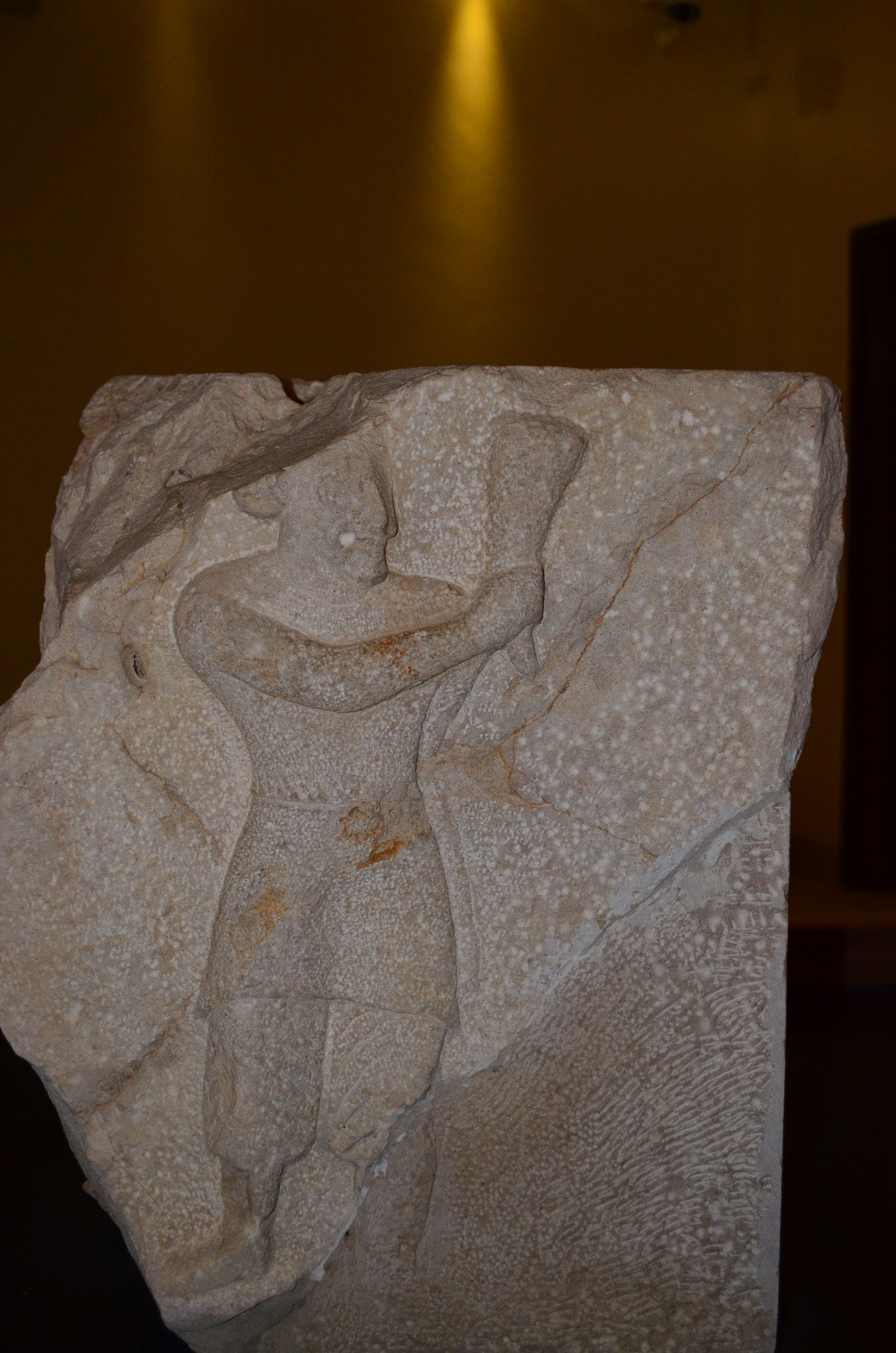

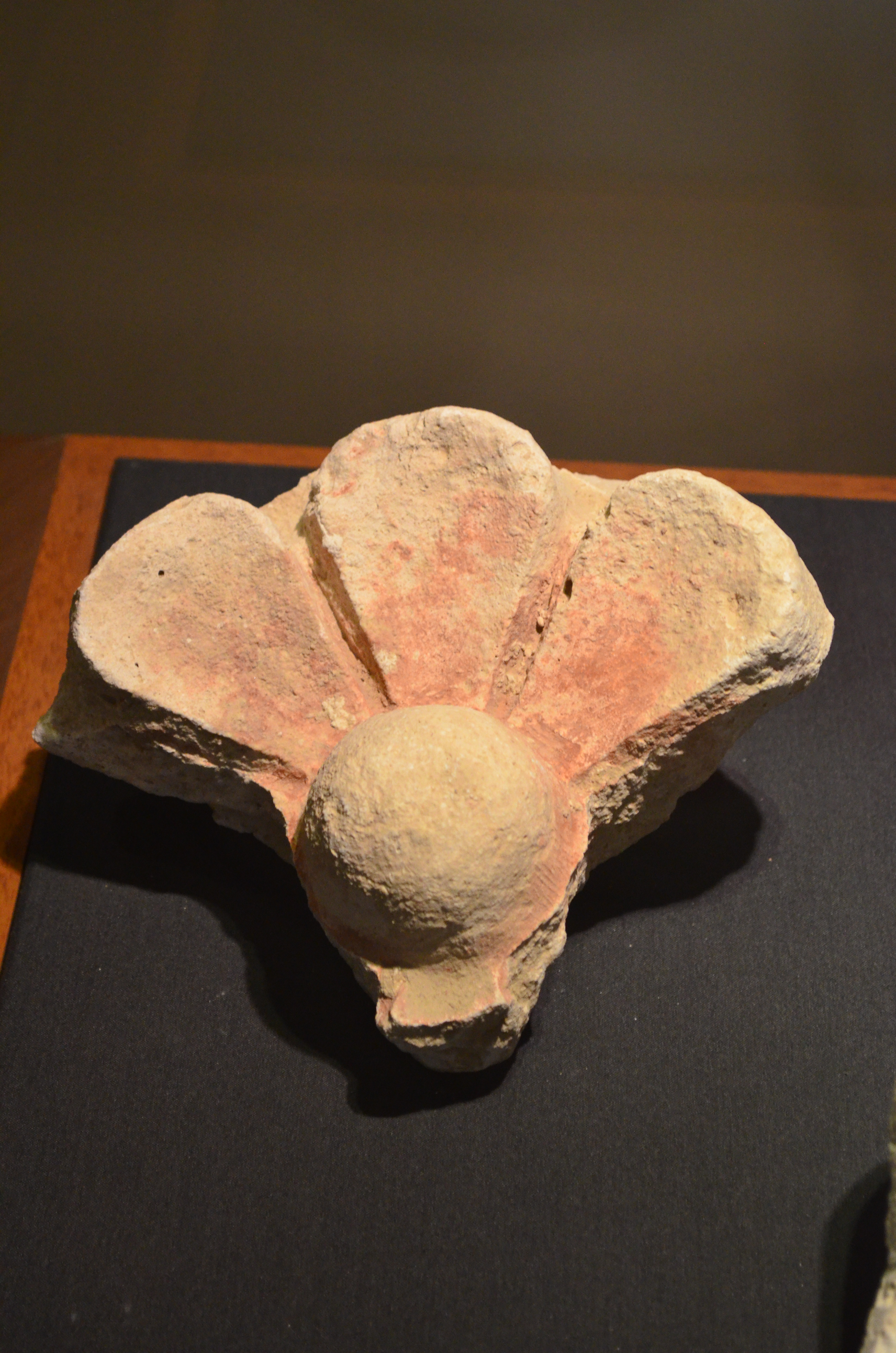

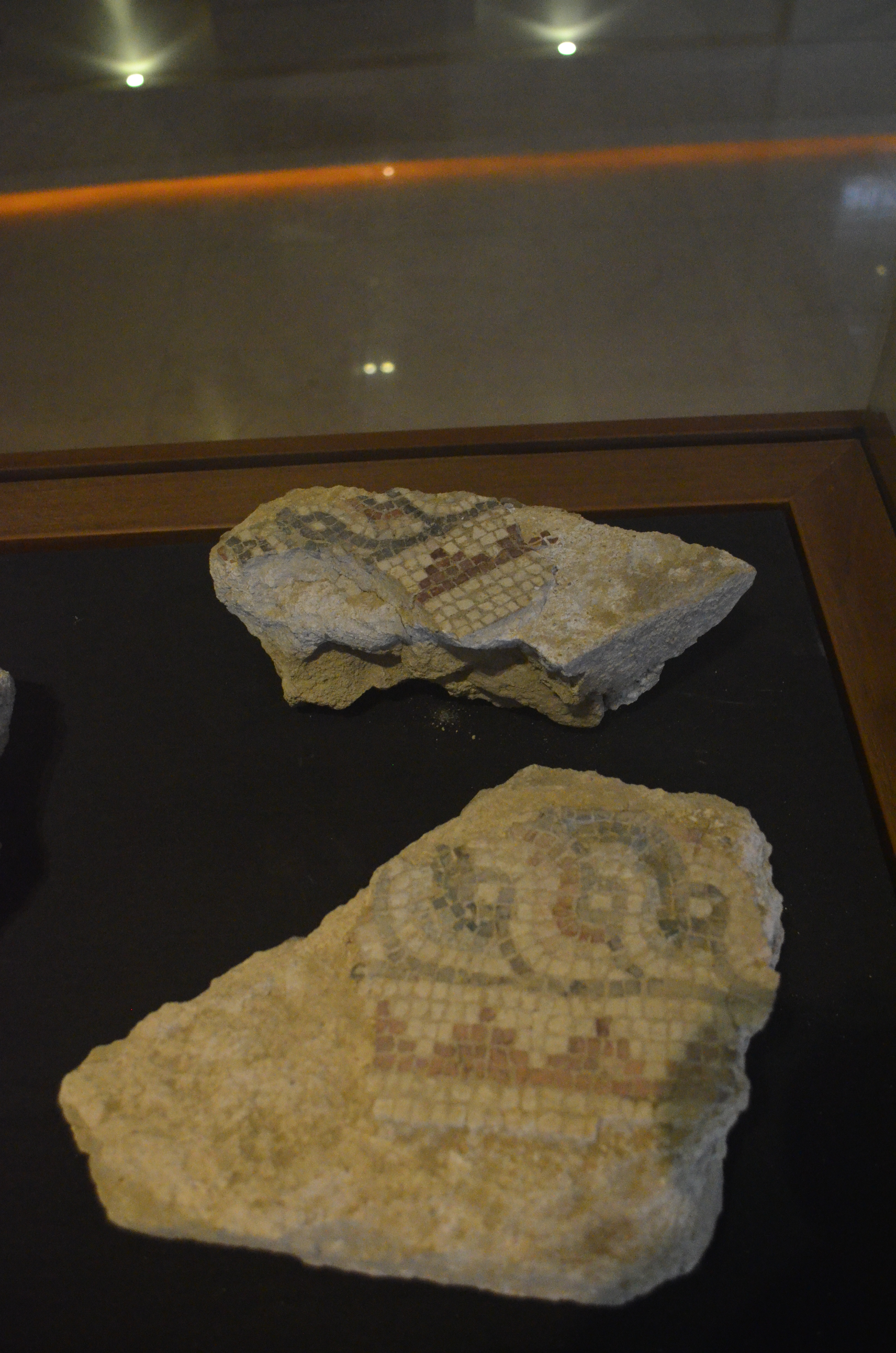

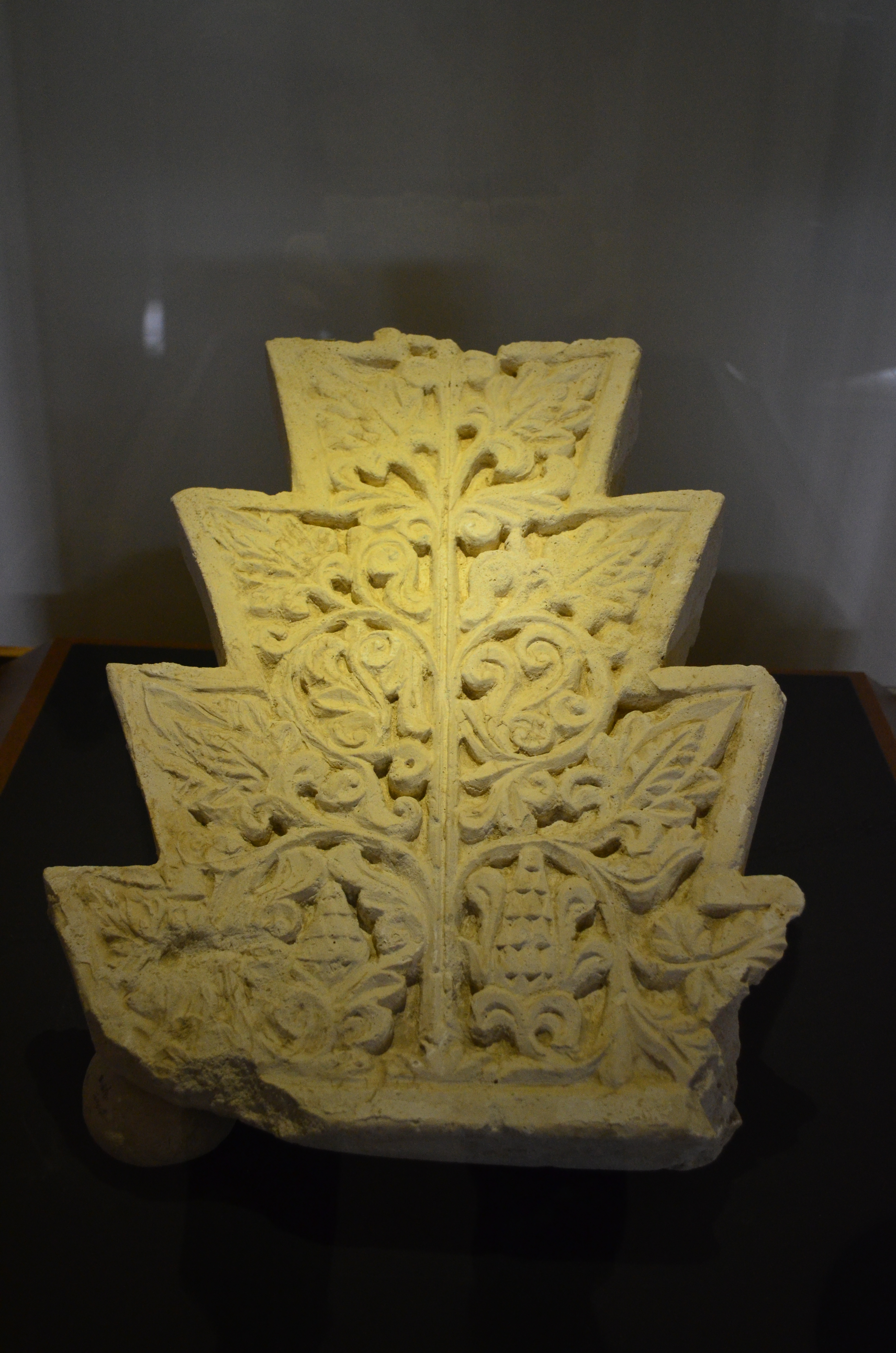

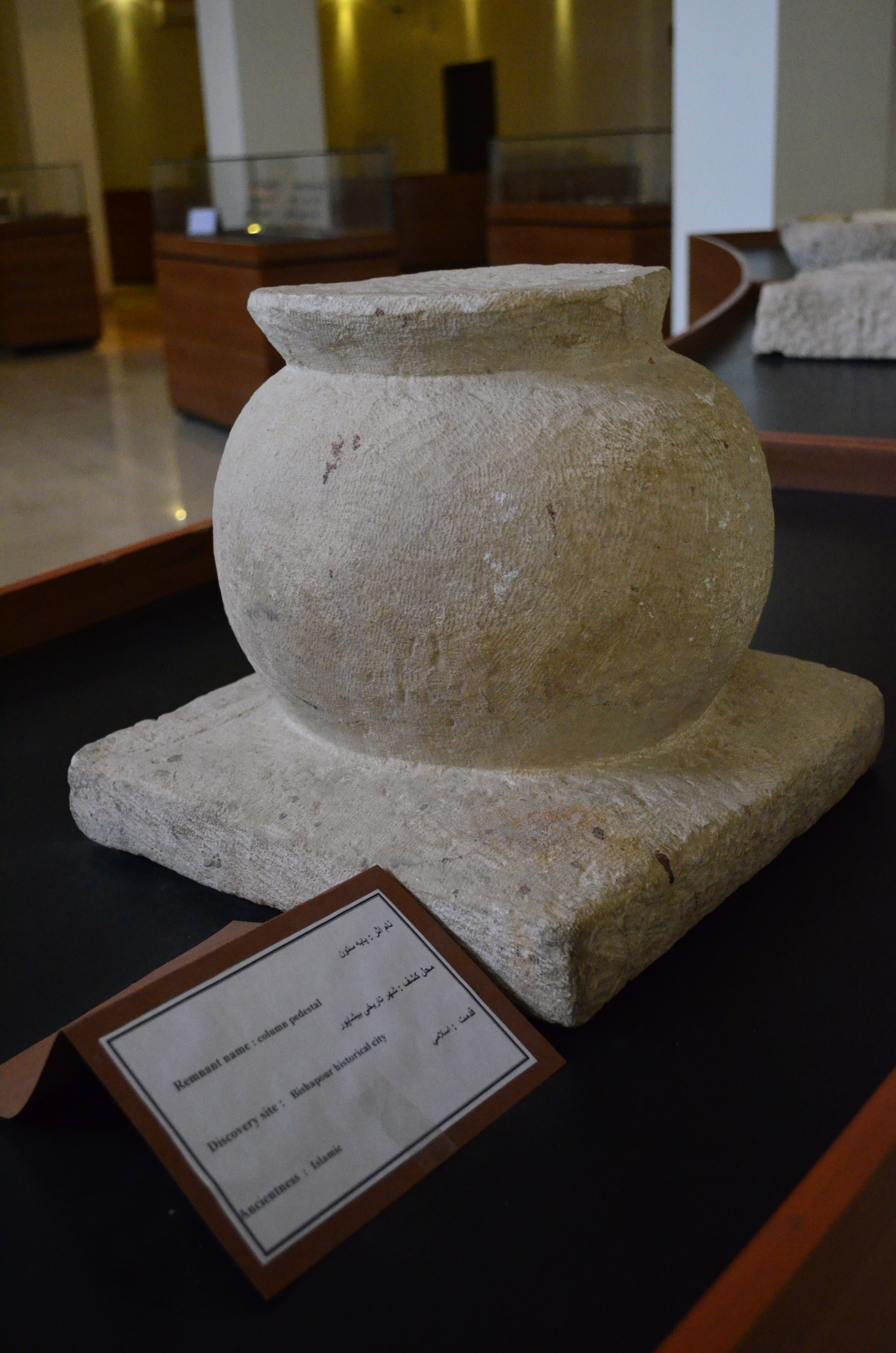

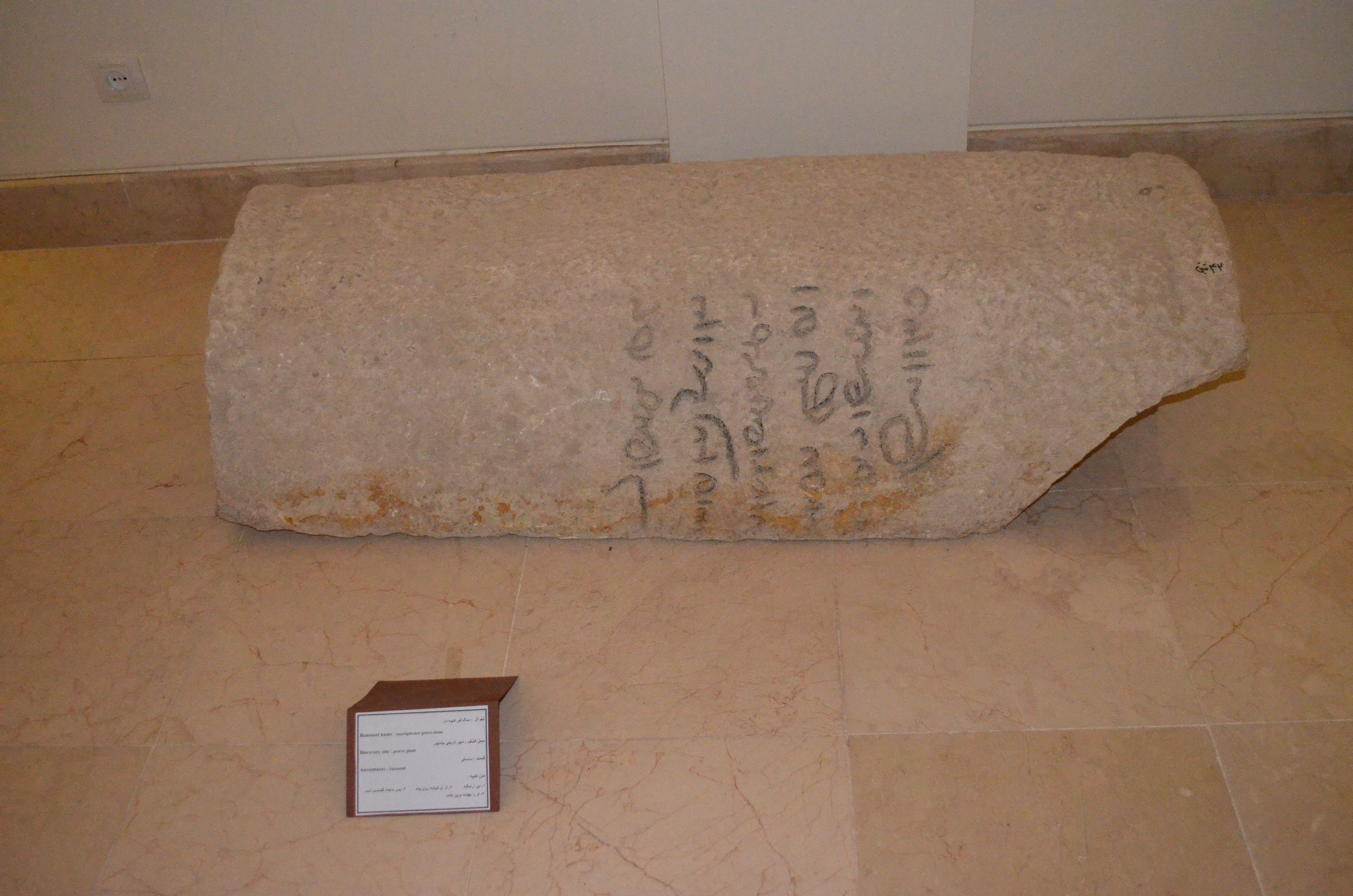

== See also ==
- Kazerun
- Temple of Anahita, Bishapur
- Valerian Palace
- Shapur cave
- Colossal Statue of Shapur I
- Shapur I
- Sasanian architecture
- Sasanian Empire
- Archaeology of Iran
- List of World Heritage Sites in Iran
- Sassanid Archaeological Landscape of Fars Region
- Roman–Persian Wars

== Bibliography ==
- Mozaffarian, Manouchehr (1994). Kazerun in the mirror of Iranian culture. Navid Publications of Shiraz.
- Mittertrainer, Anahita Nasrin (2020). Sinnbilder politischer Autorität? Frühsasanidische Städtebilder im Südwesten Irans [Emblems of political authority? Early Sasanian cityscapes in southwestern Iran]. Munich: Ludwig-Maximilians-Universität München, ISBN 978-3-95925-131-0, on Bishapur esp. pp. 131–197.

== Related sites ==
- Kazerun – the modern city near Bishapur
- Shapur cave – the statue of Shapur I located in a nearby cave
- Temple of Anahita, Bishapur
- Valerian Palace
