= Valerian Palace =

UNESCO world heritage site in Iran

- 𐭪𐭠𐭧𐭥𐭠𐭩𐭫𐭩𐭭 (Classical Syriac) کاخ والرین (Persian)
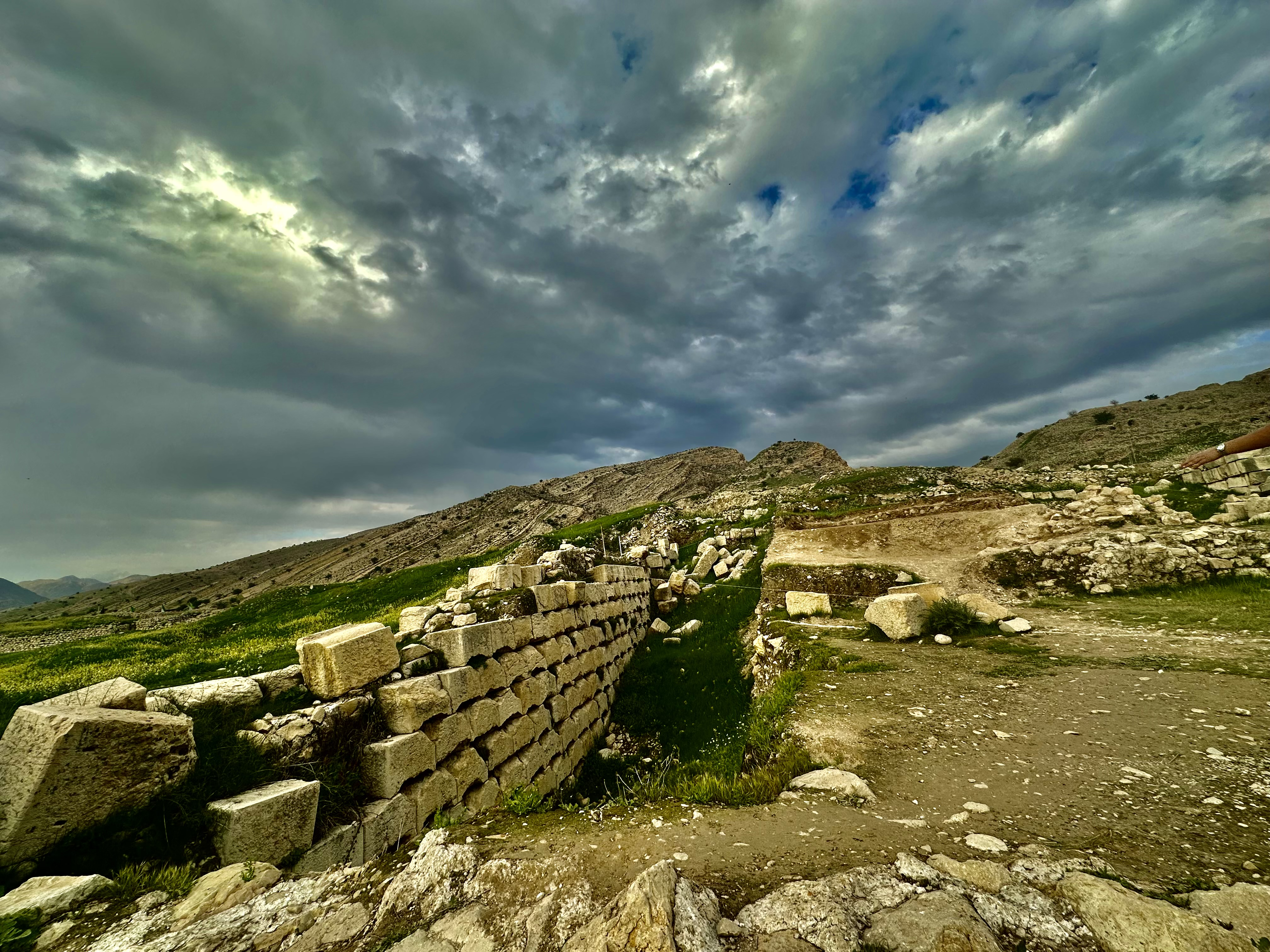
- Valerian Palace in Bishapur

- Location within Iran Location within West and Central Asia
- 29.780°N 51.577°E
- Type: Palace
- Periods: Sasanian Empire
- Cultures: Persian
- Location: Kazerun, Fars province, Iran

History
- Built: 3rd century AD
- Built by: Shapur I

Site notes
- Material: Limestone, Plaster
- Architectural style: Sasanian
- Condition: Ruins
- Management: Cultural Heritage, Handicrafts and Tourism Organization of Iran
- Public access: Open
- Website: salfbase.ir

UNESCO World Heritage Site
- Official name: Sassanid Archaeological Landscape of Fars Region
- Type: Cultural
- Criteria: ii, iii, vi
- Designated: 2018 (42nd session)
- Reference no.: 1568
- Region: Asia-Pacific

Valerian Palace or Valerianus Palace is an ancient palace in the historical city of Bishapur in Kazerun County in Iran. This palace was built for Valerian, the Roman Emperor, to reside in as prisoner, within the royal citadel of Bishapur, after the victory of Shapur I, the Sasanian king, over Valerian, the Roman emperor, in the Battle of Edessa. Valerian Palace was registered in 1310 SH (Note: 1931-1932 in the Gregorian calendar) as one of the first national monuments of Iran. It is also listed as part of the Bishapur complex in the UNESCO World Heritage List.

== Location ==
This building is located on the northern side of the royal citadel, 150 meters from the ceremonial hall and the large fire temple located in the ancient city of Bishapur, one of the capitals of the Sasanian Empire, 15 kilometers west of the city of Kazerun.

== History ==
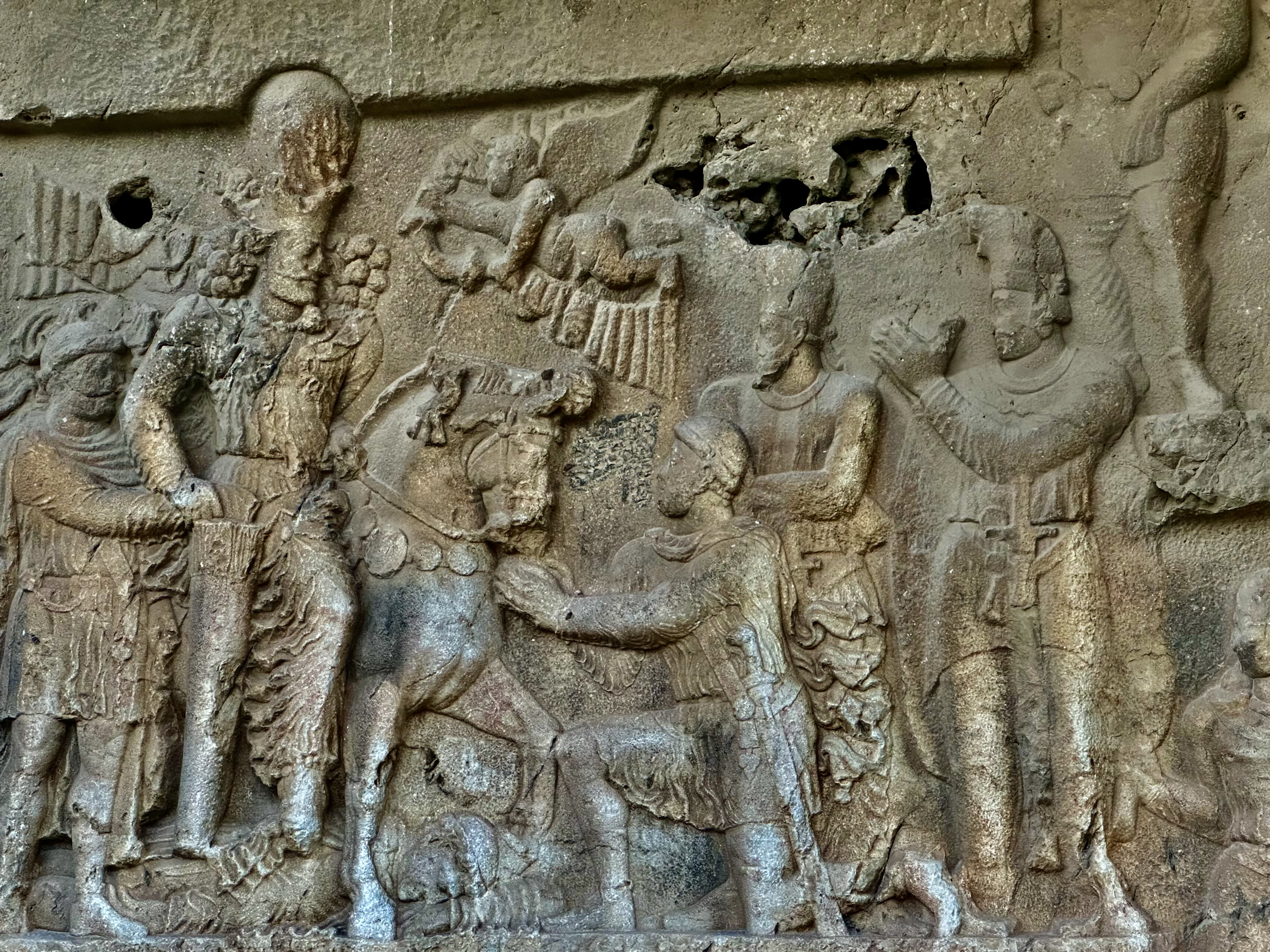
A relief in the Tang-e Chogan of Kazerun shows Valerian, the Roman emperor, kneeling before Shapur I, the Sassanid king of Iran.

This palace was built in 266 AD, after the Battle of Edessa, by order of Shapur I, the king of Iran, for the residence of Valerian, the Roman emperor who was defeated in this battle and taken prisoner, near the government palace of Shapur I. Valerian was kept under surveillance in this palace throughout his life. The first explorer of Valerian's palace was Roman Ghirshman, a French archaeologist who was engaged in excavations at Bishapur between 1935 and 1937. After that, between 1968 and 1974, excavations were carried out in Bishapur under the supervision of Ali Akbar Sarfaraz, an Iranian archaeologist. In this operation, excavations were carried out from the royal citadel. Finally, in 1995, the operation to liberate the Valerian Palace was carried out under the supervision of Mosayeb Amiri. In 2025, cultural heritage officials announced the start of a new season of excavations in Bishapur, focusing on Valerian Palace.

== Architecture ==
Valerian Palace was built in the Sasanian architecture style. This building is made entirely of solid and patterned stones. The entrance facade of this palace is similar to the interior of the Temple of Anahita. Its interior wall is made of carved and patterned stones and the exterior surface is whitewashed with plaster. All parts of this palace also had reliefs and luxurious stuccoes. Some of the notable stuccoes and paintings can be seen in the Bishapur Museum. This palace was built in an octagonal shape and opened to the courtyard by four corridors.

== Resources ==
- Ruins of Valerian’s palace to undergo archaeological excavation
