= Fars (territory) =

Territory in ancient Iran

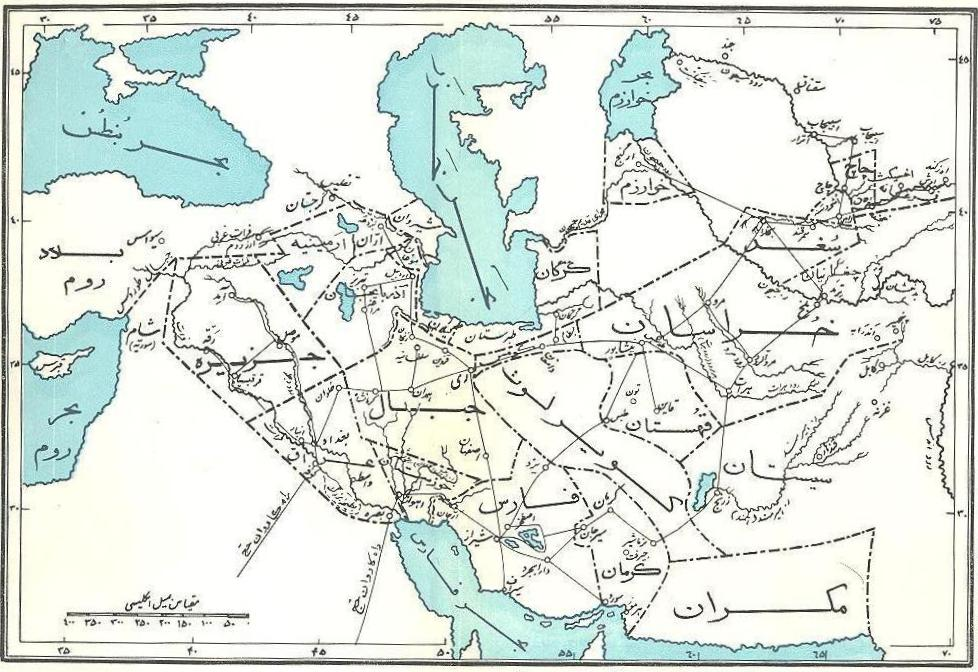
The position of Fars in map of Iran in the era of Abbasid Caliphate taken from the book of The Lands of The Eastern Caliphate

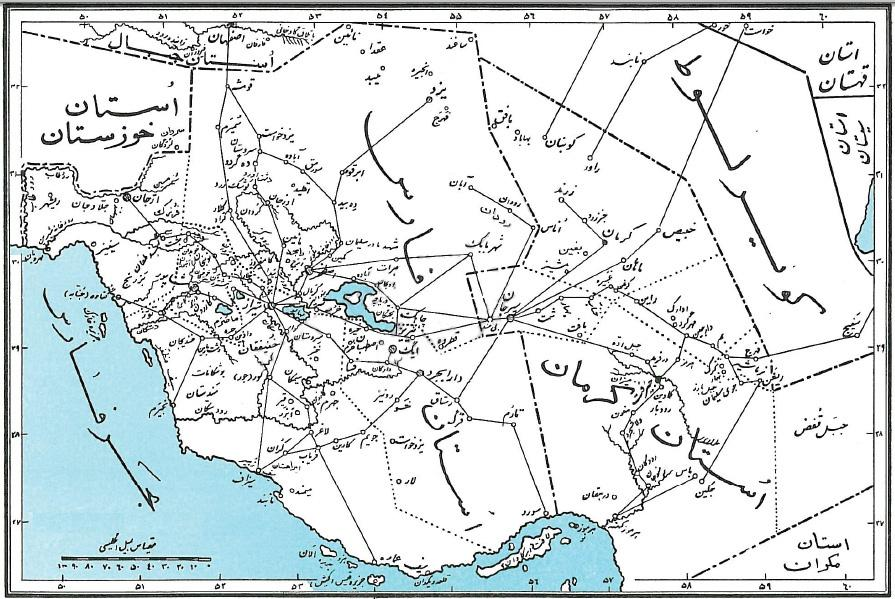
The position of Fars on the shores of the Persian Gulf in the era of Abbasid Caliphate taken from the book of The Lands of The Eastern Caliphate

Fars territory or Ancient Persia (Persian: سرزمین فارس یا پارس کهن, in Old Persian: 𐎱𐎠𐎼𐎿 (Pārsa)) is in the southern part of Iran leading to the Persian Gulf, which has historical, continental, cultural and especially dialectal commonalities and includes the provinces of Khuzestan, Fars, Esfahan, Bushehr, Kohgiluyeh and Boyer-Ahmad, Hormozgan and Chaharmahal and Bakhtiari and the western part of Kerman province, which is known as the origin of Persian language and inherited from Middle Persian. Which is still culturally and linguistically distinct to this day.

In 558 BC, Cyrus the Great (Cyrus II) was born in Anshan (Persia), somewhere between the cities Izeh in the northeast of Khuzestan and the southwest of Chaharmahal and Bakhtiari. The Cyrus the Great founded Satrap of Persia (in place of present-day Marvdasht, north of Fars province), then he moved Achaemenid Empire capital to Susa.

== Linguistic cultural commonalities ==
One of the most important commonalities of the Fars territory is language and dialect. This region is the origin of Persian language and in addition to that, the forms of the old Pahlavi dialect have remained in it until today. Pahlavi dialects still retain the Middle Persian dialect. Their most important feature is having a metaphorical and ergative split mode, and like the Sassanid Pahlavi verb, the morphological identities are still placed before the verb. Apart from this, there is no other special difference with Persian. These dialects are common in Fars province, Dashti region in Bushehr province and Behbahan in Khuzestan and a few villages in Kohgiluyeh and Boyer-Ahmad and Hormozgan except in the east of the province where Balochi language is used. Most of the users of Pahlavi dialects in Fars province live in the villages of Koohmareh in Arzhan District, and Dashtak of Marvdasht and the villages around Kazerun and Bishapur and Larestan County. The old Shiraz dialect, to which Hafez and Saadi have poems, is also of the same dialect, which, like Persian, is a remnant of the South Pahlavi language.

== Historical geography of Fars ==
The Fars territory or Ancient Persia or in terms of political history in the Sasanian Empire era and early Islamic period was a state and included the current provinces of Fars, Bushehr province, Hormozgan, Kohgiluyeh and Boyer-Ahmad and even Yazd province and Behbahan County of Khuzestan province. Ibn Hawqal considered the borders of this state from the east to Kerman, from the west to Khuzestan and from the north to the desert leading to Khorasan and part of Isfahan and from the south adjacent to the Persian Gulf. Until the last century, the Fars territory was considered as an integrated state in terms of political division with differences compared to the past.

=== Divisions of Fars state ===
The pre-Islamic state of Fars was divided into five Kooreh or Khwarrah (for Kooreh or Khwarrah, various meanings are mentioned, including lighting, city, province and state). These five Khwarrah, which were also established in the post-Islamic period, are:

- Istakhr Khwarrah, whose capital was the Istakhr and the city of Persepolis was one of its county.
- Darabgerd Khwarrah, whose capital was the Darabgerd city.
- Ardashir-Khwarrah, whose capital was the city of Gor (current Firuzabad).
- Shapur-Khwarrah, whose capital was the city of Bishapur (18 kilometer far from the current Kazerun).
- Qobad Khwarrah, whose capital was the city of Arrajan (near current Behbahan).

Some of important cities of the state of Fars: Shiraz, Nai Zi (Neyriz), Siraf, Arrajan (current Behbahan), and...

Other ancient cities of the state of Fars: Gor, Istakhr, Darabgerd, Bishapur, Arrajan, Siraf, Kaseh, Janabeh, Mahrooyan, Qondejan, Shush, Tawwaj, Nobandjan, Beyza, Yazd-e Khāst, Juyom, Ij, Najirom, Rishehr, Siniz, Neyriz, Qatruyeh, Temukan, Meshkan, Persepolis, Paishiyauvada, Liyan.

== See also ==
- Persis
