= Mosaic Ayvan =

UNESCO world heritage site in Iran

Ayvān-e Mosaic
UNESCO World Heritage Site
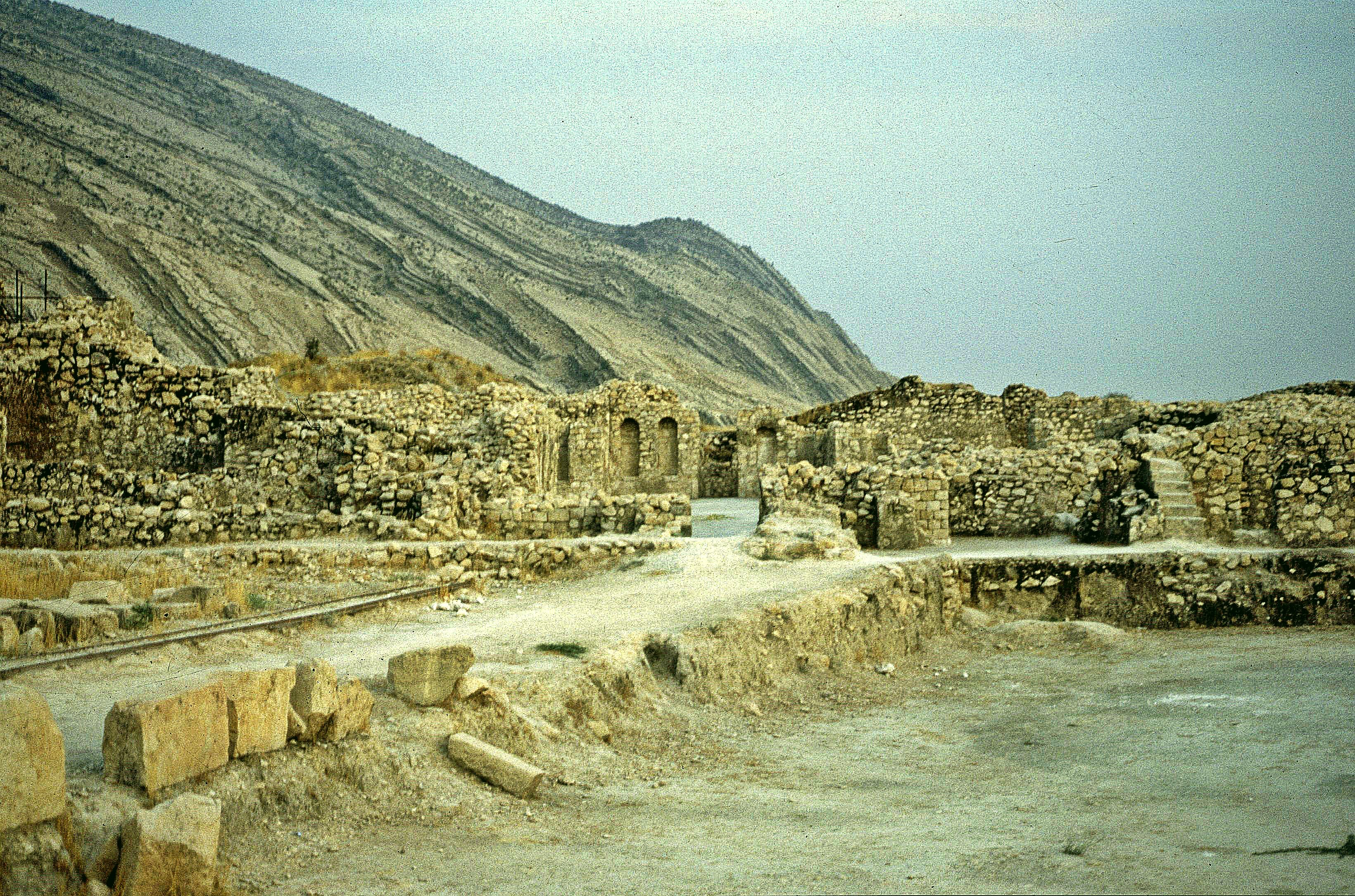
- Ayvān-e Mosaic in Bishapur

- Location within Iran
- Interactive map of Ayvān-e Mosaic
- Location: Iran, Kazerun, the ancient city of Bishapur
- Criteria: Cultural: ii, iii, vi
- Reference: 1568
- Inscription: 2018 (42nd Session)
- Coordinates: 29.7800384°N 51.5764580°E

Images

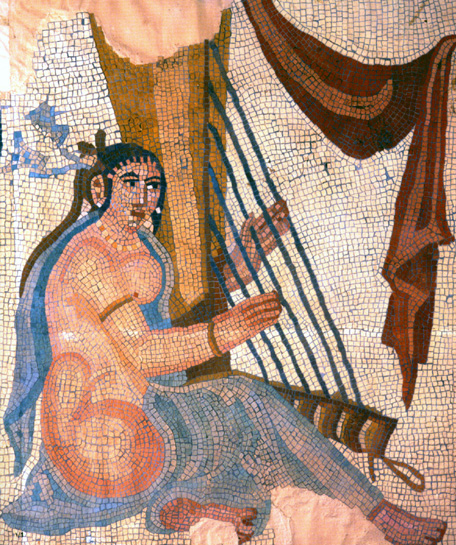
Mosaic of a Sasanian harpist woman, discovered in Ayvān-e Mosaic and now kept in the Louvre Museum.

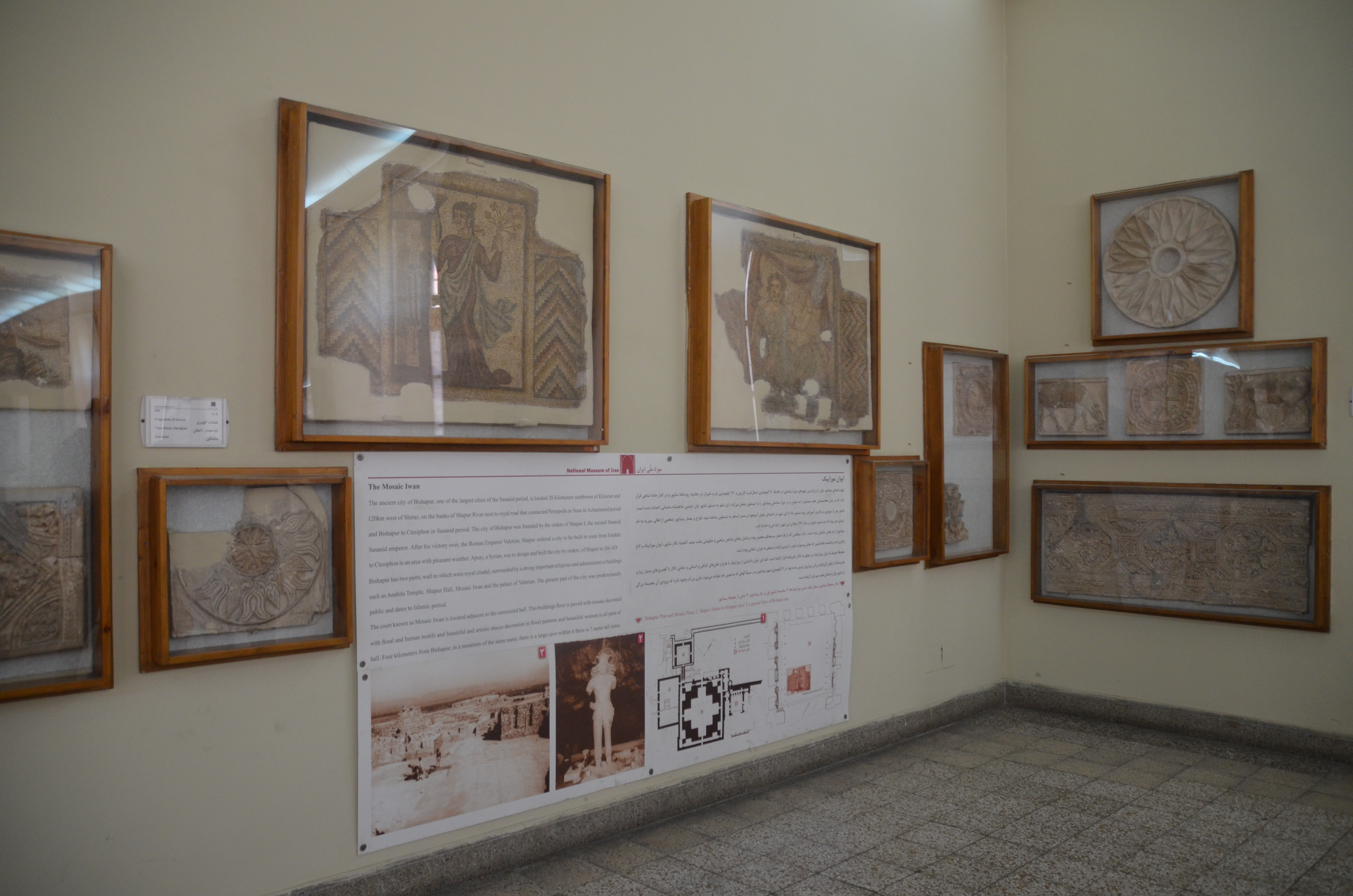
Mosaics from Bishapur exhibited at the National Museum of Iran.

The Mosaic Ayvan (Persian: ایوان موزائیک, romanized: Ayvān-e Mosaic or Ivān-e Mosaic) is one of the architectural structures of the ancient city of Bishapur, located in Kazerun County, Iran. The structure was built in the 3rd century CE by order of Shapur I, the second king of the Sasanian Empire. Ayvān-e Mosaic was registered in 1931 as one of the earliest entries on the Iran National Heritage List. It is also inscribed as part of the Bishapur ensemble on the UNESCO World Heritage List.

== Location ==
Ayvān-e Mosaic is situated at the end of the eastern and western corridors of the Ceremonial Hall, adjacent to the great fire temple in the northeastern part of ancient Bishapur — one of the capitals of the Sasanian Empire — located 15 km west of Kazerun.

== History and function ==
Ayvān-e Mosaic was constructed in the second half of the 3rd century CE by order of Shapur I. The space is believed to have served as the private residence or secluded chamber of the Sasanian king.

The first excavator of the structure was the French archaeologist Roman Ghirshman, who described the mosaics in his book Iran: Parthian and Sassanian Art. During excavations led by Iranian archaeologist Ali Akbar Sarfaraz beginning in 1974, debris was removed from the iwan and its surrounding area.

== Architecture ==
The structure consists of two opposing iwans, each featuring arched vaults, stucco decorations, and painted ornamentation. The floors were covered with mosaic carpets composed of human and vegetal motifs.

The lateral surfaces of the iwans were decorated with stucco pseudo-columns painted in red, black-bordered, and blue-banded patterns.

The western iwan represents a masterpiece of Sasanian architectural design and decorative art. It overlooks a rectangular courtyard measuring approximately 33 meters in length and 20 meters in width. The courtyard itself was once adorned with intricate mosaics depicting floral and human figures, arranged over a layer of mortar using small colored tesserae, creating a carpet-like mosaic.

The mosaic themes include a crown-braiding woman, a harpist woman, and various vegetal and anthropomorphic designs.

== Gallery ==
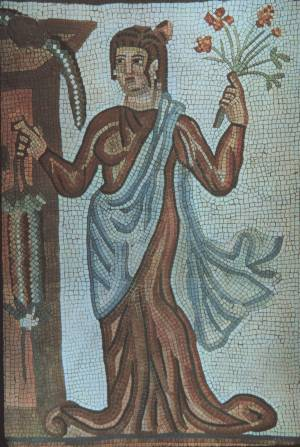

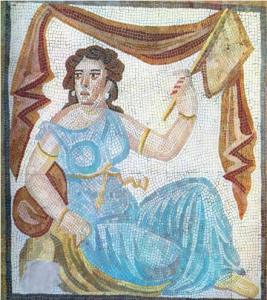

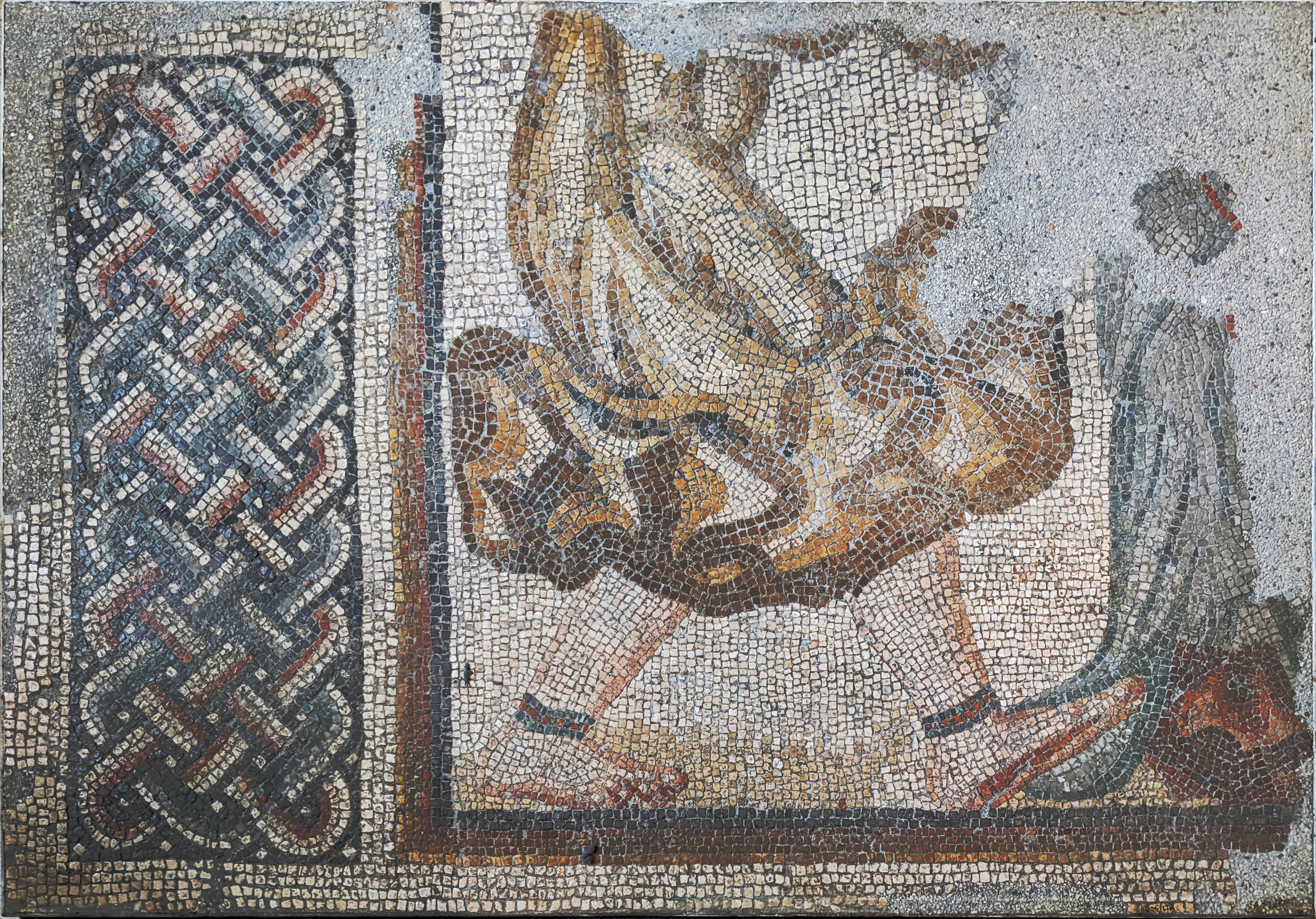

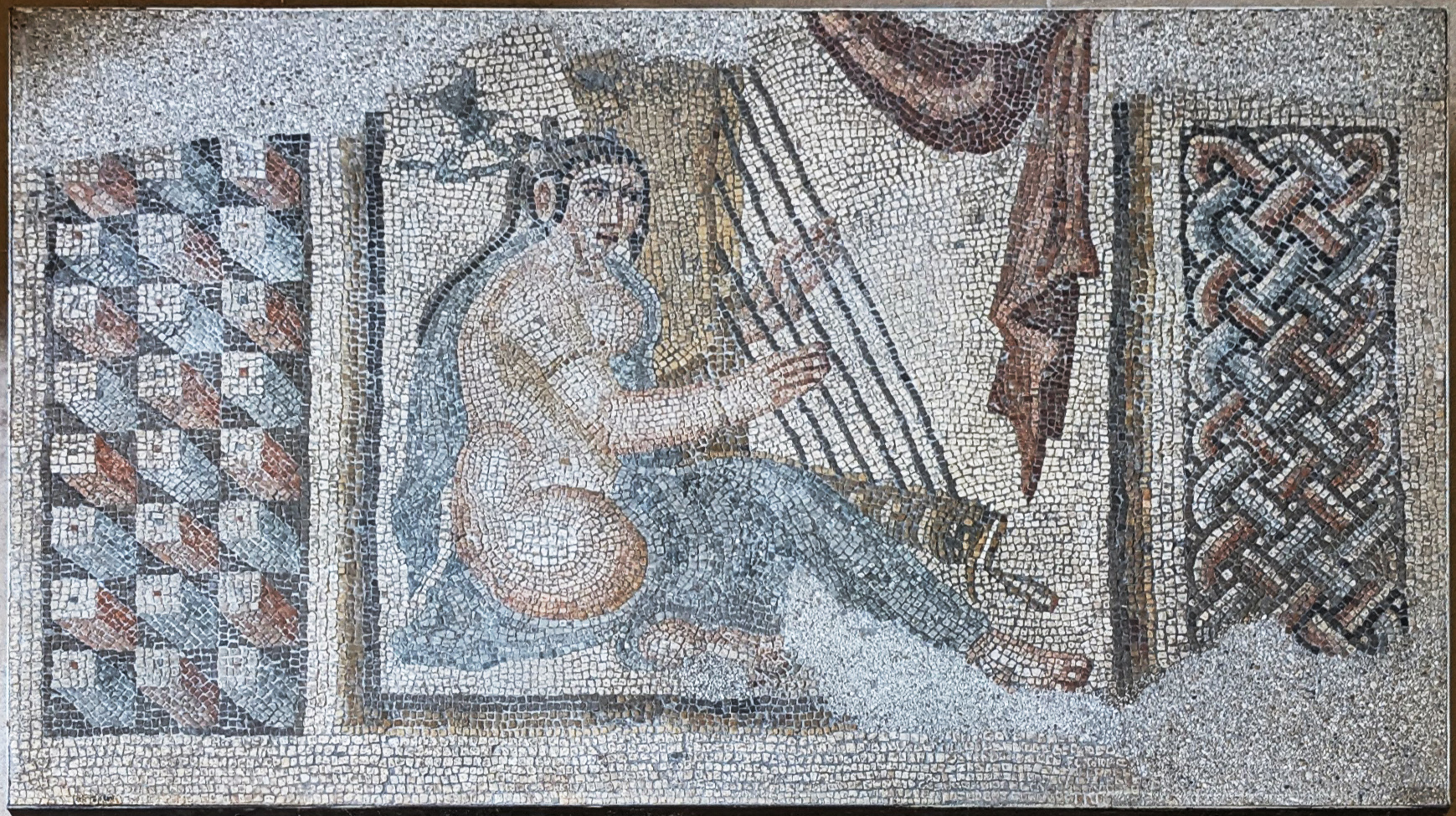

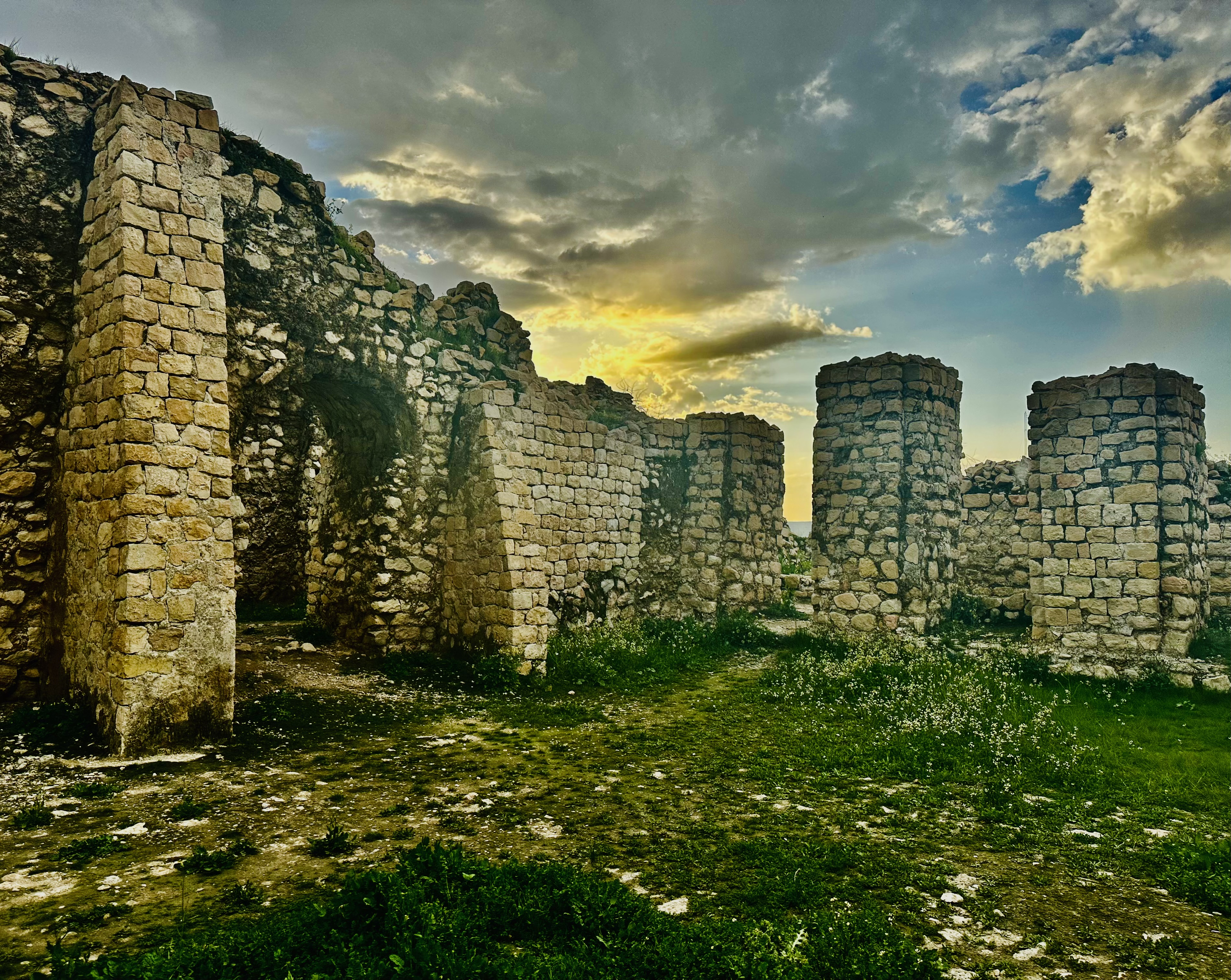

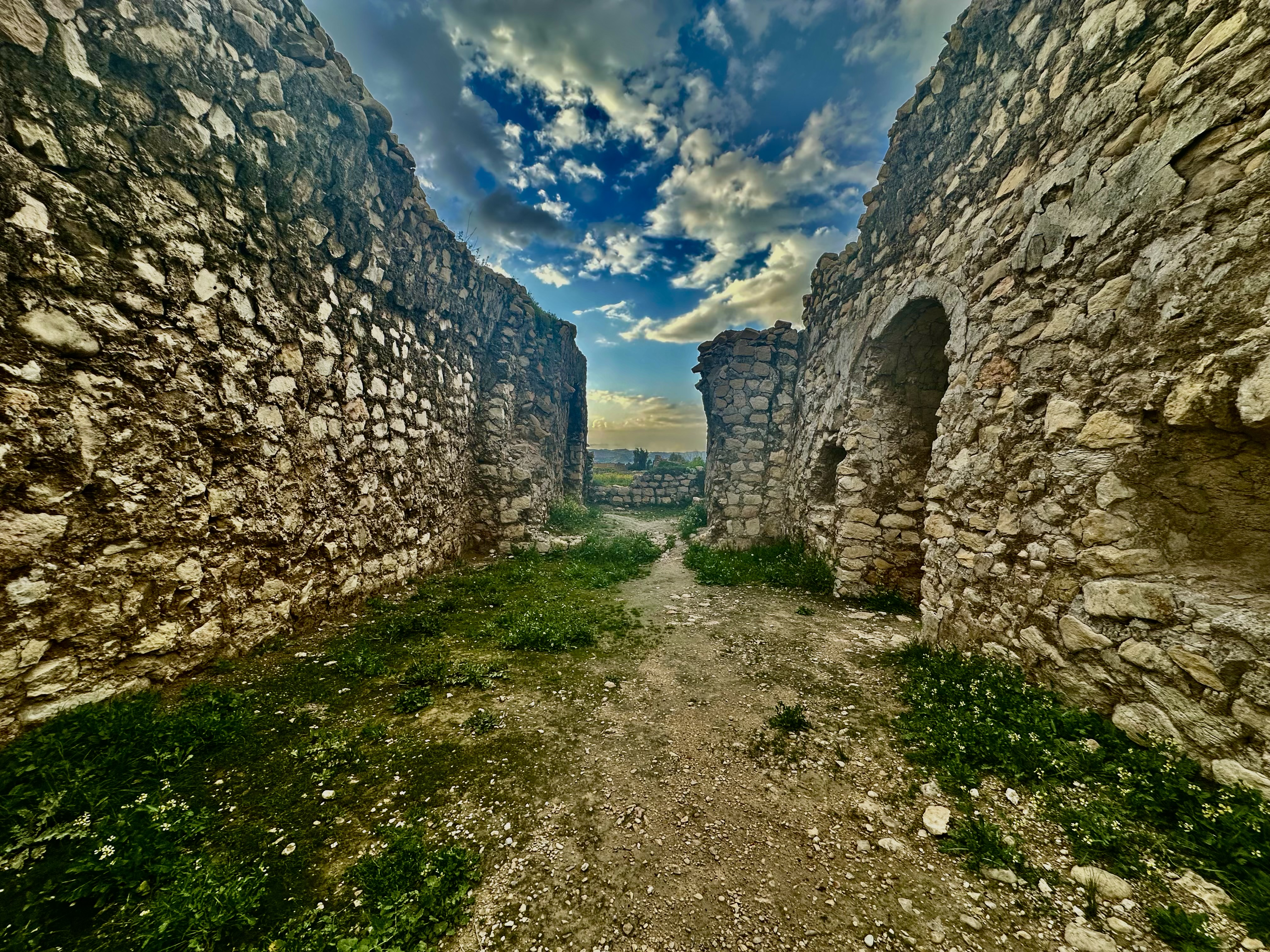

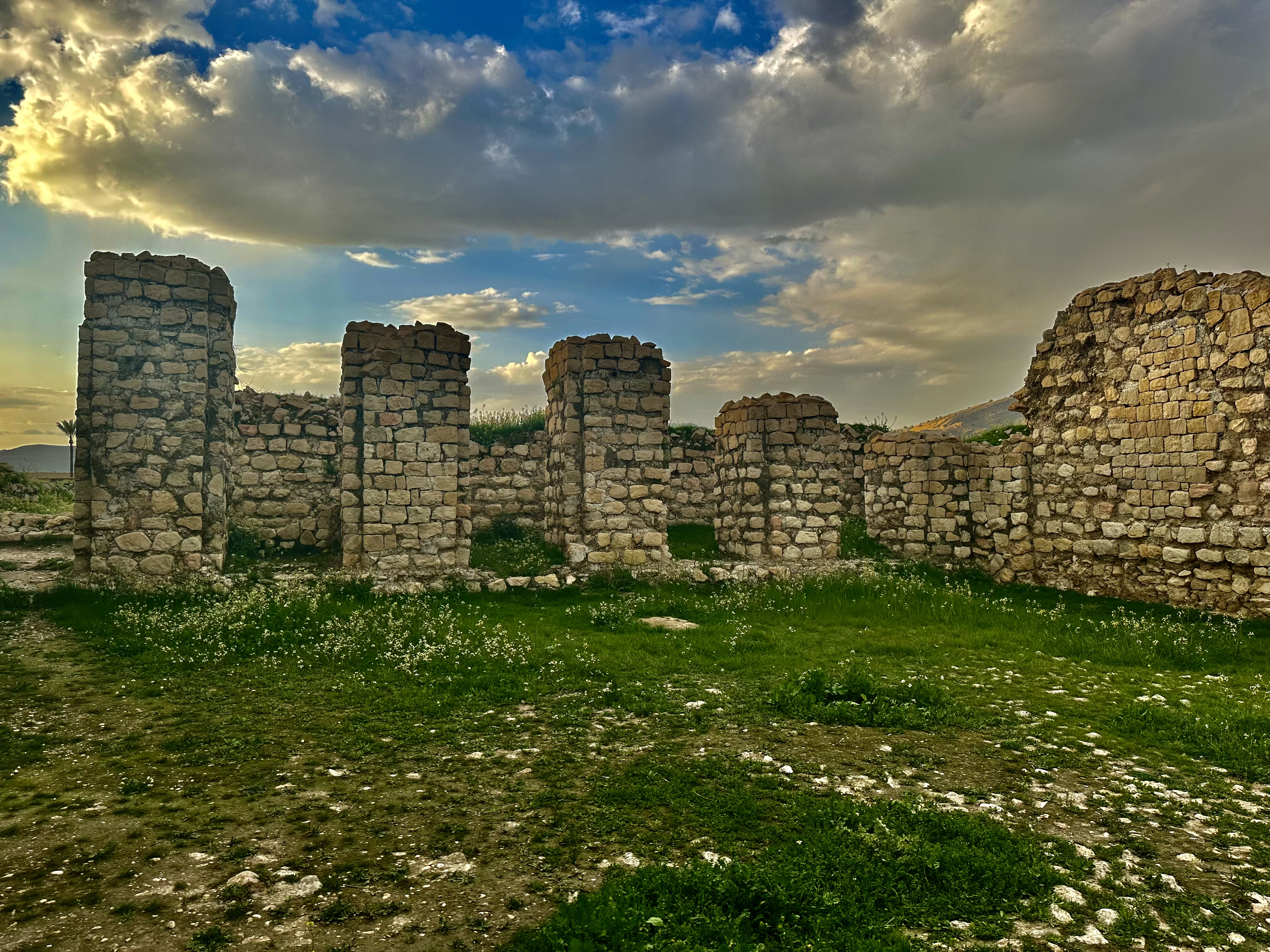

== Sources ==
- Bakhshandehfard, H. R. (2019). "The Mosaic Iwan in the City of Bishapur: The Role of Virtual Reconstruction in the Protection of Historical Monuments". SID. Scientific Information Database.
- Hagan, S. A. (2023). "Persianist Readings of Late Roman Wall Decoration". Arts. 12 (3). MDPI: 102. doi:10.3390/arts12030102.
- "Bishapur". Encyclopaedia Britannica. Britannica.
- "Bishapur – Palace". Livius.org. Livius: Articles on Ancient History.
