= Khatunabad, Sarab =

Khatunabad خاتون اباد
- Village
- Location within Iran
- Coordinates: 37°56′24″N 47°23′16″E
- Country: Iran
- Province: East Azerbaijan
- County: Sarab
- Bakhsh: Central
- Rural District: Abarghan

Population (2006)
  - Total: 197
- Time zone: UTC+3:30 (IRST)
  - Summer (DST): UTC+4:30 (IRDT)

Khatunabad (Persian: خاتون اباد, also Romanized as Khātūnābād) is a village in Abarghan Rural District, in the Central District of Sarab County, East Azerbaijan Province, Iran. At the 2006 census, its population was 197, in 43 families.
