= Khatunabad, Dehaj =

Khatunabad خاتون اباد
- Village
- Country: Iran
- Province: Kerman
- County: Shahr-e Babak
- Bakhsh: Dehaj
- Rural District: Dehaj

Population (2006)
  - Total: 82
- Time zone: UTC+3:30 (IRST)
  - Summer (DST): UTC+4:30 (IRDT)

Khatunabad (Persian: خاتون اباد, also Romanized as Khātūnābād) is a village in Dehaj Rural District, Dehaj District, Shahr-e Babak County, Kerman Province, Iran. At the 2006 census, its population was 82, in 21 families.
