= Khatunabad Rural District =

Khatunabad Rural District (Persian: دهستان خاتون آباد) may refer to:

- Khatunabad Rural District (Jiroft County)
- Khatunabad Rural District (Shahr-e Babak County)
