= Boland Pey =

Boland Pey بلندپي
- Village
- Location within Iran
- Coordinates: 35°53′23″N 59°31′05″E
- Country: Iran
- Province: Razavi Khorasan
- County: Mashhad
- Bakhsh: Ahmadabad
- Rural District: Sarjam

Population (2006)
  - Total: 206
- Time zone: UTC+3:30 (IRST)
  - Summer (DST): UTC+4:30 (IRDT)

Boland Pey (Persian: بلندپي; also known as Khātūnābād, Khātūnābād-e Boland Pey, Boland Pāyeh, and Būland Pāya) is a village in Sarjam Rural District, Ahmadabad District, Mashhad County, Razavi Khorasan Province, Iran. At the 2006 census, its population was 206, in 53 families.
