= Khatunabad-e Mohimi =

Khatunabad-e Mohimi خاتون ابادمهيمي
- Village
- Location within Iran
- Coordinates: 28°19′47″N 57°51′05″E
- Country: Iran
- Province: Kerman
- County: Anbarabad
- Bakhsh: Central
- Rural District: Jahadabad

Population (2006)
  - Total: 13
- Time zone: UTC+3:30 (IRST)
  - Summer (DST): UTC+4:30 (IRDT)

Khatunabad-e Mohimi (Persian: خاتون ابادمهيمي, also Romanized as Khātūnābād-e Mohīmī; also known as Khatoon Abad Hoomeh, Khātūnābād, and Khātūnābād-e Hūmeh) is a village in Jahadabad Rural District, in the Central District of Anbarabad County, Kerman Province, Iran. At the 2006 census, its population was 13, in 4 families.
