= Ali Akbar Sarfaraz =

Iranian archaeologist (1927–2024)

Ali Akbar Sarfaraz (Persian: علی‌اکبر سرافراز; 1927 – 9 February 2024) was an Iranian archaeologist.

Sarfaraz was once a member of the Archaeological Service of Iran.

In 1962, Sarfaraz was a member of a team that excavated an Iron Age site in Yanik Tepe. The excavation uncovered an artifact made of bone and resembling a pair of spectacles buried with the body of a girl. If, as Sarfaraz hypothesized, this artifact once held lenses, they would represent the earliest known use of corrective lenses.

From 1976 to 1977, Sarfaraz led a "rescue excavation" at Khatunban after artifacts plundered from the site were confiscated. In 1999, Sarfaraz directed the excavation of Charkhab Palace of Cyrus the Great.

Sarfaraz died on 9 February 2024, at the age of 96.
