= Khatunabad, Anbarabad =

Khatunabad خاتون اباد
- Village
- Location within Iran
- Coordinates: 28°25′38″N 57°47′30″E
- Country: Iran
- Province: Kerman
- County: Anbarabad
- Bakhsh: Central
- Rural District: Aliabad

Population (2006)
  - Total: 859
- Time zone: UTC+3:30 (IRST)
  - Summer (DST): UTC+4:30 (IRDT)

Khatunabad (Persian: خاتون اباد, also Romanized as Khātūnābād; also known as Khatoon Abad Hoomeh and Khātūnābād-e Hūmeh) is a village in Aliabad Rural District, in the Central District of Anbarabad County, Kerman Province, Iran. At the 2006 census, its population was 859, in 180 families.
