= Khatunabad, Lorestan =

Khatunabad خاتون آباد
- Village
- Location within Iran
- Coordinates: 34°06′50″N 47°50′11″E
- Country: Iran
- Province: Lorestan
- County: Delfan
- Bakhsh: Central
- Rural District: Nurabad

Population (2006)
  - Total: 114
- Time zone: UTC+3:30 (IRST)
  - Summer (DST): UTC+4:30 (IRDT)

Khatunabad (Persian: خاتون آباد, also Romanized as Khātūnābād; also known as Khātūnbān) is a village in Nurabad Rural District, in the Central District of Delfan County, Lorestan Province, Iran. At the 2006 census, its population was 114, in 20 families.
