= Shapur-Khwarrah =

Former administrative division

Map of Sasanian Pars.

Shapur-Khwarrah (Middle Persian: Šāhpuhr-Xwarra, meaning "glory of Shapur") was one of the four (later five) administrative divisions of the Sasanian province of Pars. The other administrative divisions were Ardashir-Khwarrah, Istakhr and Darabgerd, while a fifth named Arrajan was founded in the early 6th century by Kavadh I (r. 498–531).

== Sources ==
- Bosworth, C. E. (1986). "ARDAŠĪR-ḴORRA". Encyclopaedia Iranica, Vol. II, Fasc. 4. pp. 384–385.
- Miri, Negin (2009). "Historical Geography of Fars during the Sasanian Period" (PDF). Sasanika. University of Sydney. pp. 1–65. Archived from the original (PDF) on 2016-04-04.
