= Battle of Bishapur (643–644) =

643–644 battle

- Part of Islamic conquest of Persia
Date	643–644
Location	Fars
Result	Rashidun victory

Belligerents
Sasanian Empire	Rashidun Caliphate

Commanders and leaders
Shahrak †	Uthman ibn Abi al-As

Casualties and losses
40,000 nobles	

The Battle of Bishapur took place during the Muslim conquest of Fars, a province of Persia, in the seventh century AD. The city was taken by the Muslim Rashidun forces after a siege.

== Battle ==
The battle ended the siege by Maja'a bin Masud's troops of the former city of Bishapur, known to the Arabs as Sabur. In c. 643 Uthman ibn Abi al-As arrived at Bishapur with reinforcements from Basra and besieged the fortified town for several weeks before the town was forced to surrender. He then made a peace treaty with the inhabitants of the city. Further waves of reinforcements arrived under Sariyah bin Zuinem, then followed by forces under Suhail bin Adi, and lastly Asim bin Amr arrived in the region to completely pacify Kerman.

== Subsequent events ==
In 644, al-'Ala' ibn al-Hadrami, the Rashidun governor of Bahrain, once again attacked Fars, reaching as far as Estakhr, until he was repelled by the governor (marzban) of Fars, Shahrak. (Note: Another source, Kennedy, suggests that Shahrak himself was killed earlier, at the start of Muslim campaign in Fars, in Rashahr in 640 while attempting to repel the Muslim advance.) Some time later, Uthman ibn Abi al-As managed to establish at Tawwaj a Misr, a military base whose regimental system was based on the Immigrant Tribal (mainly Arabs) system, and shortly defeated and killed Shahrak near Rew-shahr (however other sources state that it was his brother who did it). A Persian convert to Islam, Hormuz ibn Hayyan al-'Abdi, was shortly sent by Uthman ibn Abi al-'As to attack a fortress known as Senez on the coast of Fars. After the accession of Uthman ibn Affan as the new Caliph of the Rashidun Caliphate on 11 November 644, the inhabitants of Bishapur, under the leadership of Shahrak's brother, declared independence, but were defeated. (Note: The date for this revolt remains disputed, as the Persian historian al-Baladhuri states that it occurred in 646.)

== Sources ==
- Kennedy, Hugh (2007). The Great Arab Conquests: How the Spread of Islam Changed the World We Live In. Philadelphia, Pennsylvania: Da Capo Press. ISBN 978-0-306-81740-3.
