= Expedition of Khalid ibn Sa'id =

- Part of the Muslim conquest of the Levant
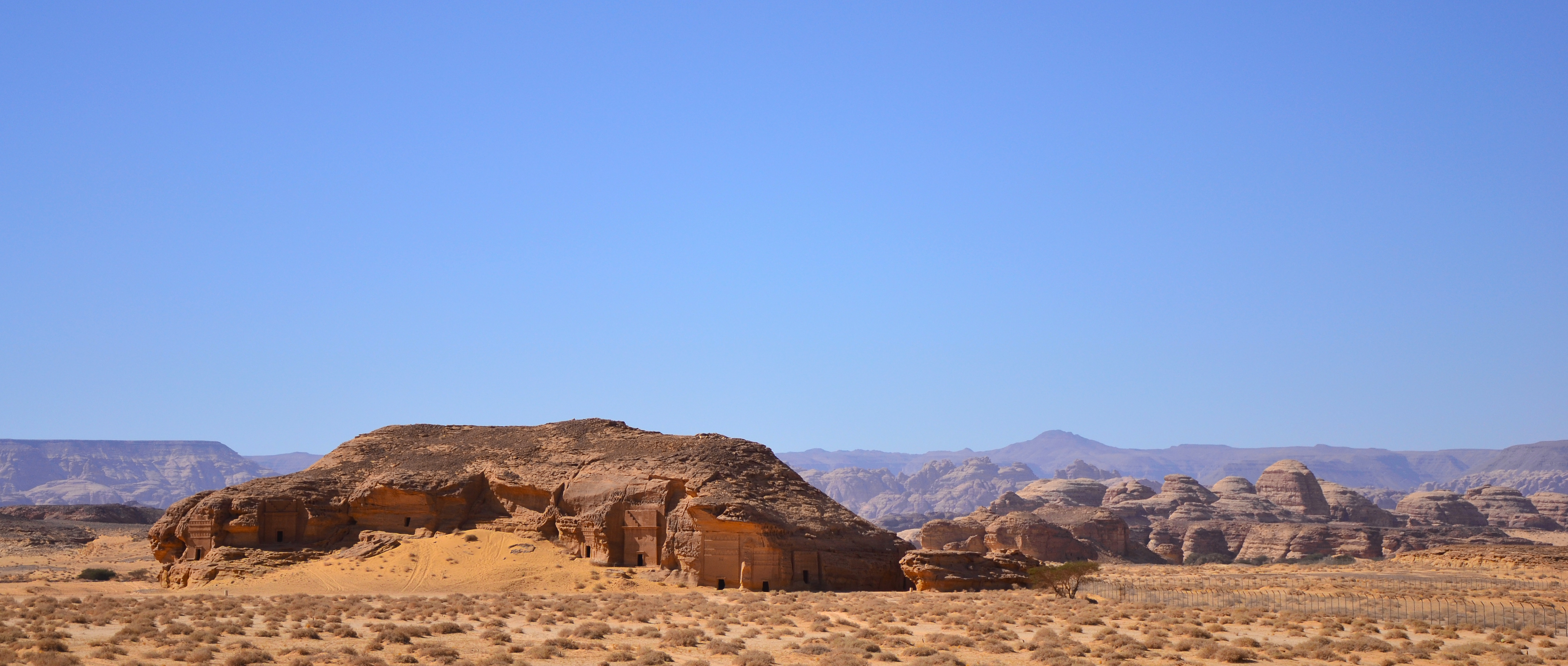
- Landscape near Tayma
| Date | July 632 – early 634 |
| Location | Tayma, Al Qastal and Marj al-Saffar, modern day Saudi Arabia, Jordan and Syria |
| Result | Byzantine victory |
| Territorial changes | Temporary Rashidun retreat from the Byzantine frontier |

Belligerents
| Rashidun Caliphate | Byzantine Empire; Ghassanids; Tanukhids; Salibs; Judham; Lakhmids |

Commanders and leaders
| Khalid ibn Sa'id †; Dhu al-Kala al-Himyari; Ikrima ibn Amr; Al-Walid ibn Uqba; Umm Hakim bint al-Harith; Sa'id ibn Khalid | Heraclius (Indirectly); Theodore (Note: As the Viceroy of the East, Theodore was the supreme theater commander. Without his signature and authority, the local forces could not have legally mobilized to fight the Muslims.); Vahan |

Strength
| More than 15,000 (initially) | 20,000 initially 16,000 at Marj al-Saffar |

Casualties and losses
| Heavy: 9,000 survived | Moderate |

The Expedition of Khalid ibn Sa'id was a military campaign conducted by the Rashidun Caliphate against the Byzantine Empire in late 633 or in early 634, under the command of Khalid ibn Sa’id. The Muslims were able to obtain initial success by defeating a Byzantine-allied Arab christian force at Tayma. However, the campaign ultimately ended in a disastrous failure, as Khalid was eventually defeated by the Byzantine commander Vahan at Marj al-Saffar, south of Damascus in Syria.

== Background ==
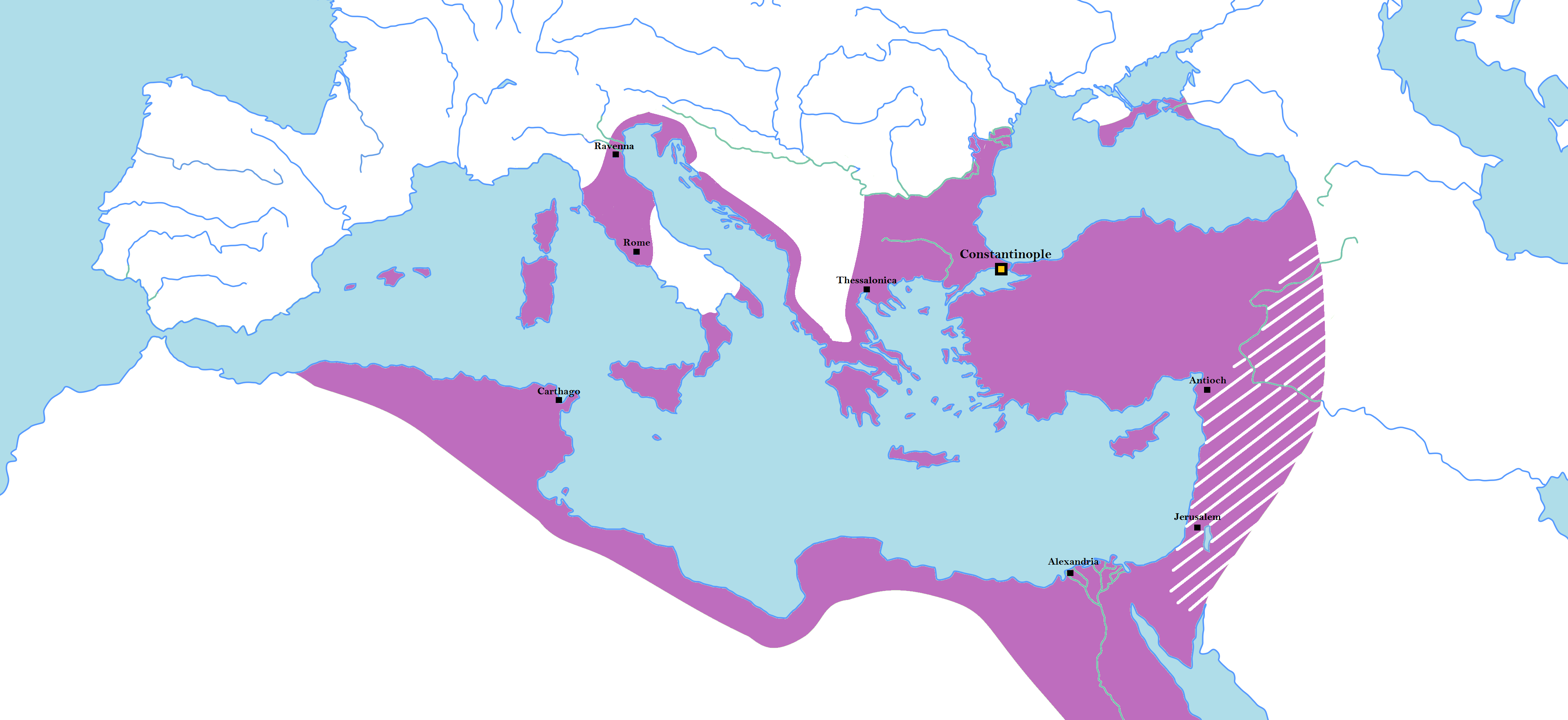
The Byzantine Empire in 626, during the Byzantine-Sasanian War

Conquests of Muhammad (black lines) and conquests of the Rashidun caliphs (green lines)

Following the end of the Ridda Wars, Abu Bakr consolidated and expanded his realm within the entire Arabian Peninsula. He sent the companion of Muhammad, Khalid ibn Sa'id with a preliminary volunteer force to set up camp at Tayma, strictly ordering him not to initiate battle or march into enemy territory unless explicitly authorized, and to act as a buffer while gathering local Bedouin tribes and closely observe any Byzantine movements. Khalid initially advanced with his own retinue, after which a string of reinforcements gradually joined him. One of these additional contingents was led by Al-Walid ibn Uqba. Khalid was consequently able to concentrate a sizeable army in the region, plausibly over 15,000 strong.

== Campaign ==
=== Opening moves ===
While stationed at Tayma, Khalid observed the local Christian-Arab tribes mobilizing under the Byzantine allied chieftain Mahan. The Byzantines had learned of the Rashidun buildup near Tayma, and consequently began mustering their own forces. The Byzantine army consisted of both regular troops and significant quantities of Arab foederati, who were drawn from the Ghassanid, Tanukhid, Salib, Judham and even Lakhmid tribal groupings, likely exceeding 20,000. On the basis of al-Tabari, Emperor Heraclius resided at Jerusalem at the time of Khalid's expedition, having made a pilgrimage there following the end of the war with Persia. It is likely that he was the mastermind of Roman operations at the time, with part of the reason behind his journey to Palestine being to strengthen the frontier defences and amass a powerful Byzantine army in the area. When Khalid learned of the Byzantine preparations, he dispatched a letter to Abu Bakr, who ordered Khalid to conduct a pre-emptive attack against the Byzantines. The first forces to confront Khalid were the Arab foederati in Byzantine service. However, upon witnessing Khalid's impressive army drawn up in combat formation, many of these foederati defected to the Rashiduns and embraced Islam. (Note: These Federate Arab elements may have been conspiring with the Rashiduns beforehand, likely informing them of the Byzantine preparations before Khalid's expedition began.) The remainder of the Byzantine army retreated following the betrayal.

=== Battle of Al Qastal ===
Khalid dispatched a messenger to inform the caliph of this development, and Abu Bakr responded with an order for Khalid to advance but to avoid attacking too deep into Byzantine territory, so as not to allow his army to be cut off. Khalid promptly marched towards the border with the empire and arrived near the site of Al Qastal. There he met the Byzantine army, which had regrouped under the command of the Armenian general Vahan. This time a battle was joined, wherein the Arabs gained the upper hand and defeated the Byzantine army. However, the Rashiduns sustained severe casualties even in victory, prompting Khalid to dispatch a request to Abu Bakr for reinforcements. Khalid's warriors also sought to retire from service under him, possibly dissatisfied with his leadership or exhausted after the battle of Al Qastal. However, the caliph duly granted Khalid's request with the dispatch of elite warriors from Yemen. This replacement army included two prominent commanders, Dhu al-Kala and Ikrima ibn Amr.

=== Battle of Marj al-Saffar ===
Once the supplementary Yemeni troops arrived, Khalid ibn Sa'id immediately sought to exploit his earlier victory and begin a rapid advance towards Damascus. When the Rashidun army approached the opposing Byzantine forces, who had once again regrouped, Vahan feigned flight in the direction of Damascus to lure Khalid ibn Sa'id to press further in his bold advance into Syria. At Marj al-Saffar Vahan's forces suddenly turned about to fight the Rashiduns, while hidden troops posted previously in ambushing positions emerged and began surrounding the Muslim flanks. The Byzantines had concealed two unknown droungarioi commanding 4,000 men apiece, which along with the contingent feigning flight under Vahan himself, may have formed a total strength of around 16,000 men for the Byzantine army at Marj al-Saffar. During the unexpected counterattack, Khalid's son, Sa'id ibn Khalid, was killed. Khalid himself fled the battlefield with the remnants of his troops routing with him. However, Ikrima was able to rally 6,000 warriors to perform an effective fighting retreat, preventing the total annihilation of the Rashidun army. Thus, the Byzantines had managed to repulse the first major Rashidun offensive into the Levant, though they had not been able to fully exploit their victory. (Note: Some modern scholars cast doubt on the validity of Khalid ibn Sa'id's Campaign recorded byal-Tabari. William Muir was cautious of claim that the Muslims reached the vicinity of Marj al-Saffar near Damascus on this occasion, and considers it possible that there was confusion between Khalid's defeat and a later battle fought there. Fred M. Donner also considered the claims of Khalid's defeat at Marj al-Saffar to be confused accounts of a later battle fought at the same place. However, Donner reasons that Khalid and his reinforcement army likely sustained a military defeat against the Byzantines leading to his withdrawal to Wadi al-Qura and subsequent dismissal by the Caliph. Ilkka Syvänne accepts al-Tabari's recording of events in his reconstruction, combining information provided by him and al-Azdi (who records the beginning of Khalid's expedition but not his subsequent defeat by Vahan described by al-Tabari) as well as contextual evidence from Byzantine and Syriac sources. He also notes that the ability of Khalid ibn Sa'id to pierce as far as Marj al-Suffar may have contributed to his overconfidence and consequent defeat at the hands of the Byzantines. However, Syvänne also concedes that the available sources on these events are problematic. Blankinship raises the possibility that the later battle at Marj al-Saffar which was described by Khalifa ibn Khayyat in his 'Al-Tāʾrīk̲h̲' ('The Chronicle'), said to have been won by Khalid ibn al-Walid, was a distorted version of the narrative to conceal the crushing defeat suffered by Khalid ibn Sa'id's Rashidun army.)

== Aftermath ==
Following the disaster at Marj al-Saffar, Khalid retreated with 3,000 Rashidun survivors as far south as Wadi al-Qura. Ikrima and his 6,000 strong contingent, having narrowly avoided destruction via their rear-guard action, withdrew southwards, likely to the area between Ma'an and Ma'ab. Around this time, Shurahbil ibn Hasana had been dispatched back to the caliph by Khalid ibn al-Walid, who was engaged in fighting against the Sasanian Empire along the Mesopotamian frontier. Abu Bakr permitted Shurahbil to travel to Wadi al-Qura to collect some of the surviving troops under Khalid ibn Sa'id to add to his own retinue. Shurahbil journeyed to al-Qura, where he took most of the troops from Khalid ibn Sa'id. Abu Bakr mustered a new army and appointed Yazid ibn Abi Sufyan and his brother Mu'awiya as commanders, with the rest of Khalid ibn Sa'id's troops being assigned to him. Meanwhile, Ikrima and his troops would go on serve as part of next large Rashidun offensive against the Byzantines, attached to Shurahbil's column, in late 633 or early 634.

== Bibliography ==
- Muir, William (1892). The Caliphate: Its Rise, Decline And Fall from Original Sources. The Religious Tract Society.
- Syvänne, Ilkka (2022). The Military History of Late Rome AD 602–641. Pen and Sword. ISBN 978-1-39907-567-1.
- Donner, Fred M. (2014). The Early Islamic Conquests. Princeton University Press. ISBN 978-1-4008-4787-7.
- Blankinship, Khalid Yahya, ed. (1993). The History of al-Ṭabarī, Volume XI: The Challenge to the Empires. SUNY Series in Near Eastern Studies. Albany, New York: State University of New York Press. ISBN 978-0-7914-0851-3.
