= Arab conquest of Fars =

Early phase of the mid-7th-century Arab conquest of Iran

Arab conquest of Pars
- Part of Muslim conquest of Persia
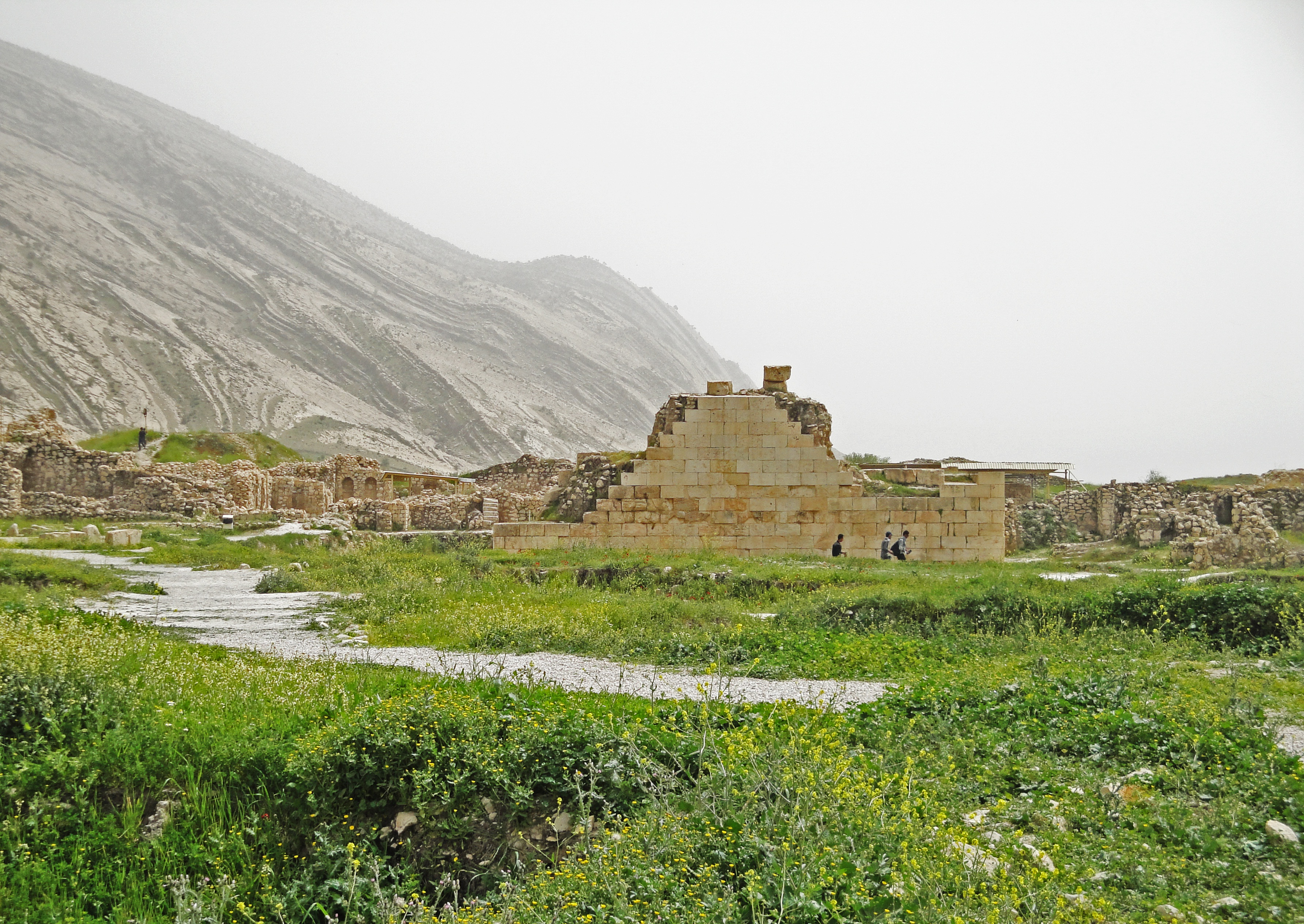
- Ruins of a Zoroastrian temple in Bishapur
| Date | 638/9–650/1 |
| Location | Pars |
| Result | Rashidun victory |

Belligerents
| Rashidun Caliphate | Sasanian Empire |

Commanders and leaders
| Uthman ibn Abi al-As al-Thaqafi; Al-Ala ibn al-Hadrami; Al-Jarud ibn al-Mu'alla †; Al-Sawwar ibn Hammam †; Khulayd ibn al-Mundhir ibn Sawa 'Ubayd Allah ibn Ma'mar † | Yazdegerd III; Shahrag †; Mahak (surrendered) |

Casualties and losses
| Unknown, probably heavy | Heavy |

The Arab conquest of Fars, or the Muslim conquest of Pars, took place from 638/9 to 650/1, and ended with subjugation of the Sasanian province of Pars, also known as Fars or Persis, by the Rashidun Caliphate.

The Arab invasion of Sasanian Pars took place in two phases. An initial Bahraini naval expedition in 638 ended in failure. After a change in Bahrain's governor, that unsuccessful campaign was followed with a second campaign conducted in 643 by a combined force of Arab tribesmen from Bahrain and Oman under the leadership of Uthman ibn Abi al-As al-Thaqafi that ultimately overran the province.

The Sasanian emperor Yazdegerd III, who had travelled to Pars to command the defense against the Arabs, was forced to flee to Kirman. This ended Sasanian control of the territory, though its population would later rebel several times against Arab rule.

== History ==
=== Initial expedition and Sasanian counter-attack ===
The Arab conquest of Pars began in 638/9, when the Rashidun governor of Bahrain at the time, al-'Ala' ibn al-Hadrami, led a naval expedition against the Sasanians without the permission of Umar.

The expedition proceeded to captured an island in the Persian Gulf, and, although al-'Ala' and the rest of the Arabs had been ordered to not invade Pars or its surrounding islands, he organized his army into three groups – one under Al-Jarud ibn Mu'alla, the second under Al-Sawwar ibn Hammam and the third under Khulayd ibn al-Mundhir ibn Sawa – and moved on the province. When the first group entered Pars, it was quickly defeated and al-Jarud was killed. The same thing soon happened to the second group. However, things proved to be more fortunate with the third group; Khulayd managed to keep them on bay, but was unable to withdraw back to Bahrain due to the Sasanians blocking his way to the sea. The Sasanians also burnt many of the ships of the Arab forces.

Umar, upon hearing of al-'Ala's ill-fated naval expedition against Pars, dismissed him as governor and reassigned him to the Sasanian front in Iraq, where he was placed under the command of his rival Sa'd ibn Abi Waqqas. The caliphal meanwhile ordered Utbah ibn Ghazwan to send reinforcements to assist Khulayd, who managed to withdraw back to Bahrain with some of his men, while the rest withdrew to Basra.

Al-'Ala was replaced as governor of Bahrain by Uthman ibn Abi al-As al-Thaqafi, who had earlier been appointed governor in 636 before being recalled to Ta'if in 637.

=== Second expedition and successful invasion ===
In ca. 643, Uthman ibn Abi al-As al-Thaqafi seized Bishapur, and made a peace treaty with the inhabitants of the city. In 19/644, al-'Ala' once again attacked Pars from Bahrain, reaching as far as Estakhr, until he was repelled by the governor (marzban) of Pars, Shahrag.

Al-Thaqafi later managed to establish a military base at Tawwaj, and shortly defeated and killed Shahrag near Rew-shahr, though some sources state that this action was carried out by his brother. A Persian convert to Islam, Hormoz ibn Hayyan al-'Abdi, was shortly sent by al-Thaqafi to attack a fortress known as Senez on the coast of Pars.

After the accession of Uthman ibn Affan as the new Caliph of the Rashidun Caliphate on 11 November, the inhabitants of Bishapur under the leadership of Shahrag's brother declared independence, but were defeated. The date for this revolt mains disputed, as the Persian historian al-Baladhuri states that it occurred in 646.

In 648, 'Abd-Allah ibn al-'Ash'ari forced the governor of Estakhr, Mahak, to surrender the city. However, this was not the final conquest of Estakhr, as the inhabitants of the city subsequently rebelled in 649/50 while its newly appointed governor, 'Abd-Allah ibn 'Amir was trying to capture Gor. During the insurrection, the military governor of the province, 'Ubayd Allah ibn Ma'mar, was defeated and killed.

In 650/1, the Sasanian emperor Yazdegerd III himself travelled to Estakhr to personally organize the defense against the Arabs, and after some time he went to Gor. In his absence, the defenses at Estakhr failed and the city was sacked by the Arabs, who killed over 40,000 defenders. The Arabs then quickly seized Gor, Kazerun and Siraf, while Yazdegerd III fled to Kirman. The flight of the emperor brought an end to the conflict and the Arab victory delivered the province into caliphal control. However, the inhabitants of the province would later rebel several times against Arab rule.

== Sources ==
- Baloch, Nabi Bakhsh Khan (July 1946). "The Probable Date of the First Arab Expeditions to India". Islamic Culture. 20 (3): 250–266.
- Daryaee, Touraj (1986). Collapse of Sasanian Power in Fars. Fullerton, California: California State University. pp. 3–18.
- Hinds, Martin (1984). "The First Arab Conquests in Fārs". Iran: Journal of the British Institute of Persian Studies. 22 (1): 39–53. doi:10.1080/05786967.1984.11834297 (inactive 11 July 2025).
- Lambton, A. K. S. (1999). "FĀRS iii. History in the Islamic Period". Encyclopaedia Iranica, Vol. IX, Fasc. 4. pp. 337–341.
- Morony, Michael (1986). "ʿARAB ii. Arab conquest of Iran". Encyclopaedia Iranica, Vol. II, Fasc. 2. pp. 203–210.
- Pourshariati, Parvaneh (2008). Decline and Fall of the Sasanian Empire: The Sasanian-Parthian Confederacy and the Arab Conquest of Iran. London and New York: I.B. Tauris. ISBN 978-1-84511-645-3.
- Shakir, Mahmud (2005). Encyclopedia of Persian Gulf History: Part One. Al Manhal. ISBN 9796500011394.
- Zarrinkub, Abd al-Husain (1975). "The Arab conquest of Iran and its aftermath". The Cambridge History of Iran, Volume 4: From the Arab Invasion to the Saljuqs. Cambridge: Cambridge University Press. pp. 1–57. ISBN 978-0-521-20093-6.
