= Aban ibn Sa'id =

Aban ibn Sa'id أبان بن سعيد

Governor of Bahrayn
- Appointed by: Muhammad
- Preceded by: Al-Ala al-Hadhrami

Personal details
- Born: Mecca, Hejaz, Arabia
- Died: c. 632 CE
- Parents: Abu Uhayha Sa'id Ibn al-As (father); Hind bint al-Mughira (mother)
- Relatives: Ubayda, al-As, Khalid, Amr (brothers); Sa'id ibn al-As (nephew)
- Known for: Scribe of Muhammad who wrote revelation

Military service
- Allegiance: Quraysh; Rashidun Caliphate
- Battles/wars: Battle of Badr; Siege of Ta'if; Battle of Ajnadayn †

Aban ibn Sa'id ibn al-As (Arabic: أبان بن سعيد بن العاص, romanized: Abān ibn Saʿīd ibn al-ʿĀṣ), was one of the scribe of the Islamic prophet Muhammad, who was appointed as governor of Bahrayn in place of al-Ala al-Hadhrami.

== Biography ==
Aban's father's name is Abu Uhayha Sa'id ibn al-As and his mother's name is Hind bint al-Mughira. The fifth male in the upper part of his family went to Abd Manaf and met Muhammad's dynasty. His father Sa'id was a respected person of Quraysh. Sa'id had several sons. Among them, Khalid and Amr converted to Islam and migrated to Abyssinia in the early days of Islam. He died in Taif as a non-Muslim in the 2nd or 3rd year of Hijri and was buried there. Aban remained a pagan with his other two brothers, Ubayda and al-As. He was getting great pain when his two brothers converted to Islam. He expressed his pain in a poem written by him. One of his verses is as follows:

Alas! If the dead of Zariba had seen the lies that Amr and Khalid had lied about Din!

Aban, along with his two other brothers, continued to oppose Muhammad and the Muslims. He left Mecca with Ubayda and al-As to fight Muslims in the Battle of Badr. Ubayda and al-As were slain by Muslims. Aban somehow returned to Mecca with his life.

=== Before entering Islam ===
Ibn Hisham mentions an incident related to Aban's pre-Islam life: In the pre-Islamic era, Muhammad married some of his daughters to the Qurayshi youth of Mecca. When Muhammad's conflict with the Quraysh started, the Quraysh leaders appealed to Muhammad to divorce his daughters from the son-in-laws. Muhammad's daughter Ruqayya was the wife of Utbah ibn Abi Lahab. The Quraysh said to Utbah: You divorce Muhammad's daughter. He agreed on the condition that she would divorce Ruqayya if they could marry with him, the daughter of Aban ibn Sa'id, or the daughter of Sa'id ibn al-As. They accepted Utbah's demand and married Sa'id ibn al-As's daughter and overtook Ruqayya from him.

On the eve of the Treaty of al-Hudaybiya, Muhammad sent Uthman with his message to the Quraysh in Mecca. Then Uthman was heading towards Mecca with the 'Baldah' valley. The Quraysh asked him: Where to go? Uthman told them what Muhammad had told him. At that time, Aban ibn Sa'id came forward from among the Quraysh and welcomed Uthman. He had a close relationship with Uthman beforehand. Aban prepared his horse and lifted Uthman on his back and took charge of his safety. Then Aban brought Uthman to Mecca.

When Uthman came to Aban's house, Aban said to him: Why is this the condition of your clothes? Uthman's shirt was up to the middle of his knees aAban adds: Why don't you make your clothes as long as the people of Qaum? Uthman said: Our prophet wears a shirt like this. Aban says: You repent the Kaaba. Uthman said: We cannot do it until our Prophet does it. We just follow in his footsteps.

=== Coming towards Islam ===
Although Aban had long been hostile to the Prophet of Islam and Islam, he did not refrain from searching for the truth at this time. At that time, he used to ask wise people about Muhammad's prophecy. In those days, al-Sham or Syria was the center of wise and experienced people. Aban had a trip there for business. Once he spoke to a Christian by the name of 'Raheeb': 'I am the son of the Quraysh tribe of Hijaz. A man from this tribe claims to be the nominee of Allah. He said, God has sent me as a prophet like Jesus and Moses.' Raheeb asked the man's name. Aban said: The man's name is Muhammad. Rahib explained the age, lineage, etc. of the prophet's debut, as described in the Islamic holy books. Hearing his statement, Aban said: All of these exist in that man. Then Raheeb said: 'By Allah, then he will spread all over the world after he dominates the whole of Arabia. When you go back, you will convey my greetings to this righteous servant of Allah.' This Rahib or priest of Sham is called 'Yakka'. This time, when Aban returned from Sham, he had no previous form. The power of opposition to Islam and Muslims is gone.

Aban remained completely silent for a few days, thinking about the religion of his father and his peers and for his condemnation and ridicule. But he could not suppress the passion for truth that had arisen in him for a long time. Meanwhile, his brothers Amr and Khalid returned from Habas and contacted Aban. Then he converted to Islam before the Battle of Khaybar and migrated to Medina. The three brothers together participated in the Khaybar expedition with Muhammad.

According to another description, when Aban reached Medina, he made an emir of a small force of Muhammad and sent him to the Najd. When he returned to Medina after succeeding in this campaign, Khaybar's victory was over. At that time, Abu Hurayra came to Medina along with other muhajirs of Habas. The two of them approached Muhammad together. Muhammad gave them some parts of the goods of the People's Republic of Khaybar. Apart from the Najd campaign, he received the leadership of some other small expeditions from Muhammad.

Aban participated in the Siege of Ta'if with Muhammad. Abu Bakr saw the tomb of Aban's father in Taif and said: God's curse to the inhabitants of this tomb, he was opposed to Allah and the Messenger. Aban and his brother, Amr, immediately protested at Abu Bakr's words and condemned his father Abu Quhafa. Then Muhammad said: Don't abuse the dead. The living are hurt when they abuse the dead.

=== After death of Muhammad ===
Muhammad appointed Aban as a ruler of Bahrayn in place of Al-Ala al-Hadhrami. He performed this duty until Muhammad's death. Hearing the news of Muhammad's death, he returned to Medina.

After Muhammad's death, Abu Bakr was elected caliph. Aban is one of the few people who refrained from giving bay'ah for a few days. When the Banu Hashim gave Bay'ah, his objections were removed. Abu Bakr did not remove any ruler or employee appointed by Muhammad. Aban was also a ruler appointed by Muhammad. Abu Bakr requested Aban to return to his charge. But Aban refused the caliph's request. According to some descriptions, Aban finally took over as ruler of Yemen at repeated requests.

Ibn Sa'd explains: When Aban refused the caliph's request, one day Umar said to Aban: He should not have left the workplace without the permission of the imam or the leader. Now he refuses to go back there at his behest. Aban said: By Allah! I will not work for anyone else after the Messenger of Allah. If I had done so, I would have been Abu Bakr's 'hope' or employee because of his dignity, his advance in Islam, etc. Abu Bakr consulted the companions on who else could be sent to Bahrayn. Uthman said: Since Al-Ala al-Hadhrami was there before him, he should be sent there. Umar also said: Let Aban go there again. But Abu Bakr refused to do so. He said: Can I force anyone who says that I will not do any more work after the Messenger of Allah (peace and blessings of Allah be upon him). Then Al-Ala al-Hadhrami appointed as the ruler of Bahrayn.

=== Death ===
There are differences among sirat experts about the duration of Aban's death. According to Musa ibn ʿUqba and most genetic experts, he died at the end of Abu Bakr's caliphate in the battle of Ajnadayn on Hijri 13 (that's 634 CE). According to Ibn Ishaq, he died in the Battle of the Yarmuk and even according to some others on the day of Marj al-Saffar. Another description reveals that he died on 27 of Hijri during the caliphate of Uthman and under his supervision Zayd ibn Thabit compiled Uthman's manuscript. But there is ample reason to think that the first opinion is correct.
