= Khalid ibn Sa'id =

General and companion to Muhammad (died 634)

Khalid ibn Sa'id خالد بن سعيد
- Born: Unknown
- Died: 634 CE; Marj al-Saffar, Syria
- Spouse(s): Umayma bint Khalaf; Umm Hakim bint al-Harith
- Children: Sa'id; Ama
- Parent(s): Sa'id ibn al-As; Hind bint al-Mughira
- Relatives: Aban ibn Sa'id (brother); Amr ibn Sa'id (brother)
- Military career
- Allegiance: Muhammad; Rashidun Caliphate
- Conflicts: Muslim conquest of Syria; Expedition of Khalid ibn Sa'id †

Abū Saʿīd Khālid ibn Saʿīd ibn al-ʿĀṣ (أبو سعيد خالد بن سعيد بن العاص; d. 634 CE), was a Qurayshi companion of the Islamic prophet Muhammad, hailing from the Banu Umayya clan. Recognized in tradition as one of the earliest converts to Islam, Khalid served Muhammad as a scribe and administrative agent, managing affairs such as the collection of the zakat from the Madhhij tribe. Following Muhammad's death, he initially withheld his allegiance from Abu Bakr over political disagreements regarding the succession before later serving as a military commander during the early campaigns of the Rashidun Caliphate in Syria, where he was ultimately killed.

== Early life and conversion ==
Khalid was the son of Sa'id ibn al-'As (known as Abu Uhayha) of the Banu Umayya clan, and Hind bint al-Mughira of the Banu Makhzum clan. He migrated to Abyssinia with his wife, Umaymah bint Khalaf, also referred to by the names Amana or Humayma. During their time in Abyssinia, he acted as Umm Habiba's wali (guardian) during her marriage ceremony to Muhammad. He served as a scribe for Muhammad, primarily handling administrative matters. He eventually returned from Abyssinia alongside his brother, Amr, and Ja'far ibn Abi Talib. Following his return, Muhammad appointed him to collect the zakat (alms) from the Madhhij tribe.

== Opposition to Abu Bakr's succession ==
Upon returning to Medina from Yemen, Khalid delayed his pledge of allegiance to Abu Bakr for one month following the latter's succession. This refusal was based on his view that the rights to the Caliphate belonged to the Banu Abd Manaf, encompassing both the Hashim and Abd Shams clans. His brother, Aban ibn Sa'id, also refused to swear allegiance to Abu Bakr in solidarity with the Banu Hashim, only doing so once they had decided to pledge theirs.

== Military career and death ==
In 633, Khalid was appointed by Abu Bakr as a commander for the expedition into Syria. Khalid dispatched a messenger to inform the caliph of his movements, and Abu Bakr responded with an order for Khalid to advance while avoiding deep infiltration into Byzantine territory to prevent his army from being cut off. Khalid marched towards the border and arrived near Al Qastal, where he met the Byzantine army regrouped under the Armenian general Vahan. In the ensuing engagement, the Muslims gained the upper hand and defeated the Byzantines, though they sustained heavy casualties. Khalid subsequently requested reinforcements, and Abu Bakr dispatched elite warriors from Yemen led by prominent commanders such as Dhu al-Kala and Ikrima ibn Amr.

Once the supplementary Yemeni troops arrived, Khalid sought to exploit his earlier victory and advanced rapidly toward Damascus. When the Rashidun army approached, Vahan feigned a retreat toward Damascus to draw Khalid deeper into Syria. At Marj al-Saffar, Vahan's forces suddenly turned to counterattack while hidden troops emerged to surround the Muslim flanks. During the unexpected ambush, Khalid's son, Sa'id, was killed. Khalid fled the battlefield as his forces routed, but Ikrima rallied 6,000 warriors to execute an effective fighting retreat, preventing total annihilation. (Note: Some modern scholars cast doubt on the validity of Khalid ibn Sa'id's campaign as recorded by al-Tabari. William Muir and Fred M. Donner view the accounts of Khalid's defeat at Marj al-Saffar as potentially confused narratives of a later battle fought at the same site, though Donner notes Khalid likely still sustained a serious defeat leading to his withdrawal. Ilkka Syvänne accepts al-Tabari's composite reconstruction of events, noting that Khalid's initial success may have led to overconfidence. Blankinship raises the possibility that later accounts attributed to Khalid ibn al-Walid were designed to obscure the crushing defeat suffered by Khalid ibn Sa'id's army.)

Following the disaster at Marj al-Saffar, Khalid retreated with a small group of survivors to Wadi al-Qura. Abu Bakr subsequently permitted commander Shurahbil ibn Hasana to travel to al-Qura and absorb most of Khalid's surviving troops into his own retinue, effectively ending Khalid's independent command. On the evening preceding a later engagement, Khalid married Umm Hakim bint al-Harith ibn Hisham and was killed in the ensuing battle.

== Family and descendants ==
Khalid had two children born during his time in Abyssinia: Sa'id and Ama. His daughter, Ama bint Khalid, married Zubayr ibn al-Awwam, to whom she bore two sons, Amr and Khalid; she was referred to as Umm Khalid. His son, Sa'id ibn Khalid, served as a squadron commander during the later Battle of the Yarmuk. Sa'id and his men were killed by Roman troops while seeking to secure the frontier.

== Bibliography ==
- al-Balādhurī, Aḥmad ibn Yaḥyá (2002). The Origins of the Islamic State: Being a Translation from the Arabic Accompanied with Annotations, Geographic and Historic Notes of the Kitâb Futûḥ Al-buldân of Al-Imâm Abu-l ʻAbbâs Aḥmad Ibn-Jâbir Al-Balâdhuri. Gorgias Press. ISBN 978-1-931956-63-5. OCLC 2475649.
- Muir, Sir William (1883). Annals of the Early Caliphate: From Original Sources - Sir William Muir - Google Books.
- Martindale, J. R.; Jones, A. H. M. (1992). The Prosopography of the Later Roman Empire 2 Part Set: Volume 3, AD 527-641. Cambridge University Press. ISBN 978-0-521-20160-5.
- ibn Rāshid, Maʿmar; Abdel-Haleem, Muhammad M.A.S (2014). al-Ḥimyarī, ʻAbd al-Razzāq ibn Hammām; Anthony, Sean W. (eds.). The Expeditions: An Early Biography of Muḥammad. Translated by Anthony, Sean W.; Abdel Haleem, M. A. S. New York University Press. ISBN 978-0-8147-6963-8.
- Ibn Sa'd, Muhammad (1995). Kitāb al-Ṭabaqāt al-Kabīr: The Woman of Madina. Vol. 8. Translated by Aisha Bewley. London: Ta-Ha Publishers. ISBN 978-1-897940-24-2.
- Madelung, W. (1997). The Succession to Muḥammad: A Study of the Early Caliphate. Cambridge University Press. ISBN 978-0-521-64696-3.
- Morrow, John Andrew (2018). Islām and the People of the Book: Critical Studies on the Covenants of the Prophet, Volume 1. Cambridge Scholars Publishing. ISBN 978-1527509672.
- Ibn Ishaq, Muhammad (1955). The Life of Muhammad (Sīrat Rasūl Allāh). Translated by Alfred Guillaume. Oxford University Press.
- Ibn Hajar, Ahmad (1995). Al-Iṣābah fī Tamyīz al-Ṣaḥābah, Al-Juz’ al-Rabi‘ (in Arabic). Vol. 2. Beirut: Dār al-Kutub al-ʿIlmiyyah.
- Poonawala, Ismail, ed. (1990). The History of al-Ṭabarī, Volume IX: The Last Years of the Prophet: The Formation of the State, A.D. 630–632/A.H. 8–11. SUNY Series in Near Eastern Studies. Albany, New York: State University of New York Press. ISBN 978-0-88706-691-7.
- Blankinship, Khalid Yahya, ed. (1993). The History of al-Ṭabarī, Volume XI: The Challenge to the Empires. SUNY Series in Near Eastern Studies. Albany, New York: State University of New York Press. ISBN 978-0-7914-0851-3.
- Muir, William (1892). The Caliphate: Its Rise, Decline And Fall from Original Sources. The Religious Tract Society.
- Syvänne, Ilkka (2022). The Military History of Late Rome AD 602–641. Pen and Sword. ISBN 978-1-39907-567-1.
- Donner, Fred M. (2014). The Early Islamic Conquests. Princeton University Press.
