= Pars (Sasanian province) =

Province of the Sasanian Empire in Late Antiquity

Pars Pārs
- Province of the Sasanian Empire
- 224–651
- Map of Pars during the late Sasanian era
- Capital: Istakhr
- Historical era: Late Antiquity
  - Established: 224
  - Muslim conquest: 651
Preceded by	Succeeded by
Parthian Empire; Kings of Persis	Rashidun Caliphate
- Today part of: Iran

Pars (Middle Persian: 𐭯𐭠𐭫𐭮𐭩 Pārs) was a Sasanian province in Late Antiquity, which almost corresponded to the present-day province of Fars. It is the indigenous homeland of the Persian people or Pars/Farsiwan people. The province bordered Khuzestan in the west, Kirman in the east, Spahan in the north, and Mazun in the south.

== Name ==
The Middle Persian name of "Pārs" is derived from Pārsā (𐎱𐎠𐎼𐎿), the Old Persian of the region. The English name Persia and Greek name Persis derives from this region.

== Administrative divisions ==
=== Ardashir-Khwarrah ===
Ardashir-Khwarrah (Middle Persian: Arđaxšēr-Xwarra, meaning "glory of Ardashir") was founded by the first Sasanian king Ardashir I (r. 224–242), who made Gor (also founded around the same time) its capital. It was the seat of the driyōšān jādag-gōw ud dādwar (advocate), mowbed (chief priest) and andarzbad (councilor) of Pars.

It formed the southwestern administrative division of Pars, and consisted of a mountainous countryside of the southern Zagros Mountains—much of the territory inhabited later by the Qashqai tribe; with its mountainous terrain and extreme temperature, this was regarded by the geographers as a "sardsīr" (cold zone). The Zagros mountains and the coastal plain, along the Persian Gulf, however, was regarded by the geographers as a garmsīr (hot zone). In the center of the circular city of Gor, there was a tower-like structure called Terbal, which was similar to a Buddhist stupa. Furthermore, there was also a fire-temple which the 10th-century Arab historian al-Masudi reportedly visited.

=== Istakhr ===
Istakhr (Middle Persian: Staxr) served as an administrative and religious centre under the Sasanian Empire, which it had done since Achaemenid times. The Anahid fire-temple was the "ideological heart of the empire." It was also the home town of the Sasanians.

=== Darabgerd ===
Darabgerd (Middle Persian: Dārāvkirt, meaning "Darab did it") was a town founded during the Parthian era, and was turned into an administrative division by Ardashir I after he took conquered it.

=== Shapur-Khwarrah ===
Shapur-Khwarrah (Middle Persian: Šāpuhr-Xwarra, meaning "glory of Shapur") was founded by the second Sasanian king Shapur I (r. 240–270).

=== Arrajan (Veh-az-Amid-Kavadh) ===
Arrajan (Middle Persian: Argān), also known as Veh-az-Amid-Kavadh, was a late administrative division founded in the early 6th century by Kavadh I (r. 498–531), who attached a small part of Khuzestan to it and settled prisoners of war from Amid and Martyropolis in the place.

== History ==
=== Establishment ===
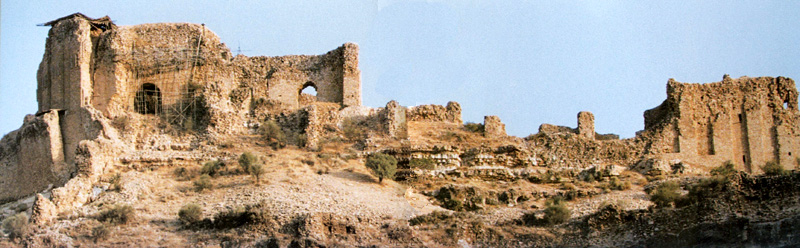
Ghal'eh Dokhtar (or "The Maiden's Castle") a castle built by Ardashir I in Gor

Ardashir I's conquest of Pars started from the early 200s and ended in ca. 223; the province was originally divided between several local rulers, who were vassals of the Parthian Empire. Ardashir's conquest began when he succeeded Tiri as the argbed (fortress commander) of the castle of Darabgerd. From there he marched to the nearby place of Gobanan, where he killed its king, Pasin. He thereafter marched to a place named Konus and killed its king, Manuchihr. He then invaded Lurwir and killed its king, Dara. In ca. 205/6, Ardashir urged his father Papak to revolt and kill Gochihr, the powerful ruler of Istakhr; Papak successfully managed to do that, but appointed his other son Shapur as his heir, which enraged Ardashir and made him fortify himself in another place in Pars, where he later founded Gor.

Papak died a few years later, which gave Ardashir the opportunity to rebel against Shapur, who died in 211/2 after an accident. Ardashir spent the rest of the following years fighting other local rulers of Pars and its surroundings, such as the Parthian dynast Mihrak, who ruled Abarsas and Jahrom. By 223, Ardashir was the undisputed king of Pars, and the following year defeated and killed the last Parthian king, Artabanus V.

=== Early history ===
During the childhood of Shapur II (r. 309–379), Arab nomads made several incursions into Pars, where they raided Gor and its surroundings.

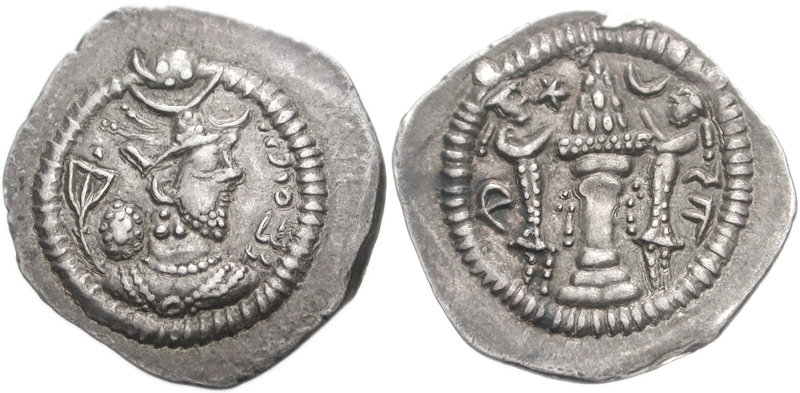
Coin of Peroz I minted in Pars

=== Late history ===
In the early 5th century, a bridge was built in Gor by the Sasanian minister (wuzurg framadār) Mihr Narseh, who was a native of Abruwan, a subdistrict in Ardashir-Khwarrah. An inscription was also written on the bridge, which says; "This bridge was built by order of Mihr-Narseh, wuzurg framadār, for his soul's sake and at his own expense... Whoever has come on this road let him give a blessing to Mihr-Narseh and his sons for that he thus bridged this crossing." Furthermore, he also founded four villages with a fire-temple in each of them. The name of the fire-temples were; Faraz-mara-awar-khwadaya, Zurwandadan, Kardadan, and Mahgushnaspan. He had a fifth fire-temple constructed in Abruwan, which may have been the Barin fire-temple that the 10th-century Persian geographer Estakhri visited, who stated that the fire-temple had an inscription that stated 30,000 dirhams was spent for its construction. Sometime before 540, a diocese was established in Gor.

=== Muslim conquest ===
==== First Muslim invasion and the successful Sasanian counter-attack ====
The Muslim invasion of Pars first began in 638/9, when the Rashidun governor of Bahrain, al-'Ala' ibn al-Hadrami, who after having defeated some rebellious Arab tribes, seized an island in the Persian Gulf. Although al-'Ala' and the rest of the Arabs had been ordered to not invade Pars or its surrounding islands, he and his men continued their raids into the province. Al-'Ala quickly prepared an army which was divided into three groups, one under al-Jarud ibn Mu'alla, the second under al-Sawwar ibn Hammam and the third under Khulayd ibn al-Mundhir ibn Sawa. When the first group entered Pars, it was quickly defeated and al-Jarud was killed.

The same thing soon happened to the second group. However, things proved to be more fortunate with the third group; Khulayd managed to keep them on bay, but was unable to withdraw back to Bahrain due to the Sasanians blocking his way at the sea. Umar, founding out about al-'Ala's invasion of Pars, had him replaced with Sa'd ibn Abi Waqqas as the governor of Bahrain. Umar then ordered Utbah ibn Ghazwan to send reinforcements to Khulayd. When the reinforcements arrived, Khulayd and some of his men managed successfully to withdraw back to Bahrain, while the rest withdrew to Basra.

==== Second and last Muslim invasion ====
In ca. 643, Uthman ibn Abi al-As seized Bishapur, and made a peace treaty with the inhabitants of the city. In 19/644, al-'Ala' once again attacked Pars from Bahrain, reaching as far as Istakhr, until he was repelled by the governor (marzban) of Pars, Shahrag. Some time later, Uthman ibn Abi al-As managed to establish a military base at Tawwaj, and shortly defeated and killed Shahrag near Rew-shahr (however other sources states that it was his brother who did it). A Persian convert to Islam, Hormoz ibn Hayyan al-'Abdi, was shortly sent by Uthman ibn Abi al-'As to attack a fortress known as Senez on the coast of Pars. After the accession of Uthman ibn Affan as the new Caliph of the Rashidun Caliphate on 11 November, the inhabitants of Bishapur under the leadership of Shahrag's brother declared independence, but were defeated. However the date for this revolt mains disputed, as the Persian historian al-Baladhuri states that it occurred in 646.

In 648, 'Abd-Allah ibn al-'Ash'ari forced the governor of Istakhr, Mahak, to surrender the city. However, this was not the final conquest of Istakhr, as the inhabitants of the city would later rebel in 649/50 while its newly appointed governor, 'Abd-Allah ibn 'Amir was trying to capture Gor. The military governor of the province, 'Ubayd Allah ibn Ma'mar, was defeated and killed. In 650/1, the Sasanian emperor Yazdegerd III went to Istakhr and tried to plan an organized resistance against the Arabs, and after some time he went to Gor, but Istakhr failed to put up a strong resistance, and was soon sacked by the Arabs, who killed over 40,000 defenders. The Arabs then quickly seized Gor, Kazerun and Siraf, while Yazdegerd III fled to Kirman. Thus ended the Muslim conquest of Pars, however, the inhabitants of the province would later several times rebel against the Arabs.

== Religion ==
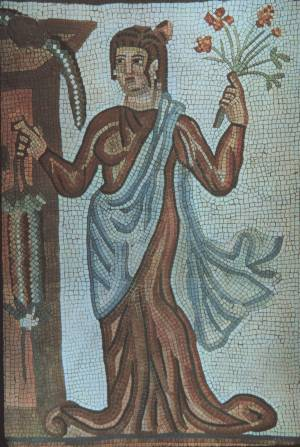
Irano-Roman floor mosaic detail from the palace of Shapur I at Bishapur.

The majority of Pars' inhabitants were Zoroastrians, which is confirmed by the linguistic and historical evidence found in the region, such as the burial practices found in the region and "that the Avesta was canonized on the basis of the tradition of Pars." A large Christian community also lived in Pars, due to the large deportation of inhabitants from the Roman Empire by Shapur I to the province.

== See also ==
- Fars (East Syriac ecclesiastical province)

== Sources ==
- Axworthy, Michael (2008). A History of Iran: Empire of the Mind. New York: Basic Books. pp. 1–368. ISBN 978-0-465-00888-9.
- Bosworth, C. E. (1986). "ARDAŠĪR-ḴORRA". Encyclopaedia Iranica, Vol. II, Fasc. 4. pp. 384–385.
- Daryaee, Touraj (2012). "MEHR-NARSEH". Encyclopaedia Iranica.
- Huff, Dietrich (1999). "FĪRŪZĀBĀD". Encyclopaedia Iranica, Vol. IX, Fasc. 6. pp. 633–636.
- Miri, Negin (2009). "Historical Geography of Fars during the Sasanian Period" (PDF). Sasanika. University of Sydney. pp. 1–65. Archived from the original (PDF) on 2016-04-04.
- Morony, M. (1986). "ʿARAB ii. Arab conquest of Iran". Encyclopaedia Iranica, Vol. II, Fasc. 2. pp. 203–210.
- Perikhanian, A. (1983). "Iranian Society and Law". The Cambridge History of Iran: The Seleucid, Parthian, and Sasanian periods (2). Cambridge: Cambridge University Press. pp. 627–681. ISBN 978-0-521-24693-4.
- Pourshariati, Parvaneh (2008). Decline and Fall of the Sasanian Empire: The Sasanian-Parthian Confederacy and the Arab Conquest of Iran. London and New York: I.B. Tauris. ISBN 978-1-84511-645-3.
- Zarrinkub, Abd al-Husain (1975). "The Arab conquest of Iran and its aftermath". The Cambridge History of Iran, Volume 4: From the Arab Invasion to the Saljuqs. Cambridge: Cambridge University Press. pp. 1–57. ISBN 978-0-521-20093-6.
- A. K. S., Lambton (1999). "FĀRS iii. History in the Islamic Period". Encyclopaedia Iranica, Vol. IX, Fasc. 4. pp. 337–341.
- Daryaee, Touraj (1986). Collapse of Sasanian Power in Fars. Fullerton, California: California State University. pp. 3–18.
- Bivar, A. D. H.; Boyce, Mary (1998). "EṢṬAḴR". Encyclopaedia Iranica, Vol. VIII, Fasc. 6. pp. 643–646.
- Fisher, William Bayne; Yarshater, Ehsan (1983). The Cambridge History of Iran: The Seleucid, Parthian and Sasanian periods. Cambridge University Press. ISBN 978-0-521-24693-4.
- Daryaee, Touraj (2014). Sasanian Persia: The Rise and Fall of an Empire. I.B.Tauris. pp. 1–240. ISBN 978-0857716668.
- Shapur Shahbazi, A. (2005). "SASANIAN DYNASTY". Encyclopaedia Iranica, Online Edition.
- Tafazzoli, Ahmad (1989). "BOZORGĀN". Encyclopaedia Iranica, Vol. IV, Fasc. 4. Ahmad Tafazzoli. p. 427.
- Daryaee, Touraj (2009). "SHAPUR II". Encyclopaedia Iranica.
- Shahbazi, A. Shapur (2004). "HORMOZD (2)". Encyclopaedia Iranica, Vol. XII, Fasc. 5. pp. 461–462.
- Tafazzoli, Ahmad (1983). "ĀDUR NARSEH". Encyclopaedia Iranica, Vol. I, Fasc. 5. p. 477.
- Potts, Daniel T. (2012). "ARABIA ii. The Sasanians and Arabia". Encyclopaedia Iranica.
- Al-Tabari, Abu Ja'far Muhammad ibn Jarir (1991). Yar-Shater, Ehsan (ed.). The History of al-Ṭabarī, Volume V: The Sasanids, the Byzantines, the Lakhmids, and Yemen. Trans. Clifford Edmund Bosworth. Albany, NY: State University of New York Press. ISBN 0-7914-0493-5.
- Wiesehöfer, Josef (2001). Ancient Persia. Translated by Azodi, Azizeh. I.B. Tauris. ISBN 978-1-86064-675-1.
