= Istakhr Revolts (648-651) =

650s battle

Revolts of Istakhr
- Part of Arab conquest of Fars
Date	648-651
Location	Istakhr (8 km northeast of Persepolis)
Result	Rashidun victory

Belligerents
Rashidun Caliphate	Sasanian Empire

Commanders and leaders
Uthman ibn Affan; Abd-Allah ibn Amir	Yazdegerd III

Strength
Unknown	Unknown

Casualties and losses
Unknown	40,000–100,000 killed

The Istakhr revolts were fought between the Sasanians and the Rashidun Caliphate in 648-651. The Sasanian emperor Yazdegerd III made it to Istakhr, which is approximately 8 km northeast of Persepolis, the new capital of the Sasanian Empire and tried to plan an organized resistance against the Arabs.

After some time he went to Gor, but Istakhr failed to put up a strong resistance, and was soon sacked by the Arabs, who killed 40,000 to 100,000 defenders . The Arabs then quickly seized Gor, Kazerun and Siraf, while Yazdegerd III fled to Kerman and the Muslim conquest of Fars came to an end; however, the series of revolts still haunted the town until it was pacified for once by AD 693 and the status as provincial capital was moved to Shiraz.
