= Battle of Marj al-Saffar =

Battle of Marj al-Saffar may refer to:

- Battle of Marj al-Saffar (635) - A battle between Rashidun army and Byzantine army during the Muslim conquest of Syria.
- Battle of Marj al-Saffar (1126) - The last major clash in the Seljuk–Crusader War between the Latin Kingdom of Jerusalem and the Seljuk Emirate of Damascus
- Battle of Marj al-Saffar (1129) - Only major battle of the Crusade of 1129
- Battle of Marj al-Saffar (1303) - The last major battle in the Mamluk-Ilkhanid War
- Battle of Marj al-Saffar (1390) - A battle between Barquq and Timurbugha Mintash. Before the battle Al-Salih Hajji, the last sultan of the Bahri dynasty, fell captive to Barquq

== See also ==
- Battle of Marj Rahit (disambiguation) - a plain to the north of Marj al-Saffar in which a series of battles were fought
