= Shahrag =

Shahrag (Persian: شهرگ; also spelled Shahrak) was an Iranian aristocrat, who served as the governor of Pars during the Arab invasion of Iran.

He is first mentioned in 644, when he defeated the Arab military leader al-Ala'a Al-Hadrami near Estakhr. Some time later, Uthman ibn Abi al-As established a military base at Tawwaj, and shortly after defeated and killed Shahrag near Rew-shahr (however other sources states that it was Shahrak's brother who killed him).

== Sources ==
- Pourshariati, Parvaneh (2008). Decline and Fall of the Sasanian Empire: The Sasanian-Parthian Confederacy and the Arab Conquest of Iran. London and New York: I.B. Tauris. ISBN 978-1-84511-645-3.
- Zarrinkub, Abd al-Husain (1975). "The Arab conquest of Iran and its aftermath". The Cambridge History of Iran, Volume 4: From the Arab Invasion to the Saljuqs. Cambridge: Cambridge University Press. pp. 1–57. ISBN 978-0-521-20093-6.
- Morony, M. (1986). "ʿARAB ii. Arab conquest of Iran". Encyclopaedia Iranica, Vol. II, Fasc. 2. pp. 203–210.
- A. K. S., Lambton (1999). "FĀRS iii. History in the Islamic Period". Encyclopaedia Iranica, Vol. IX, Fasc. 4. pp. 337–341.
- Daryaee, Touraj. Collapse of Sasanian Power in Fars. Fullerton, California: California State University. pp. 3–18.
