= Battle of Marj Rahit =

The Battle of Marj Rahit can refer to one of several battles fought at the plain of Marj Rahit, near Damascus:

- Battle of Marj Rahit (634), between the Muslim Arabs under Khalid b. Walid and the Christian Ghassanid Arabs
- Battle of Marj Rahit (684), between the Umayyads under Marwan I and the partisans of Ibn al-Zubayr, under al-Dahhak b. Qays al-Fihri
- Battle of Marj Rahit (947), between the Hamdanids under Sayf al-Dawla and the Ikhshidids

== See also ==
- Battle of Marj al-Saffar (disambiguation) - a plain to the south of Marj Rahit in which a series of battles were fought
