= Mahmud Shakir =

Syrian writer and historian

- Born: Ramadan 1351 AH / 1932 AC; Harasta, Syria
- Died: November 23, 2014 (aged 81–82)
- Education: University of Damascus

Mahmud Shakir, (Arabic:محمود شاكر) also known as Al-Sheikh Abu-Osama Mahmud Bin Shakir Shakir Al-Harastani, was a historian and an Islamic writer from Syria. He was born in Harasta, northeast of Damascus, in the month of Ramadan, 1932. He died in Al-Riyadh, on November 23, 2014.

== Education and career ==
Mahmud Shakir studied elementary, secondary, and high school, and graduated in 1371 AH / 1952 AC. He received Sharia sciences education at the hands of some scholars in the mosques of his hometown. Later on, he joined the University of Damascus to study geography, and he graduated in 1956-1957 AC.

He was passionate about studying the sciences of history. He was outstanding when it came to the Islamic history, and he classified it in an innovative way. He excelled for his ability to word history from the Islamic point of view in all its details, from the past to present, in addition to presenting the events and their analysis. In his writing he had responded to some of the suspicions raised by the orientalists and their followers. He was interested in studying genealogy, and he excelled in it.

He moved to the Kingdom of Saudi Arabia in 1972, and worked as a professor of geography and Islamic history at the College of Social Sciences in Riyadh and Al-Qassim. He launched a radio program for the Quran Radio from Saudi Arabia called Geography of the Islamic World. He has more than two hundred works on history, Islamic ideology and geography. He also participated in developing curricula and study plans in the sciences of history and geography.

He died on November 23, 2014.

== Works ==
=== History Books ===
- "The Book of Islamic History Encyclopedia" (22 parts) – (original title: Mawsuat Ketab Al-Tarekh Al-Islami).
- "The Islamic World - Series" (original title: Selselat Al-Alam Al-Islami)
- "Builders of The Islamic State Series, In The biography of The Companions" (original title: Selselat Bunat Dawlat Al-Islam, Fe Seyar Al-Sahabah Radia Allah Anhum)
- "The Companions Series;" (original title: Selselat Al-Khulafa')
1. The caliphs of the Rashidun era series. (original title: Selselat Khulafa' Al-Ahd Al-Rashidi)
2. The caliphs of the Omayyad era series. (original title: Selselat khulafa' Al-Ahd Al-Amawi)
3. The caliphs of the Abbasid era series. (original title: Selselat Khulafa' Al- Ahd Al-Abasi)
4. The Caliphs in the era of Buyid control. (original title: Al-Khulafa' Fe Asr Al-Saytara Al-Buwayhiyah)
5. Caliphs in the era of Seljuk control. (original title: Al-Khulafa' Fe Asr Al-Saytara Al-Suljukiyah)

=== Books on geography ===
- "The Citizen of the Islamic countries in Asia series." (original title: Selselat Muwatin Al-Shuob Al-Islamia Fe Asya)
- "The Citizen of the Islamic countries in Africa series." (original title: Selselat Muwatin Al-Shuob Al-Islamia Fe Afrikya)
- "Geographical disclosures, their motives - their truths." (original title: Al-Kushof Al-Joghrafiya, Dwafiha - Hakekatha)
- "Geography of environments." (original title: Joghrafiyat Al-Bea'at)

=== Books on Islamic history and ideologies. ===
- "The basic premise in Islamic history." (original title: Al-Muntalak Al-Asasi Fe Al-Tarekh Al-Islami)
- "With Allah's prophets and messengers." (original title: Ma' Anbiya' Allah Wa Roseleh)
- "Muslims under communist control." (original title: Al-Muslimun Taht Al-Saytara Al-Shyoueyah)
- "Muslims under capitalist control." (original title: Al-Muslimun Taht Al-Saytara Al-Ra'smaliyah)
- "A short trip with our history." (original title: Rehlah Qasira Ma' Tarekhena)
- "Historical culture." (original title: Al-Thaqafah Al-Tarekheya)
- "Guidance and calendar during Islamic history." (original title: Al-Tawjeeh Wa Al-Taqweem Khelal Al-Tarekh Al-Islami)
- "The identity of the Muslim Ummah." (original title: Haweyat Al-Ummah Al-Muslima)
- "Thorns on the trail." (original title: Ashwak Ala Al_Darb)
- "Topics about the caliphate and the emirate." (original title: Mawduo'at Hawl Al-Khelafa Wa Al-Emara)
- "Our slow growth and the way forward." (original title: Mawq'na Al-Muta'khera Wa Sabeel Al-Takadom)
- "Muslims and public issues." (original title: Al-Muslimun Wa Al-Qadaya Al-Ama)
- "Fading civilization." (original title: Al-Hadarah Al-Mutahaweya)
- "Morals deviation." (original title: Al-Junoh Bel-Akhlaq)
- "Knowledge deviation or breaking wolves."(otiginal title: Al-Junoh Bel-Elm Aw Al-The'ab Al-Kasera)
- "And the mask was revealed." (original title: Wa Inkashafa Al Qina'a)
- "The way’s insight." (original title: Tabserat AL-Tareeq)
- "Fallacies and their impact on the nation." (original title: Al-Mughlatat Wa Atharuha Fe Al_Ummah)
- "Backwardness." (original title: Al-Takhaluf)
- "Contemporary Women." (original title: Al-Mara' Al-Mua'aserah)
- "Primitive groups." (original title: Al-Jamat Al_bedaiyah)
- "To the preachers." (original title: Ela Al-Duo'ah)
- "The seekers in life." (original title: Al-Su'ah Fe Al-Hayah)
- "Messages to the youth." (original title: Rasael Ela Al-Shabab)
- "Migration to Abyssinia." (original title: Ma' Al-Hijra Ela Al-Habashah)
- "The homeless." (original title: Al-Musharadoun)
- "Yarmouk battle field." (original title: Medan Ma'rakat Al-Yarmouk)
- "The plight of Muslims in Chechnya." (original title: Mehnat Al-Muslemeen Fe Al-Sheeshan)

=== New releases ===
- "Pages from history." (original title: Safhat Men Al-Tarekh)
- "Biography of the Prophet Sallallahu 'Alaihi Wa Salam." (original title: Al-Seera Al-Nabawiyah Sallallahu 'Alaihi Wa Salam)
- "The last of the prophets and messengers." (original title: Khatam Al-Anbiya' Wa Al-Mursaleen)
- "The cunningness of the enemies and the children’s negligence." (original title: Kayd Al-Ada'a Wa Ghaflat Al-Abna'a)
- "Historical monuments - lessons and examples." (original title: Al-Malem Al-Tarekheyah, Durous Wa Ebar)
- "The middle nation." (original title: Al-Ummah Al-Wasat)
- "The ones promised with the everlasting paradise." (original title: Al-Mubashroon Wa Al-Mubasharat Be Janat Al-Khold)
- "Persians and Romans and their suspicious role throughout history." (original title: Al-Furs Wa Al-Room Wa Dawrohom Al-Mashbooh Abr Al-Tareekh)
