= Wadi al Baldah =

- Valley
- Location within Saudi Arabia
- Coordinates: 24°19′12″N 38°26′12″E
- Country: Saudi Arabia

Wadi al Baldah (Arabic: وادي البلدة, romanized: Wādī al Baldah), is a wadi located in the state of Madina, Saudi Arabia. This valley mentioned in early Islamic sources.
