= Mihrak =

Early 3rd-century Parthian dynast

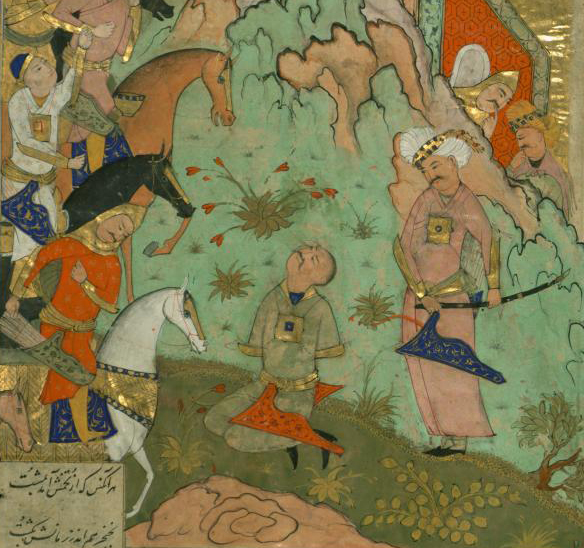
Shahnameh illustration of Ardashir I about to execute Mihrak.

Mihrak was a Parthian dynast, who was the ruler of Abarsas and Jahrom in the early 3rd century. He was the son of Anoshagzatan, and belonged to a family which traced their descent back to the Kayanids. He was defeated and killed in ca. 222 during a clash with the first Sasanian king Ardashir I (r. 224-242). Mihrak had a daughter named Gurdzad (probably Khwarranzem), who later married Ardashir's son Shapur and bore him Hormizd.

== Sources ==
- Al-Tabari, Abu Ja'far Muhammad ibn Jarir (1985–2007). Ehsan Yar-Shater (ed.). The History of Al-Ṭabarī. Vol. 40 vols. Albany, NY: State University of New York Press.
- Miri, Negin (2009). "Historical Geography of Fars during the Sasanian Period" (PDF). Sasanika. University of Sydney. pp. 1–65. Archived from the original (PDF) on 2016-04-04.
- Ja'fari, Shiva (2008). "JAHROM". Encyclopaedia Iranica, Vol. XIV, Fasc. 4. pp. 392–395.
- Pourshariati, Parvaneh (2008). Decline and Fall of the Sasanian Empire: The Sasanian-Parthian Confederacy and the Arab Conquest of Iran. London and New York: I.B. Tauris. ISBN 978-1-84511-645-3.
