= Abarsas =

Historical area in present-day Iran

Map of the Sasanian province of Pars.

Abarsas was an ancient district in present-day southern Iran. It is first mentioned in the early 3rd-century as part of the fief of the Parthian dynast Mihrak. In 222, his fief was conquered by the Sasanian king Ardashir I (r. 224–242), who two years later had it incorporated into the administrative division of Ardashir-Khwarrah.

== Sources ==
- Al-Tabari, Abu Ja'far Muhammad ibn Jarir (1985–2007). Ehsan Yar-Shater (ed.). The History of Al-Ṭabarī. Vol. 40 vols. Albany, NY: State University of New York Press.
- Miri, Negin (2009). "Historical Geography of Fars during the Sasanian Period" (PDF). Sasanika. University of Sydney. pp. 1–65. Archived from the original (PDF) on 2016-04-04.
- Pourshariati, Parvaneh (2008). Decline and Fall of the Sasanian Empire: The Sasanian-Parthian Confederacy and the Arab Conquest of Iran. London and New York: I.B. Tauris. ISBN 978-1-84511-645-3.
