= Solluba =

Solluba صُلبة
Languages
- Arabic

Religion
- Islam

The Solluba, also known as the Sleb, Solubba and the Sulayb (Arabic: صُلبة, صليب), were a Hutaym tribal group in the northern part of the Arabian Peninsula who were clearly distinguishable from the Arabs. Due to social stigma, very few people openly identify as Ṣulayb today.

== Origin ==
The Solluba have been identified with the Selappayu in Akkadian records, and a clue to their origin is their use of desert kites and game traps, first appearing in archaeological records around 7000 BC. Cambridge linguist and anthropologist Roger Blench sees the Solluba as the last survivors of Palaeolithic hunters and salt-traders who once dominated Arabia. Those were assimilated in the next wave of humans consisted of cattle herders in the 6th millennium BC who introduced cows, wild donkeys, sheep and dogs, wild camels and goats. Those peoples may have engaged in trade across the Red Sea with speakers of Cushitic languages or Nilo-Saharan languages. In the 3rd and 2nd millennium BC speakers of Semitic languages arrived from the Near East and marginalised and absorbed the rest.

Western travellers reported that the Bedouin did not consider the Solluba to be descendants of Qaḥṭān. One legend mentions that they originated from ancient Christian groups, possibly Crusaders (known as Salibiyin in Arabic) who were taken into slavery by the Bedouin. Werner Caskel criticizes the Crusader origin theory and instead proposes that the term "Solluba" describes a host of groups hailing from different backgrounds: those of al-Ḥasā being of 12th- to 13th-century AD migrants from southern Persia, and the group to the west being composed of communities emerging after their defeat by the Wahhabis. Another theory sees the Solluba as a former Bedouin group that lost their herds and fell in the eyes of other Bedouin.

== Society ==
The Solluba were reported by Western travellers as having different physical features than other Arabs, often with fairer eyes and hair. They also spoke a distinct variety of Arabic that contained several words exclusive to their dialect. The Bedouin usually differentiated between the Solluba and other Hutaymi groups, since unlike Hutaymis the Solluba were independent and did not require protection from the Bedouin. The Arab Bedouin despised the Solluba and counted them as men of no honor and thus inferior to them. Their deep knowledge of the desert however earned them the title Abu al-Khala (Fathers of the empty spaces).

The Solluba followed occupations such as carpentry, and metal- and leather-working. They were also known as fortune-tellers and magicians, as well as musicians and poets. The Bedouin valued their knowledge of the desert, often hiring them as scouts, and depended on them to heal their animals. Despite their dependence on the Solluba, the Bedouin did not appreciate them and often looked down upon them. Unlike other nomadic Hutaymi and Bedouin groups, the Solluba did not engage in plundering and were in turn viewed as neutrals and often spared when raids took place. Despite their low status, their hospitality was accepted, especially when a warrior was sick or wounded as they were famed as healers.

During spring the Solluba lived close to Bedouin settlements and lived off the milk of their cattle. In summer they trekked deep in the desert accompanied only by their wild asses and lived on hunting. The Solluba owned certain slopes and valleys in the desert and young men gave portions of their territory as dowry to the family of brides to hunt on.

Although formally Muslims, few Solluba were observant. They seem to have retained some of their traditional beliefs, worshipping the boulder al-Weli Abu Ruzuma, located in the Syrian Desert. Their emblem, which was shown at ceremonial festivities, was a cross wrapped with a dress. Generally, they were seen as Kafir (non-Muslims) and suffered Wahhabi raids, with a notorious massacre in the ʿArʿar valley.

== Population ==
Clear estimates of Solluba numbers are difficult as a result of their spread over a large geographical area. In 1898 their total number was put at 3,000. Some 1,700 were thought to be spread in the Syrian Desert. Ottoman records show around 500 Sollubas in the region of Mosul. Their numbers continued to dwindle in the 20th century, and many were massacred by Wahhabis during the Ikhwan rebellion, they were however compensated by Ibn Saud. After the Second World War many Solluba were employed in the Iraqi, Jordanian and Kuwaiti armies as reputable trackers. Solluba and other nomads were settled in new urban centres along pipelines after the discovery of oil, many became identified with the Arab tribes where they settled while others continued to be known as Ṣulayb.

== Notes ==
=== References ===
- Dostal, Walter (1956), "Die Ṣolubba und ihre Bedeutung für die Kulturgeschichte Arabiens. Monographische Zusammenfassung der Ergebnisse meines Studienaufenthaltes in Kuwēt", Archiv für Völkerkunde vol. 11, pp. 15–42
- McNutt, Paula (2003). 'Imagining' Biblical Worlds: Studies in Spatial, Social and Historical Constructs in Honour of James W. Flanagan. Continuum International Publishing Group. ISBN 978-0-8264-6149-0.
- Meeker, Michael E. (1979). Literature and Violence in North Arabia. CUP Archive. ISBN 978-0-521-22074-3.
- Doughty, C. M.; Lawrence, T. E. (2010). Travels in Arabia Desert. Cosimo, Inc. ISBN 978-1-61640-516-8.
- Blench, Roger (2010), The Semiticisation of the Arabian Peninsula and the problem of its reflection in the archaeological record (PDF)
- Bosworth, C. E .; Heinrichs, A.; Donzel, E. J. (23 February 1998), W. & F. Lancaster (ed.), Encyclopaedia of Islam, Volume 9 - Volume IX (San-Sze), 9, Brill Academic Publishers, pp. 814–815, ISBN 978-90-04-10422-8
- Levinson, David (1995). Encyclopedia of World Cultures: Africa and the Middle East. G.K. Hall. ISBN 978-0-8161-1815-1.
