= Al Qastal, Jordan =

Al Qastal
- Location in Jordan
- Coordinates: 31°44′49″N 35°56′8″E
- Country: Jordan
- Governorate: Amman Governorate
- Time zone: UTC + 2

Al Qastal (Arabic: القسطل) is a town in the Amman Governorate of northern Jordan. Originally established as an Umayyad settlement, it remains the oldest and most complete such settlement in the Near East. The remains of the minaret at Qastal is especially important as it is the only one extant from the Umayyad period, making it one of the oldest minarets in the world. Qasr al-Qastal, also located within the town, is considered one of the desert castles and is just 5 km from Qasr Mshatta.

== History ==
Textual evidence from the poet Kuthayyir 'Azzah indicates that the Qasr al-Qastal complex was originally built by Caliph Yazid bin Abd al-Malik. The fact that the Qasr al-Qastal complex was finished, while the nearby Qasr Mshatta was never finished, indicates that Qasr al-Qastal may be the oldest Umayyad construction in the area. Tombstones from Al-Qastal indicate that after the fall of the Umayyads the site was used by the Abbasid Caliphate. When the Abbasid Caliphate fell, there was a short period when the site was abandoned. Later, under the Ayyubid and Mamluk dynasties, Al-Qastal was re-settled, a number of small buildings dating back to this time.

== Qasr al-Qastal ==
=== Palace ===
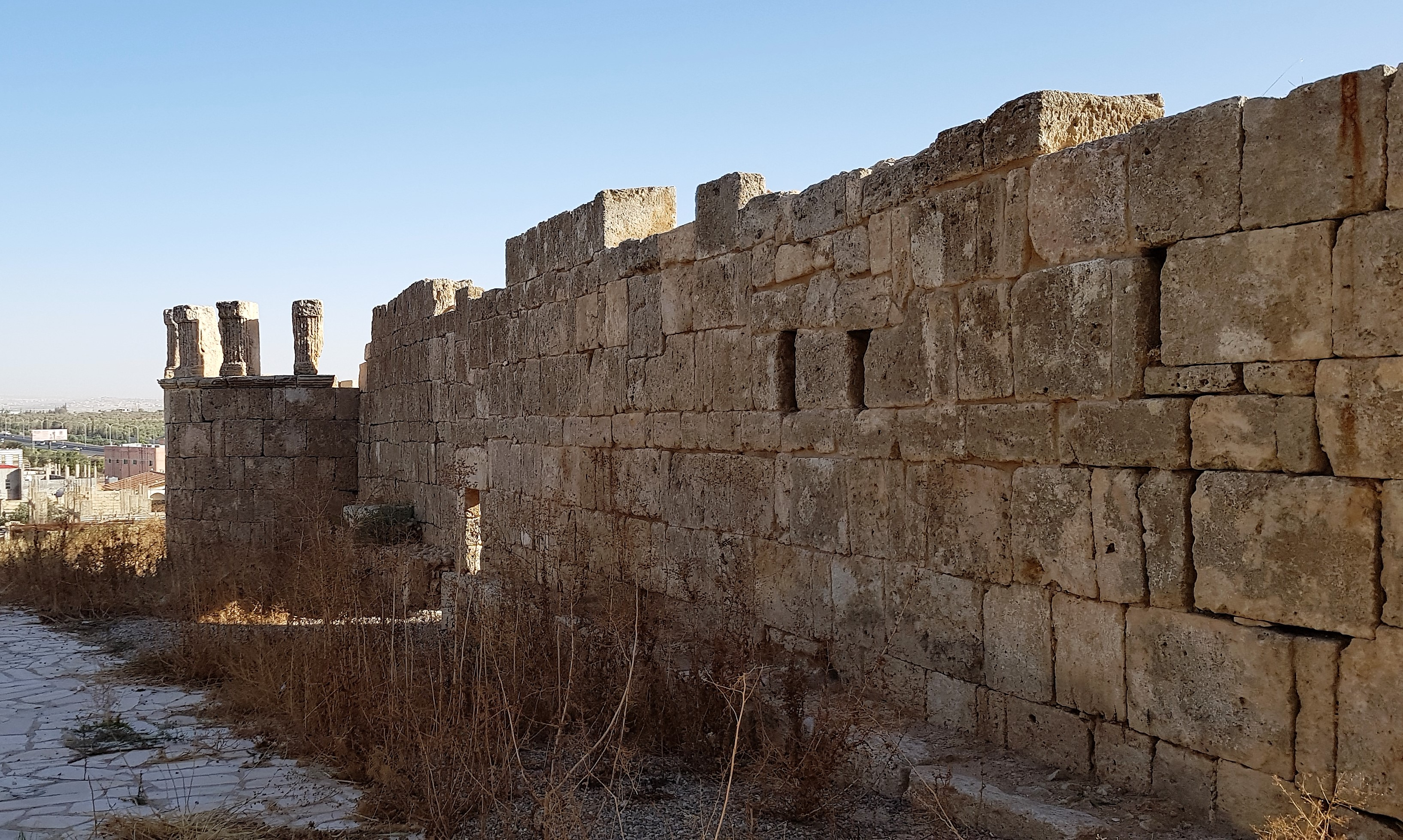
Side wall of the mosque and the base of the minaret at Qasr al-Qastal.

Qasr al-Qastal was an Umayyad palace of the qasr type. The building was approximately 68 meters square. The outer wall of the palace had 12 semi-circular towers at intervals between four large corner towers. The ground floor comprised an entrance hall, courtyard, and six suites of rooms. The upper story contained another set of suites and the palace's audience hall which had a triple, apse design. The palace was originally decorated with carvings and mosaics that show similarity to mosaics found at Qasr al-Hallabat.

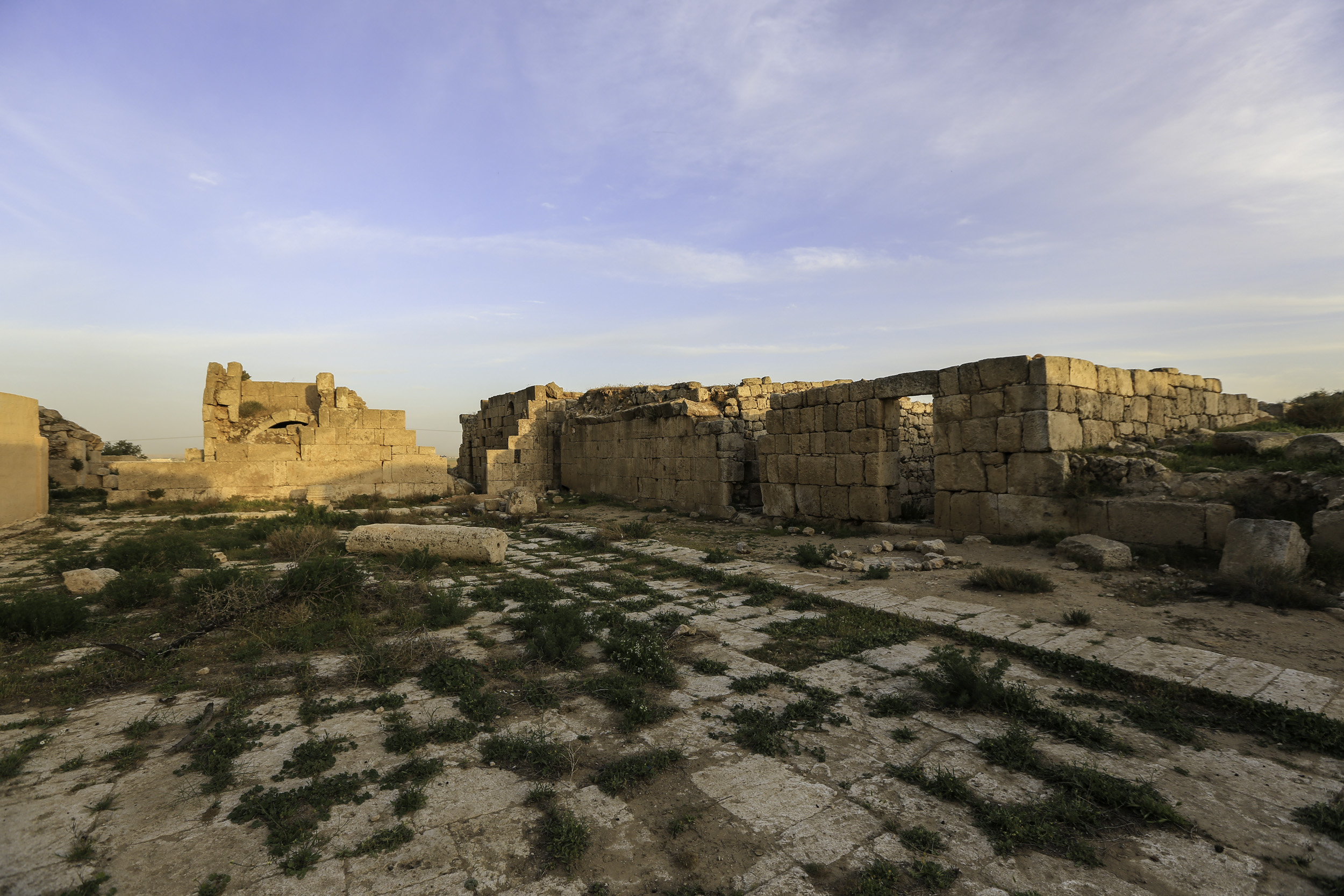
The courtyard of the qasr

=== Mosque and cemetery ===
Near the palace there are two noteworthy sites, a small, rectangular mosque and a cemetery. Attached to the mosque is one of the oldest minarets in the world, known as the Al-Qastal Minaret. The tombs in the cemetery are noteworthy for being oriented facing Petra, as opposed to Mecca. The error is 29° West.

=== Water system ===
Water for the palace came from a large stone dam, a reservoir as well as over 70 small cisterns that had a combined capacity of over 2 million cubic meters of water.

=== Current state ===
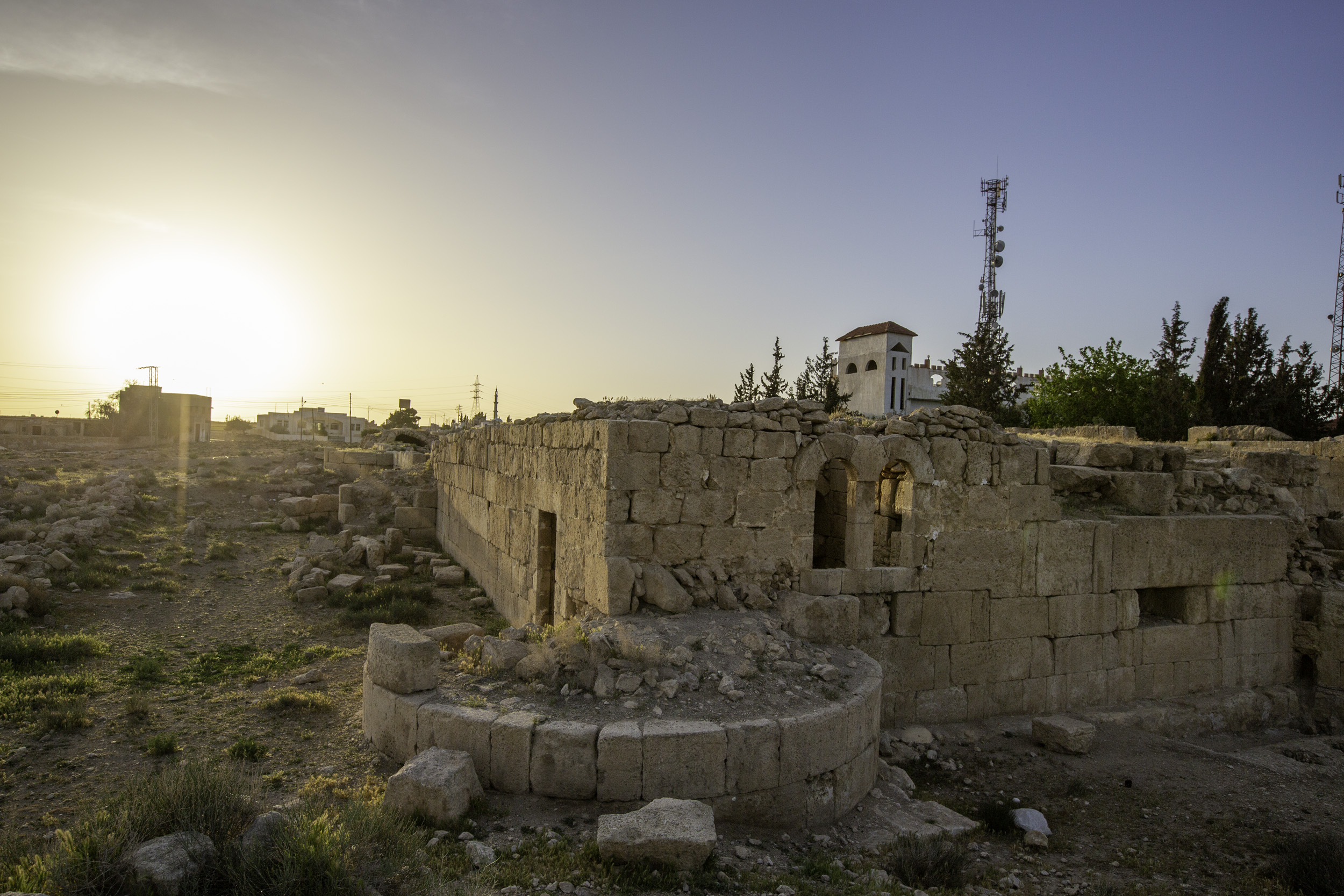
Umayyad qasr

Today the site lies in ruins and a portion of the palace has been covered by a modern house owned by a powerful clan who appropriated much of the site and used architectural elements of the qasr as decoration.

== See also ==
- Desert castles
