= Uthman ibn Abi al-As =

Companion of the Islamic prophet Muhammad

Uthman ibn Abi al-As al-Thaqafi
- عثمان بن أبي العاص

Governor of Ta'if
- In office December 630 – 636
- Preceded by: Post established
- Succeeded by: Al-Hakam ibn Abi al-As al-Thaqafi

Governor of Bahrayn and Oman
- In office 636–637
- Preceded by: Al-Ala al-Hadhrami
- Succeeded by: Al-Ala al-Hadhrami
- In office 638–650
- Preceded by: Al-Ala al-Hadhrami

Personal details
- Born: Unknown Ta'if
- Died: 671, 672 or 675 Basra
- Relations: Umm Muhammad bint Abd Allah (granddaughter); Al-Hakam (brother); Al-Mughira (brother); Abu Umayya (brother); Abu Amr (brother); Hafs (half-brother)
- Children: Abd Allah
- Parents: Abu al-As ibn Bishr ibn Abd ibn Duhman (father); Fatima bint Abd Allah (mother)

Military service
- Allegiance: Rashidun Caliphate
- Branch/service: Rashidun army
- Years of service: 632–650
- Battles/wars: Ridda wars Arab conquest of Iran: Capture of Tawwaj (640); Battle of Reishahr (641); Capture of Arrajan (643 or 644)

Uthman ibn Abi al-As al-Thaqafi (Arabic: عثمان بن أبي العاص, romanized: ʿUthmān ibn Abī al-ʿĀṣ; died 671 or 675) was a companion of the Islamic prophet Muhammad from the tribe of Banu Thaqif and the governor of Bahrayn (eastern Arabia) and Oman (southeastern Arabia) in 636–650, during the reigns of caliphs Umar (r. 634–644) and Uthman (r. 644–656). During his governorship he led military campaigns against the Sasanian Persians in Fars. After his dismissal, he settled with his brothers in Basra where he was granted a large estate by the caliph. He transmitted numerous hadiths to the scholar al-Hasan al-Basri and died in the city.

== Early life and governorship of Ta'if ==
Uthman was a son of Abu al-As ibn Bishr ibn Abd ibn Duhman of the Banu Thaqif. The Thaqif were the dominant tribe of the town of Ta'if in the Hejaz (western Arabia). Uthman belonged to the prominent Banu Hutayt family of the Banu Jusham, which was one of two principal branches of the Thaqif. Uthman had five brothers, al-Hakam, al-Mughira, Abu Umayya, Abu Amr—all of whom were sons of Uthman's mother Fatima bint Abd Allah—and Hafs. According to a different account, Uthman's mother was Safiyya, a daughter of the founder of the Umayyad house, Umayya ibn Abd Shams. Uthman's wife, Rayhana, belonged to the same house, being the daughter of Umayya's son Abu al-As.

Uthman was the youngest member of a six-man delegation of Thaqif representatives sent to establish peace with the Islamic prophet Muhammad on 9 December 630, shortly before the Muslim conquest of their city in 631. The delegation embraced Islam during this meeting, though the 9th-century historians al-Waqidi and Umar ibn Shabba hold Uthman had already converted to Islam during a previous visit to Muhammad in Medina, but had kept it secret from his tribe. Despite his youth, Muhammad declared Uthman governor of Ta'if. His appointment stemmed from his apparent zeal in studying Islam and the Quran, as testified to Muhammad by Abu Bakr, the future first caliph (leader of the Muslim community). Uthman's jurisdiction was over the settled inhabitants of Ta'if and its environs (the Hawazin nomads were governed by Malik ibn Awf al-Nasri) and he remained in the post at the time of Muhammad's death in 632. He was the first member of the Thaqif to achieve prominence under Islam.

After the death of Muhammad, many Arab tribes rebelled against the nascent Muslim state. Uthman played a key role maintaining the loyalty of the Thaqif to Islam. During the Ridda wars launched by Abu Bakr against the rebel tribes, Uthman dispatched a force from Ta'if against rebel clans from the tribes of Azd, Bajila and Khath'am in Yemen (southwestern Arabia). He later raised an army from the city under the command of his brother to assist Medina's war efforts. Abu Bakr kept Uthman in his post as did his successor Caliph Umar.

== Governor of Bahrayn and Oman ==
Uthman was appointed governor of Bahrayn (eastern Arabia) and Oman (southeastern Arabia) by Umar in 636, following the dismissal of al-Ala al-Hadhrami. The province of the Yamama (central Arabia) was administratively attached to Bahrayn at the time. Uthman was permitted by Umar to nominate his brother al-Hakam as his replacement in Ta'if.

Uthman dispatched naval expeditions against the ports and positions of the Sasanian Empire and further east to the borders of India. The first Arab naval raids against the ports of the Indian subcontinent were carried out on the orders of Uthman. According to the history of al-Baladhuri, the raids targeted Thane (near modern Mumbai), Debal and Bharuch. The assault on Thane, the first Arab raid in India, was commanded by Uthman's brother al-Hakam and was a success, the Arabs returning to Oman without incurring any fatalities. The following raid on Debal was commanded by another brother, al-Mughira. Al-Hakam led the raid on Bharuch. The raids were launched in c. 636 according to al-Baladhuri. The modern historian Nabi Bakhsh Khan Baloch suspects that if the raids against the Indian coast were actually undertaken, they likely occurred in late 636. The naval operations were launched without Umar's sanction and he disapproved of them upon learning of the operations, citing his fear for the safety of Arab troops at sea. The contemporary Armenian historian Sebeos confirms these Arab raids against the Sasanian littoral. According to Baloch, the reasons for Uthman's initiative are not identified by the medieval sources and were possibly zeal-driven adventures for the cause of jihad (holy struggle).

In 637 Uthman was recalled from Bahrayn by Umar and reappointed to Ta'if, likely as a consequence of his unilateral launch of naval raids against India. He was restored to Bahrayn in 638 in the aftermath of an abortive naval raid by al-Ala against the Sasanian province of Fars, which ended in heavy Arab losses. In 638–639 Uthman led in person a major assault along the coast of Fars. His brother al-Hakam accompanied him, while he left al-Mughira to oversee administrative affairs in Bahrayn as his deputy. In 639 or 640, Uthman and al-Hakam captured and garrisoned Arab troops in the Fars town of Tawwaj near the Persian Gulf coast, southwest of modern Shiraz. In 641 Uthman established his permanent headquarters at Tawwaj, which he fortified. From Tawwaj in the same year, he captured the city of Reishahr and killed the Sasanian governor of Fars, Shahruk. By 642 Uthman subjugated the cities of Jarreh, Kazerun and al-Nubindjan.

About 643, Uthman's forces were joined by Abu Musa al-Ash'ari, the Muslim governor of Basra, who had been fighting against the Sasanians on the Iraqi front. Uthman retained overall command and together, they conquered Arrajan and the area of Shiraz, while Uthman conquered the city of Darabjird further east without Abu Musa. These conquests occurred between 643 and 644. Umar died in the latter year and was succeeded by Uthman ibn Affan, who retained Uthman in his post for about six more years. Uthman was unable to capture the Sasanian strongholds of Istakhr and Jur (Firuzabad) in mountainous central Fars, which were conquered in 649 by the Muslim governor of Basra, Abd Allah ibn Amir. In that year, Ibn Amir was given supreme command over the armies of Uthman and Abu Musa in Iran.

== Later life, death and legacy ==
Uthman was dismissed by the caliph and retired to Basra after 650. In February 650 he was granted by the caliph a large estate near the city, in al-Ubulla (Apologos) along the Euphrates river, from which he bestowed plots to each of his brothers to build on. The canal dug on the estate was called Shatt Uthman after him. Uthman died in Basra in 671, 672 or 675.

The prominent Islamic theologian and scholar al-Hasan al-Basri transmitted hadiths from Uthman during his time in Basra. From a total of twenty-nine hadiths reportedly transmitted by Uthman, three have been recorded in the Sahih Muslim and the remainder in various hadith volumes.

A granddaughter of Uthman, Umm Muhammad bint Abd Allah ibn Uthman, was married to the general and governor of Khurasan, Salm ibn Ziyad. During Salm's expedition in 681, she became known as the first Arab woman to cross the Oxus river into Transoxiana.

== Bibliography ==
- Ahmed, Asad Q. (2010). The Religious Elite of the Early Islamic Ḥijāz: Five Prosopographical Case Studies. Oxford: University of Oxford Linacre College Unit for Prosopographical Research. ISBN 978-1-900934-13-8.
- Baloch, Nabi Bakhsh Khan (1946). "The Probable Date of the First Arab Expeditions to India". Islamic Culture. 20 (3): 250–266.
- Baloch, Nabi Bakhsh Khan (1953). "Muhammad ibn al-Qasim: A Study of His Family Background and Personality". Islamic Culture. 1927 (4): 242–271.
- Blankinship, Khalid Yahya, ed. (1993). The History of al-Ṭabarī, Volume XI: The Challenge to the Empires. SUNY Series in Near Eastern Studies. Albany, New York: State University of New York Press. ISBN 978-0-7914-0851-3.
- Donner, Fred M. (1981). The Early Islamic Conquests. Princeton: Princeton University Press. ISBN 0-691-05327-8.
- Donner, Fred M., ed. (1993). The History of al-Ṭabarī, Volume X: The Conquest of Arabia, A.D. 632–633/A.H. 11. SUNY Series in Near Eastern Studies. Albany, New York: State University of New York Press. ISBN 978-0-7914-1071-4.
- Friedmann, Yohanan, ed. (1992). The History of al-Ṭabarī, Volume XII: The Battle of al-Qādisīyyah and the Conquest of Syria and Palestine. SUNY Series in Near Eastern Studies. Albany, New York: State University of New York Press. ISBN 978-0-7914-0733-2.
- Friedmann, Yohanan (1970). "Minor Problems in al-Baladhuri's Account of the Conquest of Sind". Rivista degli studi orientali. 45 (3): 253–260.
- Poonawala, Ismail, ed. (1990). The History of al-Ṭabarī, Volume IX: The Last Years of the Prophet: The Formation of the State, A.D. 630–632/A.H. 8–11. SUNY Series in Near Eastern Studies. Albany, New York: State University of New York Press. ISBN 978-0-88706-691-7.
- Hoyland, Robert G. (2015). In God's Path: The Arab Conquests and the Creation of an Islamic Empire. Oxford: Oxford University Press. ISBN 978-0-19-991636-8.
- Howard, I. K. A., ed. (1990). The History of al-Ṭabarī, Volume XIX: The Caliphate of Yazīd ibn Muʿāwiyah, A.D. 680–683/A.H. 60–64. SUNY Series in Near Eastern Studies. Albany, New York: State University of New York Press. ISBN 978-0-7914-0040-1.
- Ishaq, Mohammad (1945). "A Peep Into the First Arab Expeditions to India under the Companions of the Prophet". Islamic Culture. 19 (2): 109–114.
- Lecker, M. (2000). "Thakīf". In Bearman, P. J.; Bianquis, Th.; Bosworth, C. E.; van Donzel, E. & Heinrichs, W. P. (eds.). The Encyclopaedia of Islam, Second Edition. Volume X: T–U. Leiden: E. J. Brill. p. 432. ISBN 978-90-04-11211-7.
- Lecker, Michael (2016) [2005]. People, Tribes and Society in Arabia Around the Time of Muhammad. Abingdon: Routledge. ISBN 978-0-86078-963-5.
