= Samayfa ibn Nakur =

Muslim military commander (died 657)

Dhu al-Kala Samayfa ibn Nakur al-Himyari (Arabic: ذُو ٱلْكَلاَع سْمَيْفَع بْنُ نَاكُور الْحِمْيَرِيّ, romanized: Dhu al-Kalāʿ Samayfaʿ ibn Nākūr al-Ḥimyarī) was a commander of the Muslim conquest of Syria in the 630s and leader of the Himyar tribe in Islamic Syria and founder of its noble household, the Dhu al-Kala. He was based in the city of Homs where the Himyar and other Yemenite tribes dominated the Muslim garrison and heeded Samayfa over the overall governor of Syria, Mu'awiya ibn Abi Sufyan. He fought as one of the elite commanders in the latter's army at the Battle of Siffin and his death in combat led to the Himyar's decline in Syria.

== Life ==
Samayfa is first mentioned in the historical record as the head of the Dhu al-Kala family, the most powerful in Yemen in the days of the Islamic prophet Muhammad, during the caliphate of Abu Bakr (r. 632–634). He participated in the Muslim conquest of Syria in the 630s and like many other Yemenite (South Arabian) tribesmen in the conquest army's ranks, settled in Homs. There, he became one of the two principal leaders of his tribe, the Himyar, the other head being Dhu al-Asbah Kurayb ibn Abraha. Samayfa was married to the latter's sister Kurayba.

According to the historian Wilferd Madelung, Samayfa originally intended to settle in Damascus, the leading center of Syria, where he could firmly establish Himyarite dominance over the region. His Yemenite supporters referred to him as the "king of Himyar" in deference to his leadership of the tribe and ambitions to reestablished the ancient Himyarite kingdom in Syria. This was in defiance of the Quraysh, the tribe of the Islamic prophet Muhammad and the caliphs, who sought to maintain for themselves the dominant influence in Syria. Samayfa's ambitions may have prompted the Medina-based caliph Umar (r. 634–644) to shore up support for his deputies in Syria, the Sufyanid brothers Yazid ibn Abi Sufyan and Mu'awiya and their tribal allies the Banu Kalb, to stifle the Himyarites. During Mu'awiya's governorship of Syria in the 640s, Samayfa was known to have acted counter to Mu'awiya's orders in Homs, where the Yemenite troops followed his command.

Samayfa was one of the more notable commanders in the army of Syria's governor, Mu'awiya, during his confrontation against caliph Ali at the Battle of Siffin in 657, part of the First Fitna. By then, Mu'awiya had secured the support of the Yemenites of Homs against Ali. On 27 July, in one of the engagements of the many days' long confrontation at Siffin, Samayfa led his Himyarite troops against the Rabi'a contingent in Ali's army. He was slain, along with the son of Umar, Ubayd Allah.

== Legacy ==
While Mu'awiya was distraught at the loss of Ubayd Allah, Madelung holds that he was happy with the death of Samayfa, likely seeing it as a blow to Himyarite designs on Syria. Indeed, the killings of Samayfa and the Himyarite leader of the Alhan clan in a clash on the previous day, marked the gradual deterioration of their tribe's influence in Syria.

His son Shurahbil was a leading commander for the Umayyad caliphs and was killed at the Battle of Khazir against partisans of Ali's family. Other members of the Dhu al-Kala family served as governors and commanders for the Umayyad caliphs, though their relationship to Samayfa is not precisely defined.

== Bibliography ==
- Crone, Patricia (1980). Slaves on Horses: The Evolution of the Islamic Polity (1980 ed.). Cambridge: Cambridge University Press. ISBN 978-0521229616.
- Donner, Fred M., ed. (1993). The History of al-Ṭabarī, Volume X: The Conquest of Arabia, A.D. 632–633/A.H. 11. SUNY Series in Near Eastern Studies. Albany, New York: State University of New York Press. ISBN 978-0-7914-1071-4.
- Madelung, Wilferd (1997). The Succession to Muhammad: A Study of the Early Caliphate. Cambridge: Cambridge University Press. ISBN 0-521-56181-7.
