= Tawwaj =

Medieval city in Fars Province, Iran

Tawwaj, Tawwaz or Tavvaz (Middle Persian: Tuzag; New Persian: توج) was a medieval city in Fars (Pars) in modern Iran, located southwest of Shiraz.

== Description ==
Tawwaj was located on or close to the Shapur River in the region of Fars, about 65 kilometers (40 mi) from the Persian Gulf coast. Its site has not been identified. It has been associated with the Taoke mentioned by the classical Greek historian Arrian, which was located on the bank of the Granis River and close to a Persian royal residence. However, it has also been associated with the Achaemenid site of Tamukkan; the finding of a ruined Achaemenid bastion near Borazjan supports this theory. According to the Middle Persian geography text Šahrestānīhā ī Ērānšahr, the city (called Tuzag) was founded by the Kayanid queen Humay Chehrzad, a daughter of king Kay Bahman, who is identified with the fifth Achaemenid monarch Artaxerxes I (r. 465–424 BC).

During the Sasanian and early Islamic period it served as an important commercial center. It was captured and garrisoned by an Arab Muslim army commanded by the brothers al-Hakam and Uthman ibn Abi al-As in c. 640. Tawwaj thereafter became Uthman's headquarters during his military campaigns against the Sasanians in Fars. A mosque was built in the town from that period, but had been completely ruined by the lifetime of the Persian geographer Hamdallah Mustawfi (1281–1349).

The 10th-century Persian geographer Istakhri describes Tawwaj as located in a lowland gorge with numerous date palms, a considerably hot climate and being close in size to the Fars town of Arrajan. It was major trade center, well known for its gold-embroidered, woven carpets. He reports that the town was populated by Arabs from Syria brought by the Buyid ruler Adud al-Dawla (r. 949–983). By the 12th century, most of the town fell into ruins, and by the 14th century it was in a total ruinous state.

== Bibliography ==
- Baloch, Nabi Bakhsh Khan (July 1946). "The Probable Date of the First Arab Expeditions to India". Islamic Culture. 20 (3): 250-266.
- Barthold, W. (1984). Bosworth, C. E. (ed.). An Historical Geography of Iran. Translated by Svat Soucek. Princeton: Princeton University Press. ISBN 0-691-05418-5.
- Hoyland, Robert G. (2015). In God's Path: The Arab Conquests and the Creation of an Islamic Empire. Oxford: Oxford University Press. ISBN 978-0-19-991636-8.
- Miri, Negin (2012). "Sasanian Pars: Historical Geography and Administrative Organization". Sasanika: 1–183.
- Smith, G. Rex, ed. (1994). The History of al-Ṭabarī, Volume XIV: The Conquest of Iran, A.D. 641–643/A.H. 21–23. SUNY Series in Near Eastern Studies. Albany, New York: State University of New York Press. ISBN 978-0-7914-1293-0.
- le Strange, Guy (1905). The Lands of the Eastern Caliphate: Mesopotamia, Persia, and Central Asia from the Moslem Conquest to the Time of Timur. Cambridge University Press.
