= Al-Ala ibn al-Hadrami =

7th-century Muslim commander and governor

Al-Ala ibn al-Hadrami العلاء بن الحضرمي

Governor of Bahrayn
- In office 632–636
- Preceded by: Aban ibn Sa'id
- Succeeded by: Uthman ibn Abi al-As
- In office 637–638
- Preceded by: Uthman ibn Abi al-As
- Succeeded by: Uthman ibn Abi al-As

Personal details
- Born: South Arabia (Hadhramaut)
- Died: c. 635–636 or 641–642 Bahrayn or Basra
- Relations: Banu Sadif (tribe); Abd Allah ibn Amr al-Hadrami (nephew)
- Parent: Abd Allah ibn Imad al-Hadrami

Military service
- Allegiance: Rashidun Caliphate
- Battles/wars: Ridda Wars; Muslim conquest of Persia

Al-Ala ibn al-Hadrami (Arabic: العلاء بن الحضرمي, romanized: al-ʿAlāʾ ibn al-Haḍramī; died 635–636 or 641–642) was an early Muslim commander, the tax collector for Bahrayn (eastern Arabia) under the Islamic prophet Muhammad in c. 631–632, and governor of Bahrayn in 632–636 and 637–638 under caliphs Abu Bakr (r. 632–634) and Umar (r. 634–636). Under Abu Bakr, al-Ala suppressed a rebellion by a scion of the pro-Sasanian Lakhmid dynasty as part of the Ridda Wars. Under Umar, he launched naval expeditions against the Sasanians, the last of which ended in disaster for the Arabs and was the cause of his dismissal. He was last appointed governor of Basra but died on his way to assume office.

== Origins ==
Al-Ala belonged to the South Arabian tribe of Sadif. His full name was al-Ala ibn Abd Allah ibn Imad al-Hadrami. He was a client or confederate of the wealthy Banu Umayya clan of the Quraysh tribe in Mecca. Al-Ala was among the early converts to Islam, before Muhammad's conquest of Mecca and the mass conversion of the Quraysh in 630.

== Commander and governor in Bahrayn ==
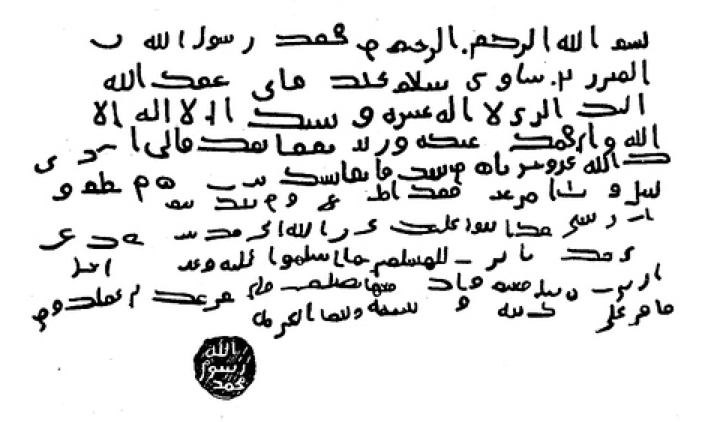
Facsimile of a letter sent by the Islamic prophet Muhammad to Mundhir ibn Suwa, the ruler of Bahrayn in 628 CE

Al-Ala was dispatched by the Islamic prophet Muhammad to collect the tax from the inhabitants of Bahrayn (eastern Arabia) in late 631 or early 632. The ruler of the region, Mundhir ibn Suwa, was allied with Muhammad. Al-Ala's responsibility may have been confined to the part of Bahrayn around Qatif, with the other part, around al-Khatt, under Aban ibn Sa'id of the Banu Umayya. On the other hand, al-Ala may have been replaced altogether by Aban before Muhammad died in 632.

After Muhammad's death, tribesmen of the Rabi'a group rebelled against Mundhir and forced the flight of Bahrayn's tax agents, presumably al-Ala and/or Aban, while Mundhir died shortly after. The first caliph (Muhammad's successor as leader of the Muslim community) Abu Bakr (r. 632–634) dispatched al-Ala to reinforce Mundhir's supporters and suppress the rebellion. The rebels were led by a descendant of the Lakhmids, former client kings of the Persian Sasanian Empire. Al-Ala was supported by the mostly Abd al-Qays tribesmen under their chief al-Jarud and defeated the rebels at al-Juwatha in the al-Hasa oasis in Bahrayn after withstanding a lengthy siege by the rebels. Arab forces proceeded to capture the island of Darin off the coast of Qatif. Al-Ala's operations against the settlements of Bahrayn continued into late 634, during the reign of Abu Bakr's successor Umar (r. 634–644).

Map of Bahrayn, the Yamama, and Uman in the 9th–10th centuries

Under Umar, al-Ala conquered the Sasanian Persian outposts along the coast of Bahrayn and launched a naval expedition under Arfaja, one of his lieutenants, which conquered an unspecified island off the Iranian coast. The Arab force was withdrawn from the island possibly due to the disapproval of Umar, who was opposed to naval campaigning. Umar replaced al-Ala with Uthman ibn Abi al-As al-Thaqafi in 636 or 637. The reason for the dismissal, according to the historian Baloch, was two-fold: Umar's uneasiness keeping a governor that the Islamic prophet had dismissed and Uthman's request for the position.

Al-Ala was nonetheless reappointed over Bahrayn in 637 after Umar recalled Uthman to his former post at Ta'if, possibly due to the caliph's displeasure at Uthman's naval expeditions against Indian ports which the caliph deemed an unnecessary risk to his men's safety. Al-Ala's jurisdiction also spanned the Yamama region adjacent to Bahrayn to the west. Despite orders to the contrary, al-Ala launched a naval expedition, though directed against the Sasanians in Fars. The expedition, though successful in its attack, ended in disaster for the Arabs when their vessels were wrecked at sea and al-Ala had to be rescued. Upon receiving news of the situation in the Persian Gulf, Umar issued orders condemning and dismissing al-Ala from the governorship of Bahrayn and the Yamama in 638. He was concurrently reassigned to the Sasanian front in Iraq, where he was placed under the command of his rival Sa'd ibn Abi Waqqas. The punishment of al-Ala for contravening Umar's prohibitions against naval expeditions likely influenced governors in other provinces of the Caliphate, especially Mu'awiya ibn Abi Sufyan in Syria, to not launch naval operations during Umar's rule, despite their ambitions to do so.

== Appointment to Basra and death ==
The early Islamic sources date al-Ala's death to the year 14 AH (635 or 636 CE) or 21 AH (641 or 642 CE). He died on his way to Basra, to which Umar had appointed him governor. According to the historian, the 14 AH date is incompatible with the record of al-Ala's career, while the historian states the 21 AH date as the "less probable" year of al-Ala's death.

== See also ==
- Sahaba
- Khamis Mosque
- Islam in Bahrain
- Jawatha Mosque

== Bibliography ==
- Al-Baladhuri (March 2011). The Origins of the Islamic State. Translated by Philip Khuri Hitti. Cosimo, Incorporated. ISBN 978-1-61640-534-2. 1616405341.
- Baloch, Nabi Bakhsh Khan (July 1946). "The Probable Date of the First Arab Expeditions to India". Islamic Culture. 20 (3): 250–266.
- Blankinship, Khalid Yahya, ed. (1993). The History of al-Ṭabarī, Volume XI: The Challenge to the Empires. SUNY Series in Near Eastern Studies. Albany, New York: State University of New York Press. ISBN 978-0-7914-0851-3.
- Donner, Fred M., ed. (1993). The History of al-Ṭabarī, Volume X: The Conquest of Arabia, A.D. 632–633/A.H. 11. SUNY Series in Near Eastern Studies. Albany, New York: State University of New York Press. ISBN 978-0-7914-1071-4.
- Friedmann, Yohanan, ed. (1992). The History of al-Ṭabarī, Volume XII: The Battle of al-Qādisīyyah and the Conquest of Syria and Palestine. SUNY Series in Near Eastern Studies. Albany, New York: State University of New York Press. ISBN 978-0-7914-0733-2.
- Kennedy, Hugh (2007). The Great Arab Conquests: How the Spread of Islam Changed the World We Live In. Philadelphia: Da Capo Press. ISBN 978-0-306-81585-0.
- Rentz, G & Mulligan, W. E. (1960). "Bahrayn". In Gibb, H. A. R.; Kramers, J. H.; Lévi-Provençal, E.; Schacht, J.; Lewis, B. & Pellat, Ch. (eds.). The Encyclopaedia of Islam, Second Edition. Volume I: A–B. Leiden: E. J. Brill. pp. 941–944. OCLC 495469456.
- Shoufani, Elias S. (1973). Al-Riddah and the Muslim Conquest of Arabia. Toronto: University of Toronto Press. ISBN 0-8020-1915-3.
- Smith, G. Rex, ed. (1994). The History of al-Ṭabarī, Volume XIV: The Conquest of Iran, A.D. 641–643/A.H. 21–23. SUNY Series in Near Eastern Studies. Albany, New York: State University of New York Press. ISBN 978-0-7914-1293-0.
