= Battle of Marj al-Saffar (635) =

634 CE conflict between the Rashidun Caliphate and Byzantine Empire

Battle of Marj Al-Saffar
- Part of the Muslim conquest of Syria (Arab–Byzantine wars)
| Date | 23 January 635 |
| Location | Marj al-Saffar, Syria |
| Result | Rashidun Caliphate victory |

Belligerents
| Rashidun Caliphate | Byzantine Empire |

Commanders and leaders
| Khalid ibn al-Walid | Thomas (son-in-law of Heraclius) |

The Battle of Marj al-Saffar took place in early 635 between armies of the Rashidun Caliphate and the Byzantine Empire. At Damascus, Thomas, son-in-law of Byzantine Emperor Heraclius, was in charge. Receiving intelligence of the Muslim commander Khalid ibn al-Walid's march towards Damascus he prepared the defences of Damascus. He wrote to Emperor Heraclius for reinforcement, who was at Emesa that time. Moreover, Thomas, in order to get more time to prepare for a siege, sent the armies to delay, or if possible, halt Khalid's march on Damascus. One such army was defeated at the Battle of Yaqusa in mid-August 634 near Lake Tiberias 150 km from Damascus, another army that halted the Muslim advance to Damascus was defeated in the Battle of Marj al-Saffar on 23 January 635. It is said that Umm Hakim bint al-Harith ibn Hisham, a Muslim heroine, was involved in this battle and killed seven Byzantine soldiers.

== Sources ==
- Adamec, Ludwig W. (2017). "Chronology:635". Historical Dictionary of Islam. Rowman & Littlefield.
- Ahmed, Leila (1992). Women and Gender in Islam: Historical Roots to a Modern Debate. Yale University Press.
- War and Religion: An Encyclopedia of Faith and Conflict [3 Volumes] by X - 2017
