= Arjan bowl =

Bowl discovered accidentally near Behbahan in Iran

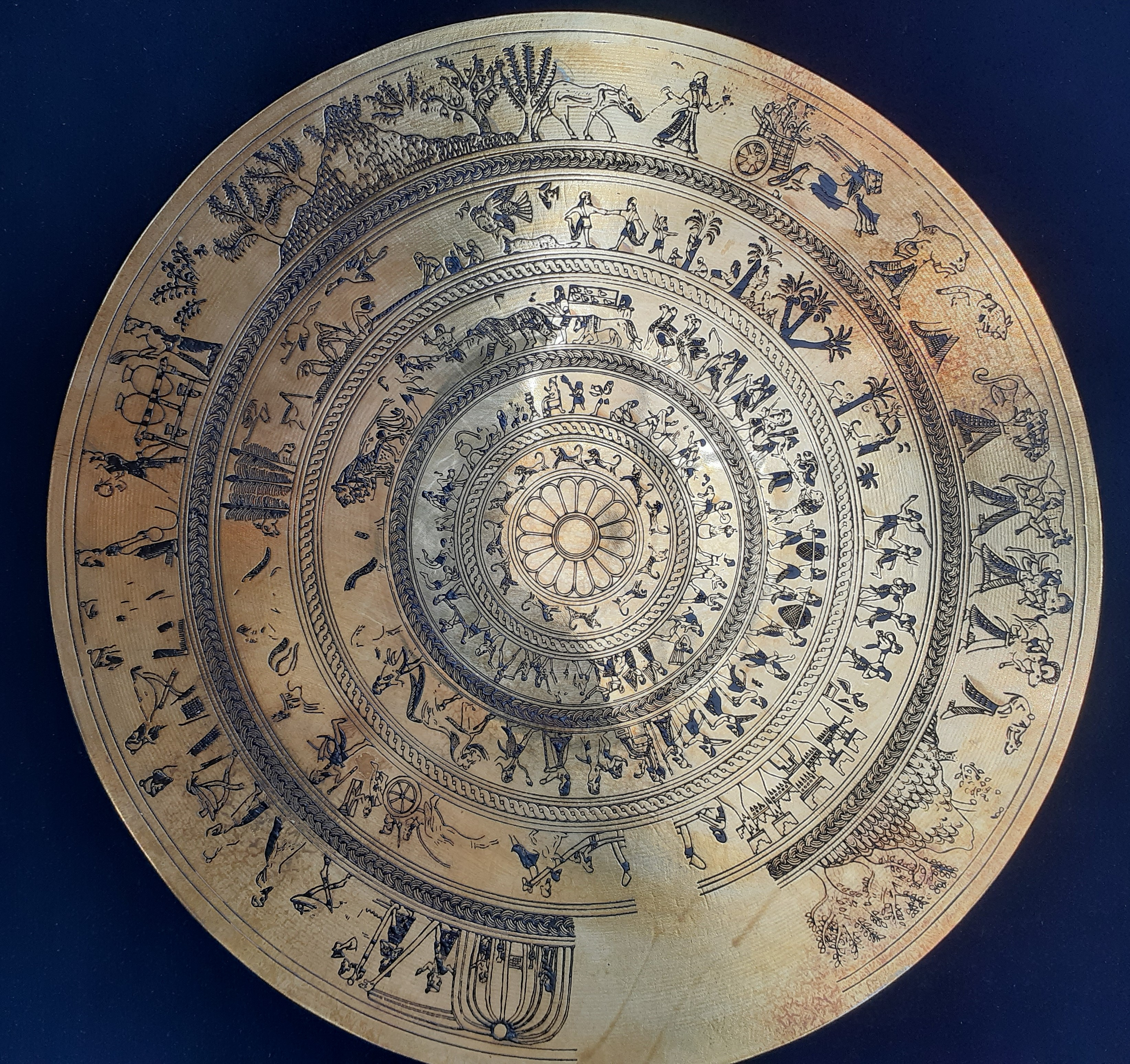
A Replica of Arjan bowl

Arjan bowl (Persian: Jaam-e Arjan) is a Phoenician bronze bowl dated between 800 B.C and 500 B.C. It was discovered in 1982 after a bulldozer working on the Marun Dam project cut into a rock tomb near Behbahan, Iran.

Arjan is the ancient name of Behbahan. Originated from the Elamite period, it measures 43.5 cm by 8.5 cm. The bowl is engraved with five concentric registers around a central rosette, and contains an inscription in the Elamite language which translates to "Kidin-Hutran son of Kurlush."

== Background ==
In 1982, the remains of a tomb from the 2nd millennium BCE was discovered near an archaeological site of Arjan. The tomb covers an area of about 3.75 km^{2} (1.45 sq mi), with only scattered traces of buildings, walls, a castle, a qanat, a dam, and a bridge across the nearby Marun river.

The tomb contains a large bronze coffin which had a golden ring, ninety-eight golden buttons, ten cylindrical vessels, a dagger, a silver bar, and a bronze tray with various images found with the coffin. The tray is called Arjan Bowl or Dezmone Starks and is more than three thousand years old. Arjan tray drawings include five painting circles in its center, a sixteen-pointed flower (similar to a Helianthus annuus sunflower, and a type of chrysanthemum). This flower symbolizes the sun and the wheel of destiny. A row of lions, cattle, and birds are associated with various rituals, and the seven circles or rings in the tray represent the sacred number seven. The number is sacred in Judaism and many other religions. The origin of this sanctity is not clear, but like many symbols of famous religions, it has a root in ancient primitive religions. The logo used by Iran at the 2020 Summer Olympics was the Arjan tray.

== Flowers of Sixteen Feathers ==
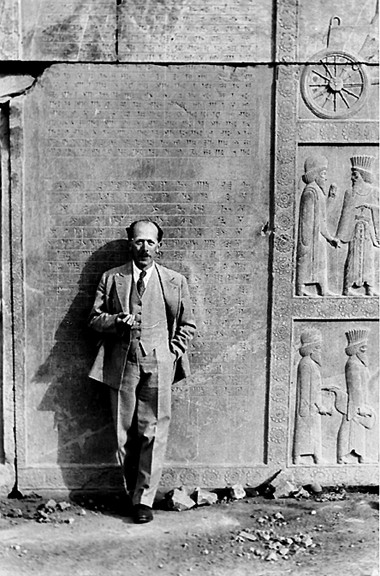
Wheel on the top right corner

The Flowers of Sixteen Feathers in the center of the Arjan tray is an important work that exists in many civilizations. Similar to the sunflower which was introduced as the Lotus, the Flower of Sixteen Feathers is a symbol and an icon of the Sun, the Spinning Wheel and the Goddess of Destiny - having a similarity with Inanna and star of Ishtar. Sumerian and Mesopotamian civilizations share similar symbolic concepts with the Flower of Sixteen Feathers. The real secret of this flower-like symbol has not yet been properly revealed.

The second circle of the Arjan Cup depicts lions, cattle and birds performing various rituals alongside seven circles or rings representing the number 7, sacred in Judaism and many other religions and sects. The flower-like shape was not correlated to the Lotus flower in the first periods, only being attributed in later times.

The Flower of Sixteen Feathers represents various concepts in many different cultures. Persian culture attributes it as a sunflower, not a lotus. Japan attributes the flower as its national emblem (which is also a symbol in Buddhist and Shinto temples), albeit varying in description having 16 leaves and corresponding to the symbol on the Arjan tray. The symbols in Persepolis and the Indian Drama Wheel are also similar. The flower-shaped wheel is known as Dour Flak (in Persian), the Dharmachakra, or the Wheel of Destiny. Its continuous use throughout history elicits its status as the oldest symbol and can be traced in Elam, the Achaemenids, and other civilizations. In Greater Khorasan, present-day Afghanistan and the Gandhara civilizations, the ancient footprints of this wheel can be seen in the same way today.

The Arjan bowl is somewhat overshadowed by its counterpart the Arjan Ring of Power, a golden artifact also named after Arjan (Arrajan), an ancient city of the Elamite era. The artifact dates back to the Neo-Elamite period (c. 1100 – 540 BC). Elam was an ancient Iranian civilization centered in the far west and south-west of what is now modern-day Iran, stretching from the lowlands of what is now Khuzestan and Ilam provinces as well as a small part of southern Iraq. The capital of Elam was Susa; in the Hellenistic age, Susiana ("the Land of Susa") was part of the Seleucid and the Parthian Empire. Later, the Sasanian Persians and Arabs took control.

== See also ==
- List of Mesopotamian deities
- Surya
- Dharmachakra
- Ashokan Pillars
- Prayer wheels
- Elamite
