= Arrajan Castle =

Castle in Khuzestan Province, Iran

Arrajan castle
- قلعه ارجان

General information
- Type: Castle
- Location: Behbahan, Iran

Arrajan castle (Persian: قلعه ارجان) is a historical castle located in Behbahan County in Khuzestan Province, The longevity of this fortress dates back to the historical Arrajan town of the Sasanian Empire.
