= Behbahan =

City in Khuzestan province, Iran

Behbahan Persian: بهبهان
- City
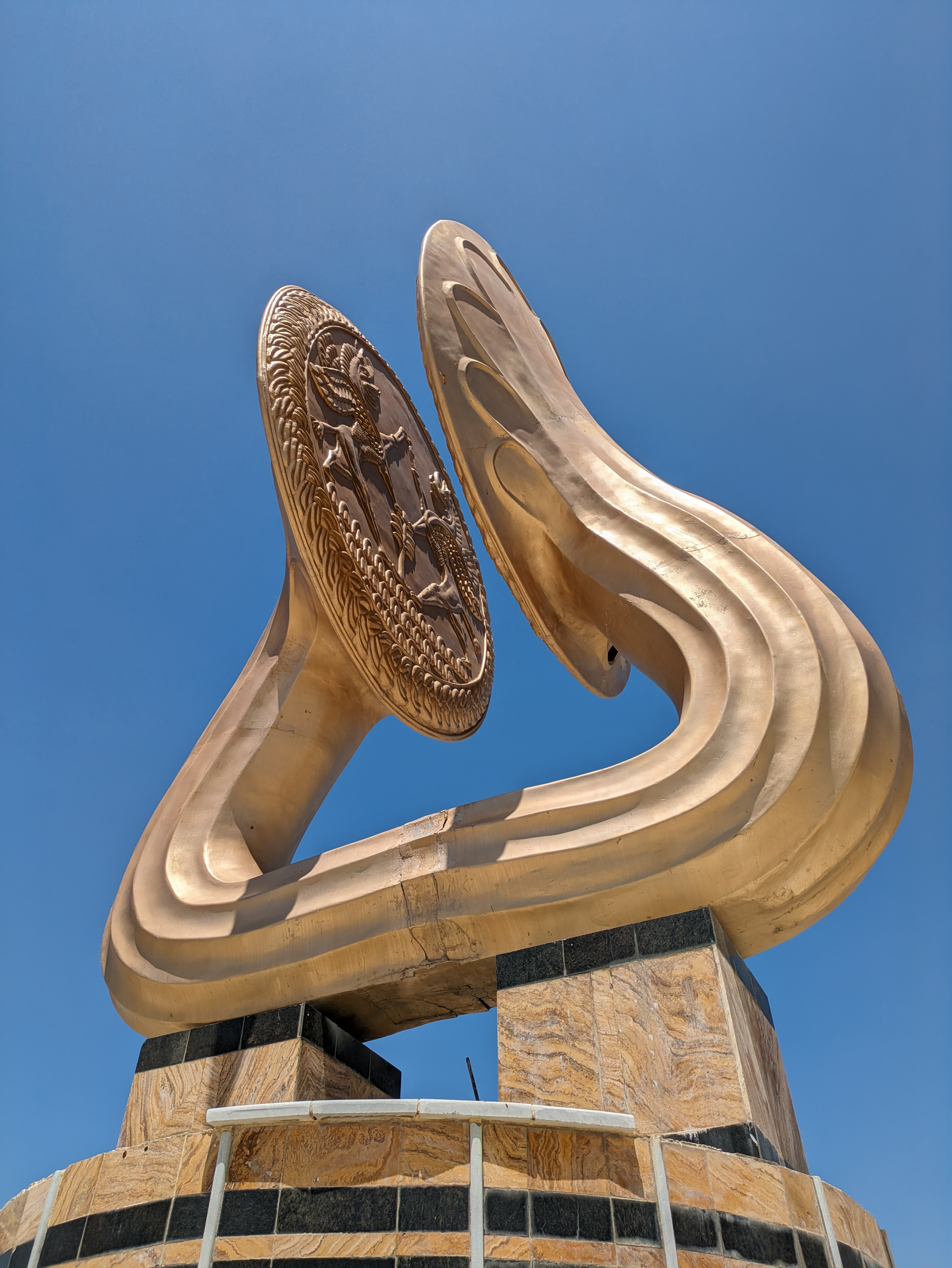
- Ring of Power, the historical symbol of Behbahan

- Location within Iran
- Coordinates: 30°35′39″N 50°14′36″E
- Country: Iran
- Province: Khuzestan
- County: Behbahan
- District: Central

Population (2016)
  - Total: 122,604
- Time zone: UTC+3:30 (IRST)

Behbahan (Persian: بهبهان) (Note: Also romanized as Behbahān and Behbehān) is a city in the Central District of Behbahan County, Khuzestan province, Iran, serving as the capital of both the county and the district.

== Etymology ==
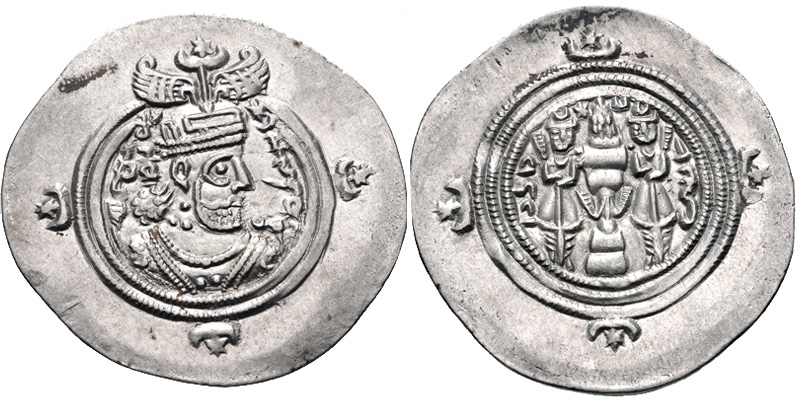
Sassanid coin of either Hormizd V or Hormizd VI, minted in present-day Behbahan

The origin of the word 'Behbahan' can be traced back to two distinct ideas. According to some scholars like Nowban, while the first part of the word, 'beh', means 'good', the latter, 'bahan', means palace or a very big house surrounded by orchards and gardens. It is well-documented that the region was an agricultural hub producing mainly olive, dates, citruses as well as flower gardens. The term Behbahan thus means a nice living area surrounded by gardens and farms.

Alternatively, it is suggested that the latter component of the word, namely 'bahan', might had been used to refer to a type of tent used in ancient times. In other words, after the downfall of the ancient city of Arrajan due to a series of devastating earthquakes, survivors unsurprisingly had to live in tents for some time. As they started to reconstruct the city, the name 'Behbahan' was used to denote that the new settlement is better than tents. However, the use of the word 'beh' as 'better' rather than 'good' is rarely, if ever, reported in Persian language. Also, there is no actual document of people using 'bahan' tents after the above-mentioned earthquakes. Resultantly, there needs to be more research on the etymology of the word Behbahan.

== History ==
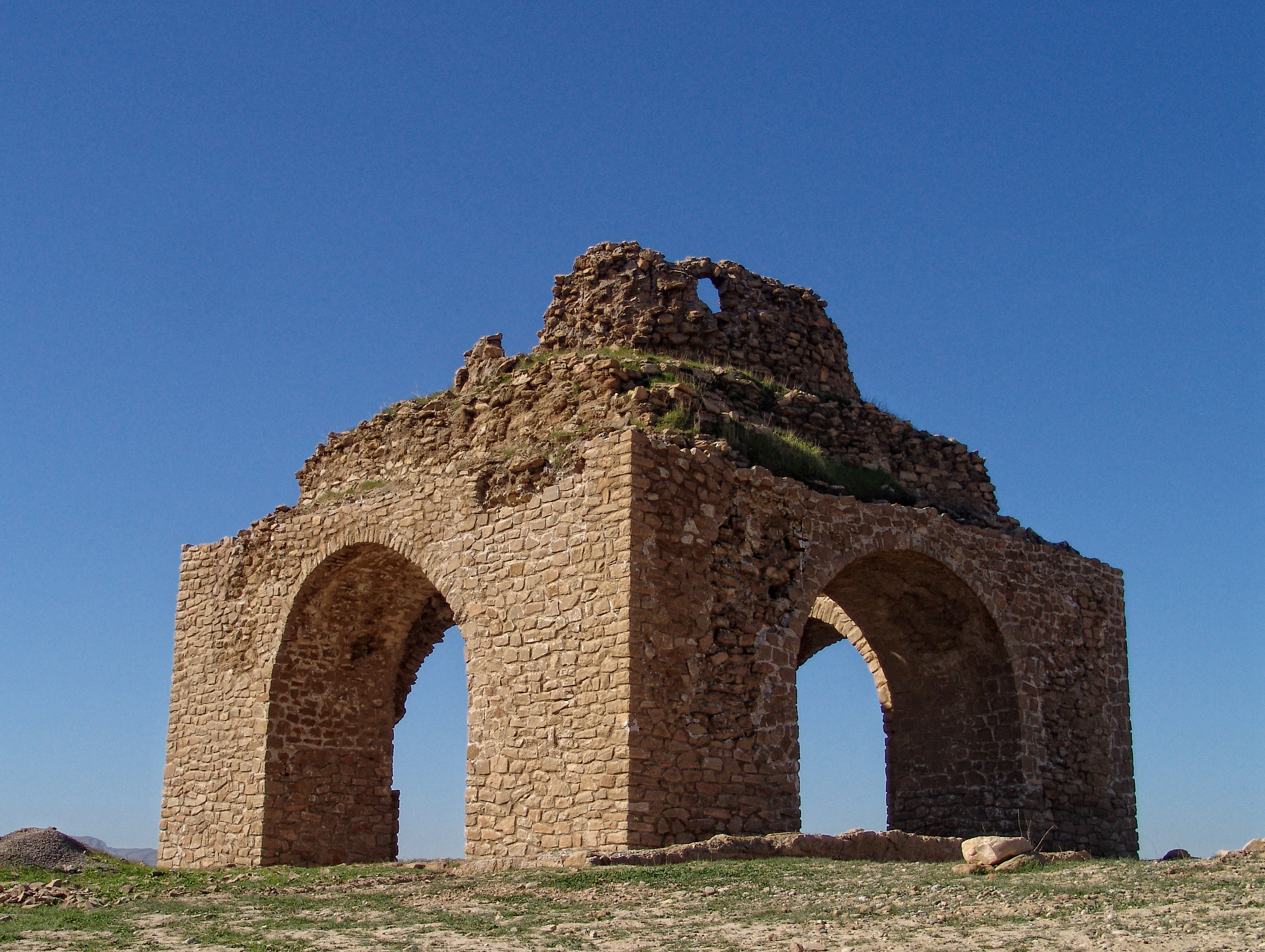
Sassanid Era Zoroastrian Fire-Temple of Arjan

History of Behbahan is indispensably intertwined with the ancient Iranian city of Argan (Arrajan) from Elamite era (3200–539 BC). During a dam construction project on Marun river in 1982, an accidental find was reported shocking local archeologists. It was identified as a neo-Elamite tomb (600-550 BC) of a noble person who later turned out to be the Elamite ruler Kidin-Hutran son of Kurlush. The tomb contains a large bronze coffin which had a golden ring of power, ninety-eight golden buttons, ten cylindrical vessels, a dagger, a silver bar, and a bronze tray called Arjan bowl with various images found with the coffin.

However, Arjan saw its downfall as it was hit by a series of earthquakes destroying almost all of its infrastructure. In the cross-road of Elamite and Persian empires, as claimed by Alvarez-Mon, the city had to be rebuilt.

The reconstruction was done by Kavadh I who was the Sasanian King of Kings of Iran from 488 to 531, with a two or three-year interruption. In 502-503, the king launched a campaign as part of the Anastasian War against northern Roman Mesopotamia, and deported 80,000 prisoners from Amida, Theodosiopolis, and possibly Martyropolis to Pars, some of whom are thought to have helped rebuild the city of Arrajan. This is why the names 'Ram-Qobad', 'Beram-Qobad', 'Abar-Qobad' and 'Beh az Amed-e Kavad' all used by later historians to refer to the reconstructed Arjan, include an element referring to king Kavad I.

Through time, Arrajan experienced ups and downs of the history and managed to survive even the Arab Muslim invasion albeit at the cost of almost all residents having to convert from Zoroasterianism to Islam. The name, as discussed above, was changed to Behbahan in the Islamic period.

== Demographics ==
Population history
Year	Pop.	±%
1956	29,886	—
1966	39,874	+33.4%
1976	49,378	+23.8%
1986	78,694	+59.4%
1991	85,846	+9.1%
1996	88,213	+2.8%
2006	99,204	+12.5%
2011	107,412	+8.3%
2016	122,604	+14.1%

=== Population ===
At the time of the 2006 National Census, the city's population was 99,204 in 24,204 households. The following census in 2011 counted 107,412 people in 29,280 households. The 2016 census measured the population of the city as 122,604 people in 35,826 households.

== Gallery ==
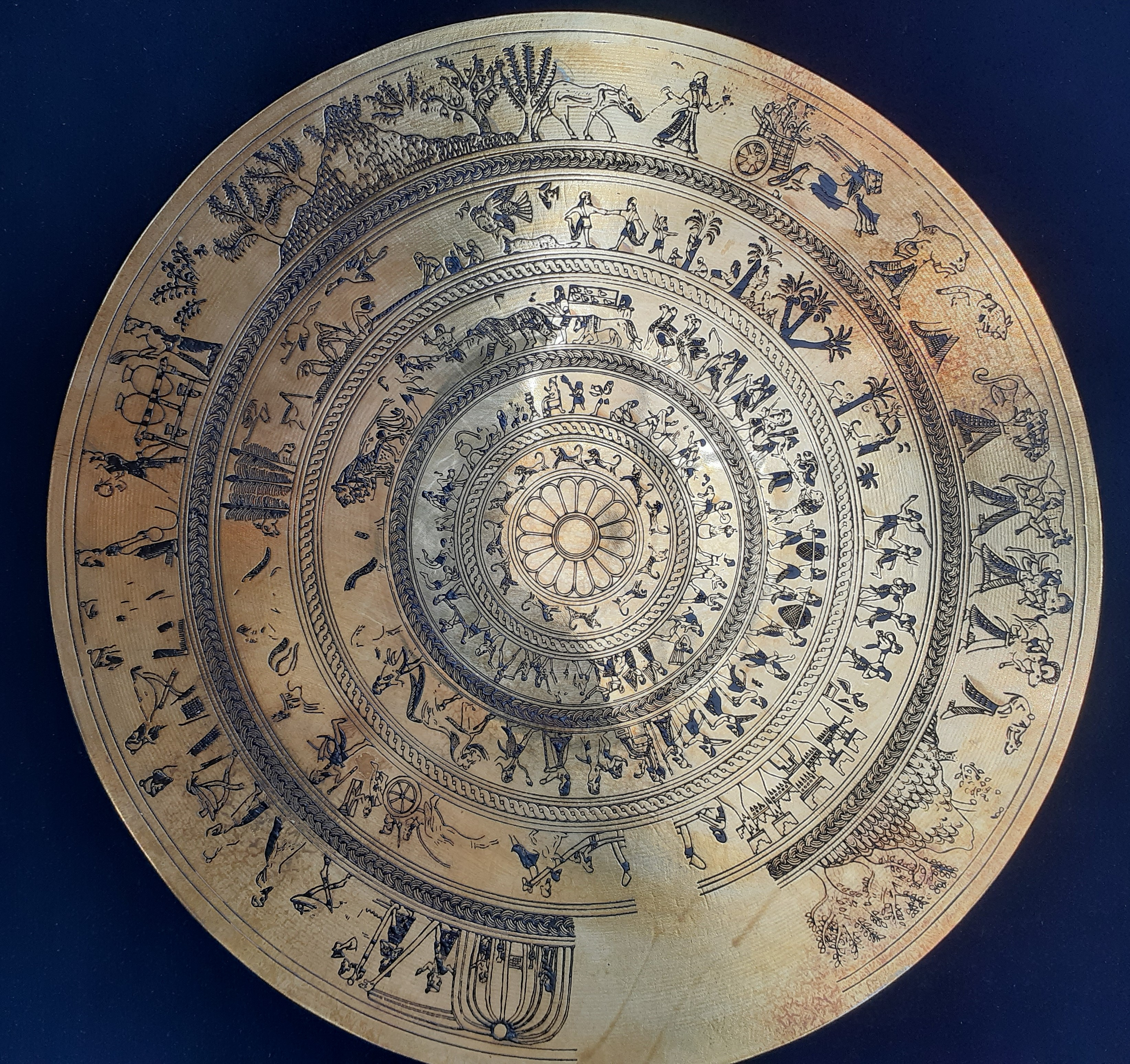
A replica of Arjan bowl

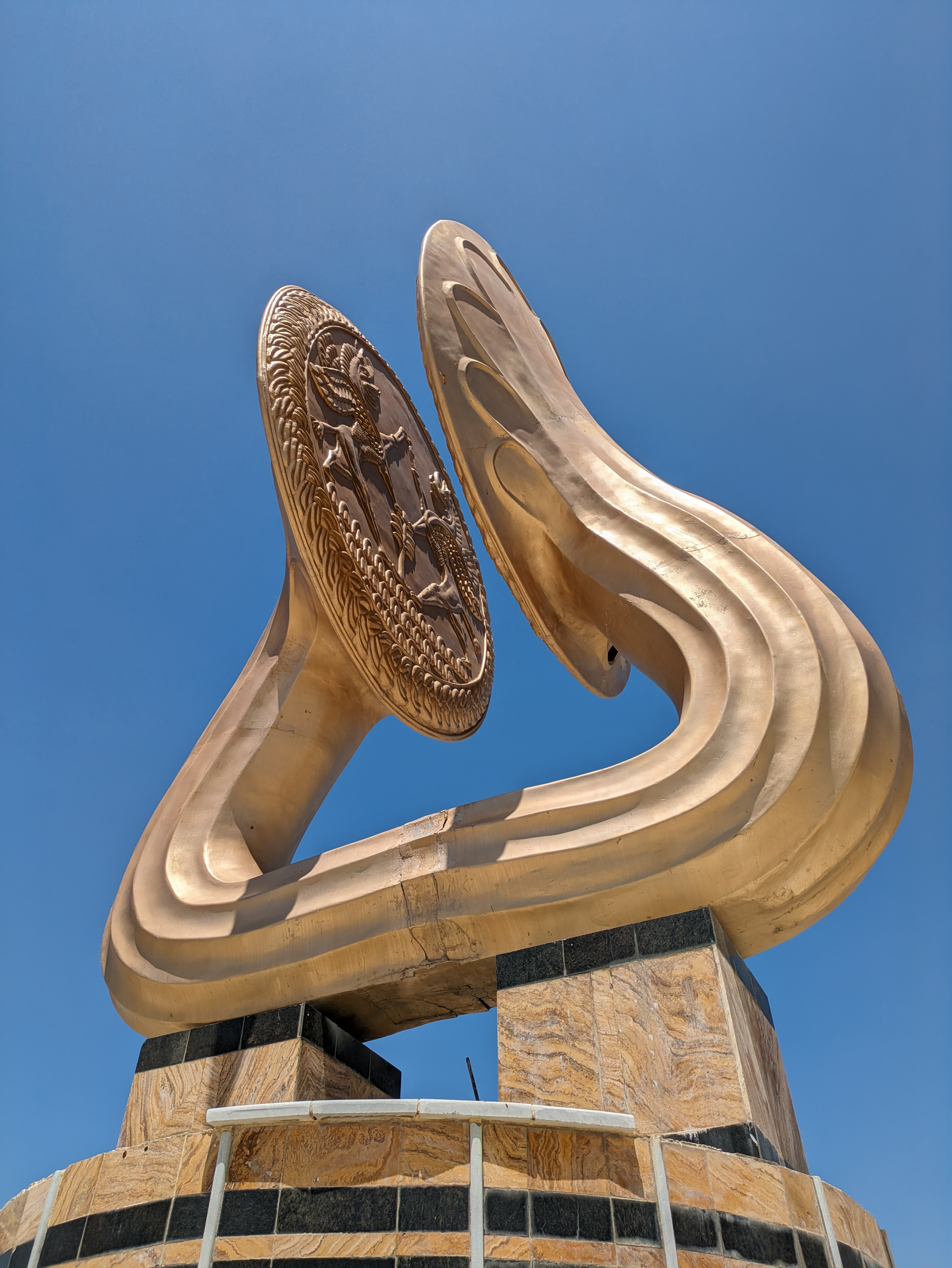
Ring of Power Statue, Symbol of Ancient Behbahan (Arjan Square)

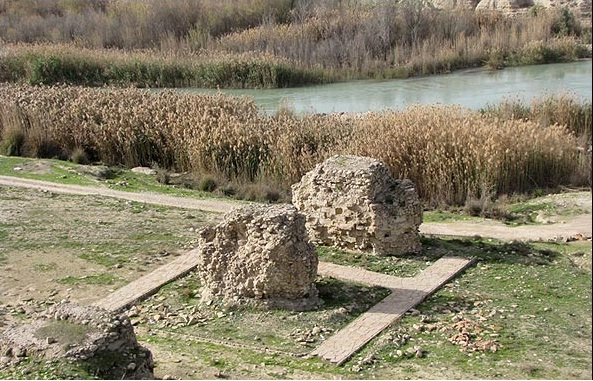
Ruins of Arjan Briges on Marun River in Northern Behbahan

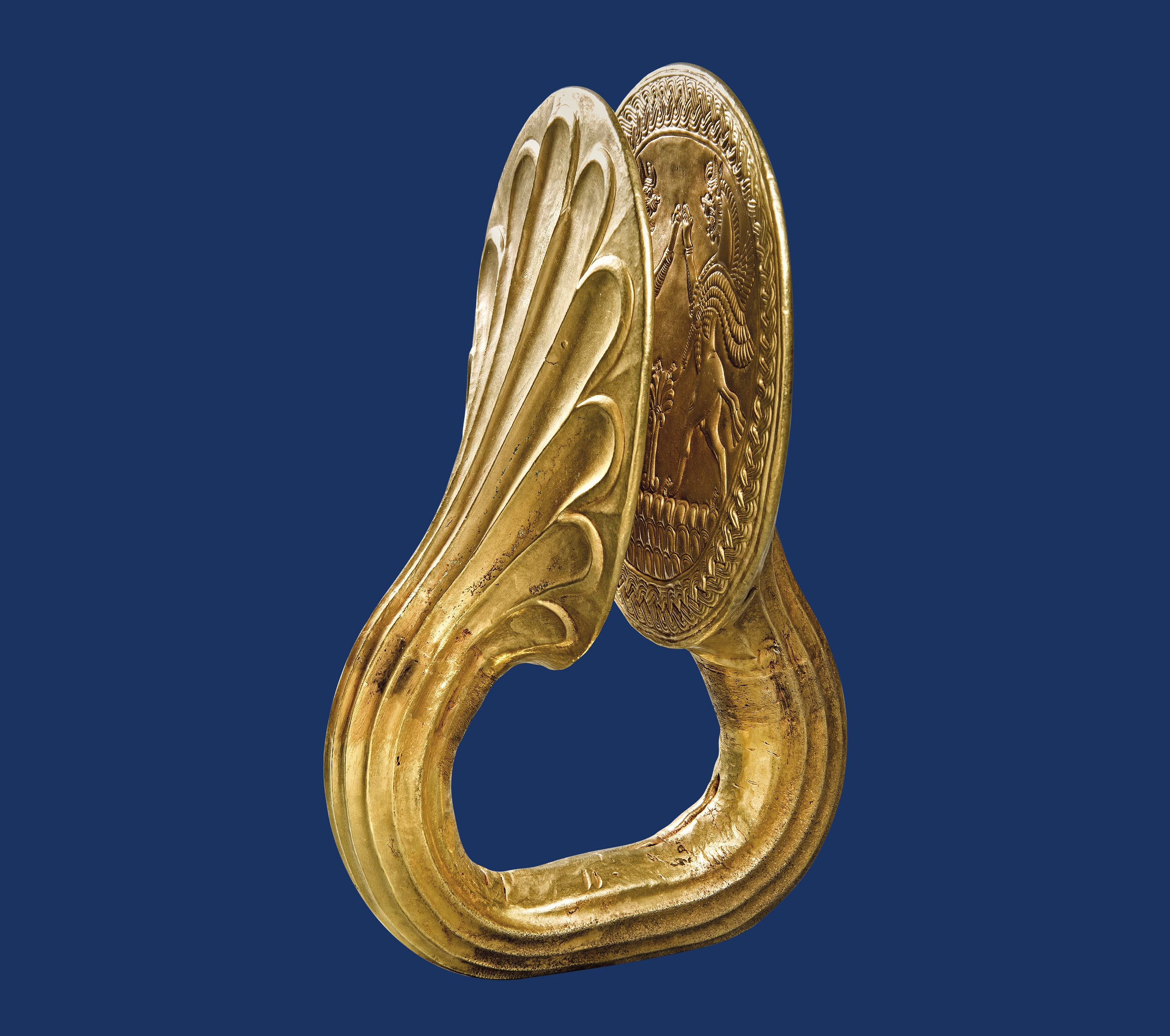
Arjan Ring of Power from Elamite king Kidin-Hutran

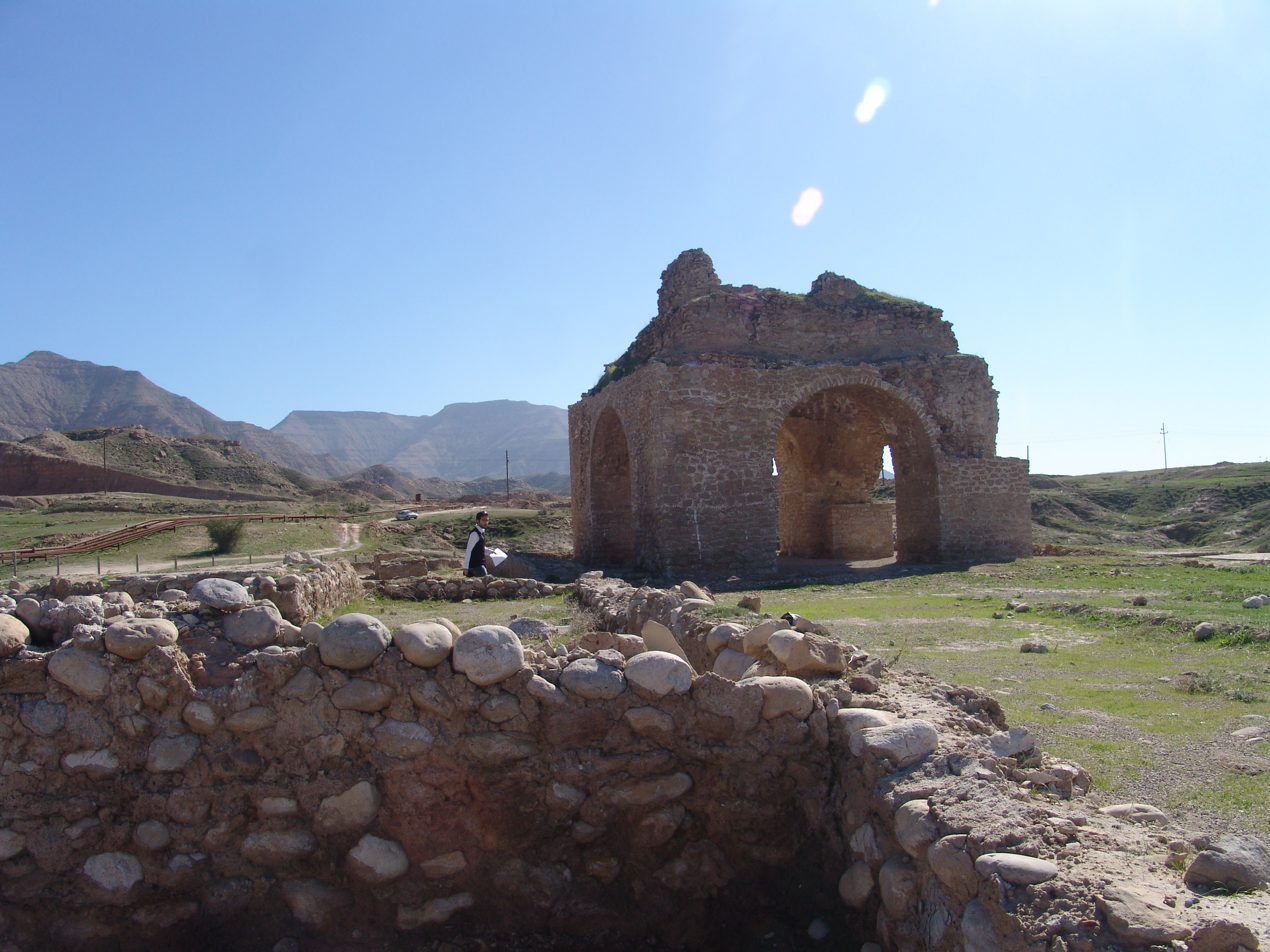
Arjan Zoroasterian Fire-Temple from Sassanid Era

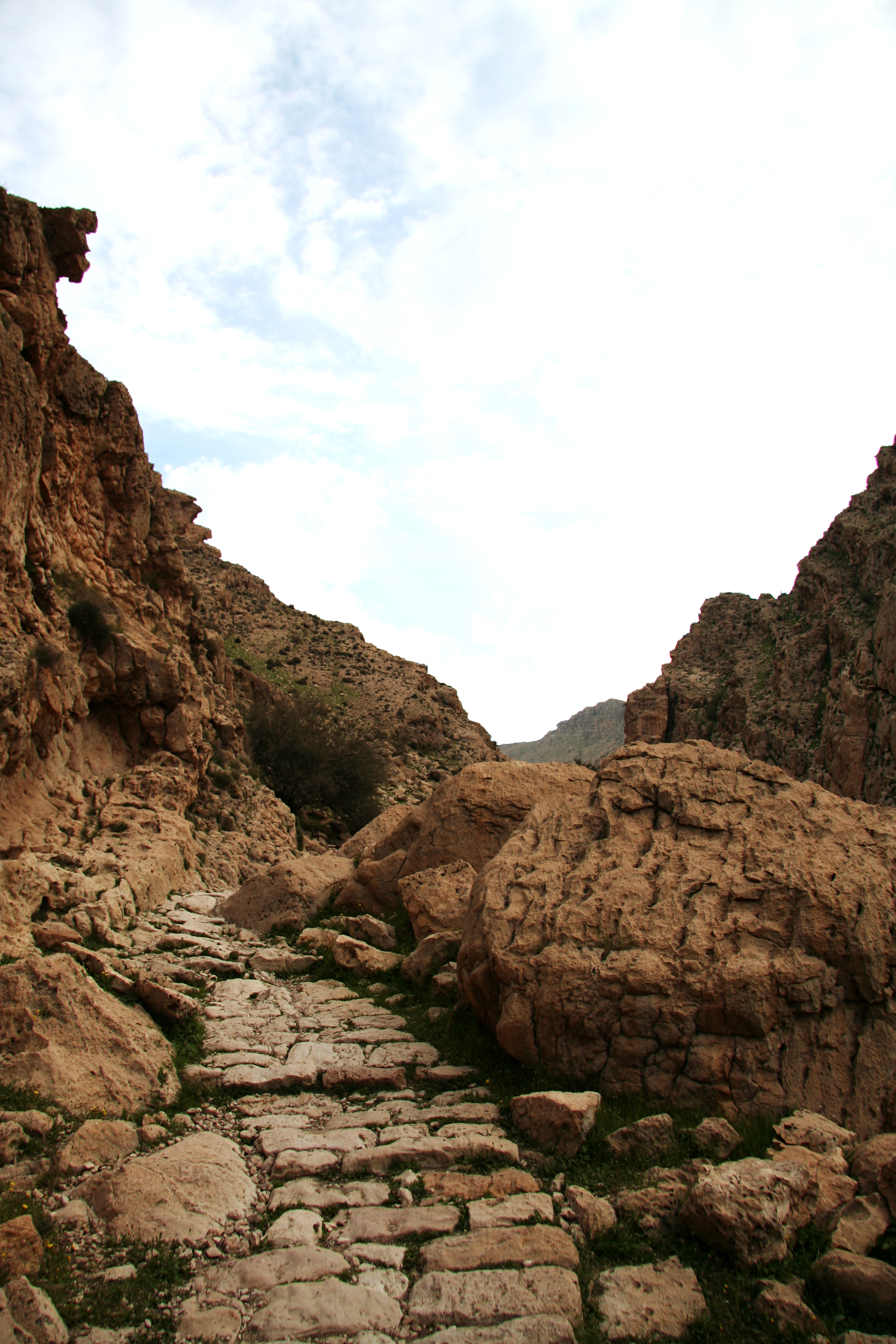
A stonepaved Achamenid Era road in Zagros Mountain Range, Behbahan

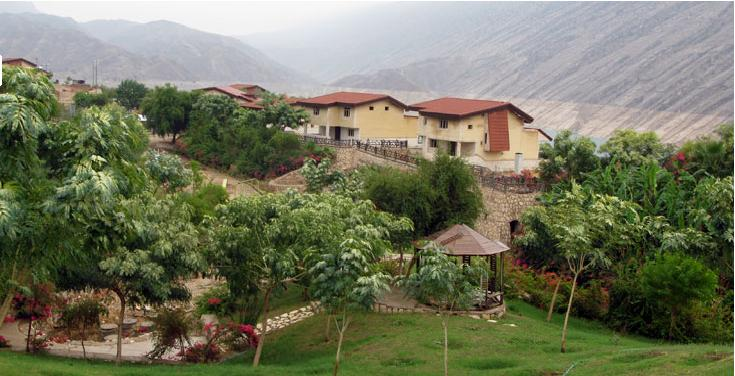
Marun Dam Public Resort

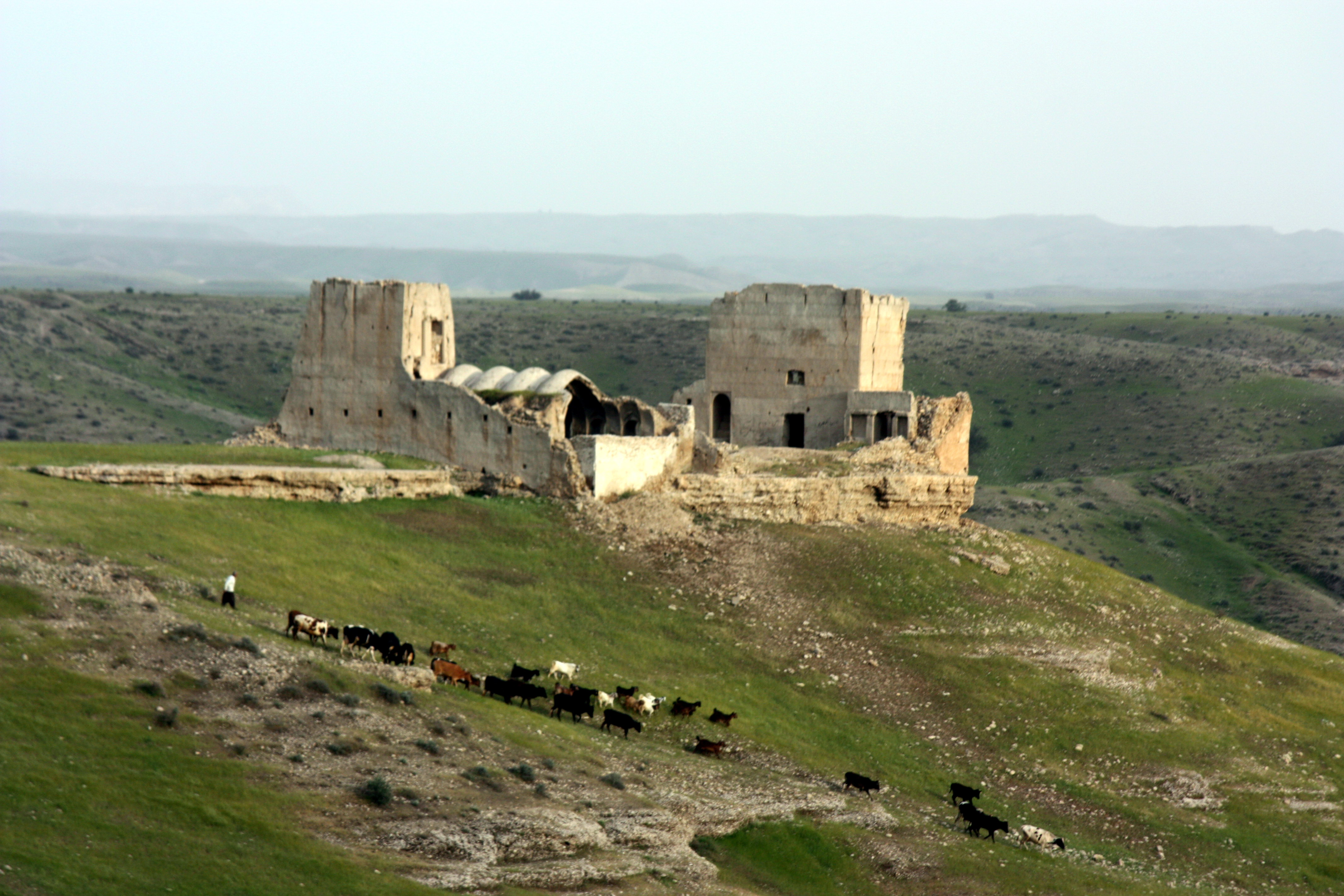
An outpost from Sassanid Era near Borj village, Behbahan

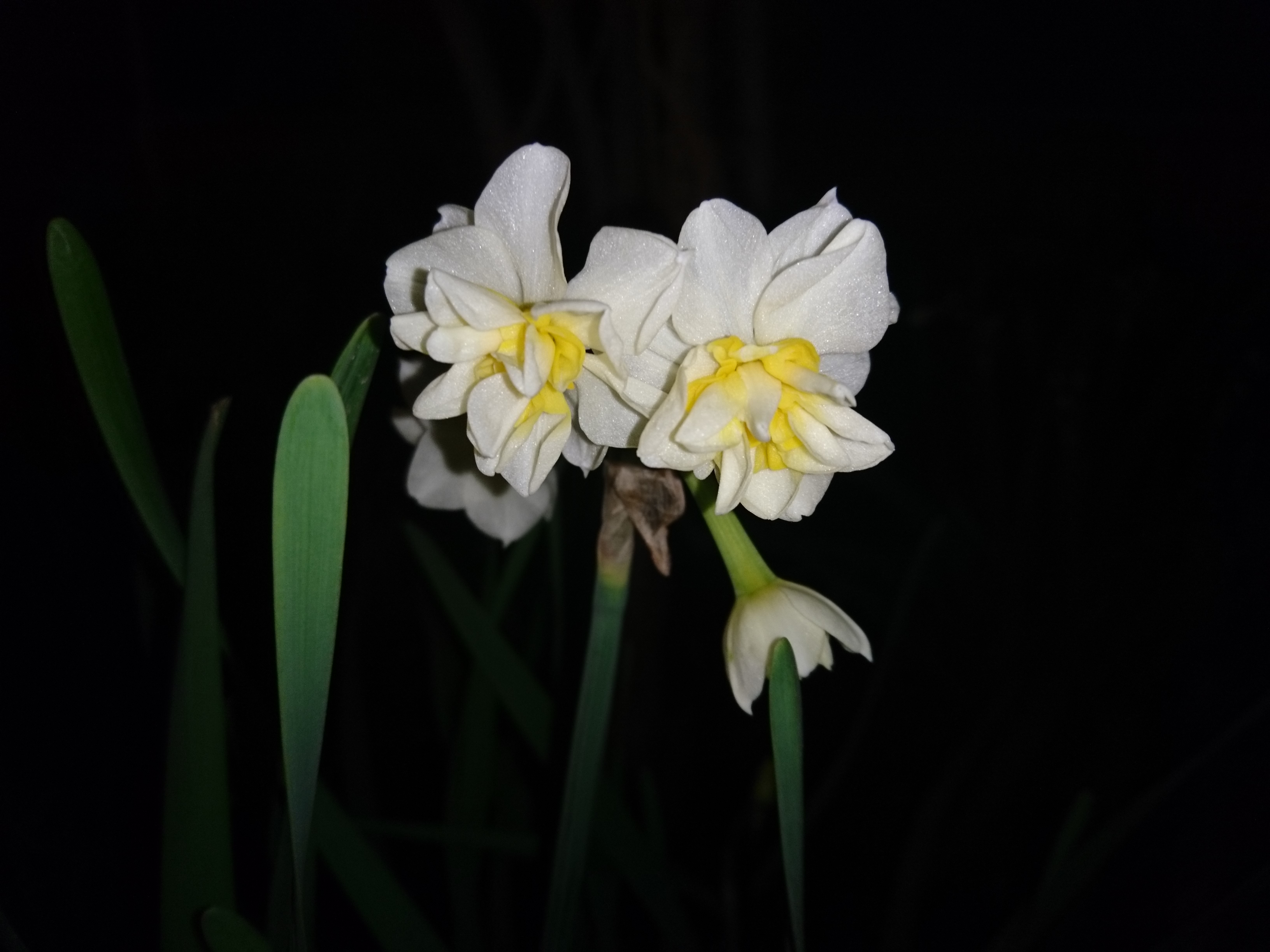
Main souvenir of Behbahan, daffodils

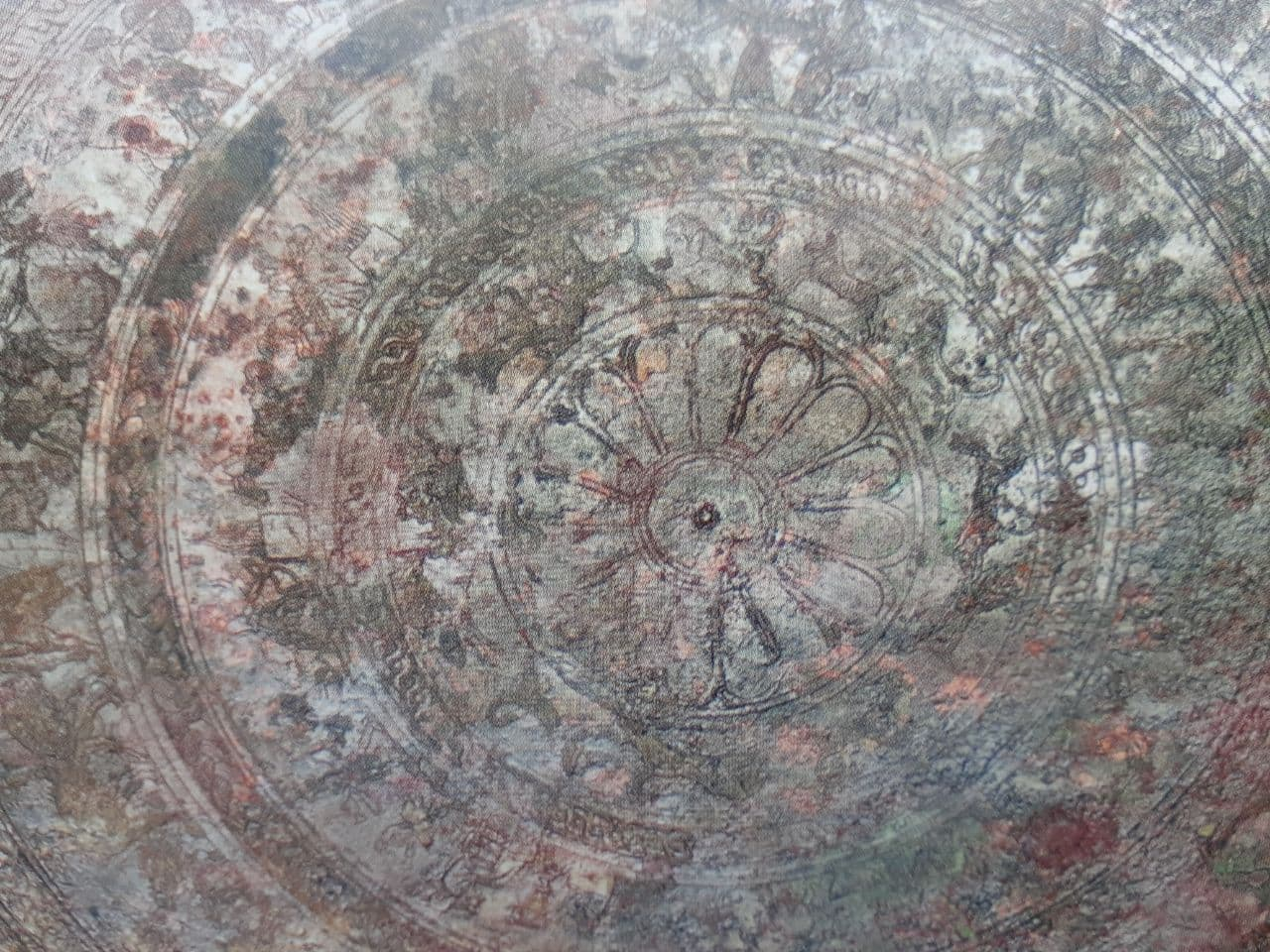
Bowl of Arjan

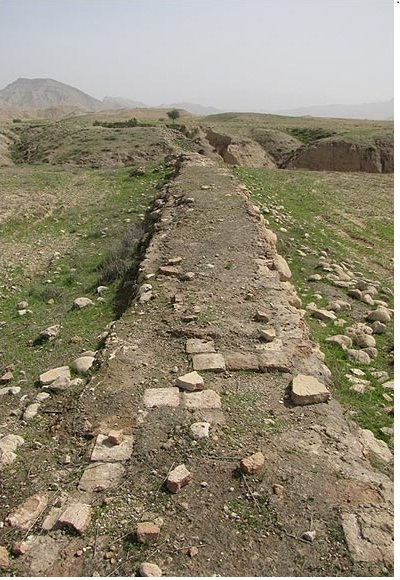
Ruins of Arjan town walls in northern Behbahan

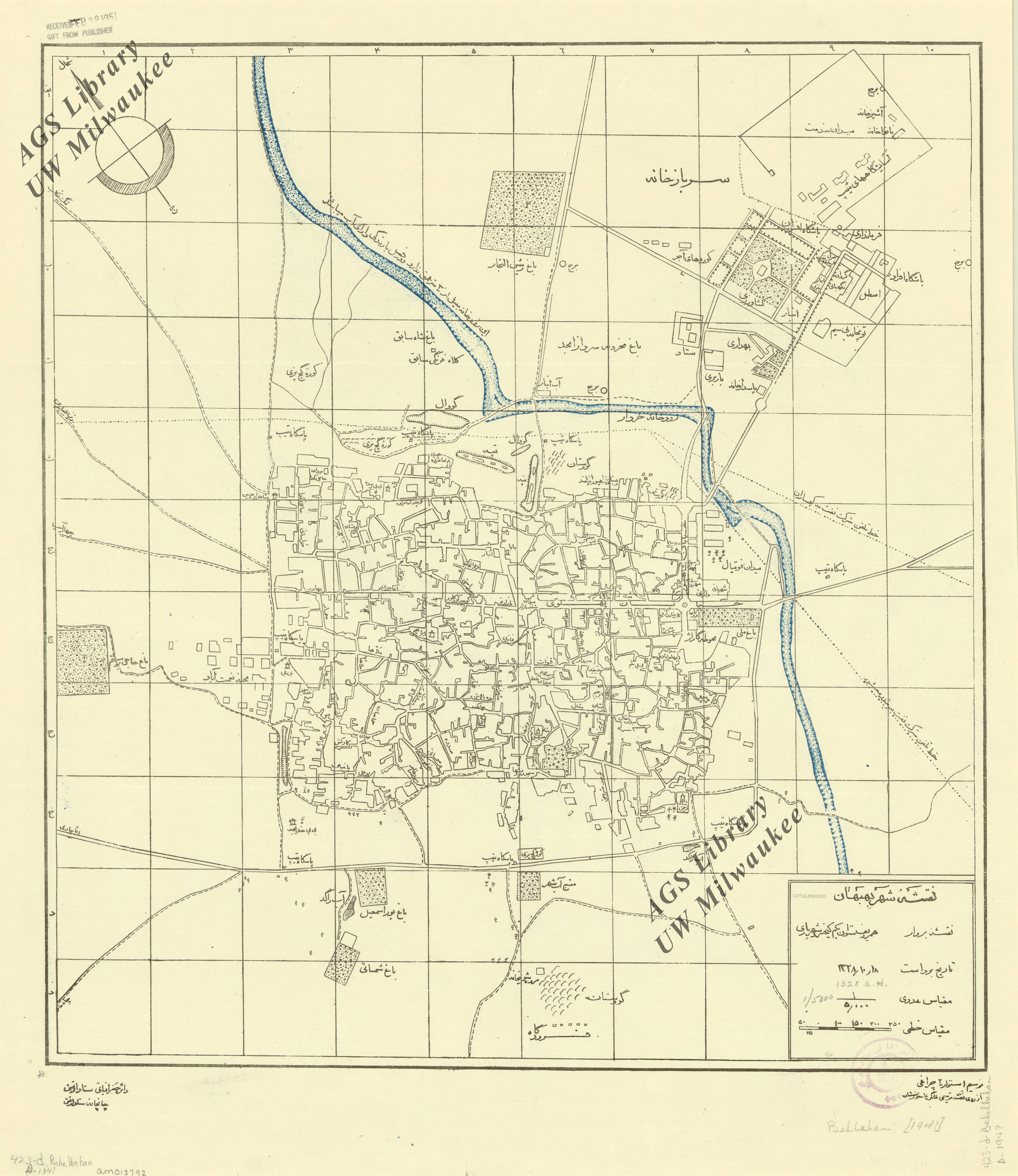
1950s map of Behbahan

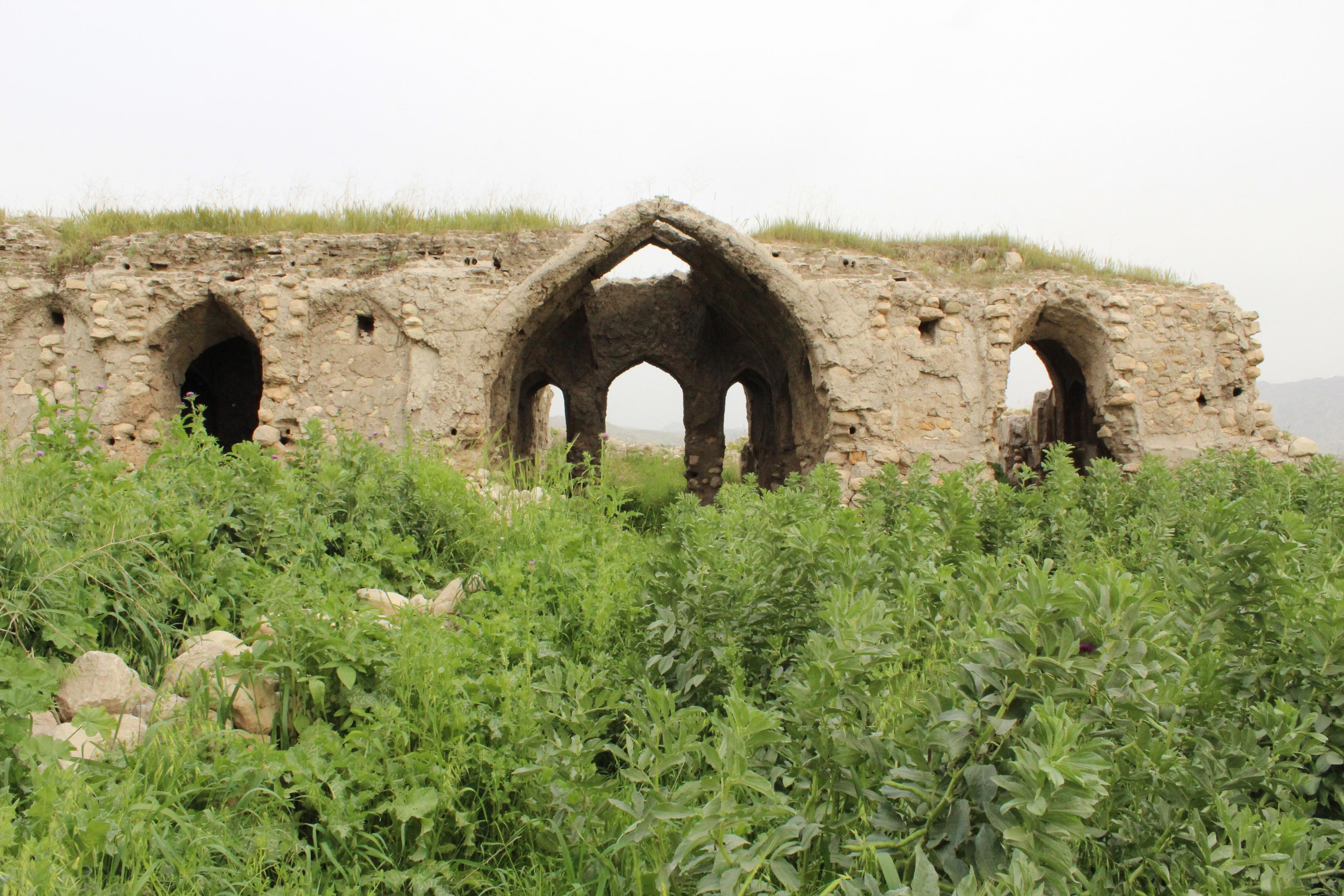
Ruins of a Nestorian church in Tashan village, Behbahan

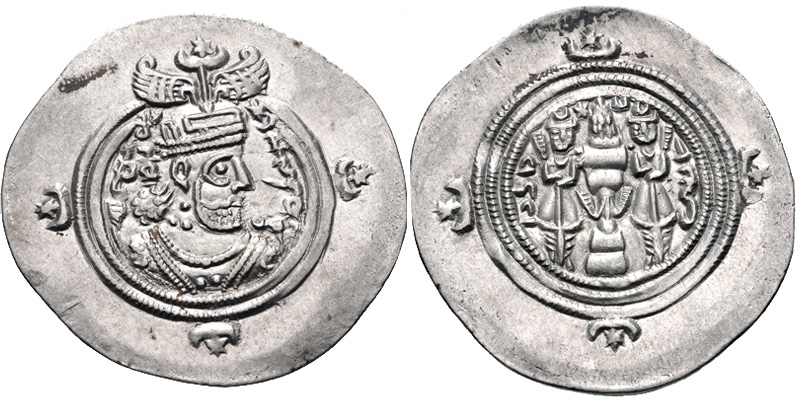
Coin of either Hormizd V or Hormizd VI, minted in Veh-az-Amid-Kavād (present-day Behbahan)

== Climate ==
Behbahan has a hot semi-arid climate (Köppen: BSh), characterised by sweltering and rainless summers and pleasant winters with occasional heavy rainfall.

Climate data for Behbahan (1993-2010)
Month	Jan	Feb	Mar	Apr	May	Jun	Jul	Aug	Sep	Oct	Nov	Dec	Year
Mean daily maximum °C (°F)	17.4 (63.3)	20.4 (68.7)	25.2 (77.4)	31.6 (88.9)	39.0 (102.2)	43.7 (110.7)	44.8 (112.6)	44.8 (112.6)	41.0 (105.8)	35.4 (95.7)	26.1 (79.0)	20.1 (68.2)	32.5 (90.4)
Daily mean °C (°F)	12.0 (53.6)	14.1 (57.4)	18.0 (64.4)	23.9 (75.0)	30.5 (86.9)	34.7 (94.5)	36.6 (97.9)	36.2 (97.2)	31.9 (89.4)	26.7 (80.1)	18.9 (66.0)	13.9 (57.0)	24.8 (76.6)
Mean daily minimum °C (°F)	6.7 (44.1)	7.9 (46.2)	10.8 (51.4)	16.3 (61.3)	22.0 (71.6)	25.7 (78.3)	28.5 (83.3)	27.6 (81.7)	22.7 (72.9)	17.9 (64.2)	11.7 (53.1)	7.8 (46.0)	17.1 (62.8)
Average precipitation mm (inches)	83.6 (3.29)	33.5 (1.32)	48.4 (1.91)	20.1 (0.79)	3.7 (0.15)	0.8 (0.03)	0.0 (0.0)	0.4 (0.02)	0.2 (0.01)	3.0 (0.12)	42.0 (1.65)	81.6 (3.21)	317.3 (12.5)
Average relative humidity (%)	75	64	52	41	23	17	20	25	26	33	52	70	42
Mean monthly sunshine hours	186.0	197.5	232.9	240.1	312.3	348.4	335.9	336.3	309.4	283.7	218.3	187.4	3,188.2
Source: Iran Meteorological Organization(temperatures), (precipitation), (sun), (humidity)

== See also ==
- Arjan bowl
- Arrajan
