= Marun Dam =

Dam in Khuzestan, Iran

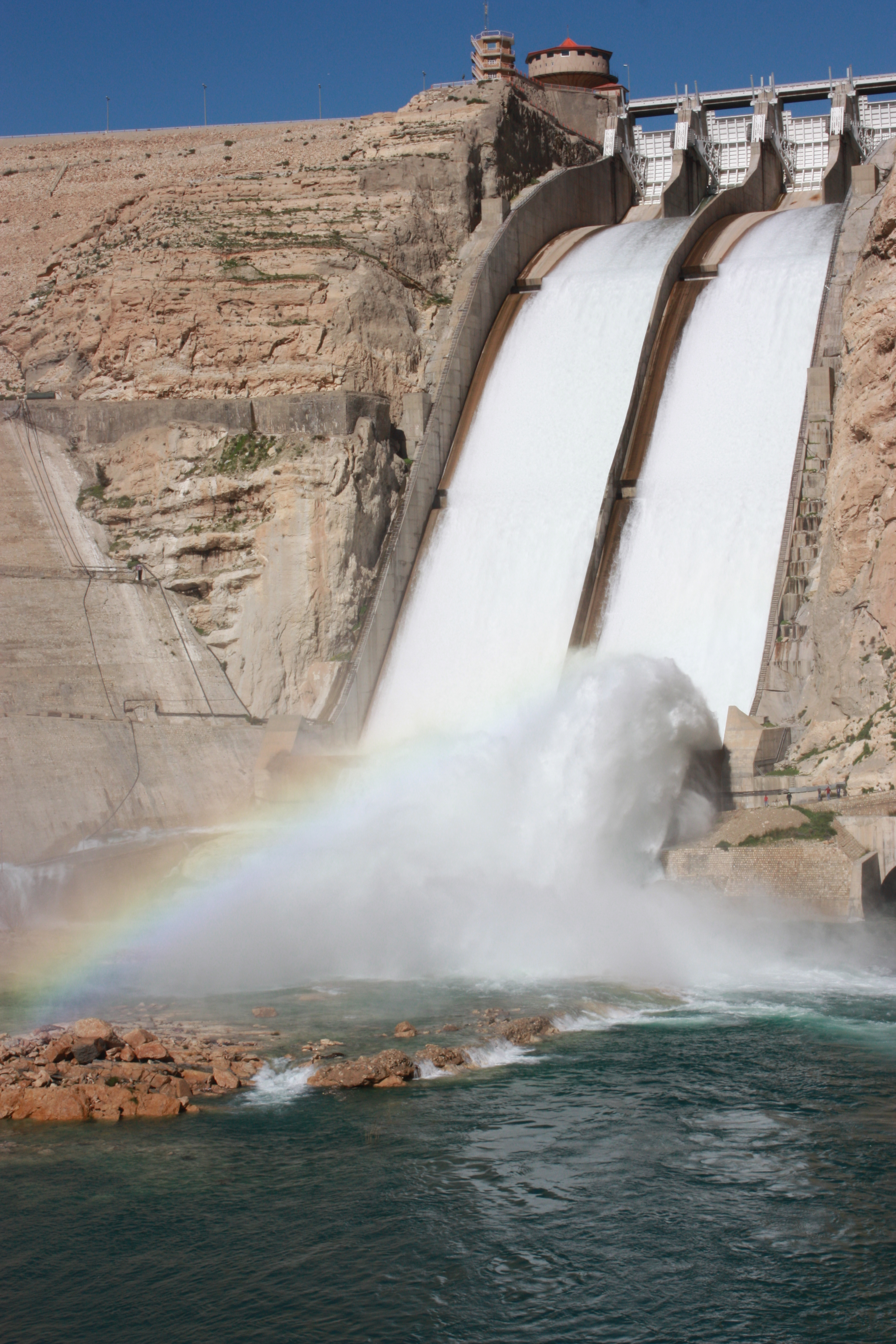
- A view of rainbow in the spillway of Marun Dam

- Location within Iran
- Interactive map of Marun Dam
- Country: Iran
- Location: Behbahan in Behbahan County, Khuzestan province
- Coordinates: 30°42′36″N 50°21′54″E
- Purpose: Power, Irrigation
- Status: Operational
- Construction began: 1989
- Opening date: 1998; 28 years ago
- Owners: Khuzestan Water & Power Authority

Dam and spillways
- Type of dam: Embankment dam, rock-fill
- Impounds: Marun River
- Height: 151 m (495 ft)
- Height (foundation): 165 m (541 ft)
- Length: 345 m (1,132 ft)
- Width (crest): 15 m (49 ft)
- Width (base): 110 m (360 ft)
- Dam volume: 9,000,000 m^{3} (12,000,000 cu yd)

Reservoir
- Total capacity: 1,200,000,000 m^{3} (970,000 acre⋅ft)
- Active capacity: 1,000,000,000 m^{3} (810,000 acre⋅ft)
- Surface area: 25 km^{2} (9.7 mi^{2})

Power Station
- Commission date: 2004
- Type: Conventional
- Turbines: 2 x 75 MW Francis-type
- Installed capacity: 150 MW

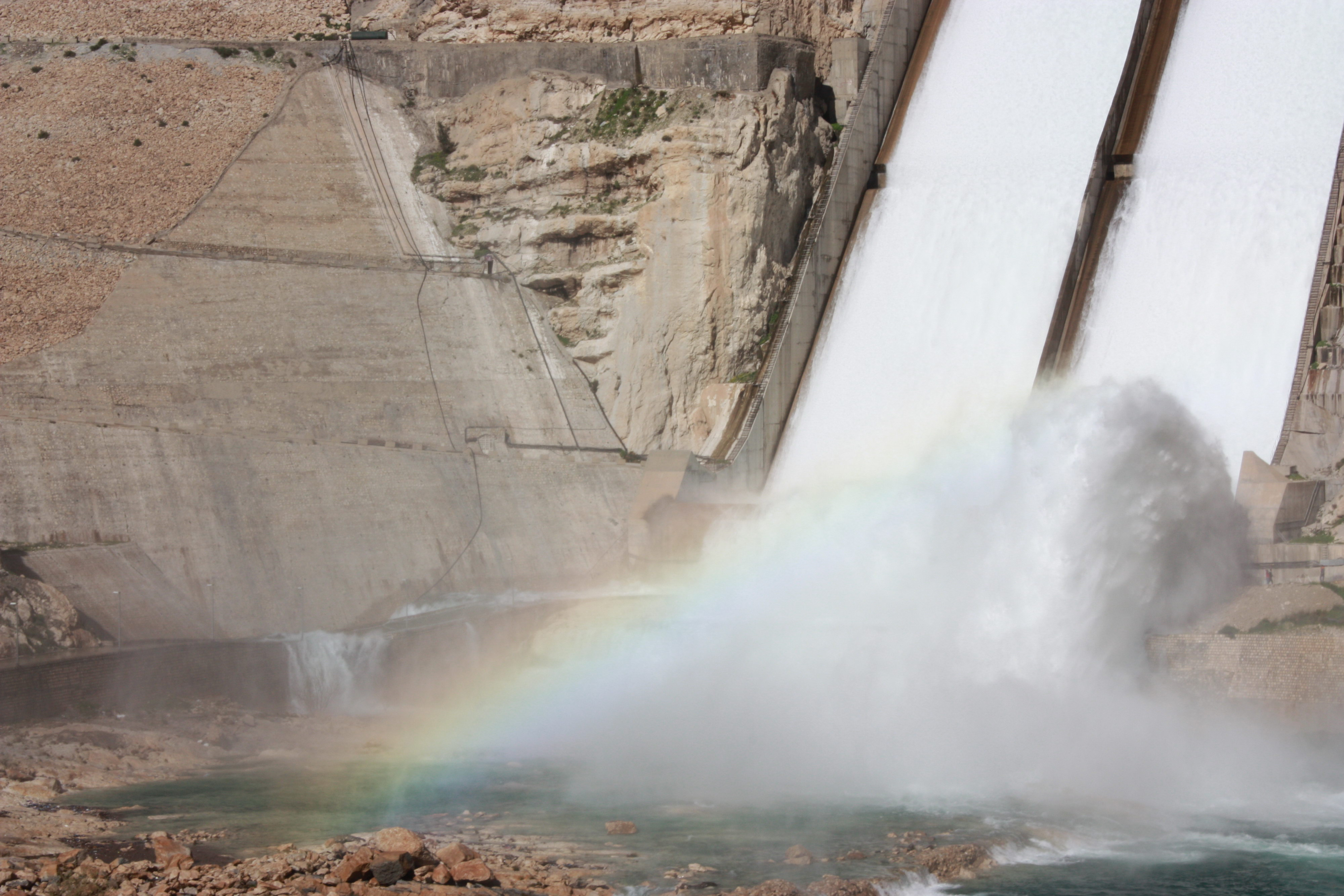
Marun Dam, Behbahan

Marun Dam (Persian: سد مارون), also spelled Maroun, is a rock-fill embankment dam on the Marun River about 15 km (9.3 mi) north of Behbahan in Behbahan County, Khuzestan province, Iran. The dam serves to provide water for irrigation and to generate hydroelectric power as well. Construction on the dam began in 1989 and it was completed in 1998. A smaller Marun-II regulator dam is planned downstream. The 150 MW power station was commissioned in 2004.

== Marun dam lake facilities ==
Marun Dam Lake is one of Behbahan's attractions. A sports recreation complex with a beach, an area of about 13 hectares, a beautiful green space and various plant species, has been established next to Marun Dam Lake.

== See also ==
- List of power stations in Iran
- Shadegan Ponds
- Dams in Iran
