= Kidin-Hutran =

King of the Igihalkid Dynasty

Kidin-Hutran was a middle-Elamite king of the Igihalkid dynasty known for his wars with Babylonia. The Babylonian Chronicle P describes two Kidin-Hutran attacks (iv 14-22). In his first raid, he crossed the Tigris, sacked Der and Nippur and deposed the Babylonian king, Enlil-nadin-shumi (almost certainly an Assyrian puppet). Later on, during the reign of Adad-shuma-iddina, he attacked Babylonia again, striking Marad and Isin

Kidin-Hutran is also mentioned in the so-called Berlin letter (Pergamon Museum, VAT17020), a neo-Babylonian copy of a letter sent by an unnamed Elamite king to the Babylonian court, stating his right to the Babylonian throne. The letter states that Kidin-Hurtan was a son of the king Untash-Napirisha and a grandson of the Babylonian king Burna-Buriash.

Since more than 100 years distance separate the end of Burna-Buriash's reign and the accession of Adad-shuma-iddina, some authors assume that there was more than one king with this name.

== See also ==
- Jam Arjan
