= Marun River =

River in Iran

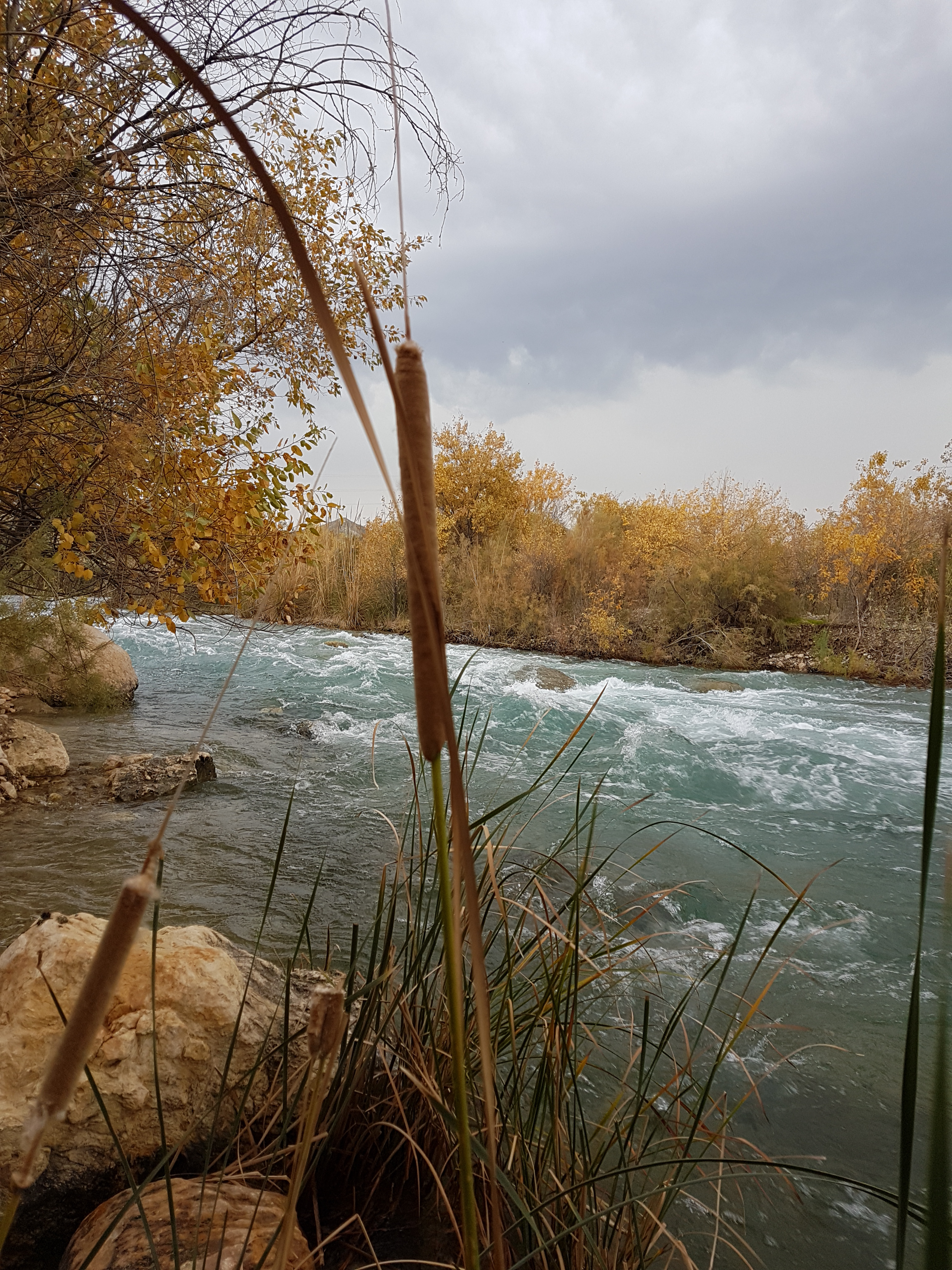
Marun River, Behbahan

The Marun River (Persian: رودخانه مارون) originates in the Zagros Mountains in Kohgiluyeh and Boyer-Ahmad province passes through Khuzestan province and finally flows into the Shadegan Ponds under the name of Jarahi River. The name is also spelled as "Maroun." The river is interrupted by the Marun Dam in Behbahan.

The Marun is a tributary of Karun River.
