= Ardashir-Khwarrah =

Administrative division of the Sasanian province of Pars

Ardashir-Khwarrah Arđaxšēr-Xwarra
- Administrative division of Sasanian Pars
- ca. 224 – 651
- Map of Sasanian Pars
- Capital: Gor
- Historical era: Late Antiquity
  - Established: 224
  - Muslim conquest: 651
Preceded by	Succeeded by
Parthian Empire	Rashidun Caliphate
- Today part of: Bahrain; Iran; Kuwait; Qatar; United Arab Emirates

Ardashir-Khwarrah (Middle Persian: Arđaxšēr-Xwarra, meaning "glory of Ardashir") was one of the four (later five) administrative divisions of the Sasanian province of Pars. The other administrative divisions were Shapur-Khwarrah, Istakhr and Darabgerd, while a fifth named Arrajan was founded in the early 6th century by Kavadh I (r. 498–531).

== History ==
Ardashir-Khwarrah was founded by the first Sasanian king Ardashir I (r. 224-242), who around the same time also founded its capital, Gor. Although some sources state that the capital was established after Ardashir's victory in 244 over the Parthian king Artabanus V, archeological evidence confirm that it was established before the battle. In Gor, Ardashir I built a Zoroastrian tower called Terbal, which was similar to a Buddhist stupa. Furthermore, he also built a fire-temple which the 10th-century Arab historian al-Masudi reportedly visited.

In the early 5th-century, a bridge was built in Gor by the Sasanian minister (wuzurg framadār) Mihr Narseh, who was a native of Abruwan, a subdistrict in Ardashir-Khwarrah. An inscription was also written on the bridge, which says; "This bridge was built by order of Mihr-Narseh, wuzurg framadār, for his soul's sake and at his own expense... Whoever has come on this road let him give a blessing to Mihr-Narseh and his sons for that he thus bridged this crossing." Furthermore, he also founded four villages with a fire-temple in each of them. The name of the fire-temples were; Faraz-mara-awar-khwadaya, Zurwandadan, Kardadan, and Mahgushnaspan. He had a fifth fire-temple constructed in Abruwan, which may have been the Barin fire-temple that the 10th-century Persian geographer Estakhri visited, who stated that the fire-temple had an inscription that stated 30,000 dirhams was spent for its construction. Sometime before 540, a diocese was established in Gor.

In ca. 644, during the Arab invasion of Iran, one of Ardashir-Khwarrah's subdistricts, Tawwaz, was seized by al-'Ala' ibn al-Hadrami, who thereafter sent Hormoz ibn Hayyan al-'Abdi to capture Siniz, which he successfully managed to. In 649/50, Abd-Allah ibn Amir made an unsuccessful attempt to capture Gor. In 650/1, the last Sasanian king Yazdegerd III (r. 632–651) went to Gor to plan an organized resistance against the Arabs, but after receiving the news of Istakhr's fall, fled to Kirman. The Arabs then quickly seized Gor, Siraf, and the rest of Pars.

== Subdistricts ==
The subdistricts of Ardashir-Khwarrah were;

- Abarkavan Island
- Abarsas
- Abruwan
- Alar
- Alavad
- Gor
- Bahrain
- Bayza
- Bokht-Ardashir
- Dih
- Gowaym
- Irahestan
- Karzin
- Khabr
- Khorram-Ardashir
- Khunapakan
- Kovar
- Kujaran-Ardashir
- Shiraz
- Siniz
- Siraf
- Sotuj
- Tawwaz

== Notables from Ardashir-Khwarrah ==
- Aspad Gushnasp
- Farrukhmard
- Mihr Narseh
- Sukhra
- Shapur I
- Zurwandad

== Sources ==
- Bosworth, C. E. (1986). "ARDAŠĪR-ḴORRA". Encyclopaedia Iranica, Vol. II, Fasc. 4. pp. 384–385.
- Daryaee, Touraj (2012). "MEHR-NARSEH". Encyclopaedia Iranica.
- Huff, Dietrich (1999). "FĪRŪZĀBĀD". Encyclopaedia Iranica, Vol. IX, Fasc. 6. pp. 633–636.
- Miri, Negin (2009). "Historical Geography of Fars during the Sasanian Period" (PDF). Sasanika. University of Sydney. pp. 1–65. Archived from the original (PDF) on 2016-04-04.
- Morony, M. (1986). "ʿARAB ii. Arab conquest of Iran". Encyclopaedia Iranica, Vol. II, Fasc. 2. pp. 203–210.
- Perikhanian, A. (1983). "Iranian Society and Law". The Cambridge History of Iran: The Seleucid, Parthian, and Sasanian periods (2). Cambridge: Cambridge University Press. pp. 627–681. ISBN 978-0-521-24693-4.
