= Bushehr =

City in Bushehr province, Iran

Bushehr Persian: بوشهر
- City
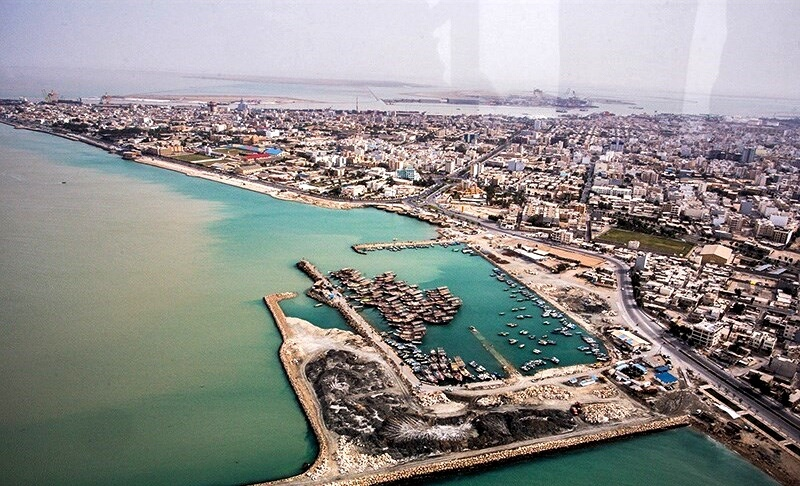
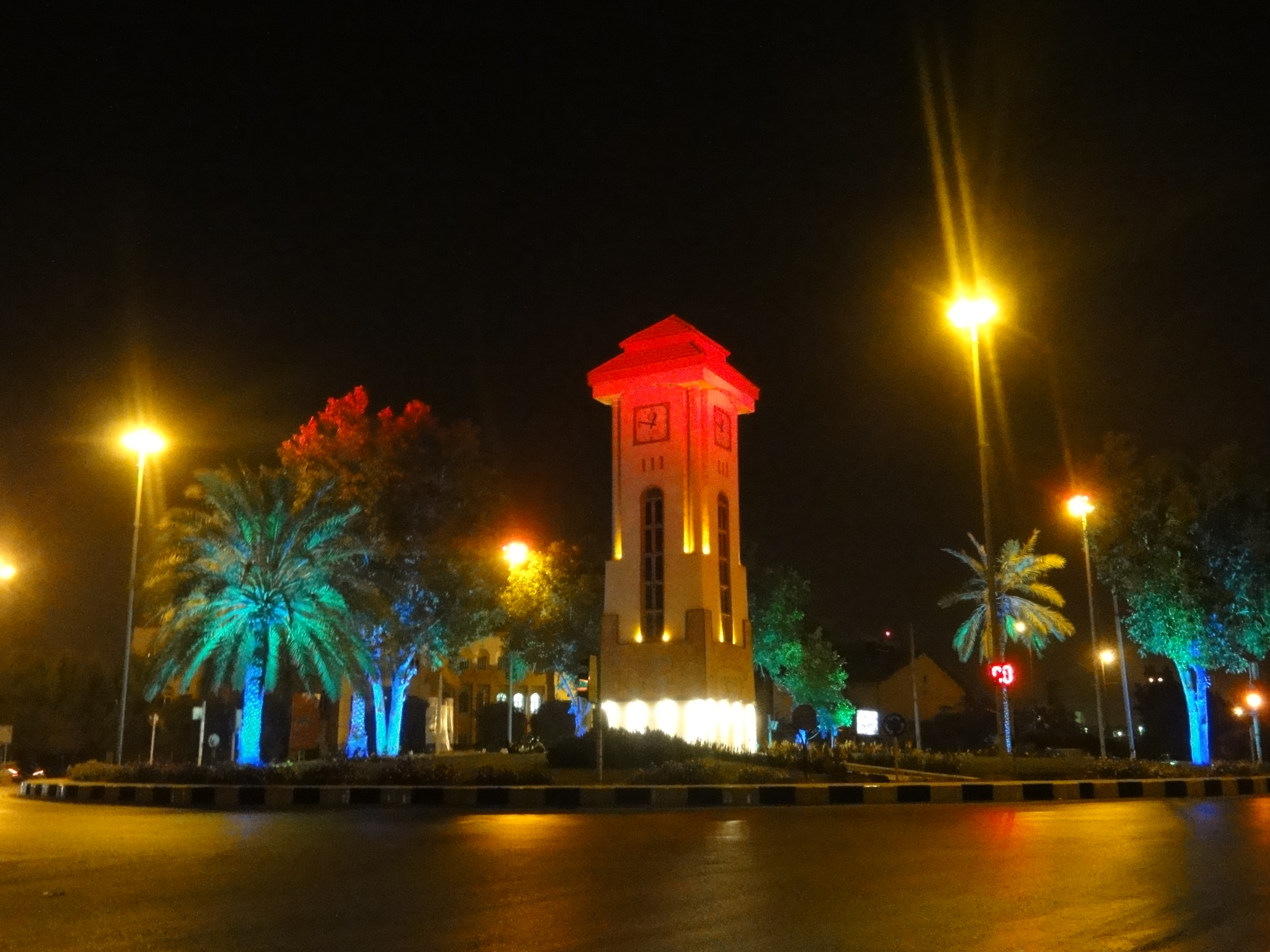
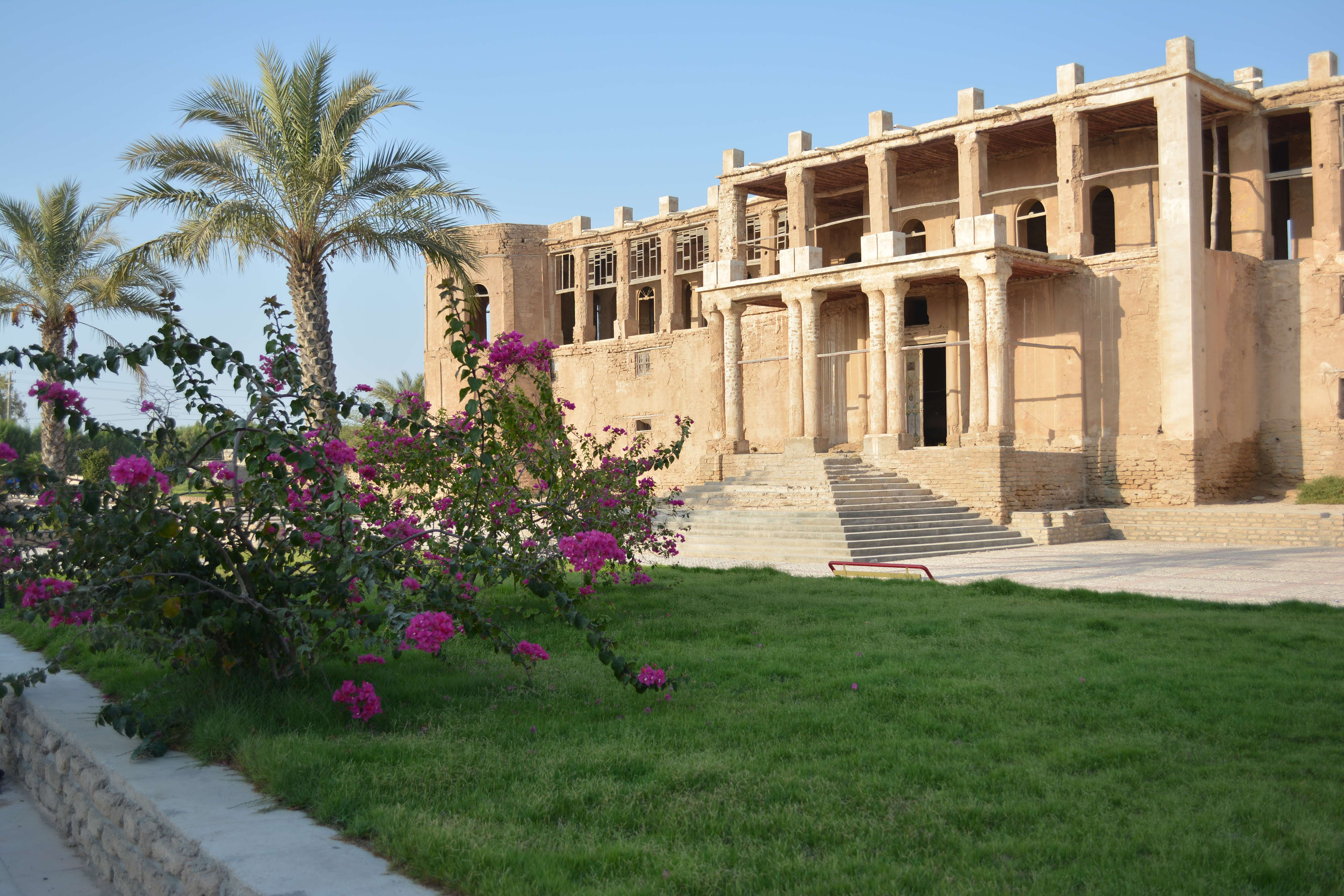
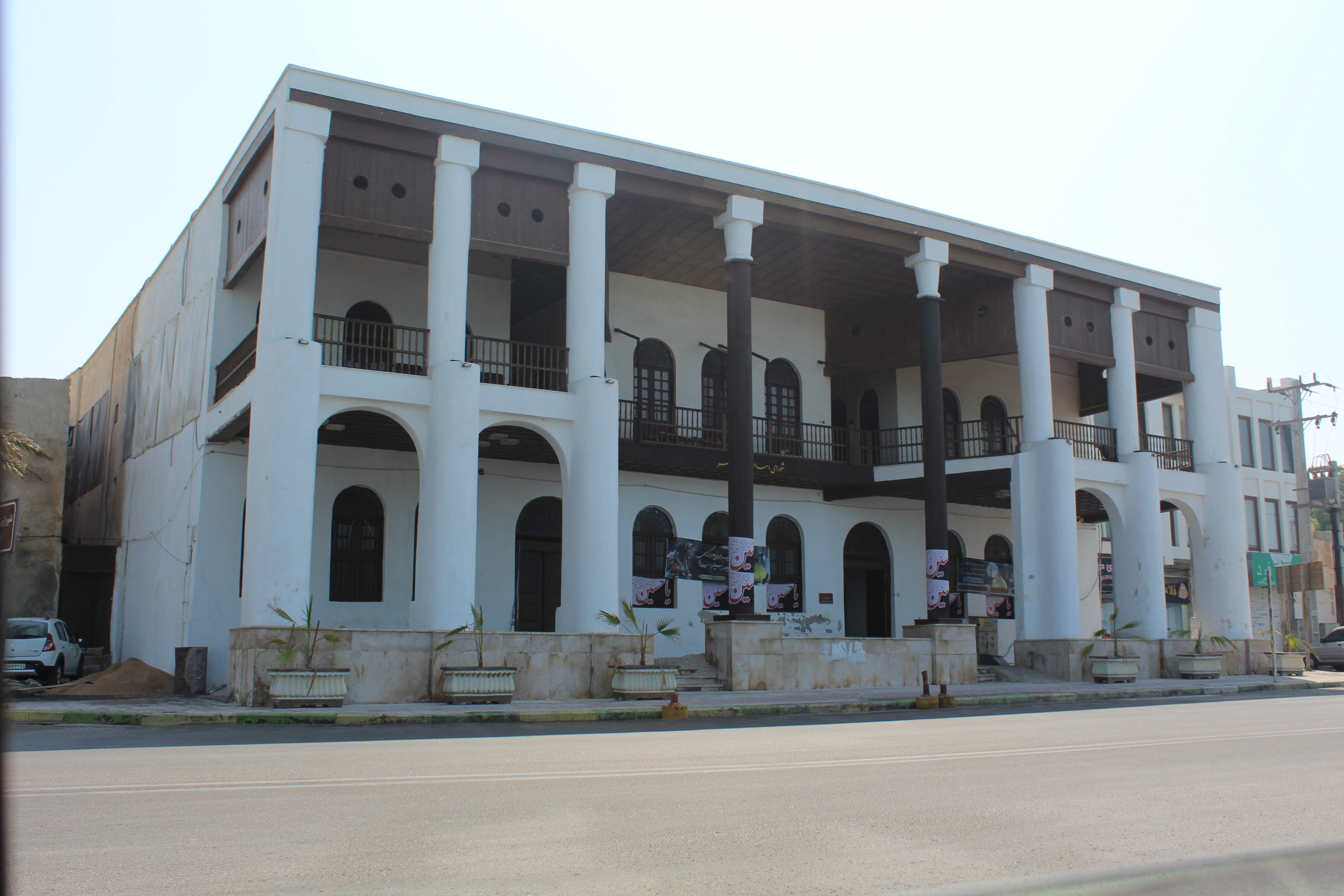
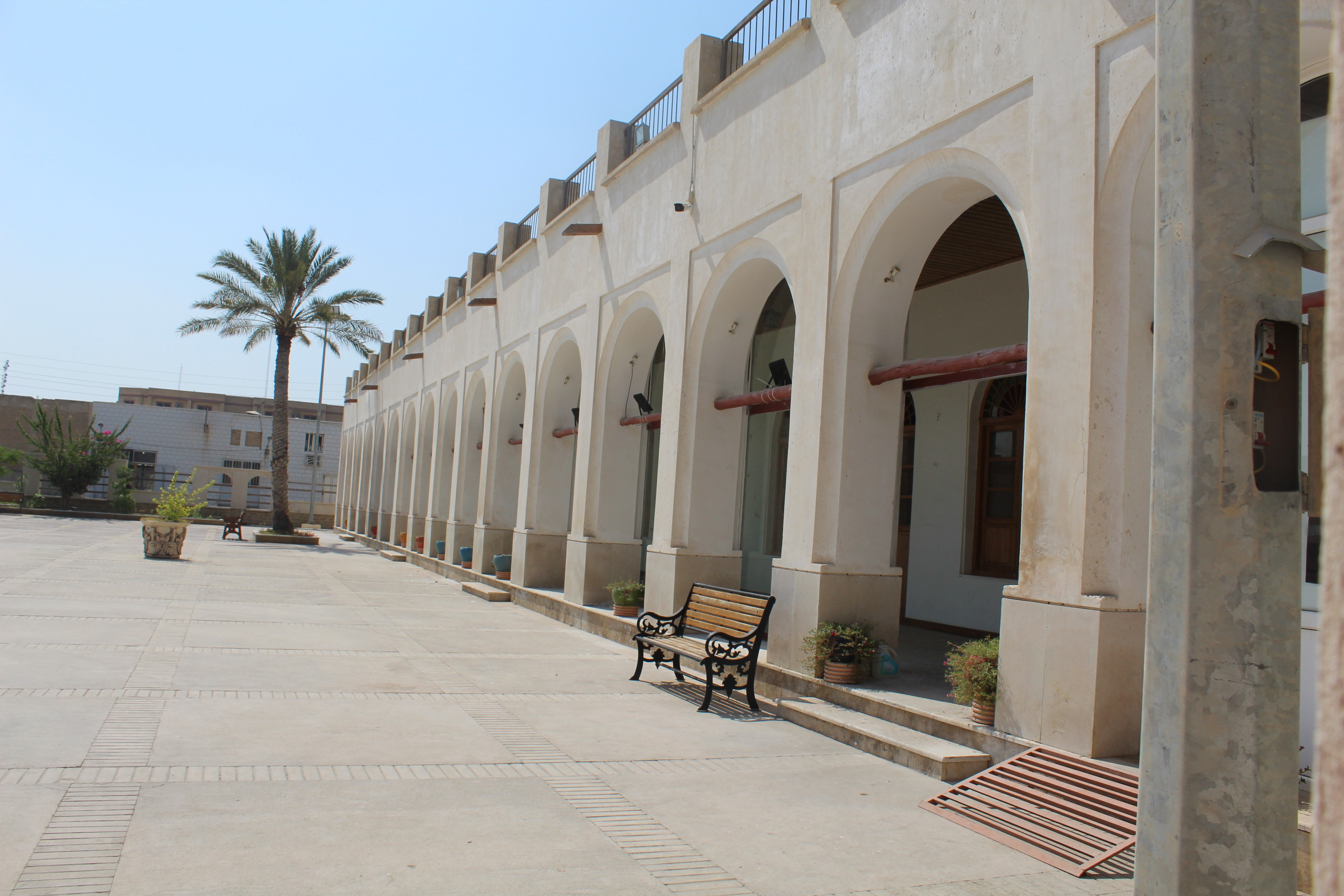
- Panoramic, Clock tower at night, Malek Palace, Amiriya Mansion, Saadat school
- Map of the Bushehr
- Location within Iran Location within Persian Gulf Location within Asia
- Coordinates: 28°55′35″N 50°51′05″E
- Country: Iran
- Province: Bushehr
- County: Bushehr
- District: Central

Government
  - Mayor: Hossein Heydari
- Elevation: 18 m (59 ft)

Population (2016)
  - City: 223,504
  - Metro: 398,581
- Time zone: UTC+3:30 (IRST)
- Climate: BSh
- Website: www.bushehrcity.ir/en www.bushehrcity.ir

Bushehr (Persian: بوشهر; [buːˈʃe(h)ɾ]) (Note: Also romanized as Būshehr; also known as Abu Shehr, Abuschehr, Bandar Abu Shehr, Bouchehr, Buschir, Busehr, and Bushire; also Bandar Bushehr and Bandar-e-Bushehr (بندر بوشهر), also romanized as Bandar Būshehr and Bandar-e Būshehr) is a port city in the Central District of Bushehr County, Bushehr province, Iran. It is the capital of the province, the county and the district.

== Etymology ==
The roots of the name "Bushehr" are uncertain. It is unlikely that it is derived from Abū Šahr ("father of the city"), a theory which remains popular. It may be an abbreviation of Bokht-Ardashir ("Ardashir has given"), though this is not backed by conclusive evidence.. Scholars such as Zana Salehrad argue that the name Bushehr may come from an ancient Persian root, possibly "Būsh" meaning "fort" or "stronghold," combined with "Her" meaning "place" or "settlement." This theory suggests that Bushehr was originally recognized as a fortified coastal settlement, protecting trade routes along the Persian Gulf. Its strategic location and natural harbor made it an important center for commerce, defense, and maritime activity throughout history. In this sense, the name Bushehr reflects both the city's strength and its enduring connection to the sea and the people who relied on it for livelihood.

== History ==
=== Origins ===
Map of Bushehr, Persian Gulf, 1774, by Cap. David Simmons

A number of alleged premodern references to Bushehr, including the first made by an Arab geographer in 1225, have been disputed as perhaps alluding to the modern city of Reishahr, a harbor 10 km to the south, where archaeological evidence points to the presence of a much older settlement. Reishahr is also most likely equivalent to the town of Mesambria, a place the Greeks knew since the campaign of Nearchus (died 300 BC), and which also has been occasionally identified with Bushehr.

=== Rise ===
In 1734, Iranian military commander Nader Shah made Bushehr, then still a minor fishing village, the headquarters of the Persian Gulf fleet that he sought to create. This marked the start of Bushehr's rising importance. In order to build a massive warship, Nader even brought heavy wood from Mazandaran's forests, which was 1,000 km away from Bushehr. The shell of this ship drew notice from European travelers for the next 50 years. The naval aspirations of Nader ended when he was murdered in 1747, but Bushehr continued to serve as a prominent port for at least the following 150 years. Between 1737 and 1753, the Dutch East India Company operated a trading post in Bushehr.

In 1763, the Arab ruler of Bushehr Sheikh Nasr Al-Madhkur granted the British East India Company the right to build a base and trading and 'residency' post there, securing the monopoly of the import of woolen goods into Persia to the exclusion of other European nations. It was used as a base by the British Royal Navy in the late 18th century. In the 19th century, Bushehr became an important commercial port. It was occupied by British forces in 1856, during the Anglo-Persian War 1856-1857. Bushehr surrendered to the British in December 1856.

Aside from Bushehr's strategic significance—being situated 300 km from Shiraz and 600 km from that of Ottoman-ruled Basra—the place offered few benefits and numerous drawbacks. The town and its surrounding area were somewhat shielded by the interior's hilly terrain and narrow gorges, but were still vulnerable to pirate intrusion. In the 19th century, European ships had to dock around four kilometers offshore and transfer freight and passengers through small boats, due to the shallow path to both the shoreline and the bay. Despite the numerous windcatchers on top of the houses, the water in the wells was salty, and the summer heat and humidity were unbearable.

=== The main commercial port of Iran ===
Bushehr soon replaced Bandar Abbas as the country's most important commercial port. This was because of Iran's political and economic centre being moved to Shiraz under the Zand ruler Karim Khan Zand (r. 1751–1779), who had established his authority in western Iran.

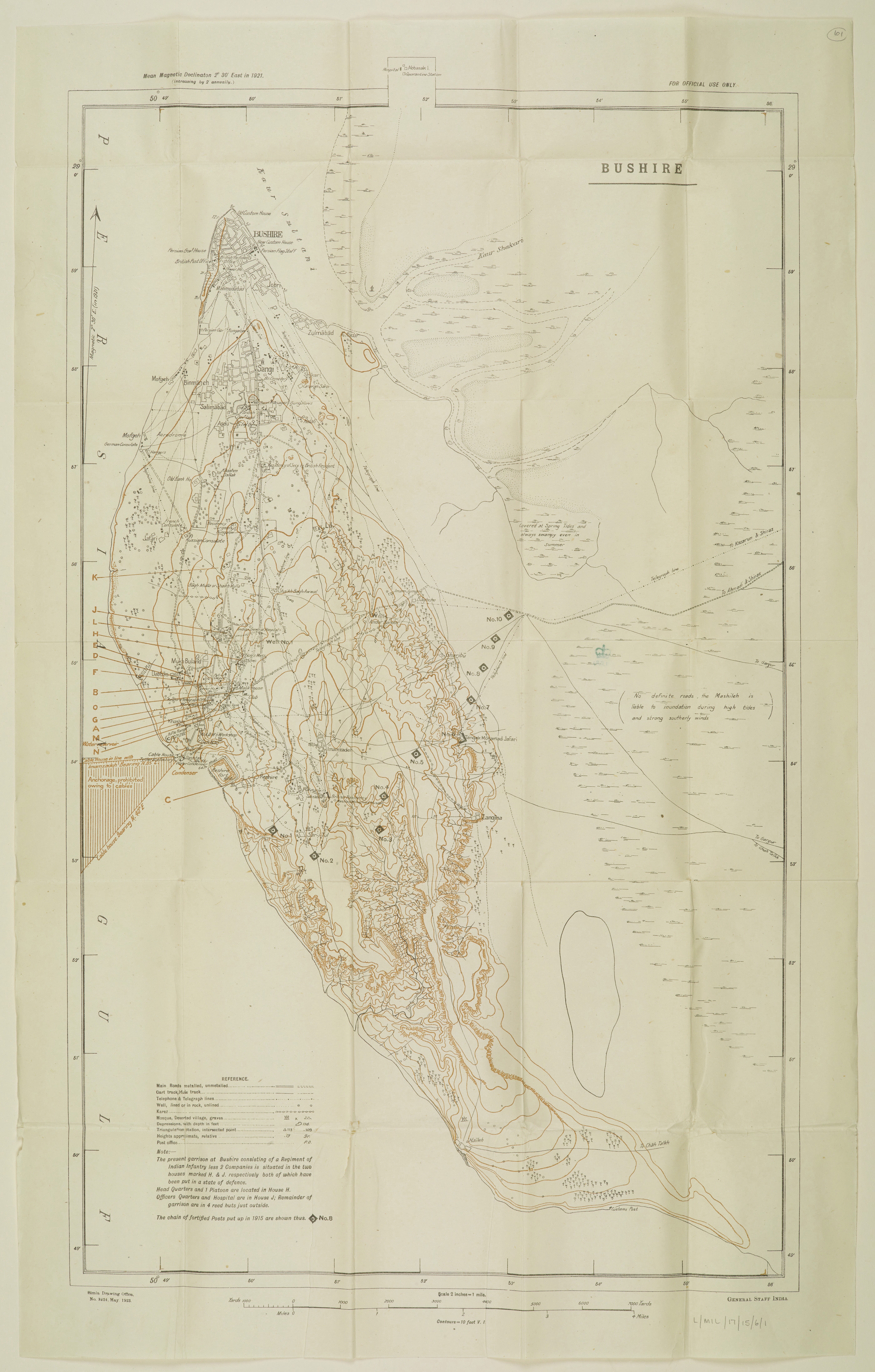
A 1923 map of Bushehr and the surrounding area

== Demographics ==
=== Language ===
Linguistic composition of the city.

Bushehr, Iran linguistic composition
language	percent
Mixed	42.4%
Bushehri Persian	25%
Tehrani Persian	23.4%
Arabic	2.23%
Koroshi Balochi	0.05%

=== Population ===
Population history
Year	Pop.	±%
1956	18,412	—
1966	23,547	+27.9%
1976	58,956	+150.4%
1986	120,787	+104.9%
1991	132,824	+10.0%
1996	143,641	+8.1%
2006	161,674	+12.6%
2011	195,222	+20.8%
2016	223,504	+14.5%

In the 2006 census, the city's population was 161,674 people, in 25,158 households. The 2011 census counted 195,222 people in 52,204 households. The 2016 census counted 223,504 people in 63,820 households.

== Climate ==
Bushehr has a hot semi-arid climate (Köppen: BSh) with a precipitation pattern resembling a Mediterranean climate, albeit it is both too hot and dry for too long to qualify as such, by a wide margin, due to the threshold for hot climates being much higher in terms of required rainfall.

Climate data for Bushehr (1991–2020)
Month	Jan	Feb	Mar	Apr	May	Jun	Jul	Aug	Sep	Oct	Nov	Dec	Year
Record high °C (°F)	30.0 (86.0)	32.0 (89.6)	38.0 (100.4)	42.5 (108.5)	47.0 (116.6)	48.6 (119.5)	50.0 (122.0)	47.0 (116.6)	48.5 (119.3)	41.0 (105.8)	35.4 (95.7)	32.0 (89.6)	50.0 (122.0)
Mean daily maximum °C (°F)	20.0 (68.0)	21.1 (70.0)	24.4 (75.9)	29.6 (85.3)	34.2 (93.6)	35.8 (96.4)	37.1 (98.8)	37.7 (99.9)	36.4 (97.5)	33.2 (91.8)	27.2 (81.0)	22.3 (72.1)	29.9 (85.8)
Daily mean °C (°F)	15.7 (60.3)	16.8 (62.2)	19.9 (67.8)	24.6 (76.3)	29.3 (84.7)	31.7 (89.1)	33.3 (91.9)	34.0 (93.2)	32.2 (90.0)	28.5 (83.3)	22.5 (72.5)	17.7 (63.9)	25.5 (77.9)
Mean daily minimum °C (°F)	12.2 (54.0)	13.4 (56.1)	16.3 (61.3)	21.1 (70.0)	25.9 (78.6)	28.6 (83.5)	30.4 (86.7)	30.7 (87.3)	28.1 (82.6)	24.1 (75.4)	18.4 (65.1)	14.0 (57.2)	21.9 (71.4)
Record low °C (°F)	−1.0 (30.2)	2.5 (36.5)	5.0 (41.0)	8.0 (46.4)	14.0 (57.2)	18.0 (64.4)	21.0 (69.8)	22.0 (71.6)	17.0 (62.6)	12.0 (53.6)	5.0 (41.0)	2.0 (35.6)	−1.0 (30.2)
Average precipitation mm (inches)	78.1 (3.07)	25.9 (1.02)	19.6 (0.77)	6.1 (0.24)	1.5 (0.06)	0.0 (0.0)	0.5 (0.02)	0.4 (0.02)	0.0 (0.0)	6.9 (0.27)	60.1 (2.37)	60.9 (2.40)	260.0 (10.24)
Average precipitation days (≥ 1.0 mm)	5.3	3.2	2.8	1.7	0.4	0.0	0.1	0.0	0.0	0.6	3.7	4.3	22.1
Average relative humidity (%)	73.0	71.0	68.0	63.0	60.0	64.0	67.0	69.0	67.0	65.0	64.0	72.0	66.9
Average dew point °C (°F)	10.7 (51.3)	11.3 (52.3)	13.5 (56.3)	16.8 (62.2)	20.4 (68.7)	23.7 (74.7)	26.2 (79.2)	27.4 (81.3)	25.0 (77.0)	21.1 (70.0)	15.0 (59.0)	12.4 (54.3)	18.6 (65.5)
Mean monthly sunshine hours	204	195	226	240	299	330	318	314	296	285	227	208	3,142
Source 1: NOAA
Source 2: Iran Meteorological Organization (records)

Climate data for Bushehr (1951–2010)
Month	Jan	Feb	Mar	Apr	May	Jun	Jul	Aug	Sep	Oct	Nov	Dec	Year
Record high °C (°F)	30.0 (86.0)	32.0 (89.6)	38.0 (100.4)	42.5 (108.5)	47.0 (116.6)	48.6 (119.5)	50.0 (122.0)	47.0 (116.6)	46.0 (114.8)	41.0 (105.8)	34.5 (94.1)	32.0 (89.6)	50.0 (122.0)
Mean daily maximum °C (°F)	18.6 (65.5)	20.2 (68.4)	24.2 (75.6)	29.6 (85.3)	34.5 (94.1)	36.4 (97.5)	37.8 (100.0)	38.1 (100.6)	36.6 (97.9)	32.9 (91.2)	26.6 (79.9)	21.0 (69.8)	29.7 (85.5)
Daily mean °C (°F)	14.5 (58.1)	15.8 (60.4)	19.3 (66.7)	24.3 (75.7)	29.0 (84.2)	31.4 (88.5)	33.1 (91.6)	33.3 (91.9)	30.8 (87.4)	26.9 (80.4)	21.3 (70.3)	16.5 (61.7)	24.7 (76.5)
Mean daily minimum °C (°F)	10.3 (50.5)	11.4 (52.5)	14.4 (57.9)	18.9 (66.0)	23.6 (74.5)	26.3 (79.3)	28.4 (83.1)	28.4 (83.1)	25.1 (77.2)	20.9 (69.6)	16.0 (60.8)	12.0 (53.6)	19.6 (67.3)
Record low °C (°F)	−1.0 (30.2)	2.5 (36.5)	5.0 (41.0)	8.0 (46.4)	14.0 (57.2)	18.0 (64.4)	21.0 (69.8)	22.0 (71.6)	17.0 (62.6)	12.0 (53.6)	5.0 (41.0)	2.0 (35.6)	−1.0 (30.2)
Average precipitation mm (inches)	78.5 (3.09)	31.8 (1.25)	22.4 (0.88)	8.6 (0.34)	2.6 (0.10)	0.0 (0.0)	0.0 (0.0)	0.3 (0.01)	0.0 (0.0)	5.7 (0.22)	39.4 (1.55)	78.7 (3.10)	268.0 (10.55)
Average precipitation days (≥ 1.0 mm)	5.9	3.4	3.1	1.7	0.4	0.0	0.0	0.0	0.0	0.5	2.7	5.3	22.0
Average relative humidity (%)	75	72	66	60	56	58	61	65	65	66	66	73	65
Mean monthly sunshine hours	199.1	195.4	217.4	232.0	292.5	329.7	314.0	320.9	293.8	279.0	227.3	193.5	3,094.6
Source: Iran Meteorological Organization (records), (temperatures), (precipitation), (humidity), (days with precipitation), (sunshine)

== Nuclear development ==
Bushehr is twelve kilometres from the site of the Bushehr Nuclear Power Plant being built in cooperation with Russia. The work was begun by the Bonn firm Kraftwerk Union A.G., a unit of Siemens AG, which contracted to build two nuclear reactors based on a contract worth $4 to $6 billion, signed in 1975.

Work stopped in January 1979, and Kraftwerk Union fully withdrew from the project in July 1979, with one reactor 50% complete, and the other reactor 85% complete. They said they based their action on Iran's non-payment of $450 million in overdue payments. The company had received $2.5 billion of the total contract. Their cancellation came following the 1979 Iranian Revolution. Iran requested that Siemens finish construction, but Siemens declined. Shortly afterward Iraq invaded Iran and the nuclear programme was stopped until the end of the war. The reactors were damaged by multiple Iraqi airstrikes between March 1984 and 1988.

In 1995, Russia signed a contract to supply a light water reactor for the plant. The contract was believed to be valued between $700 million and $1.2 billion USD. The agreement calls for the spent fuel rods to be sent back to Russia for reprocessing. The plant started adding electricity to the national grid in September 2011.

== See also ==
Media related to Bushehr at Wikimedia Commons

Bushehr travel guide from Wikivoyage

== Sources ==
- Perry, John R. (2017). "Bushire". In Fleet, Kate; Krämer, Gudrun; Matringe, Denis; Nawas, John; Rowson, Everett (eds.). Encyclopaedia of Islam (3rd ed.). Brill Online. ISSN 1873-9830.
- de Planhol, Xavier (1990). "Būšehr i. The City". Encyclopaedia Iranica.
