= Khunapakan =

Map of the Sasanian province of Pars.

Khunapakan was the name of a medieval district in the Sasanian province of Pars. It is mentioned as a district of the administrative division of Ardashir-Khwarrah in the Madigan-i Hezar Dadistan.

== Sources ==
- Miri, Negin (2009). "Historical Geography of Fars during the Sasanian Period" (PDF). Sasanika. University of Sydney. pp. 1–65. Archived from the original (PDF) on 2016-04-04.
