= Abruwan =

Abruwan was a Sasanian-era village located in the rural district of Dasht-e Barin in the administrative division of Ardashir-Khwarrah, in southwestern Pars. It may be identical with its namesake, the coastal town of Abruwan, which notably suffered from the Arab raids during the early reign of Shapur II (r. 309–370). Abruwan is notable for being the birthplace of Mihr-Narseh, the minister (wuzurg framadar) of the Sasanian monarchs Yazdegerd I (r. 399–420), Bahram V (r. 420–438), Yazdegerd II (r. 438–457) and Peroz I (r. 457–484). There Mihr-Narseh had several buildings, including fire temples, constructed. One of the fire temples was named Mihr-Narsiyan, and was still kindled by the 11th century. He also founded four villages in the neighbourhood of Abruwan, where fire temples were constructed along each palm, olive and cypress garden. These foundations served as the hereditary property of Mihr-Narseh descendants until the 11th century.

The location of Abruwan is uncertain, it is presumed to be situated between Firuzabad and Tawwaj.

== Sources ==
- Daryaee, Touraj (2000). "Mehr-Narseh". Encyclopaedia Iranica.
- Miri, Negin (2012). "Sasanian Pars: Historical Geography and Administrative Organization". Sasanika: 1–183.
