= Mihr-Narseh =

Sasanian nobleman and minister

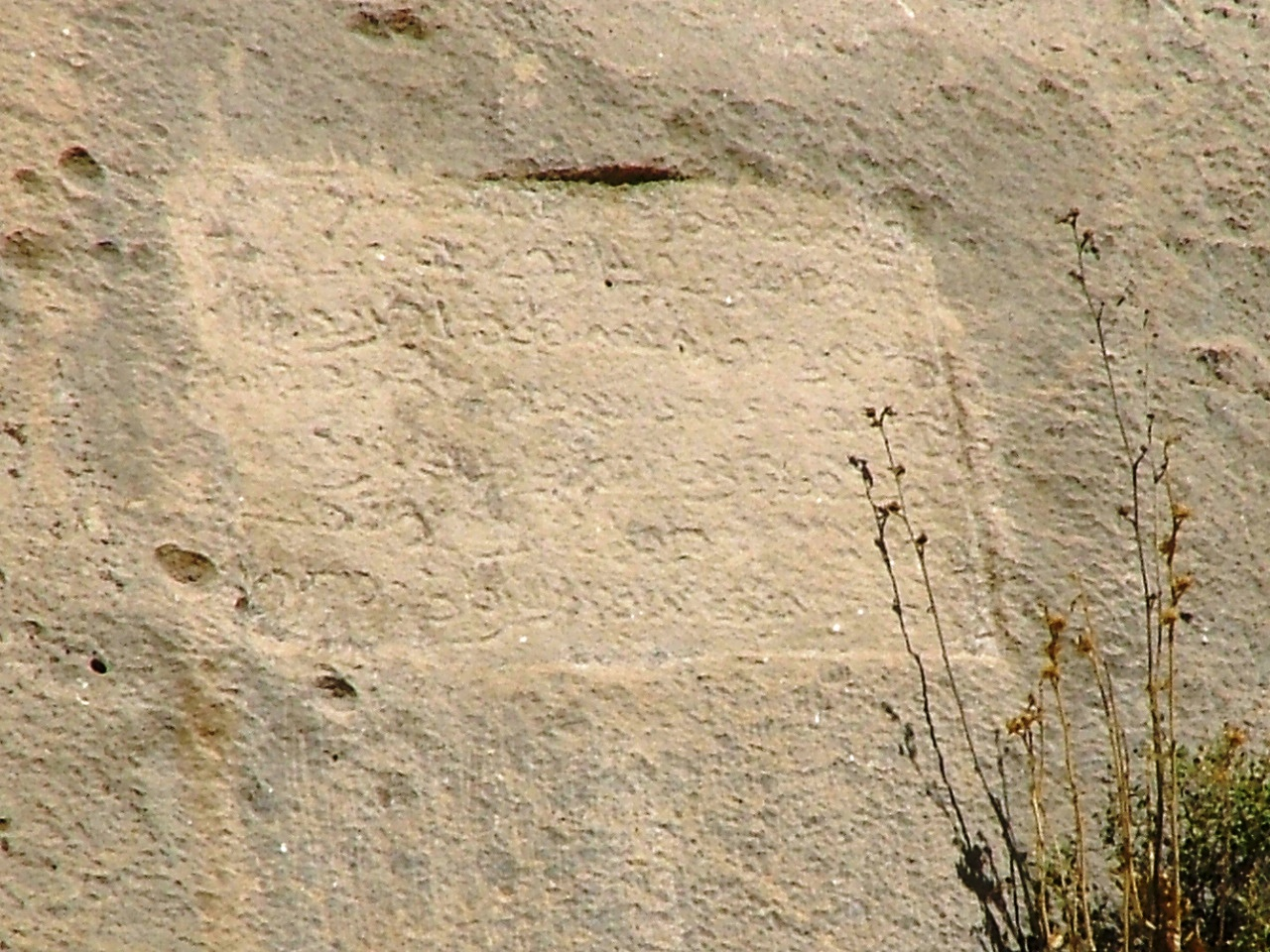
- Inscription of Mihr-Narseh in Gor
- Born: 4th century Abruwan, Pars, Iran
- Died: 5th century Abruwan, Pars, Iran
- Children: Zurvandad; Mahgushnasp; Kardar
- Military career
- Allegiance: Sasanian Empire
- Rank: Wuzurg framadar
- Conflicts: Roman–Sasanian War of 421–422; Battle of Avarayr

Mihr-Narseh (Middle Persian: 𐭬𐭲𐭥𐭭𐭥𐭮𐭧𐭩 mtrnrshy), was a powerful Iranian dignitary from the House of Suren, who served as minister (wuzurg framadār) of the Sasanian shahanshahs Yazdegerd I (r. 399–420), Bahram V (r. 420–438), Yazdegerd II (r. 438–457) and Peroz I (r. 457–484). According to the Iranologist Richard N. Frye, Mihr-Narseh was the "prototype of the later Islamic grand vizier."

Notable for his religious zeal, Mihr-Narseh was the architect behind the Roman–Sasanian War of 421–422 and the Battle of Avarayr.

== Etymology ==
The name of Mihr-Narseh is a combination of the Middle Iranian theophoric names of Mihr (Mithra) and Narseh (Nairiiō.saŋha).

== Background ==
Mihr-Narseh was born in the 4th-century in the village of Abruwan in the rural district of Dasht-e Barin in the administrative division of Ardashir-Khwarrah, in southwestern Pars. He belonged to the House of Suren, one of the Seven Great Houses of Iran. The family, of Parthian origin, had been active in Iranian politics since the Arsacid Empire, and held parts of Sakastan as their personal fiefdom. It was thus unusual for a Surenid to be a native of Pars, which illustrates their extensive authority and influence during this period, which made them able to spread their influence to Pars, the homeland of the ruling Persian Sasanian family. It is unknown if the Suren branch of Pars adopted the title of Pārsīg (Persian). Mihr-Narseh's father was a certain Borāza, who may have owned the land he was born in. According to the medieval historian al-Tabari (d. 923), Mihr-Narseh traced his descent back to the legendary Kayanian king Vishtaspa and the first Arsacid king, Arsaces I (r. 247 – 217 BC).

== Career ==
The Sasanian Empire in the mid 5th-century

During the reign of Yazdegerd I (r. 399–420), Mihr-Narseh was appointed his minister (wuzurg framadār); this probably took place after some Christians had destroyed Zoroastrian fire temples, which resulted in a withdrawal of Yazdegerd I's tolerant policies, and led to the persecutions of the Christians. Mihr-Narseh continued to maintain the position under Bahram V, where Suren power reached its zenith. Mihr-Narseh's three sons also occupied high offices; Zurvandad served as the chief herbad of the empire; Māhgušnasp was the wāstryōšān sālār ("chief agriculturalist"), which meant that he oversaw the affairs of the land tax; Kārdār was the arteštārān sālār ("chief of the warriors"), a rank, which according to al-Tabari, was higher than that of spāhbed ("army chief"). The power and influence of the Suren family thus spread over the administrative, financial, and military affairs of the Sasanian Empire. They would continue to enjoy such as high status under Bahram's son and successor Yazdegerd II (r. 438–457) as well. Mihr-Narseh was the prime instigator of the Roman–Sasanian War of 421–422, and himself led the army in battle. In 453, Yazdegerd II moved his court to Nishapur in Abarshahr to face the threat from the Kidarites and left Mihr-Narseh in charge of the Sasanian realm.

One of Yazdegerd II's policies was to integrate the Christian nobility into the bureaucracy by forcing them to convert to Zoroastrianism, which led to a major rebellion in Armenia. The cause of the rebellion was the attempt of Mihr-Narseh to impose the Zurvanite variant of Zoroastrianism in Armenia. His intentions differed from those of Yazdegerd II. As a result, many of the Armenian nobles (but not all) rallied under Vardan Mamikonian, the supreme commander (sparapet) of Armenia. The Armenian rebels tried to appeal to the Romans for help, but to no avail. Meanwhile, another faction of Armenians, led by the marzbān Vasak Siwni allied themselves with the Sasanians. On 2 June 451, the Sasanian and rebel forces clashed at Avarayr, with the Sasanians emerging victorious. Nine generals, including Vardan Mamikonian, were killed, with a large number of the Armenian nobles and soldiers meeting the same fate. The Sasanians, however, had also suffered heavy losses due to the resolute struggle by the Armenian rebels. Under Peroz I (r. 457–484), Zurvanism was seemingly rejected, although Mihr-Narseh kept his post as minister. During the reign of Peroz, Mihr-Narseh was assigned as a servant to a fire-temple in the newly formed sub-Caucasian province of Ormzdperoz. Mihr-Narseh later retired in Pars.

== Constructions ==
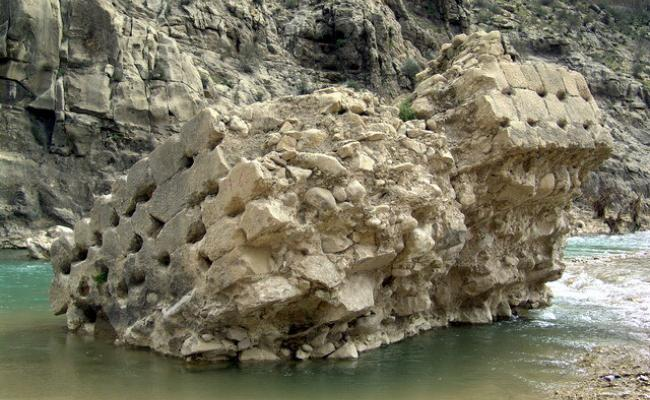
Remains of Mihr-Narseh's bridge in Gor, present-day Firuzabad

In the early 5th-century, Mihr-Narseh had a bridge built in Gor. An inscription was also written on the bridge, which says; "This bridge was built by order of Mihr-Narseh, wuzurg framadār, for his soul's sake and at his own expense... Whoever has come on this road let him give a blessing to Mihr-Narseh and his sons for that he thus bridged this crossing." Furthermore, he also founded four villages with a fire-temple in each of them. The name of the fire-temples were; Farāz-marā-awar-xwadāyā, Zurvandādān, Kārdādān, and Māhgušnaspān. He had a fifth fire-temple constructed in Abruwān, which may have been the Barin fire-temple that the 10th-century geographer Istakhri visited, who stated that the fire-temple had an inscription that stated 30,000 dirhams was spent for its construction.

== Sources ==
- Avdoyan, Levon (2018). "Avarayr, Battle of (Awarayr)". In Nicholson, Oliver (ed.). The Oxford Dictionary of Late Antiquity. Oxford: Oxford University Press. ISBN 978-0-19-866277-8.
- Brunner, Christopher (1983). "Geographical and Administrative divisions: Settlements and Economy". The Cambridge History of Iran: The Seleucid, Parthian, and Sasanian periods (2). Cambridge: Cambridge University Press. pp. 747–778. ISBN 978-0-521-24693-4.
- Daryaee, Touraj (2014). Sasanian Persia: The Rise and Fall of an Empire. I.B.Tauris. pp. 1–240. ISBN 978-0857716668.
- Jam, Pedram (2017). "Hrakʿotperož and Spandaranperož: Armenian Gawaṙs and Sasanian Šahrs". Iran & the Caucasus. 21 (1). Brill: 46–54.
- Nersessian, Vrej (2018). "Persarmenia". In Nicholson, Oliver (ed.). The Oxford Dictionary of Late Antiquity. Oxford: Oxford University Press. ISBN 978-0-19-866277-8.
- Sauer, Eberhard (2017). Sasanian Persia: Between Rome and the Steppes of Eurasia. London and New York: Edinburgh University Press. pp. 1–336. ISBN 9781474401029.
- Shahbazi, A. Shapur (2003). "Yazdegerd I". Encyclopaedia Iranica.
- Pourshariati, Parvaneh (2008). Decline and Fall of the Sasanian Empire: The Sasanian-Parthian Confederacy and the Arab Conquest of Iran. London and New York: I.B. Tauris. ISBN 978-1-84511-645-3.
- Daryaee, Touraj (2000). "Mehr-Narseh". Encyclopaedia Iranica.
- Daryaee, Touraj. "Yazdegerd II". Encyclopaedia Iranica.
- Perikhanian, A. (1983). "Iranian Society and Law". The Cambridge History of Iran: The Seleucid, Parthian, and Sasanian periods (2). Cambridge: Cambridge University Press. pp. 627–681. ISBN 978-0-521-24693-4.
- Gazerani, Saghi (2015). The Sistani Cycle of Epics and Iran's National History: On the Margins of Historiography. BRILL. pp. 1–250. ISBN 9789004282964.
- Hewsen, R. (1987). "Avarayr". Encyclopaedia Iranica, Vol. III, Fasc. 1. p. 32.
- Frye, R. N. (1983). "The political history of Iran under the Sasanians". In Yarshater, Ehsan (ed.). The Cambridge History of Iran: The Seleucid, Parthian and Sasanian Periods. Vol. 3(1). Cambridge: Cambridge University Press. ISBN 0-521-20092-X.
