= Bokht-Ardashir =

Ancient city in Iran

Map of the Sasanian province of Pars.

Bokht-Ardashir (Middle Persian: Bōkht-Artaxshīr, lit. 'saved by Ardashir') was a medieval town in the Sasanian province of Pars. It was founded in the early 3rd century by the first Sasanian king Ardashir I (r. 224–242) after his flight from the court of the last Parthian king, Artabanus V. In 224, it was incorporated into the administrative division of Ardashir-Khwarrah.

== Sources ==
- Al-Tabari, Abu Ja'far Muhammad ibn Jarir (1985–2007). Ehsan Yar-Shater (ed.). The History of Al-Ṭabarī. Vol. 40 vols. Albany, NY: State University of New York Press.
- Miri, Negin (2009). "Historical Geography of Fars during the Sasanian Period" (PDF). Sasanika. University of Sydney. pp. 1–65. Archived from the original (PDF) on 2016-04-04.
