= Zurvandad =

Zurvandad (also spelled Zurwandad, fl. 5th century CE) was an Iranian nobleman from the House of Suren who served as the leader of the Zoroastrian priesthood. He was the eldest son of the powerful minister Mihr Narseh and had two brothers named Kardar and Mahgushnasp. His name means "given by Zurvan". Bearing that name does not automatically imply that a person was an adherent of Zurvanism. However, Zurvandad's father was a Zurvanist, meaning that Zurwandad himself was also probably a Zurvanist. During the reign of king Peroz I, Zurvanism was declared illegal and was shunned from the Zoroastrian society. Zurvandad may be the same person mentioned in the Vendidad who had disputed Ahura Mazda as the supreme god of Zoroastrianism.

== Sources ==
- Daryaee, Touraj (2012a). "MEHR-NARSEH". Encyclopaedia Iranica.
- Daryaee, Touraj (2012b). "Zurwāndād". Encyclopaedia Iranica.
