= Farrukhmard =

Persian writer

Farrukhmard was a 7th-century Iranian, who was the author of the Madigan-i Hazar Dadistan ("Book of a Thousand Judicial Decisions"), a crucial part of the collection of legal documents used during the Sasanian period. The son of a certain Bahram, Farrukhmard completed the book in ca. 620, during the reign of the Sasanian king Khosrow II (r. 590-628). The book used some of its information from the archives of his native city, Gur, and also some privately owned archives. Nothing more is known about Farrukhmard; he probably died in the 7th-century.

== Sources ==
- Tafazzoli, A.; Khromov, A. L. (1996). "Sasanian Iran - intellectual life". History of Civilizations of Central Asia, Volume III: The Crossroads of Civilizations: A.D. 250 to 750. Paris: UNESCO. pp. 79–103. ISBN 92-3-103211-9.
