= Sasanian art =

Art of the Sasanian Empire

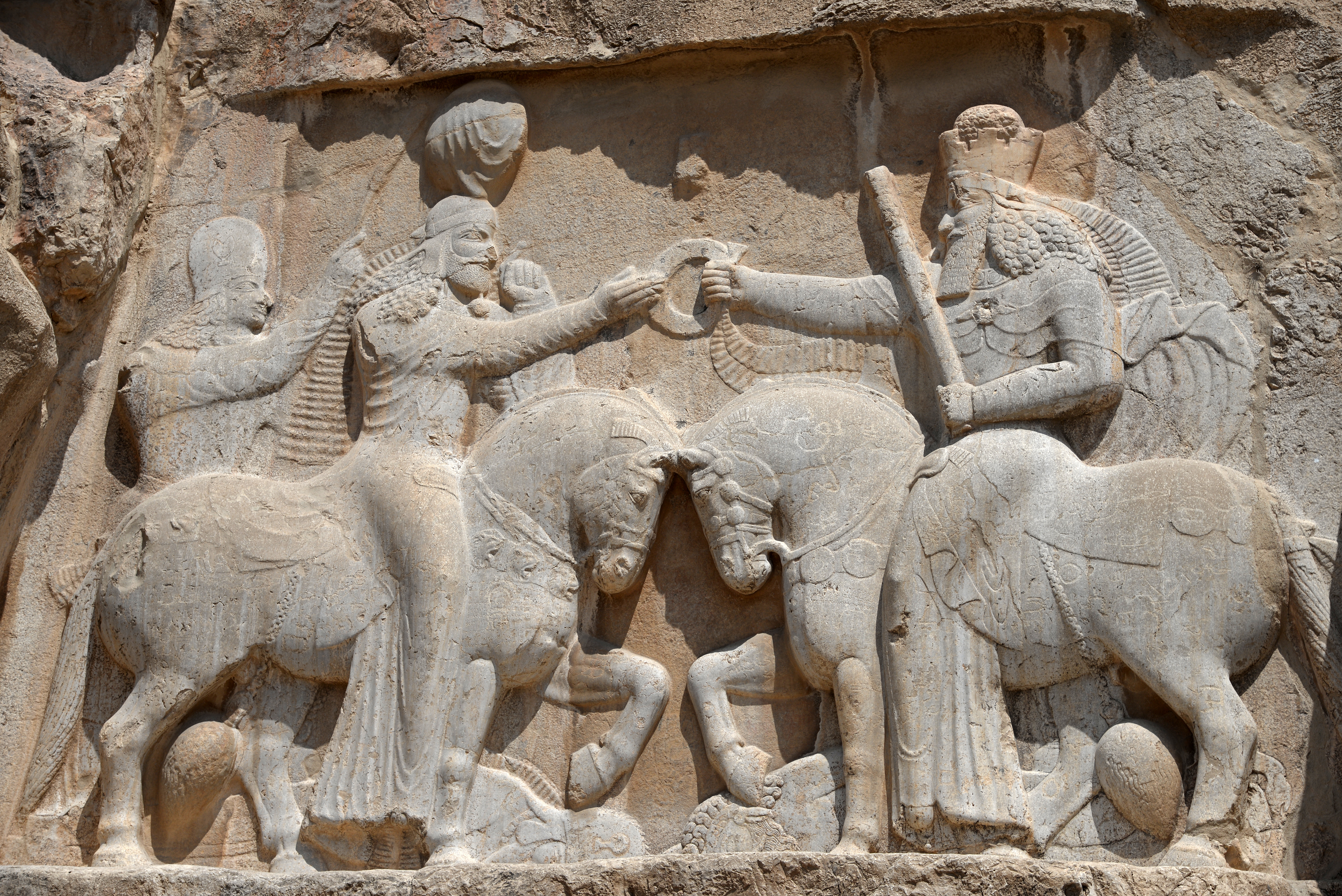
Ardashir I receives the ring of power from Ahura Mazda.

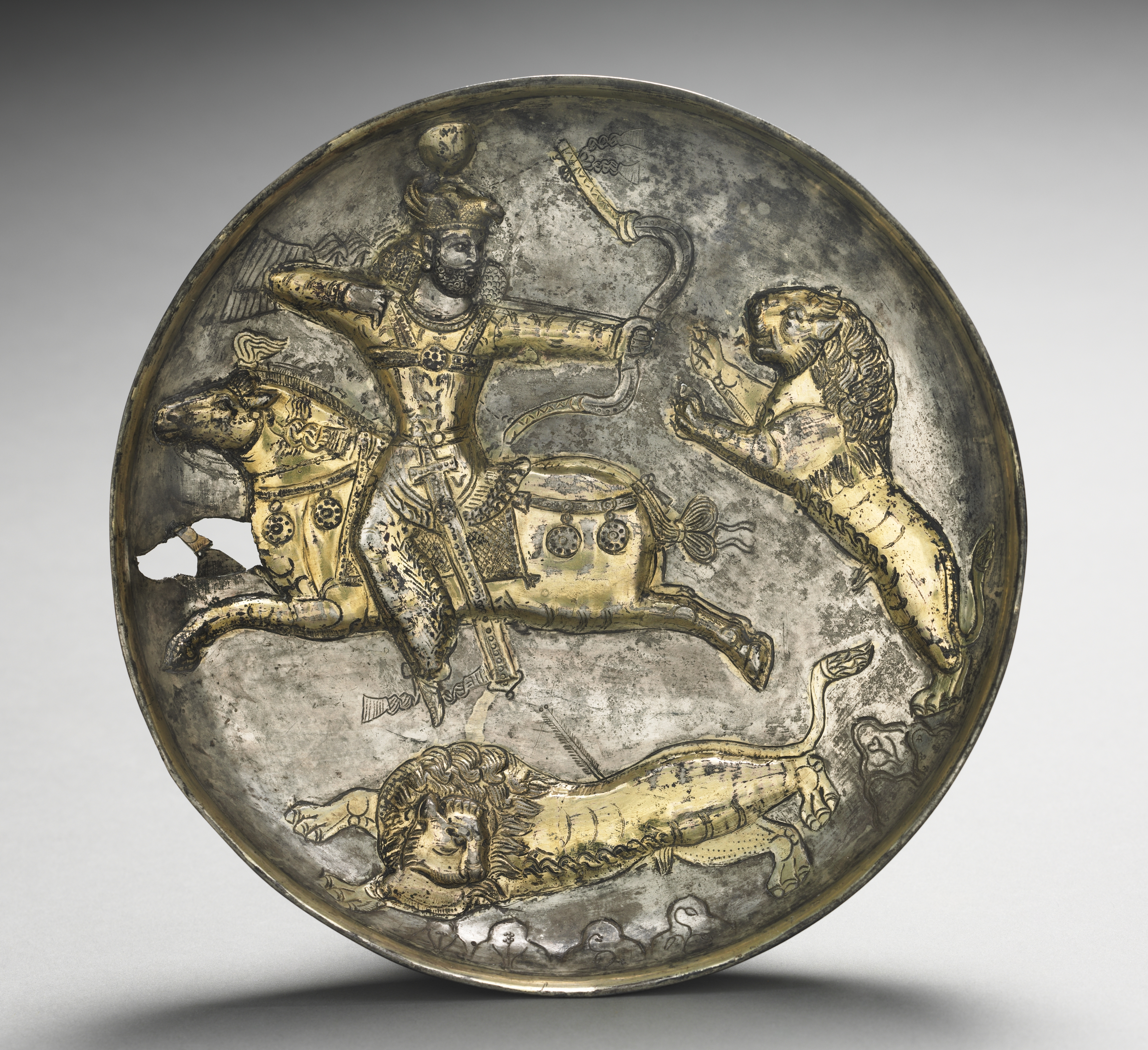
Silver-gilt bowl with king hunting, a typical subject in Sasanian metalwork

Sasanian art, or Sassanid art, was produced under the Sasanian Empire which ruled from the 3rd to 7th centuries AD, before the Muslim conquest of Persia was completed around 651. In 224 AD, the last Parthian king was defeated by Ardashir I. The resulting Sasanian dynasty would last for four hundred years, ruling modern Iran, Iraq, and much territory to the east and north of modern Iran. At times the Levant, much of Anatolia and parts of Egypt and Arabia were under its control. It began a new era in Iran and Mesopotamia, which in many ways was built on Achaemenid traditions, including the art of the period. Nevertheless, there were also other influences on art of the period that came from as far as China and the Mediterranean.

The surviving art of the Sasanians is best seen in its architecture, reliefs and metalwork, and there are some surviving paintings from what was evidently a widespread production. Stone reliefs were probably greatly outnumbered by interior ones in plaster, of which only fragments have survived. Free standing sculptures are fewer than in Parthian art, but the Colossal Statue of Shapur I (r. AD 240–272) is a major exception, carved from a stalagmite grown in a cave; there are literary mentions of other colossal statues of kings, now lost. There are important Sasanian rock reliefs, and the Parthian tradition of moulded stucco decoration to buildings continued, also including large figurative scenes.

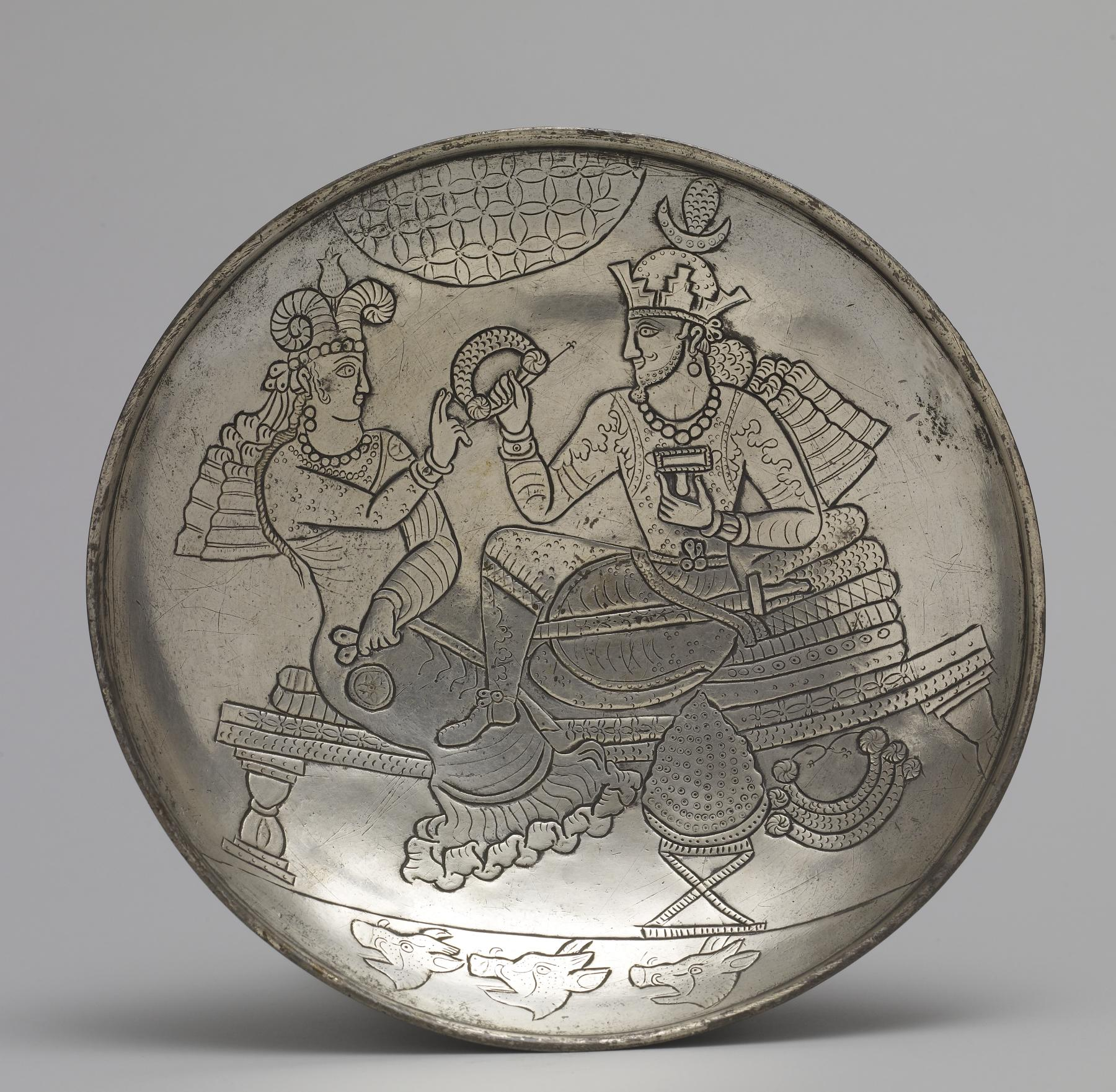
Silver plate, 6th century

Surviving Sasanian art depicts courtly and chivalric scenes, with considerable grandeur of style, reflecting the lavish life and display of the Sasanian court as recorded by Byzantine ambassadors. Images of rulers dominate many of the surviving works, though none are as large as the Colossal Statue of Shapur I. Hunting and battle scenes enjoyed a special popularity, and lightly clothed dancing girls and entertainers. Although Parthian art preferred the front view, the narrative representations of the Sasanian art often features figures shown in the profile or a three-quarter view. Frontal views occur less frequently.

== Sculpture and rock reliefs ==
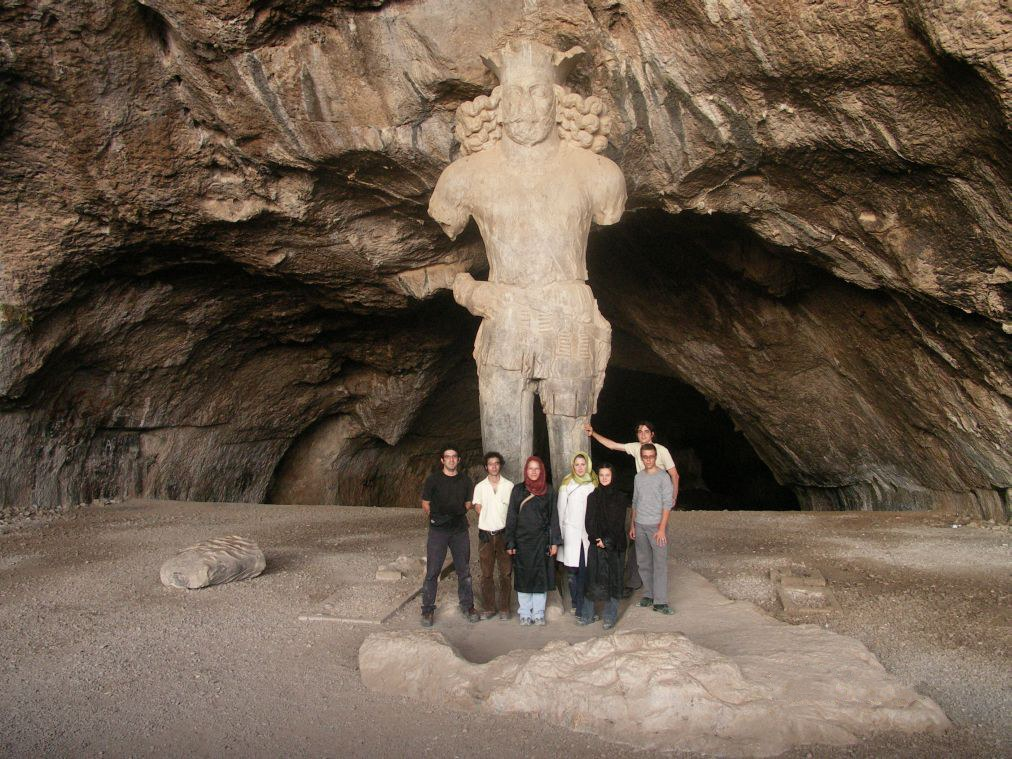
The Colossal Statue of Shapur I, r. AD 240–272

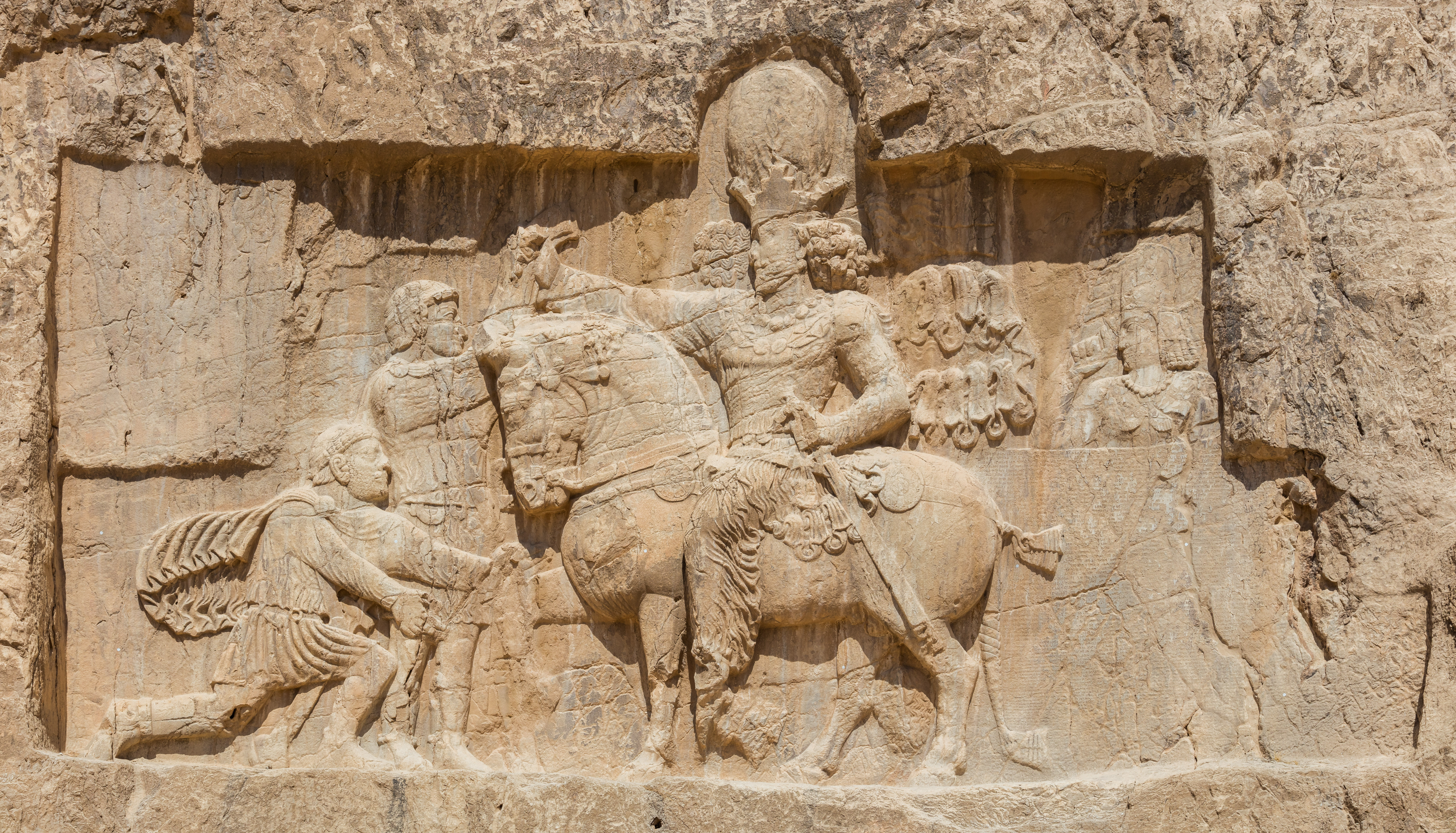
The triumph of Shapur I over the Roman Emperor Valerian, and Philip the Arab, Naqsh-e Rostam.

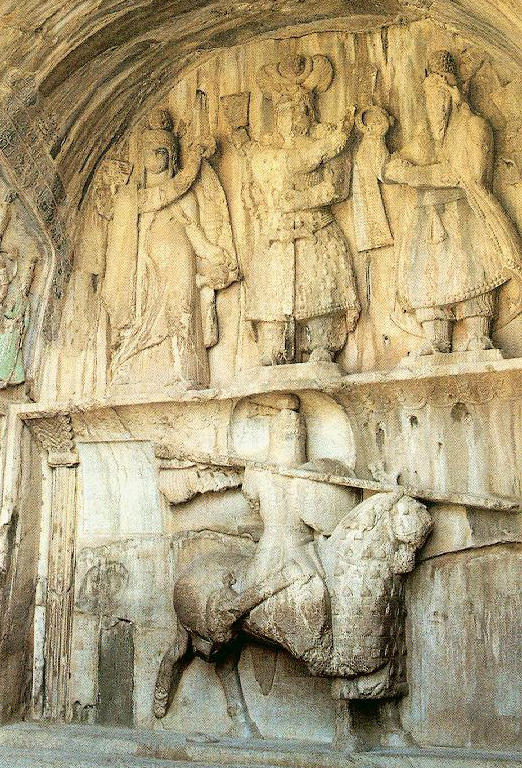
Taq-e Bostan; the "knight" is probably Khosrow Parviz mounted on Shabdiz

Compared to the Parthian era, free standing sculptures are rare in this period. The Colossal Statue of Shapur I (r. AD 240–272) is the single outstanding exception to survive.

The large carved rock relief, typically placed high beside a road, and near a source of water, is a common medium in Persian art, mostly used to glorify the king and proclaim Persian control over territory. It begins with Lullubi and Elamite rock reliefs, such as those at Kul-e Farah and Eshkaft-e Salman in southwest Iran, and continues under the Assyrians. The Behistun relief and inscription, carved around 500 BC for Darius the Great, is on a far grander scale, reflecting and proclaiming the power of the Achaemenid Empire. Persian rulers commonly boasted of their power and achievements, until the Muslim conquest removed imagery from such monuments; much later there was a small revival during the Qajar era.

Behistun is unusual in having a large and important inscription, similar to the Egyptian Rosetta Stone it repeats its text in three different languages, and was important in the modern understanding of these languages. Other Persian reliefs generally lack inscriptions, and the kings involved often can only be tentatively identified. The problem is helped in the case of the Sassanids by their custom of showing a different style of crown for each king, which can be identified from their coins.

Naqsh-e Rostam is the necropolis of the Achaemenid dynasty (500–330 BC), with four large tombs cut high into the cliff face. These have mainly architectural decoration, but the facades include large panels over the doorways, each very similar in content, with figures of the king being invested by a god, above a zone with rows of smaller figures bearing tribute, with soldiers and officials. The three classes of figures are sharply differentiated in size. The entrance to each tomb is at the centre of each cross, which opens onto a small chamber, where the king lay in a sarcophagus. The horizontal beam of each of the tomb's facades is believed to be a replica of the entrance of the palace at Persepolis.

Well below the Achaemenid tombs, near ground level, are rock reliefs with large figures of Sassanian kings, some meeting gods, others in combat. The most famous shows Shapur I on horseback, with the Roman Emperor Valerian bowing to him in submission, and Philip the Arab (an earlier emperor who paid Shapur tribute) holding Shapur's horse, while the dead Emperor Gordian III, killed in battle, lies beneath it (other identifications have been suggested). This commemorates the Battle of Edessa in 260 AD, when Valerian became the only Roman Emperor who was captured as a prisoner of war, a lasting humiliation for the Romans. The placing of these reliefs clearly suggests the Sassanid intention to link themselves with the glories of the earlier Achaemenid Empire. There are three further Achaemenid royal tombs with similar reliefs at Persepolis, one unfinished.

The seven Sassanian reliefs, whose approximate dates range from 225 to 310 AD, show subjects including investiture scenes and battles. The earliest relief at the site is Elamite, from about 1000 BC. About a kilometre away is Naqsh-e Rajab, with a further four Sassanid rock reliefs, three celebrating kings and one a high priest. Another important Sassanid site is Taq-e Bostan with several reliefs including two royal investitures and a famous figure of a cataphract or Persian heavy cavalryman, about twice life size, probably representing the king Khosrow Parviz mounted on his favourite horse Shabdiz; the pair continued to be celebrated in later Persian literature. Firuzabad and Bishapur have groups of Sasanian reliefs, the former including the oldest, a large battle scene, now badly worn. At Barm-e Delak, a king offers a flower to his queen.

Sasanian reliefs are concentrated in the first 80 years of the dynasty, though one important set are 6th-century, and at relatively few sites, mostly in the Sassanid heartland. The later ones in particular suggest that they draw on a now-lost tradition of similar reliefs in palaces in stucco. The rock reliefs were probably coated in plaster and painted.

The standard catalogue of pre-Islamic Persian reliefs lists the known examples (as at 1984) as follows: Lullubi #1–4; Elam #5–19; Assyrian #20–21; Achaemenid #22–30; Late/Post-Achaemenid and Seleucid #31–35; Parthian #36–49; Sasanian #50–84; others #85–88.

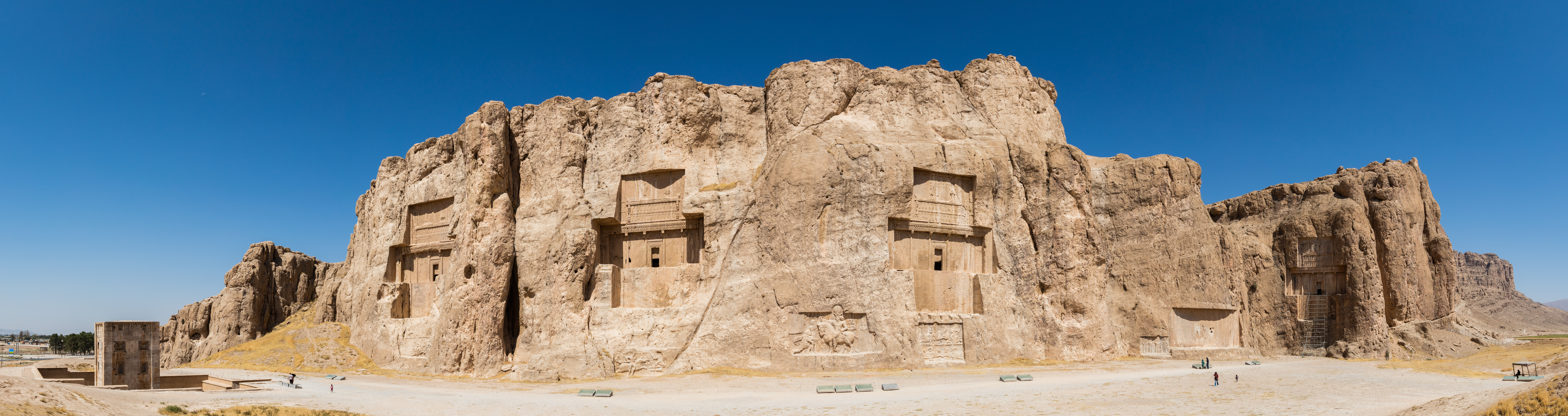
Panorama of Naqsh-e Rostam. Achaemenid tombs above, Sassanian reliefs below. The tombs, from left to right, probably belong to: Darius II, Artaxerxes I, Darius I, Xerxes I

Many symbolic badges are found in the forms of various plant and animal figures in the reliefs and stuccos. They represent Zoroastrian deities.

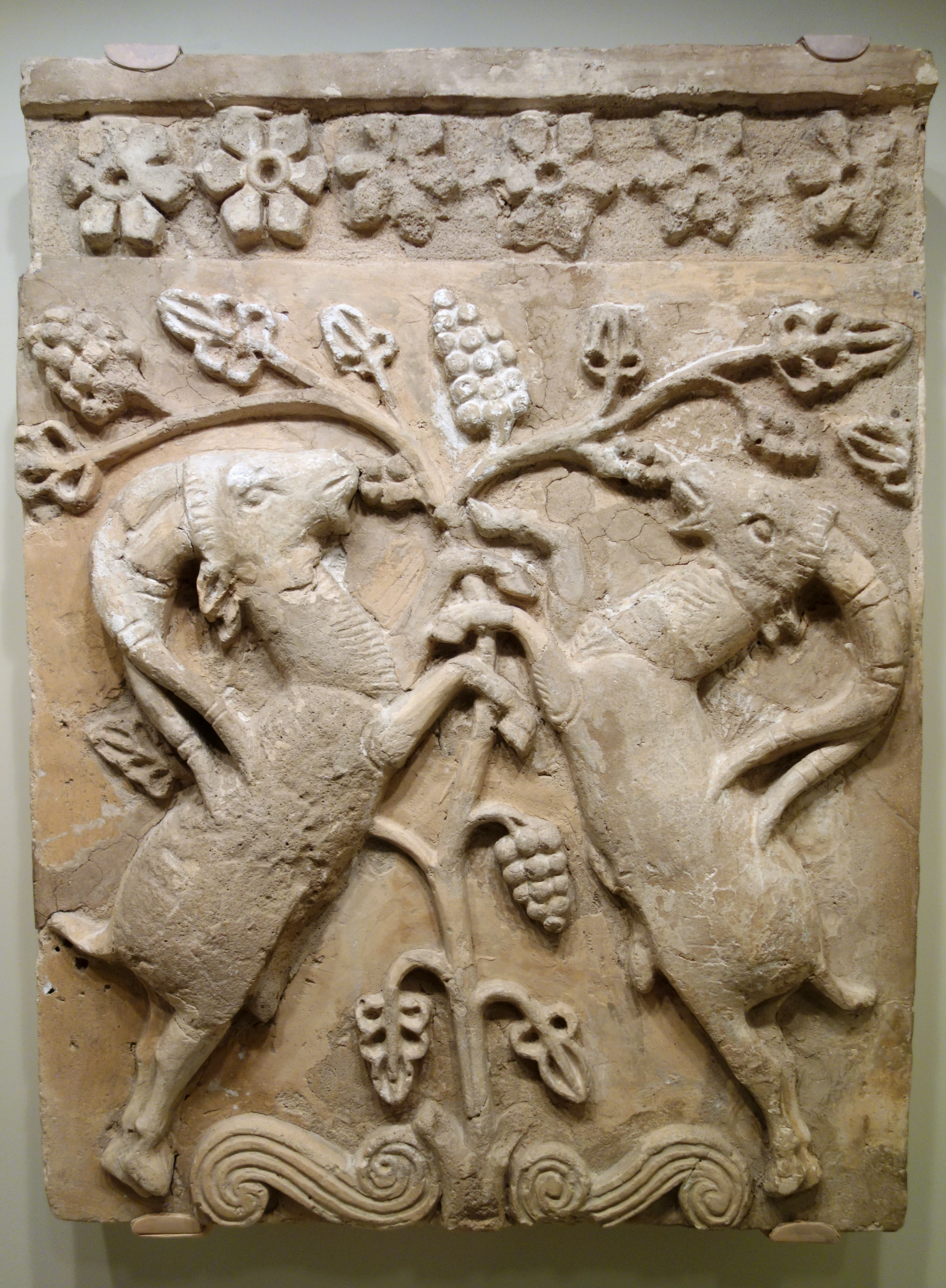
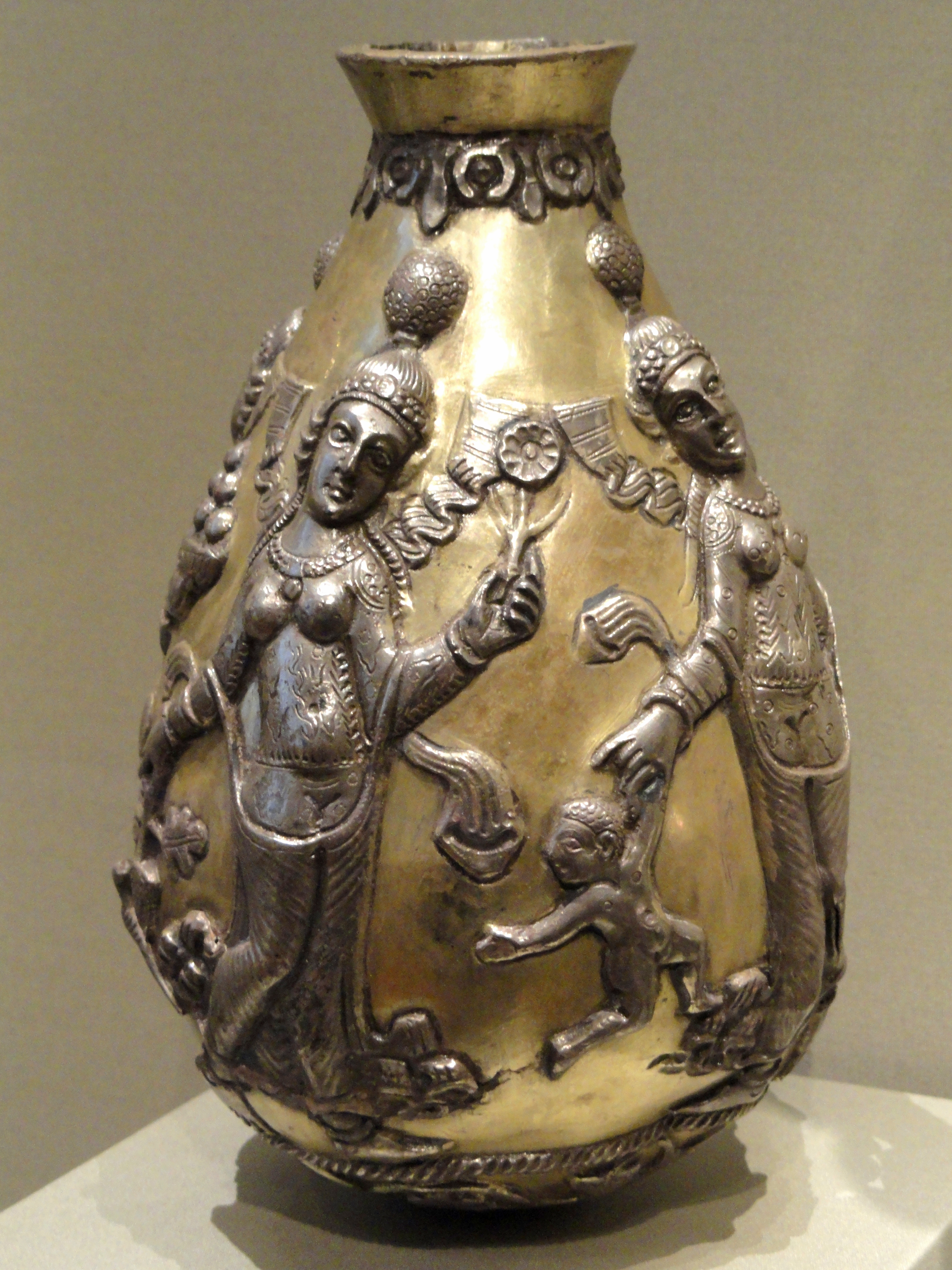
Figure	Image	Symbol of
Lotus		Farr, Anahid
Tree of life		Abundance, immortality
Grape		Blessing and fertility
Date palm		Blessing and fertility
Pomegranate		Blessing, Anahid

== Reliefs ==
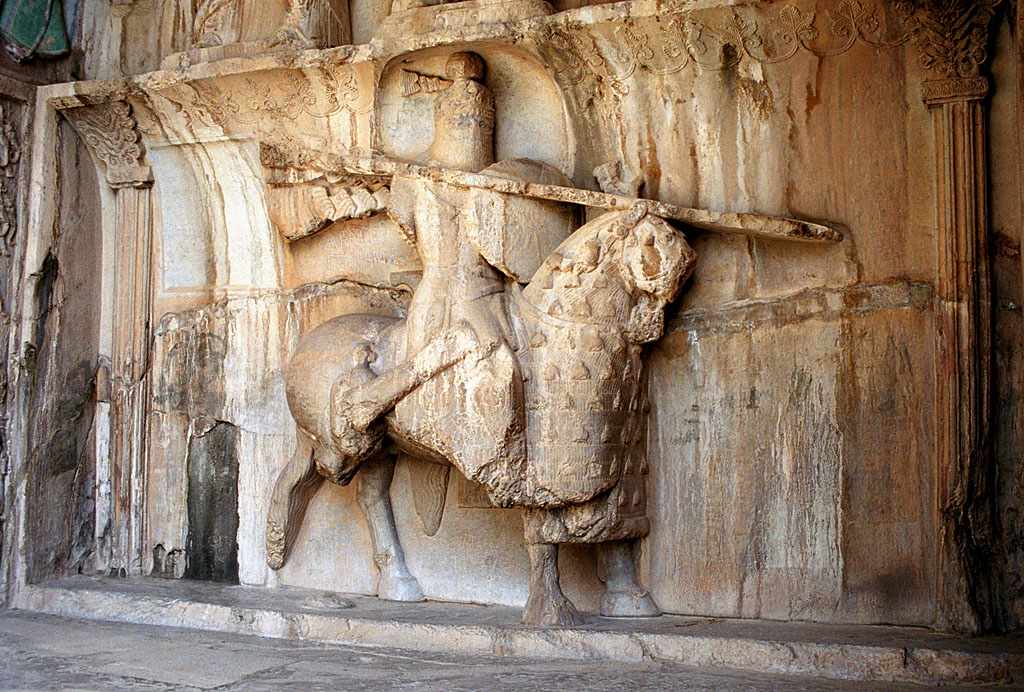
Rock relief of Khosrow II mounted on his horse Shabdiz fully armed for battle

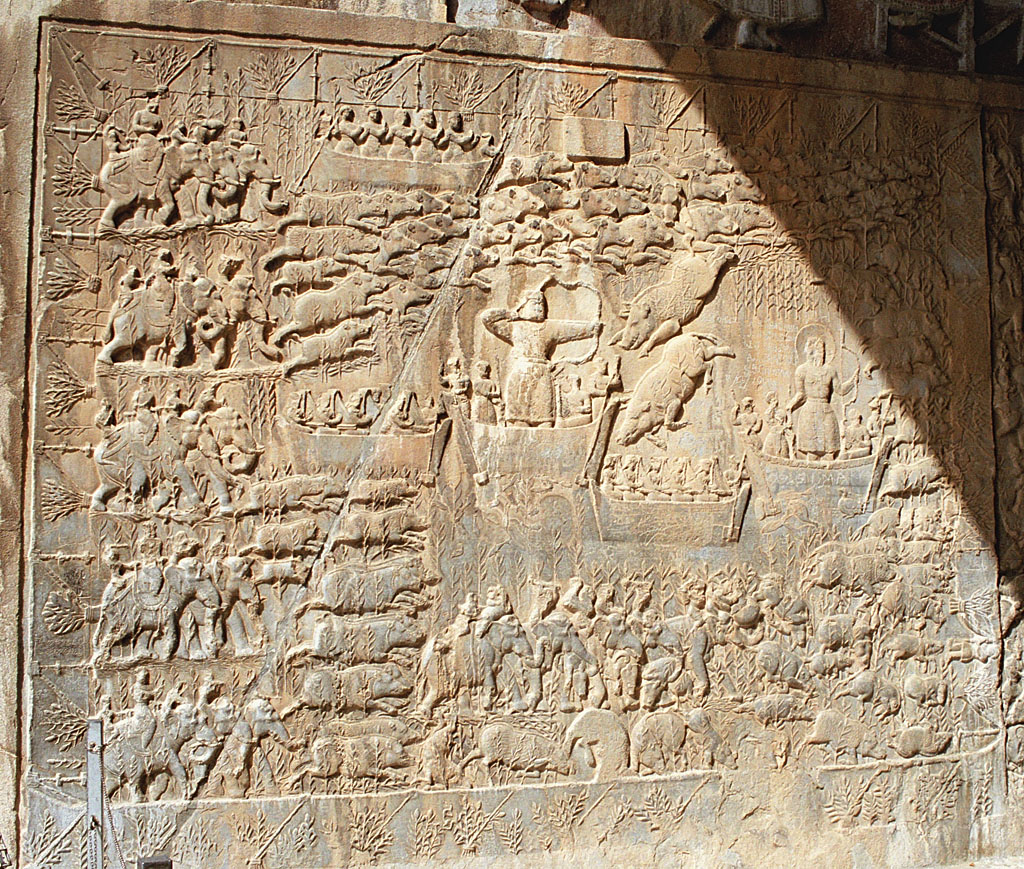
Boar hunt in Taq-e Bostan

Some of the greatest achievements are mainly a series of more than thirty rock relief monuments. They are mostly found in Fars province, which was the original province of the ruling Sassanid house. The reliefs mostly date back to between the 3rd and beginning of the 4th centuries. The reliefs depict some significant event and are usually attributed to specific rulers.

A relief at Naqsh-e Rostam is mounted below the Achaemenid royal tombs, and is therefore probably in reference to this, as a way for a monarch to likein and connect himself to the old dynasty and pay homage. Ardashir I is depicted with the god Ahura Mazda, each in strict profile and of the same size. This depicts an equality of the monarch and the god, indicating a greatness about him. The relief is modeled very strong, but is rather cautious in the presentation of details. There is evidence of Hellenistic influences in the relief.

Other reliefs, such as at Taq-e Bostan, are mounted in a rock-hewn arch. On the back wall of this there are almost fully sculpted figures. Khosrow II is illustrated on a horse in a heavy suit of armor. The scenes on the sides of this show a royal hunt. The figure of the ruler is shown in front view, his face contrast in three-quarter view. His figure is tall and dominates the whole scene, other figures, however, are shown comparatively small. The composition gives the representation of landscape and many details such as the court of the king, a rather picturesque impression and was certainly once painted.

== Stucco ==
In addition to the rock reliefs, stucco reliefs played a major role in art under the Sasanians. Since stone brick buildings were conceived as ugly, they were covered in stucco. Within these stucco walls reliefs were often carved of mainly floral patterns, but also figurative representations and especially animals. Often important state buildings, such as palaces and administrative headquearers, would have been decorated as such, often colored white.

== Paintings ==
Paintings played a substantial role in Sassanid art, although it is currently poorly documented. Mani was known to have been a painter of some fame, apparently for panel paintings or miniatures in books. Nothing of this sort remains from the period, although the tradition of the Persian miniature from some centuries later was apparently the earliest in the Islamic world.

One of the few sites where wall-paintings survived in quantity is Panjakent in modern Tajikistan, and ancient Sogdia, which was barely, if at all, under the control of the central Sasanian power. The old city was abandoned in the decades after the Muslims eventually took the city in 722 and has been extensively excavated in modern times. Large areas of wall paintings survived from the palace and private houses, which are mostly now in the Hermitage Museum or Tashkent. They covered whole rooms and were accompanied by large quantities of reliefs in wood. The subjects are similar to other Sasanian art, with enthroned kings, feasts, battles, and beautiful women, and there are illustrations of both Persian and Indian epics, as well as a complex mixture of deities. They mostly date from the 7th and 8th centuries.

In Hajjiabad, Iran, a mansion was excavated that still contained well-preserved paintings. The walls were decorated with frontal view busts. The frescos at Dura Europos, on the frontier of the Roman Empire and Sasanian Persia, are also relevant, with many figures in Persian dress. The most famous come from the Dura-Europos synagogue, and date from around 244–256; those in the Dura-Europos church may be a few years older.

At Bishapur, floor mosaics in a broadly Greco-Roman style have survived, and these were probably widespread in other elite settings, perhaps made by craftsmen from the Greek world.

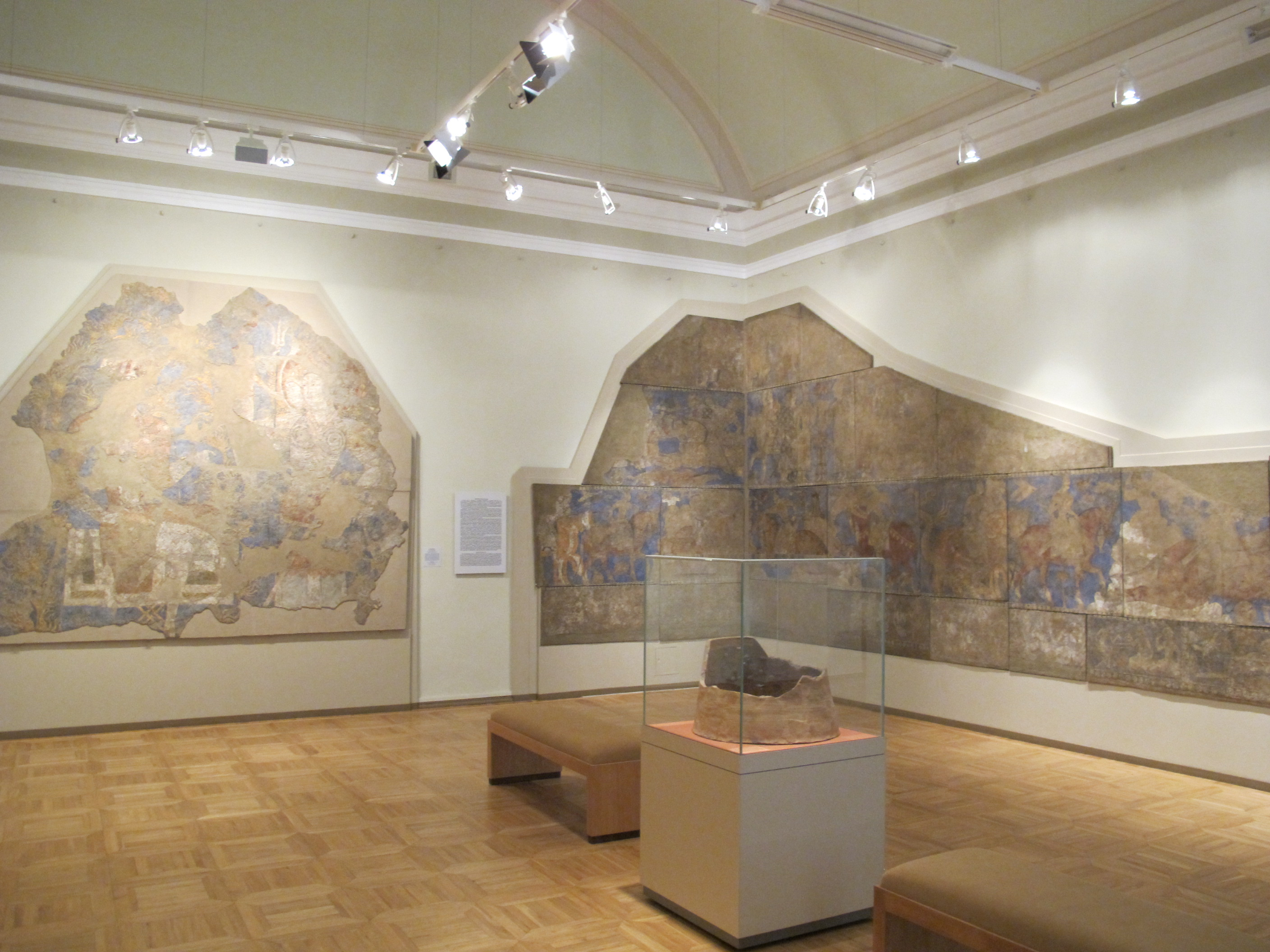
Sections of wall-paintings from Panjakent, c. 740

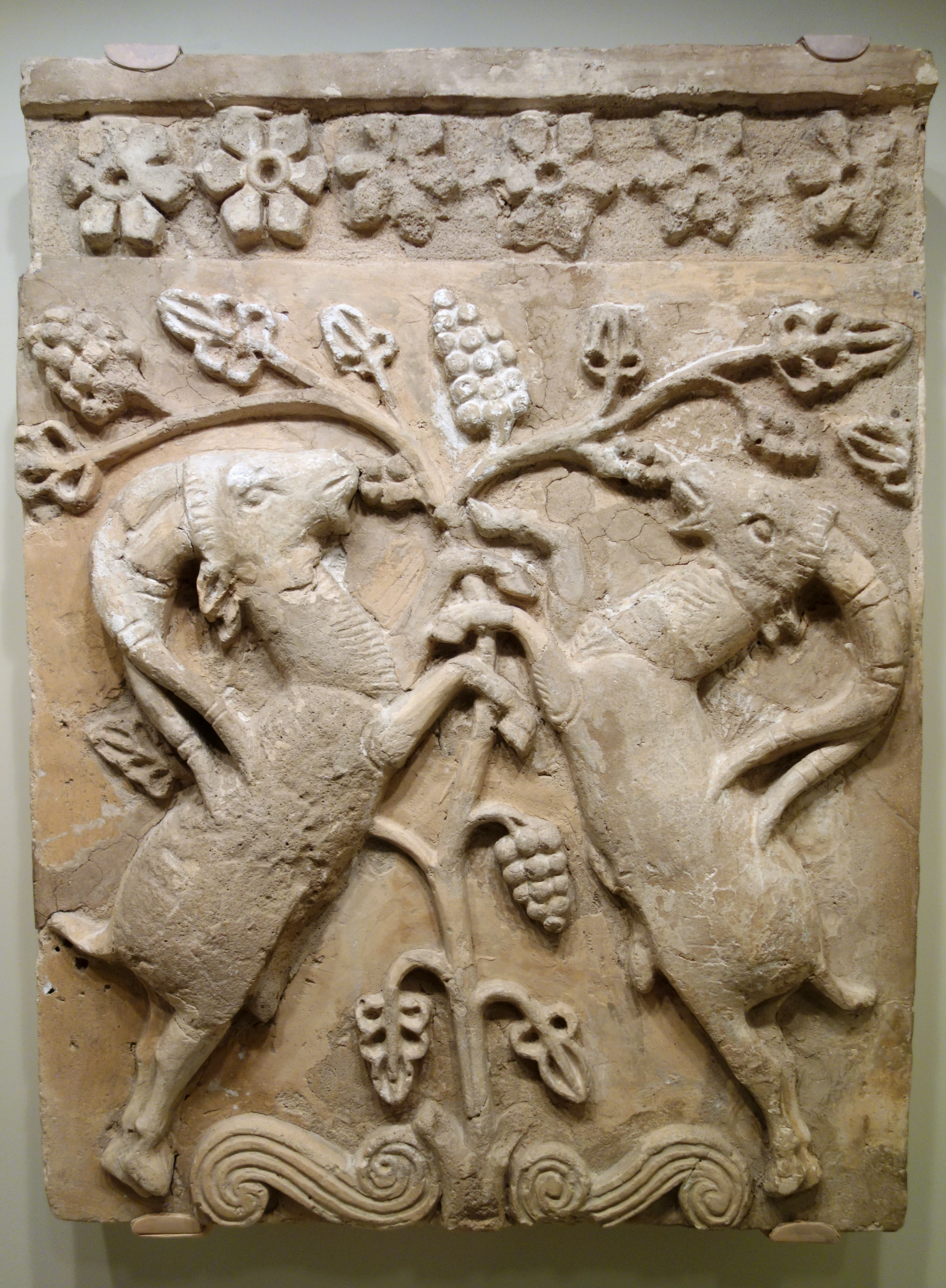
Stucco relief with confronted ibexes, 5th or 6th century, once with polychrome painting

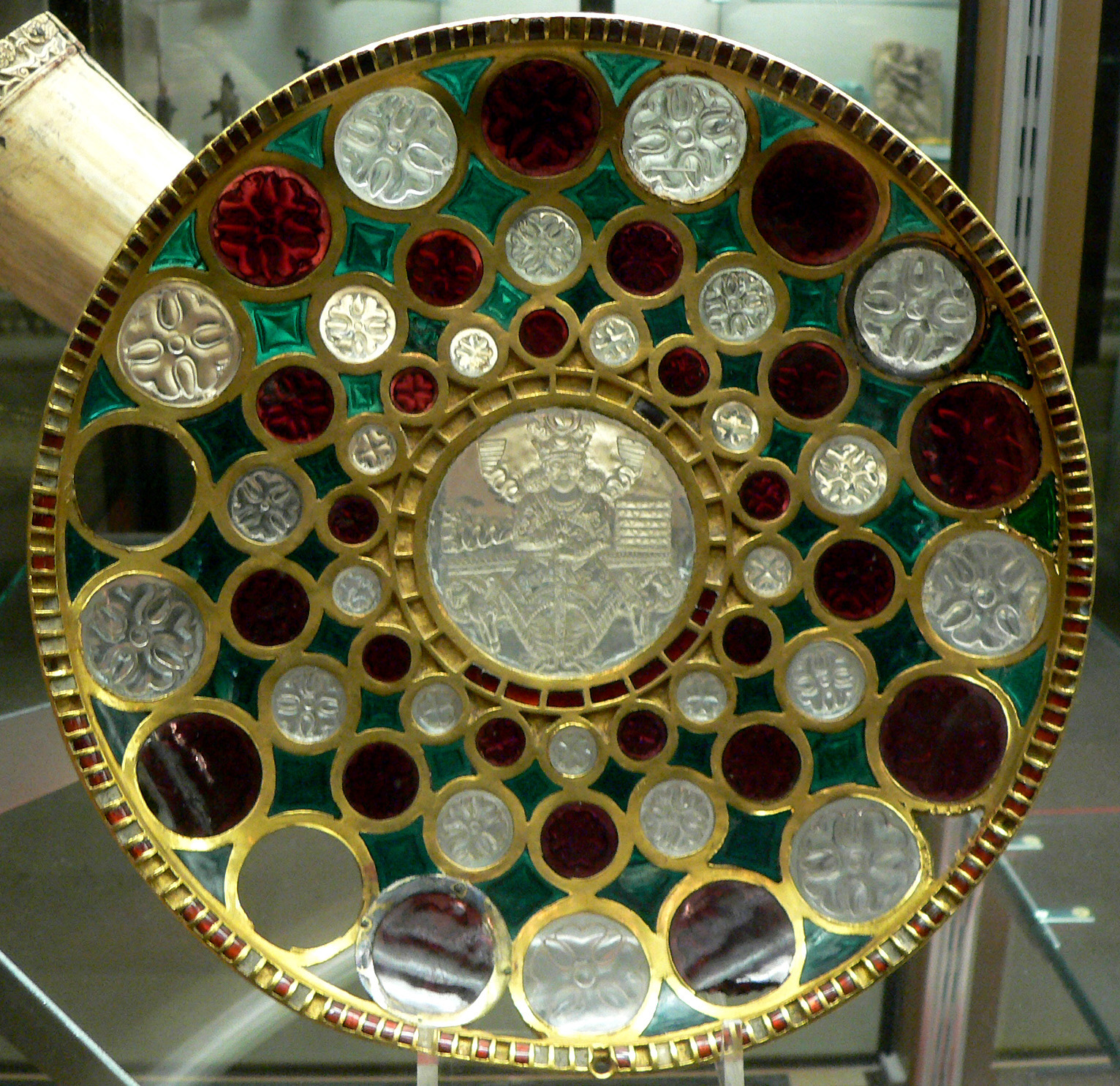
The so-called "Coupe de Chosroès", metal and carved semi-precious stone

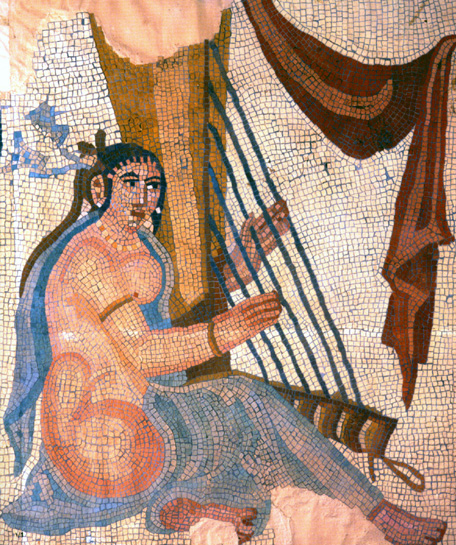
Mosaic at Bishapur of a musician playing an angular harp

== Architecture ==
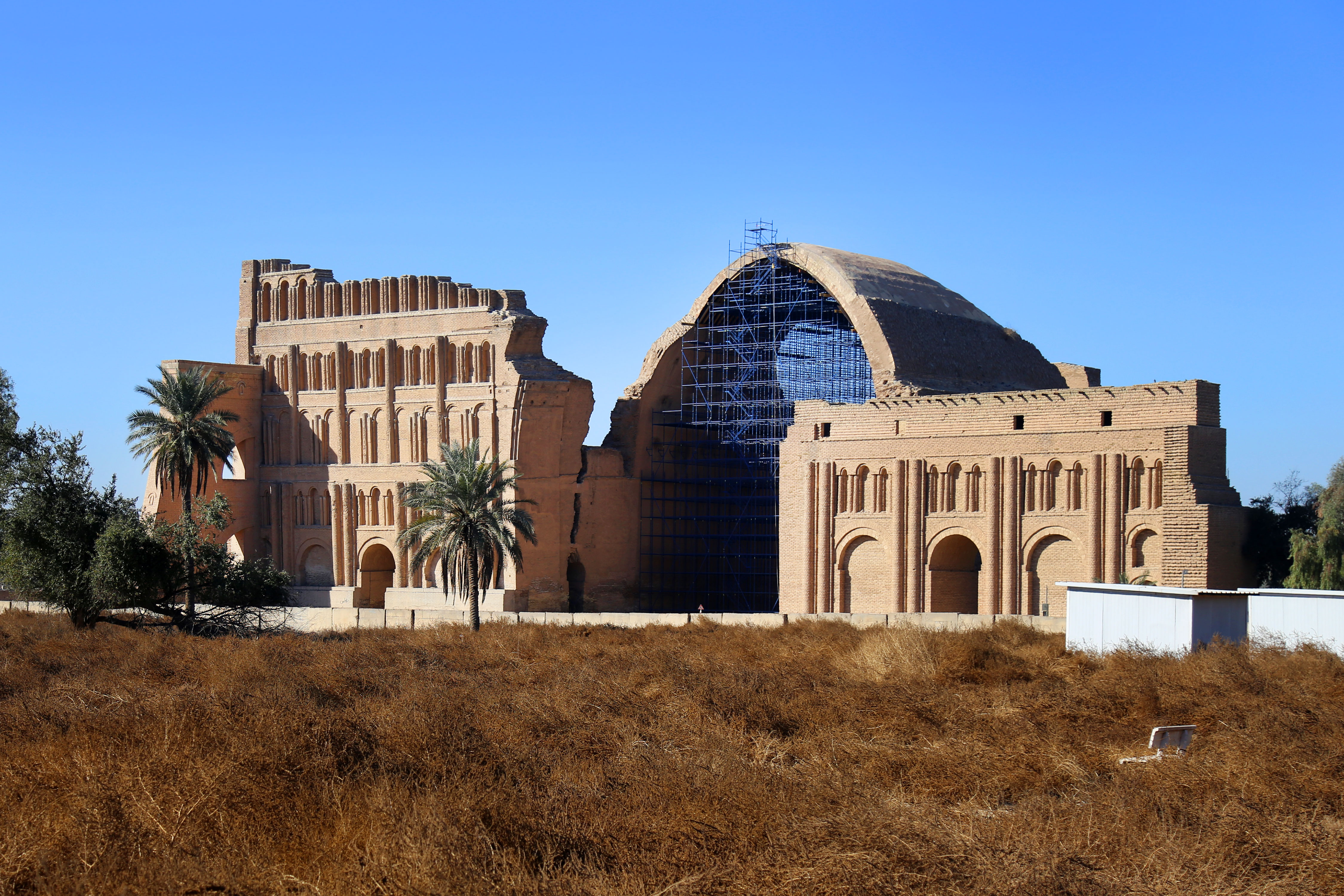
Taq Kasra at Ctesiphon

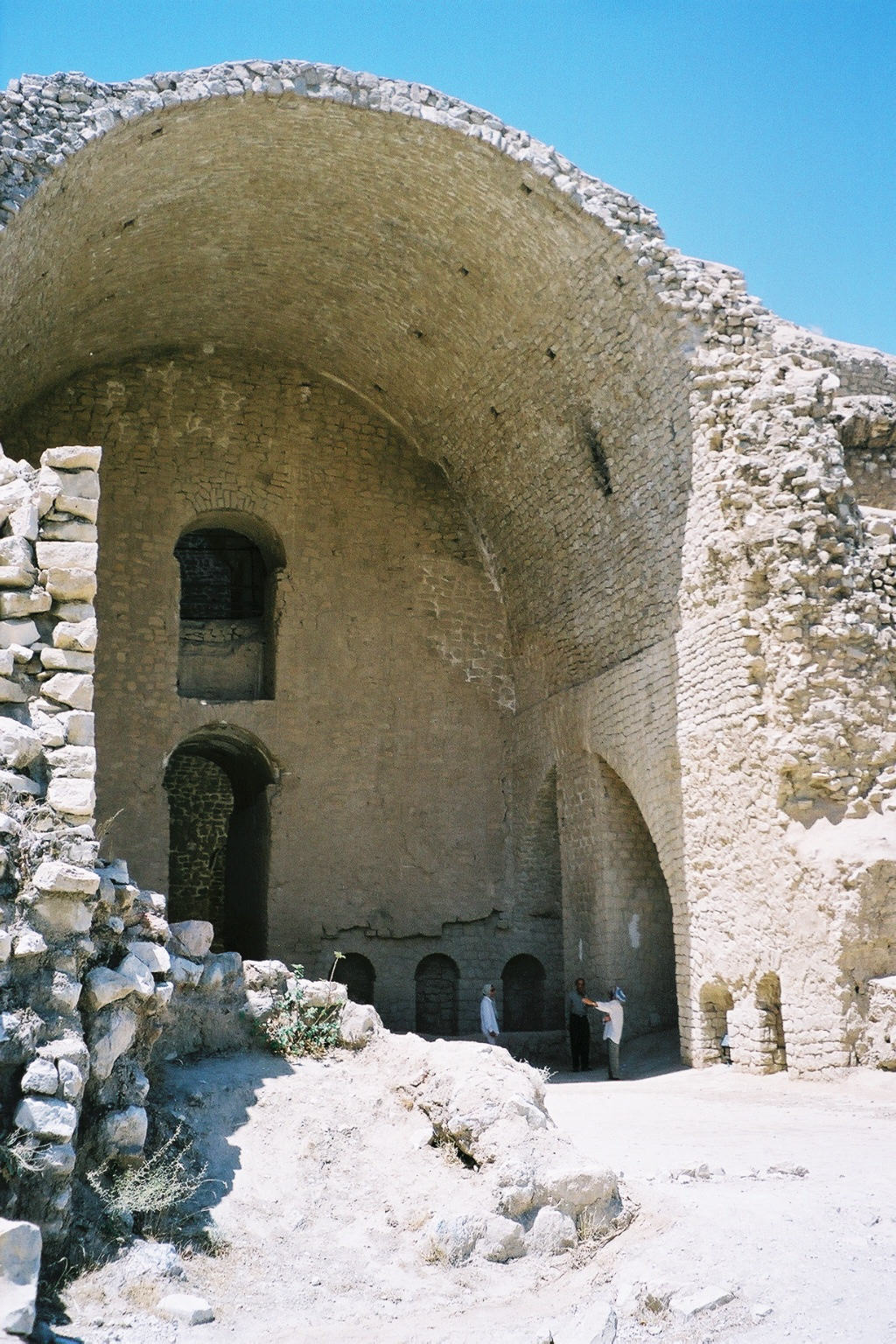
The arch of the palace at Firuzabad

The grandest buildings of Sasanian architecture were very large palaces in brick, with high vaulted halls, that were important in the development of the iwan in Islamic architecture. The Sasanians further developed the vaults and arches used by the Parthians, usually with a large opening to one side of the hall in iwan style.

Taq Kasra, the palace at Ctesiphon, is dominated by an arched hall, with much of the enormous vault still standing. The facade is elaborately articulated with columns and niches which once bore paintings and reliefs.

The Palace of Firuzabad (Iran) was built by Ardashir I. It is located on a small lake, which opens to the main arch of the structure. From that opening on both sides slightly smaller halls present are also curved. Behind the main arch is also a hall with a dome 22-meters high., with two domed rooms on either side. Behind these rooms, there is a surrounding courtyard which connects all around. The walls of the rooms are divided by niches and once had rich stucco decorations. The area around the palace was once a garden. The garden, palace, and lake were all built together and were at a time connected.

=== Urban planning ===
The Sasanians built numerous new cities with elaborate planning. Many of them are circular, mainly as a defensive tactical advantage it had during sieges. The walls of a round city could enclose with the same length of a larger area. But there were also rectangular-scale urban systems. These are usually associated with Roman architects who were abducted by the Sasanians. Although this was probably needed for the planning of these cities in the Sasanian style. Rectangular city facilities are therefore considered as an alternative Sasanian urban planning system.

Firuzabad is a settlement built under Ardashir I and a well-documented example of Sasanian urban planning. The city had a diameter of 2 km and was circular. Two roads divided them into four districts, which in turn were divided into 5 smaller sectors and thus ordered the entire city in 20 sectors. The detailed planning seems to have continued in the surrounding landscape. Bishapur and Gundeshapur, however, are conversely perpendicular cities. Bishapur seems to have been developed by Roman craftsmen, since the local palace is decorated with mosaics in the Hellenistic style.

== Coinage ==
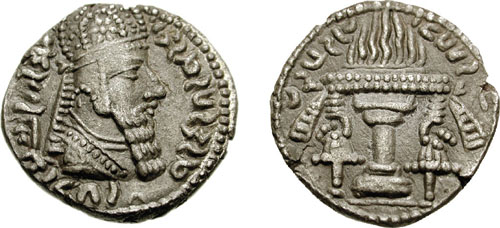
Coin with image of Ardashir I with eternal fire on lapel to the right

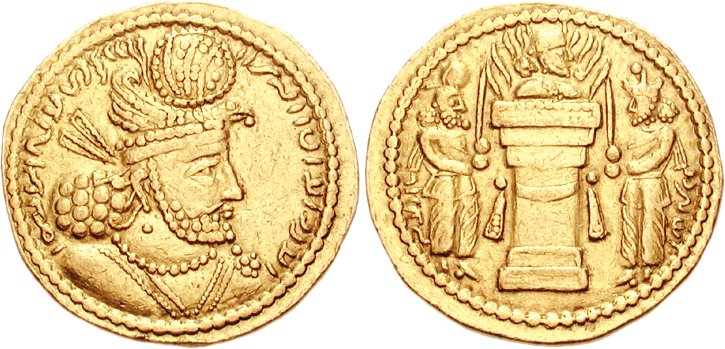
Coin of Hormizd II. Note that the Sassanid crown changes from ruler to ruler.

Sasanian coins are a particularly important source for a major reason; they are easily datable from all periods of Sasanian history. Using the name of the ruler's image on the coin in Pahlavi and it can be used to date other works of art. The front usually shows the image of the ruler, sometimes together with a son or wife, rarely with both. On the back there are several scenes, including an investiture or an altar, on which the eternal fire is burning. The tradition of these designs begins with the rather stiff image of Ardashir I (224–242), and under Shapur I (240–270). Under Shapur II (309–379), it is again made of the same material, while the detail modeling is slightly decreased. This is, however, important again later. In the following period the designs are often highly stylized and have been partially recorded.

== Arts and crafts ==
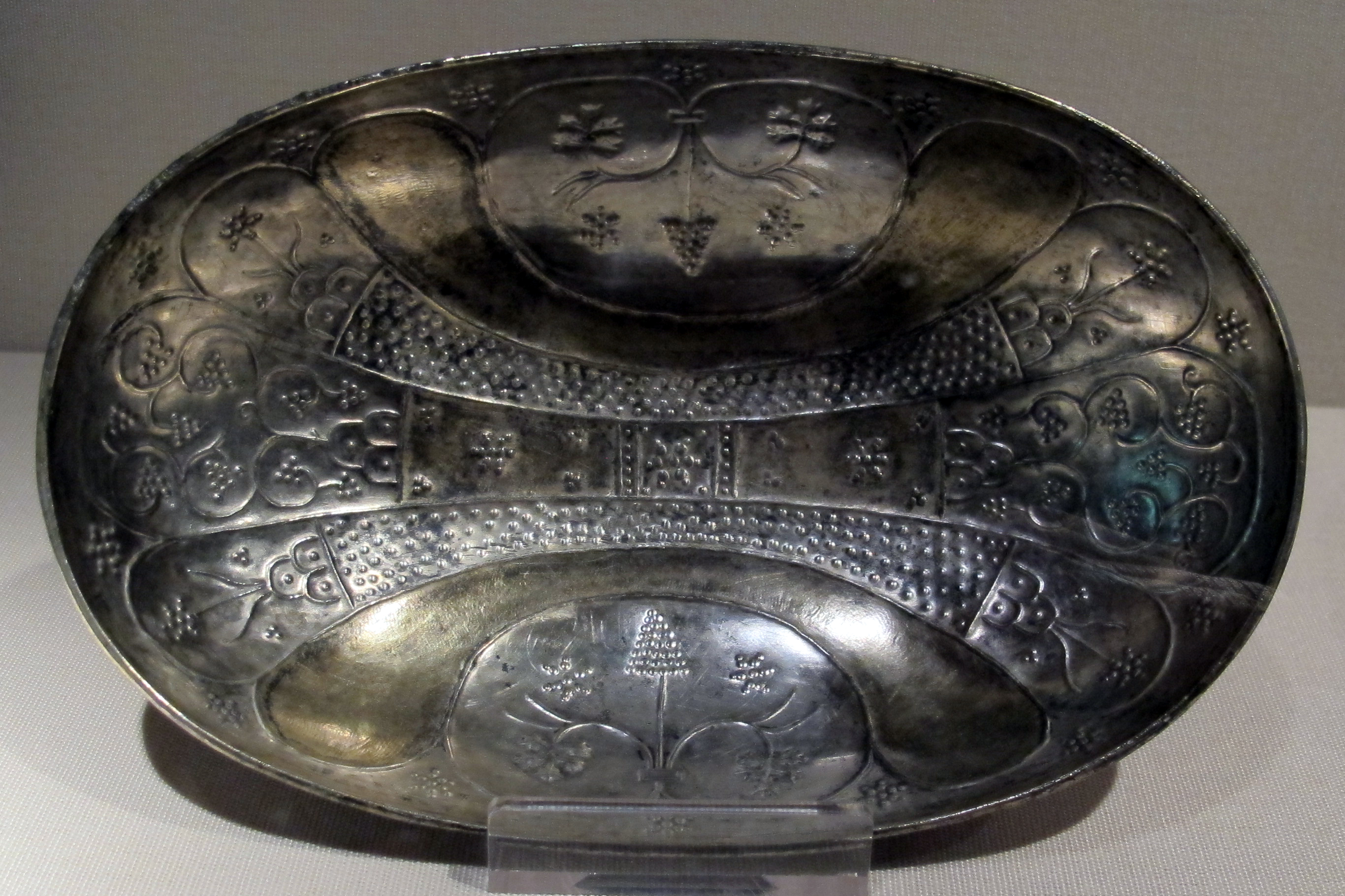
Sasanian decoration on the underside of a silver vessel, 7th century

=== Metalwork ===
A number of Sasanid silver vessels have survived, especially rather large plates or bowls used to serve food. These have high-quality engraved or embossed decoration from a courtly repertoire of mounted kings or heroes, and scenes of hunting, combat and feasting, often partially gilded. Ewers, presumably for wine, may feature dancing girls in relief. These were exported to China, and also westwards.

A special feature of Sasanian art is represented by shells of silver and gold, on the inner surface of which a scene is etched into a relief. About a hundred specimens are known of, which demonstrate the literary splendor of the court. Many come from excavations, but they are mostly chance finds. Many were found near the Ural Mountains in Russia and were likely traded in this area. The original purpose, function and authority of these shells therefore remains in the dark. Often, a ruler is shown at the hunt. He usually sits on a horse that moves in a flying gallop. He stands with his sword pointed at a dangerous animal such as a boar or lion or shooting a bow and arrow. The face often appears in three-quarter view.

There are also some peaceful representations that occur, such as depictions of animals and legendary creatures. Earlier versions of the silver shell bowls usually depict a monarch in full relief, dominating the entire shell. Later, however, in the 4th and 5th centuries the focal character of the shell shares space with a smaller secondary character or element.

Another group of metal goods are present; richly decorated vessels whose shape may have been adopted from the customs of the Mediterranean.

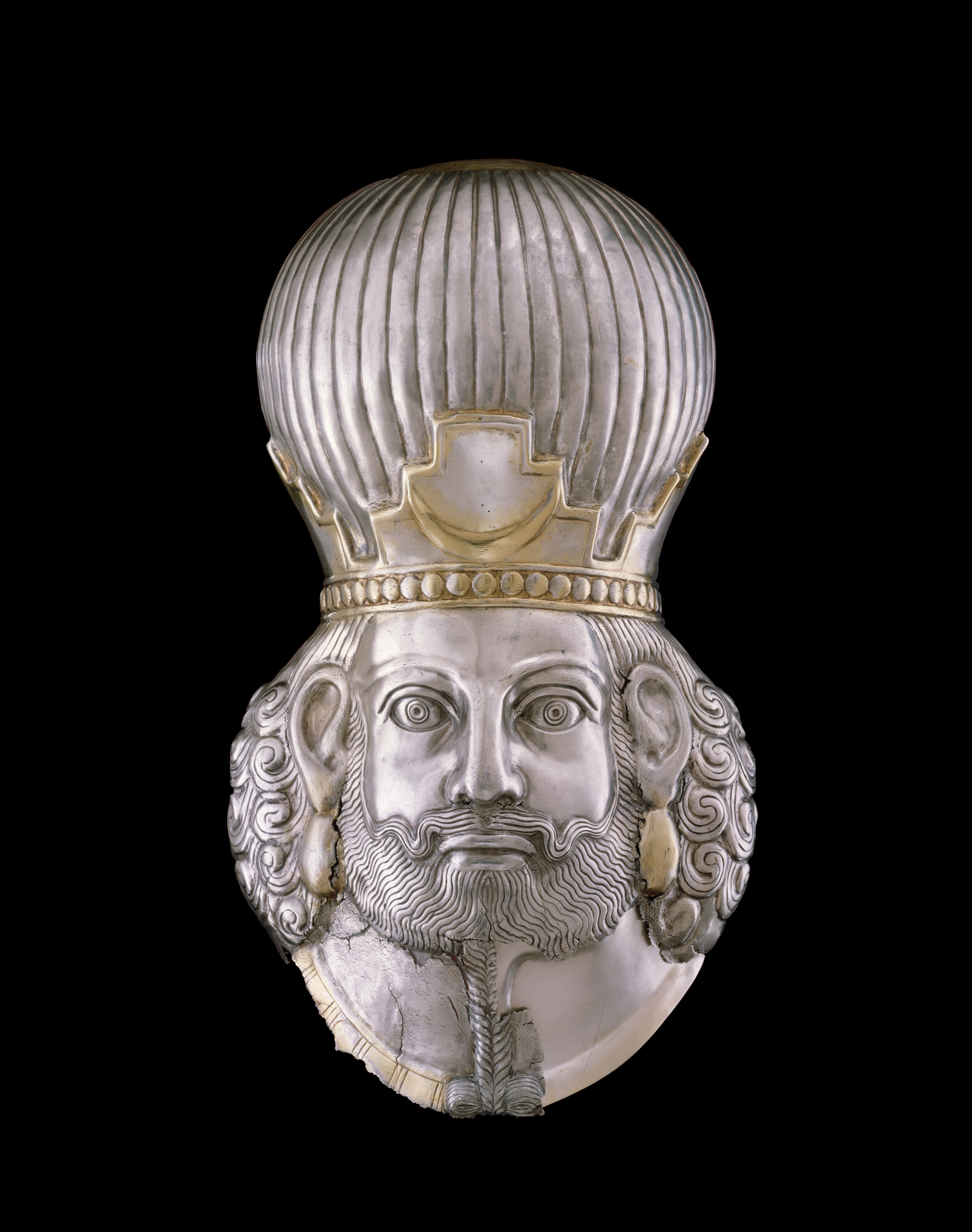
Silver-gilt head of a king, 4th century

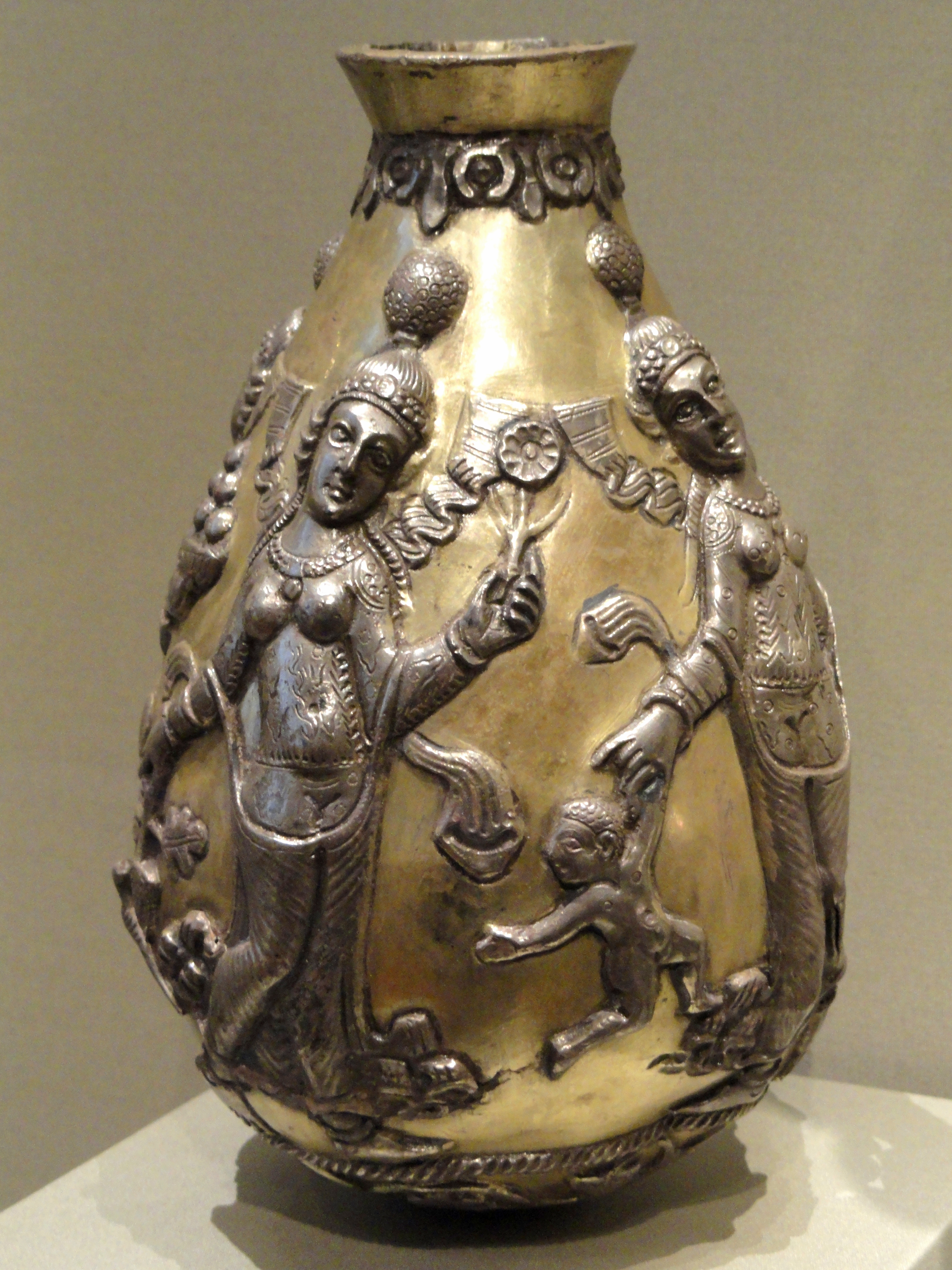
The "Anahita Vessel", c. 300–500, gilted silver: the female dancers may be Zoroastrian religious images or bacchantes, followers of the cult of the wine god Bacchus

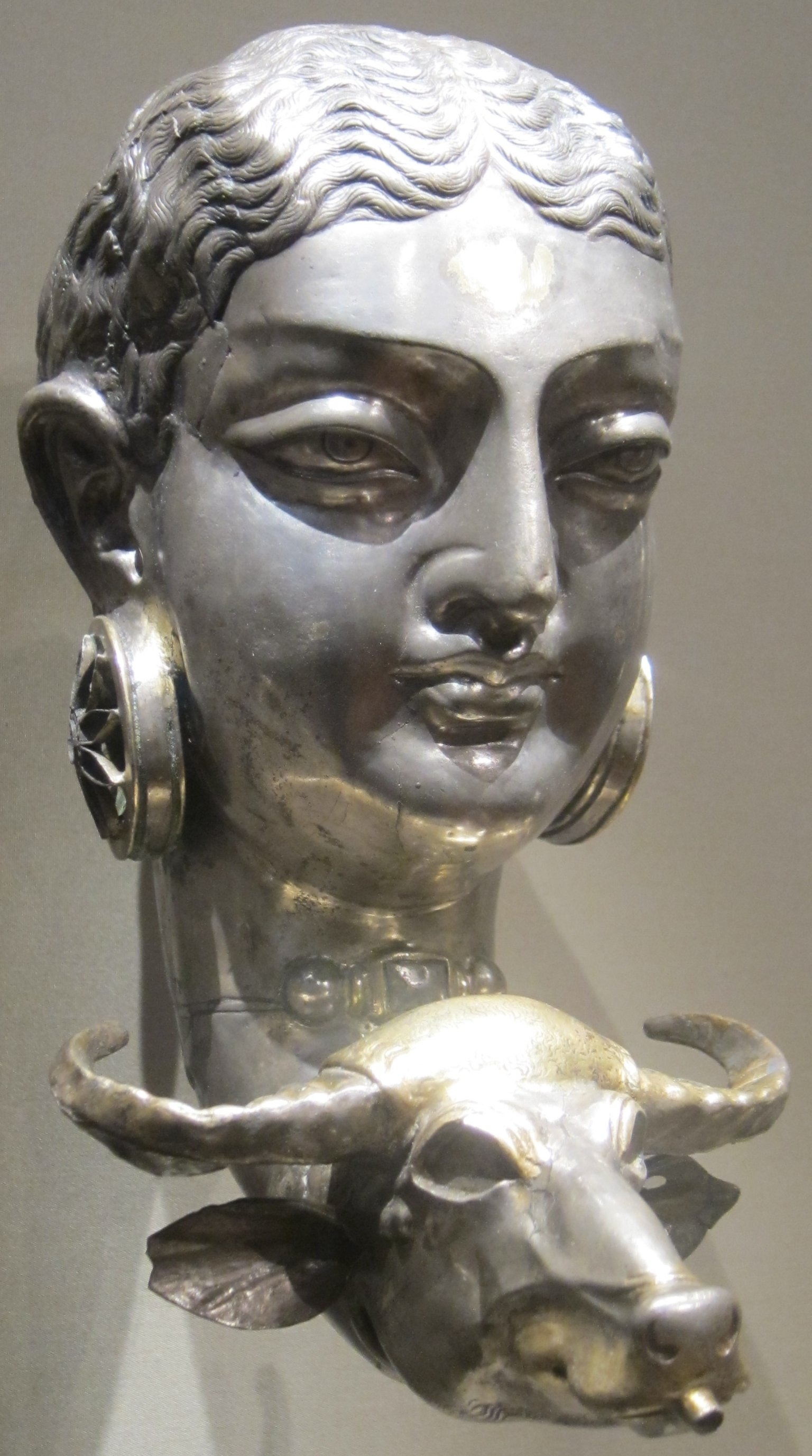
Rhyton with female head and water buffalo, c. 600–700, silver

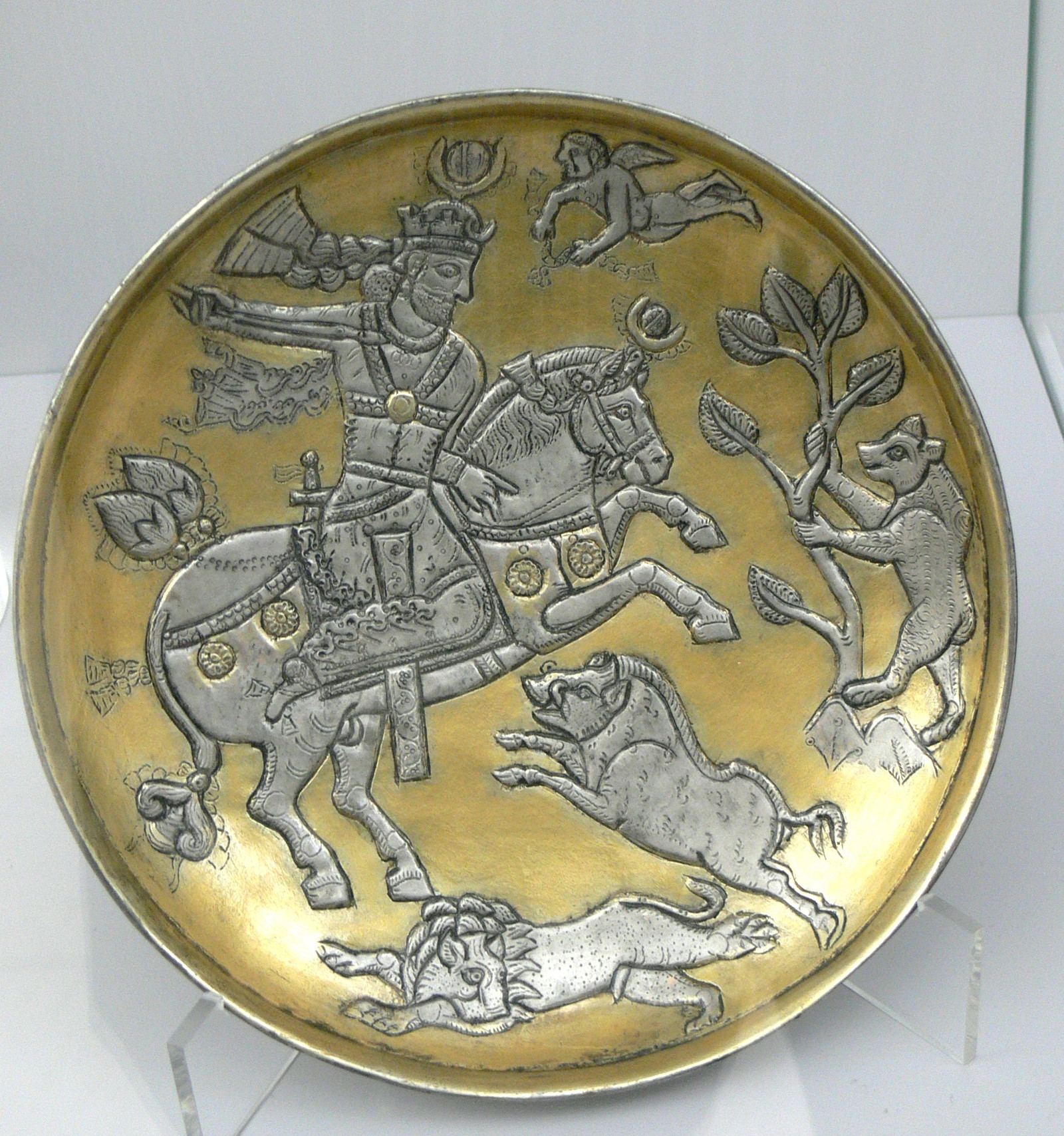
Silver partly gilded dish with the favourite subject of the king hunting, 7th century

=== Textiles ===
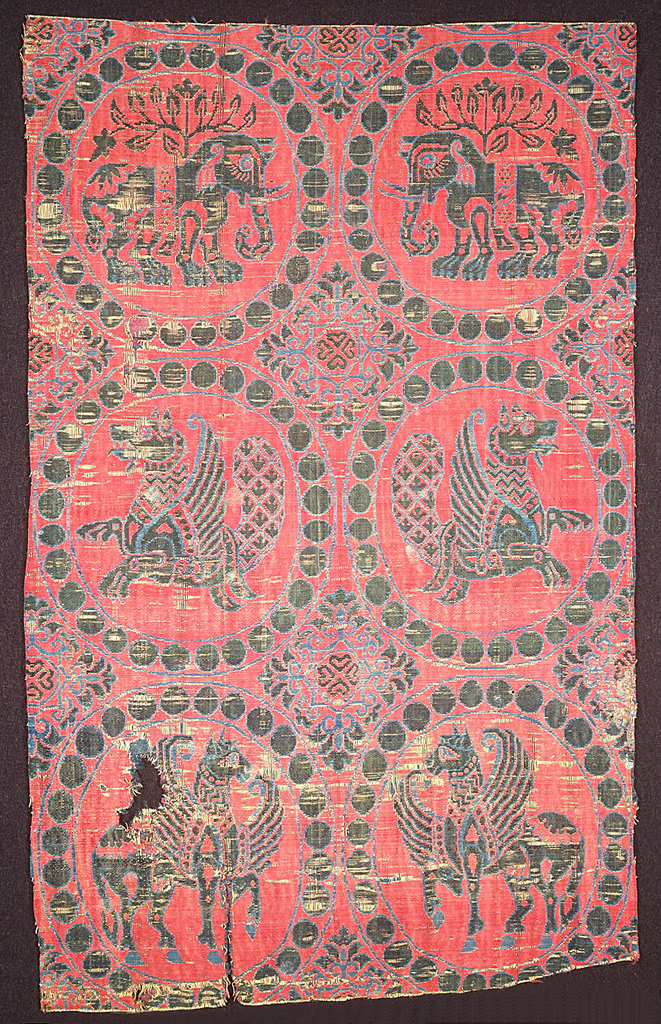
A textile from Islamic Spain with Sasanian elements: elephants, simurgh, and winged horses, within pearl roundels

Carpets evidently could reach a high level of sophistication, as the praise lavished on the lost royal Baharestan Carpet by the Muslim conquerors shows. But the only surviving fragments that might originate from Sasanid Persia are humbler productions, probably made by nomad tribes. Sasanid textiles were famous, and fragments have survived, mostly with designs based on animals in compartments, in a long-lasting style.

There are indications that especially colorful decorated fabrics had a special importance under the Sassanids. However, the assessment of this art form presents many difficulties for the research, as there are few textiles that date back to the Sassanid Empire itself and the findings outside the empire (e.g. in Egypt) are not always of clear origin, if it was imported from the Sassanids or their own imitations or creations. Especially when the textiles are decorated with heraldic animal patterns, a Sassanid origin is usually assumed. Typical are peacocks, rams and other animals that are arranged singly or in pairs within a rosette. The ram was the god of war in connection to Verethragna and therefore held a particular popularity in the Sasanian arts as a motif for textiles.

=== Glass ===
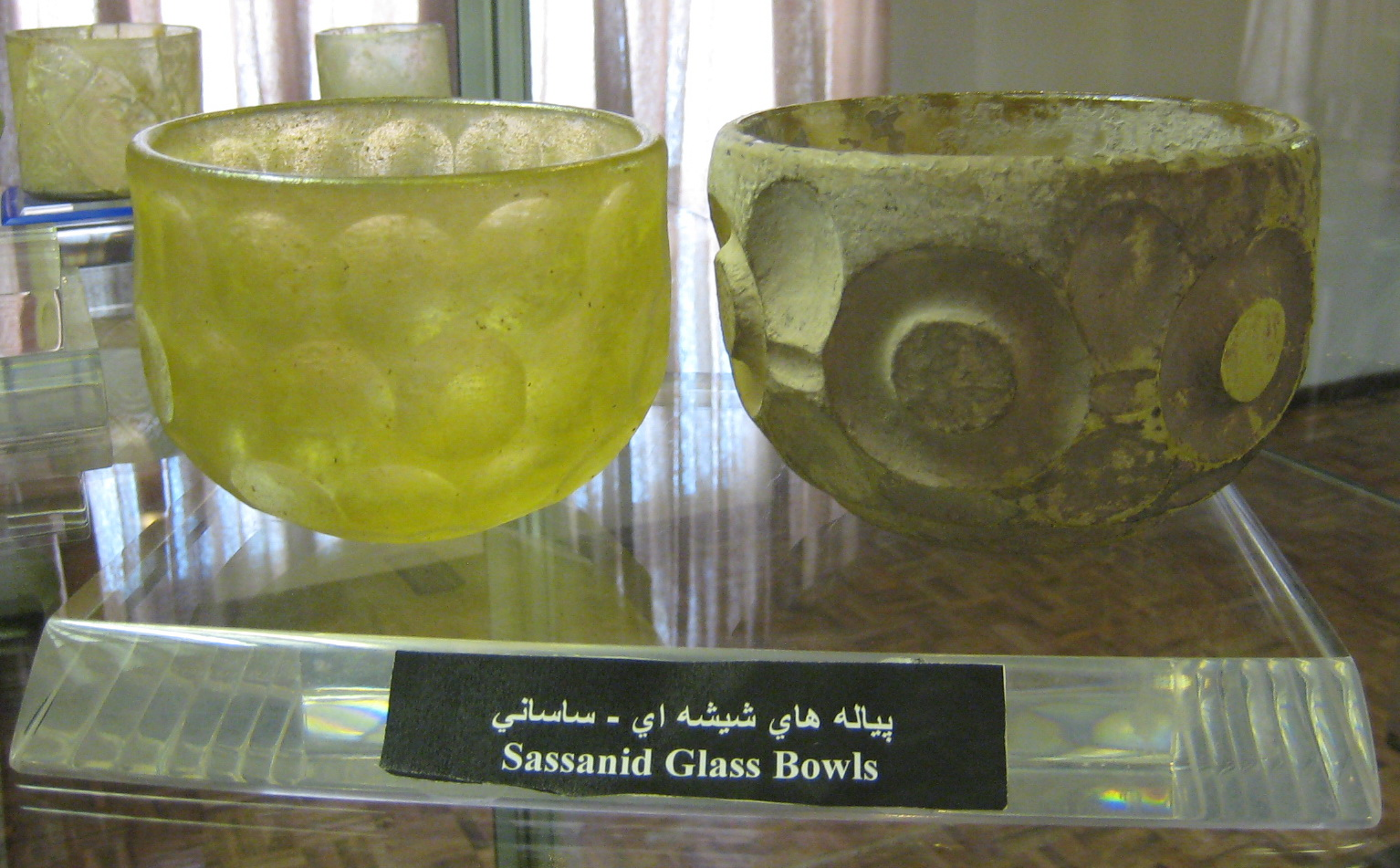
Sassanid glass bowls

Sasanian glass continued and developed Roman glass technology. In simpler forms it seems to have been available to a wide range of the population, and was a popular luxury export to Byzantium and China, even appearing in elite burials from the period in Japan. Technically, it is a silica-soda-lime glass production characterized by thick glass-blown vessels relatively sober in decoration, avoiding plain colours in favour of transparency and with vessels worked in one piece without over- elaborate amendments. Thus the decoration usually consists of solid and visual motifs from the mould (reliefs), with ribbed and deeply cut facets, although other techniques like trailing and applied motifs were practised. Sasanian pottery does not seem to have been used by the elites, and is mostly utilitarian.

== Influence ==
Sasanian art had a strong influence on the Islamic art of Persia and the wider Islamic world. Arches are one of the most characteristic elements of Persian architecture. Especially in Central Asia, such as Sogdiana the methods and customs of art are directly attributable to the Sasanians.

Sasanian influences are found in medieval Byzantine textiles, jewelry, and architectural sculpture. A notable example of Sasanian-influenced decorative motifs can be found in the fifth- and sixth-century floor mosaics of Antioch. Sasanian motifs did not appear before the fifth century in Roman-Byzantine art, but the impact was long-lived.

It was mainly through textiles that heraldric motifs spread, although some mosaics as early as the 6th century from Antioch depicted the same motifs.

== See also ==
- Byzantine art
- Parthian art
- Sasanian architecture
- Roman art

== Literature ==
- Canepa, Matthew P., "Topographies of Power, Theorizing the Visual, Spatial and Ritual Contexts of Rock Reliefs in Ancient Iran", in Harmanşah (2014), google books
- Cotterell, Arthur (ed), The Penguin Encyclopedia of Classical Civilizations, 1993, Penguin, ISBN 0670826995
- Kurt Erdmann: The Art of Iran in the Time of the Sassanids. Berlin 1943, 1969
- G. Reza Garosi: The Colossal Statue of Shapur I in the style of Sasanian Sculpture. Verlag Philipp von Zabern, Mainz 2009, ISBN 978-3-8053-4112-7
- Roman Ghirshman: Iran. Parthian and Sassanid. Munich 1962 (orig. London 1962)
- Harper, P.O., "History of Art in Iran, v. Sasanian", 1986–2011, Encyclopedia Iranica
- Prudence Oliver Harper: In search of a cultural identity: monuments and artifacts of the Sasanian Near East, 3rd to 7th century A.D. New York 2006
- Herrmann, G, and Curtis, V.S., "Sasanian Rock Reliefs", Encyclopaedia Iranica, 2002, Online text
- Keall, Edward J., "Bīšāpūr", 1989, Encyclopedia Iranica
- Luschey, Heinz, "Bisotun ii. Archeology", Encyclopaedia Iranica, 2013, Online text
