= Shabdiz =

Legendary stallion of Khosrau Parvez

Shabdiz (شبديز)
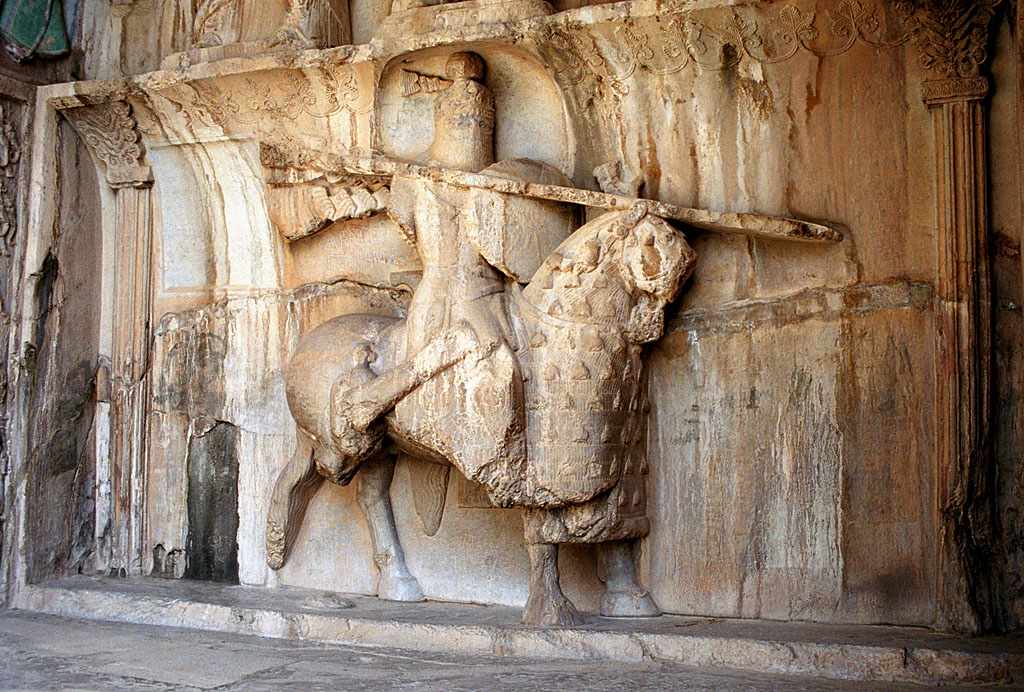
- Relief of a victorious Khosrow II mounted on Shabdiz; Taq-i Bostan
- Species: Horse
- Sex: Male
- Nationality: Sasanian
- Owner: Khosrau II
- Appearance: black

Shabdiz (Persian: شبديز Shabdēz, lit. "night-colored", "black") was the legendary black stallion of Khosrau Parvez, one of the most famed Sassanid Persian kings (reigned 590 to 628CE). Shabdiz, meaning "midnight", was reputedly the "world's fastest horse" according to ancient Persian literature. In Nizami's romantic epic Khosrau and Shirin, it is Khosrau's 'beloved' Shabdiz that whisks his future bride, Shirin, to meet him after Shirin has fallen in love with Khosrau's portrait. A musician, Barbad, through a song - potentially risking his life - informed the king of Shabdiz's death.
