= Colossal statue of Shapur I =

Monumental statue of Shapur I in Fars Province, Iran

Statue of Shapur I the Great پیکره شاپور بزرگ

- Location within Iran
- 29°46′40″N 51°34′15″E
- Location: Kazerun, Fars, Iran

Iran National Heritage List
- Official name: Statue of Shapur I
- Type: Statue
- Designated: 1932
- Reference no.: 159
- Conservation organization: Cultural Heritage, Handicrafts and Tourism Organization of Iran

The colossal statue of Shapur I (Persian: پیکره شاپور یکم) is a monumental sculpture depicting Shapur I (r. AD 240 – 270), the second shah (king) of the Sasanian Empire, carved from a single stalagmite. It stands in the Shapur cave, a huge limestone cave located about 6 km from the ancient city of Bishapur in southern Iran.

The statue had lain collapsed on the cave floor for several centuries until 1957 when Mohammad Reza Pahlavi, the last Shah of Iran, commissioned a team of Iranian military personnel to re-erect it and repair the broken feet with iron and cement. The restoration project, which included building roads from Bishapur to the cave, mountain paths, stairs and safety railings, took six months to complete between 1957 and 1958.

The statue is positioned approximately 35 m from the cave entrance on the fourth of five terraces, about 3.4 m below the entrance level. Standing 6.7 m tall with a breadth across the shoulders of more than 2 m, it represents one of the most impressive sculptures from the Sasanian era.

== Characteristic features of the colossal statue ==
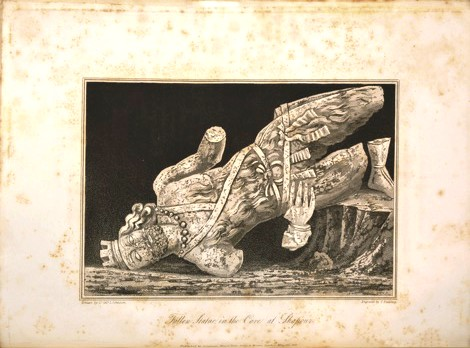
Fallen statue of Shapur I, 1817

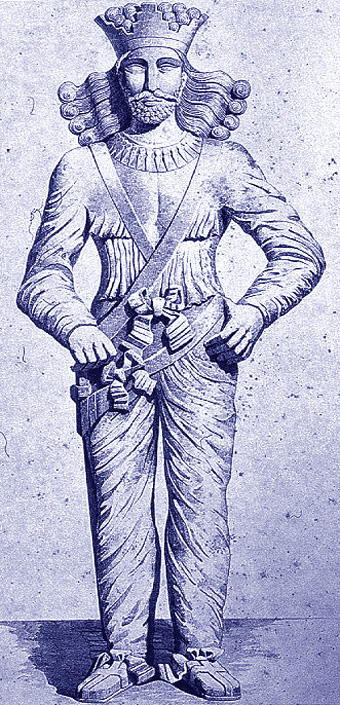
A reconstruction by George Rawlinson, 1876

The monumental sculpture is chiseled from a huge stalagmite grown in situ, but it no longer stands exactly in its original position. After its fall (probably caused by an earthquake), the sculpture was raised onto two concrete pillars, which are located near the original feet. The head and the body of the sculpture have remained quite well preserved while parts of its arms and almost all of both legs are missing.

The colossal statue is rich in detail. It is chiseled on every side with the same amount of extraordinary care and attention. The king wears a crenellated crown. A large piece of the front crenellation is missing, while the crenellations of both sides and the rear are well preserved. At the lower end of the crown, there is a wide diadem. The two bands of the diadem fall heavily down the back to the waist and widen from top to bottom. Around twenty horizontal, parallel furrows cross on these bands. The head of the sculpture has been carved out in all its particulars symmetrically. The hairstyle of the colossal statue shows a high degree of sculptural definition. The mass of hair on the left side of the sculpture has remained intact while the ends of strands of hair on the right side are broken off. Of the left arm of the sculpture, only half remains. The missing left hand of the sculpture must have once rested on the sword handle. The right arm is broken off just below the axilla. A small part of the right underarm is still attached. The right hand is strongly weathered and rests on the waist.

The clothing of the colossal statue consists of three pieces: an undervest, an upper garment and wide trousers. The upper garment of the sculpture fits tightly to the body and appears to be made of a sheer fabric. Through its skin-tight fit, the shoulders, the upper arms and the chest of the king have been emphasized. The sculpted ornaments on the upper garment are quite remarkable insofar as they resemble flames flickering downward. These are varyingly long, shaped in several different ways and irregularly arranged. At the waist, the upper garment is held together tightly by a belt while a second belt, which is hanging loosely around the hips, functions to fasten on the sword scabbard.

Only small parts of the legs of the sculpture have remained. The small remaining piece of the left thigh supports a conclusion that the ruler was wearing fluted trousers. The fact that the trousers of Shapur I originally reached the ground is evident from the traces of folds encircling the original feet of the sculpture at irregular intervals. It stands to reason that the sculptor designed the length of the trousers not only for aesthetical reasons but also to increase the sculpture's stability. The long trousers would have functioned to enlarge contact area with the ground and to spread the stress of the colossal statue, which weighs several tonnes.

The two feet of the sculpture are slightly spread. The left foot is lying a little ahead of the right foot. The original shoes of the colossal statue now have a contrasting conservation status. The right shoe is largely destroyed. The left shoe is virtually intact and has a round toe cap. The broad shoelaces, pleated lengthways, meander in an S-shape onto the ground.

On the colossal statue of Shapur I, there are three pieces of jewellery: a necklace, earrings made of large pearls and an armlet on the right wrist.

== Identification of the statue ==
In the Sasanian era, the crowns' details were subject to stringent regulations and varied from one king to another. Each Sasanian king possessed his own crown, designed at the time of his accession to power. Because of the shape of the crown (diadem, the crenellated part and korymbos) and on the basis of art historical considerations, the colossal statue can be clearly identified as Shapur I, the second Sasanian king.

== Reconstruction of the crown ==
Shapur I is not always shown wearing a crenellated crown, but he is never represented with a crenellated crown without a korymbos. A korymbos, or globular-shaped structure, sat originally on the top of the crown of the sculpture standing in the cave. The presence of a borehole on the vertex indicates that the korymbos could not have been of stone, but consisted of metal. The korymbos of the colossal statue was originally 1.5 m high and 1 m wide. After research and experimentation at the University of Basel, it was found that a korymbos of metal of a suitable size would have weighed more than a tonne even with a very low wall thickness.

== Hairstyle as an important criterion for dating the statue ==
Below the diadem, the hair springs thickly up. There are four rows of strands that are very clearly distinguishable from each other and lying in waves on top of each other, on both sides of the face. The wave patterns of the individual strands are almost identical, but at their tips, the heavily stylized, nearly spherical curls differ. The end of the top strand is rolled up on each side of the head like a snail. The underlying strands have differing forms of braided knots at their ends. The wavy strands billow out on each side across the shoulders with the curl of the lowest and shortest strand lying on the shoulder.

This kind of hairstyle can be only seen on those rock reliefs of Shapur I that were carved after 260 AD and is, therefore, the most important criterion for the precise dating of the colossal statue of Shapur I. Due to the details of the hairstyle, G. Reza Garosi succeeded to date the colossal statue exactly in the second half of the sixties of third century AD.

== Sculptor ==
The anonymous sculptor of the colossal statue of Shapur I must be considered one of the greatest sculptors in the ancient Near East. It is certain that he succeeded in finishing the colossal statue. According to post-Sasanian reports, the sculpture, which weighed several tonnes, stood on its own feet at least until the 14th century AD. An adept sculptor was not the only master for creating this sculpture – a skilled metalsmith was also involved in this work. The metalsmith was responsible for making the korymbos of metal and had to fix it firmly onto the crown of the colossal statue. The addition of a metal korymbos was indeed an innovation and is not known from any other statue in the ancient Near East. In the Sasanian era, no other statues with similar dimensions have been discovered. Thus, the colossal statue of Shapur I must be considered as an absolute exception in the history of Sasanian sculptural art.

== Fall and restoration ==
The colossal statue most likely collapsed due to earthquake damage occurring between the 15th and 19th centuries. The Fars region sits within the seismically active Zagros fold-and-thrust belt, near the Kazerun Fault system, which has historically generated large earthquakes capable of toppling massive stone monuments. Archaeological analysis of the damage patterns—including the statue's collapse as a single unit with complete arm separation and differential preservation—are consistent with seismic shearing forces rather than deliberate destruction.

The statue's construction from a single massive stalagmite within the cave made it particularly vulnerable to ground acceleration during seismic events. Regional archaeoseismological studies document multiple earthquake impacts at ancient Bishapur throughout history, with the area experiencing significant earthquakes approximately every decade.

The statue remained fallen on the cave floor until 1957, when Mohammad Reza Pahlavi commissioned its restoration. The six-month project involved a team of Iranian military personnel who carefully re-erected the sculpture using two concrete pillars positioned near the original feet. The restoration team also repaired the damaged feet using iron reinforcement and cement, and constructed access roads, mountain paths, stairs, and safety railings to facilitate visitor access to the cave. The restoration work was completed in 1958, and a commemorative inscription documenting the Imperial Iranian Army's efforts remains visible in the cave alongside the original Sasanian inscriptions.

== State of research ==
Although the colossal statue of Shapur I is known in Europe since at least 1811, it was not dealt with in detail until recently. It was mentioned, for example, by Roman Ghirshman, Kurt Erdmann, and Georgina Herrmann. The first comprehensive research about the cave and the colossal statue of Shapur I was done by G. Reza Garosi.

== Gallery ==
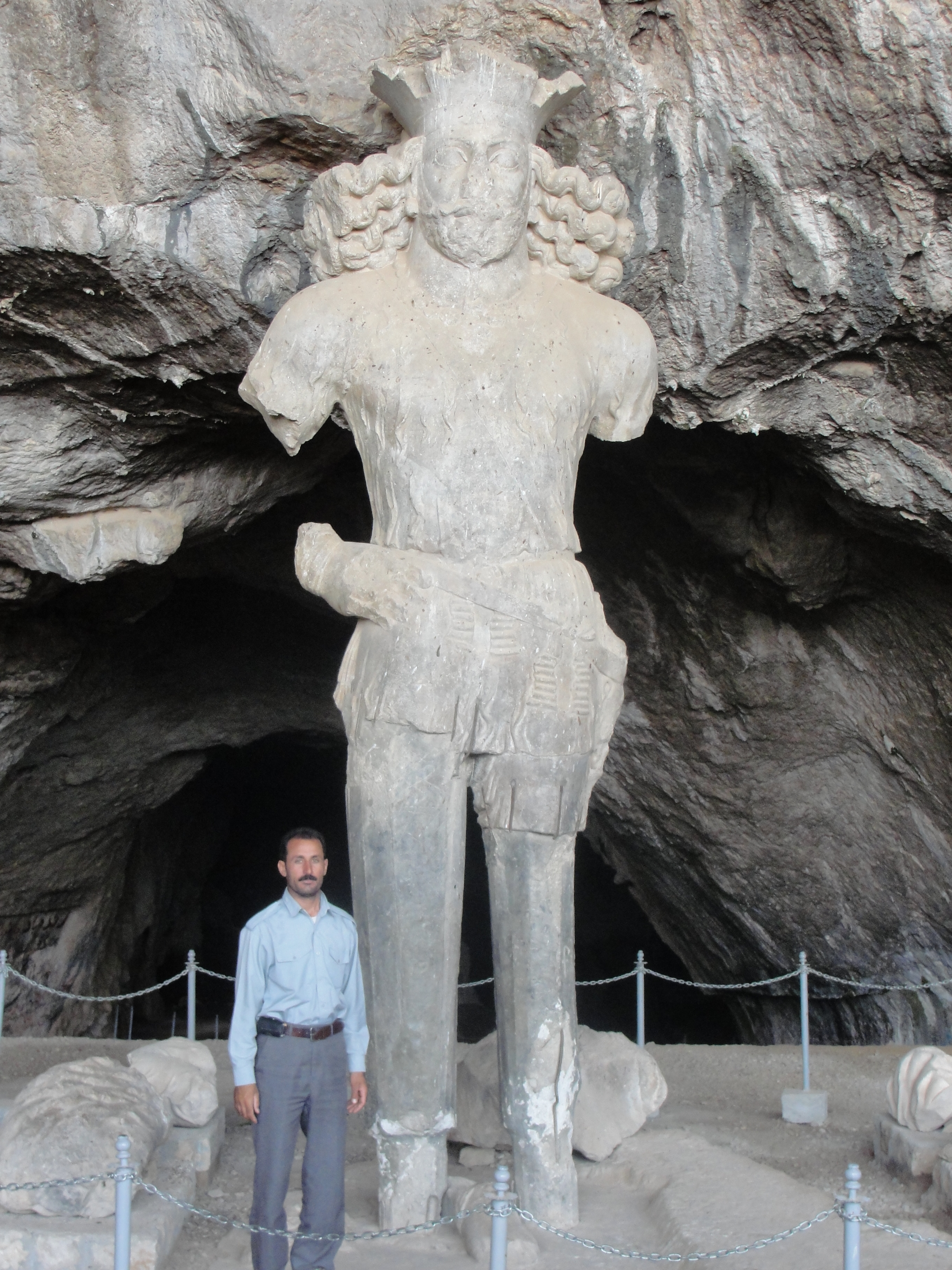

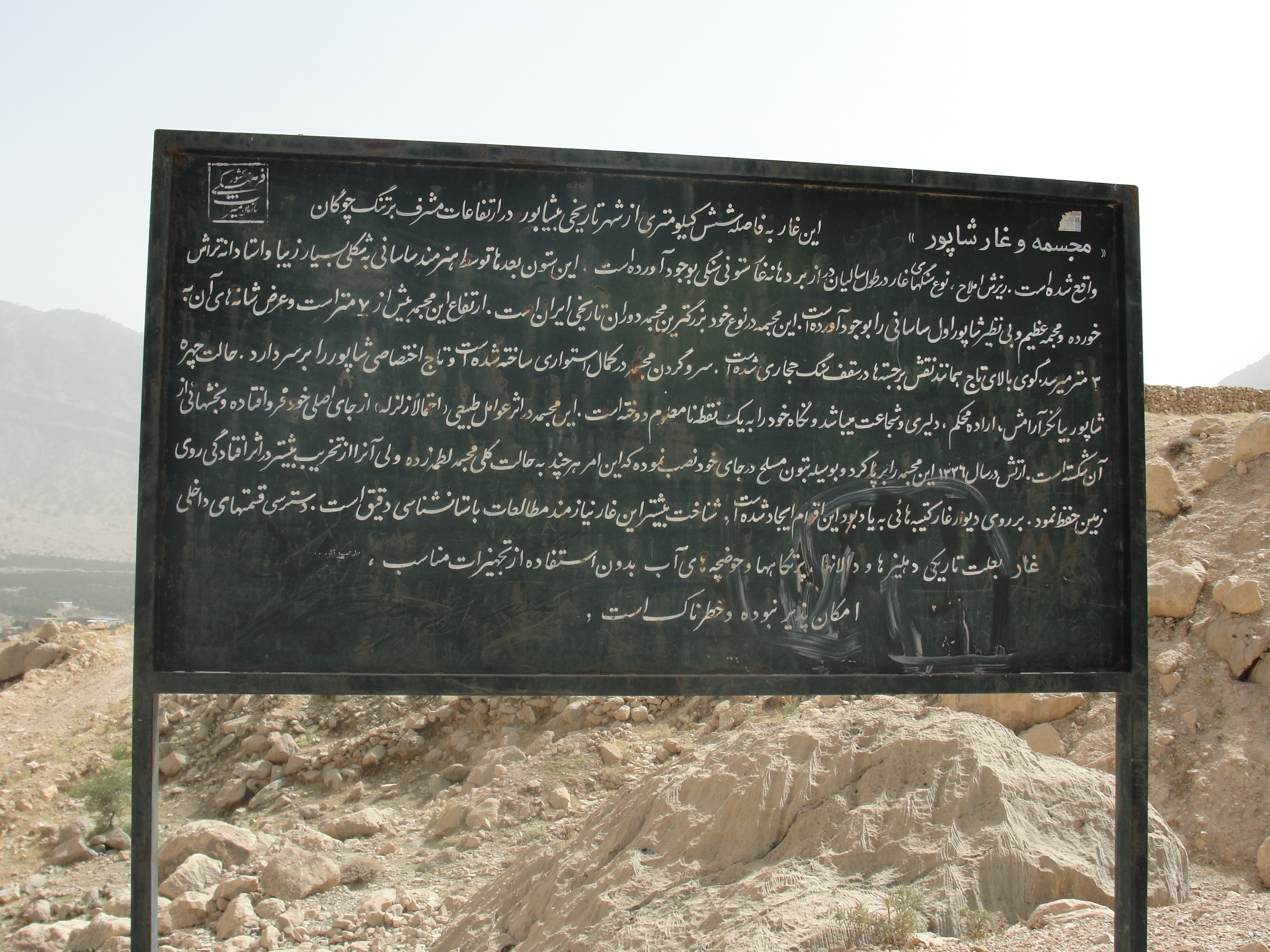

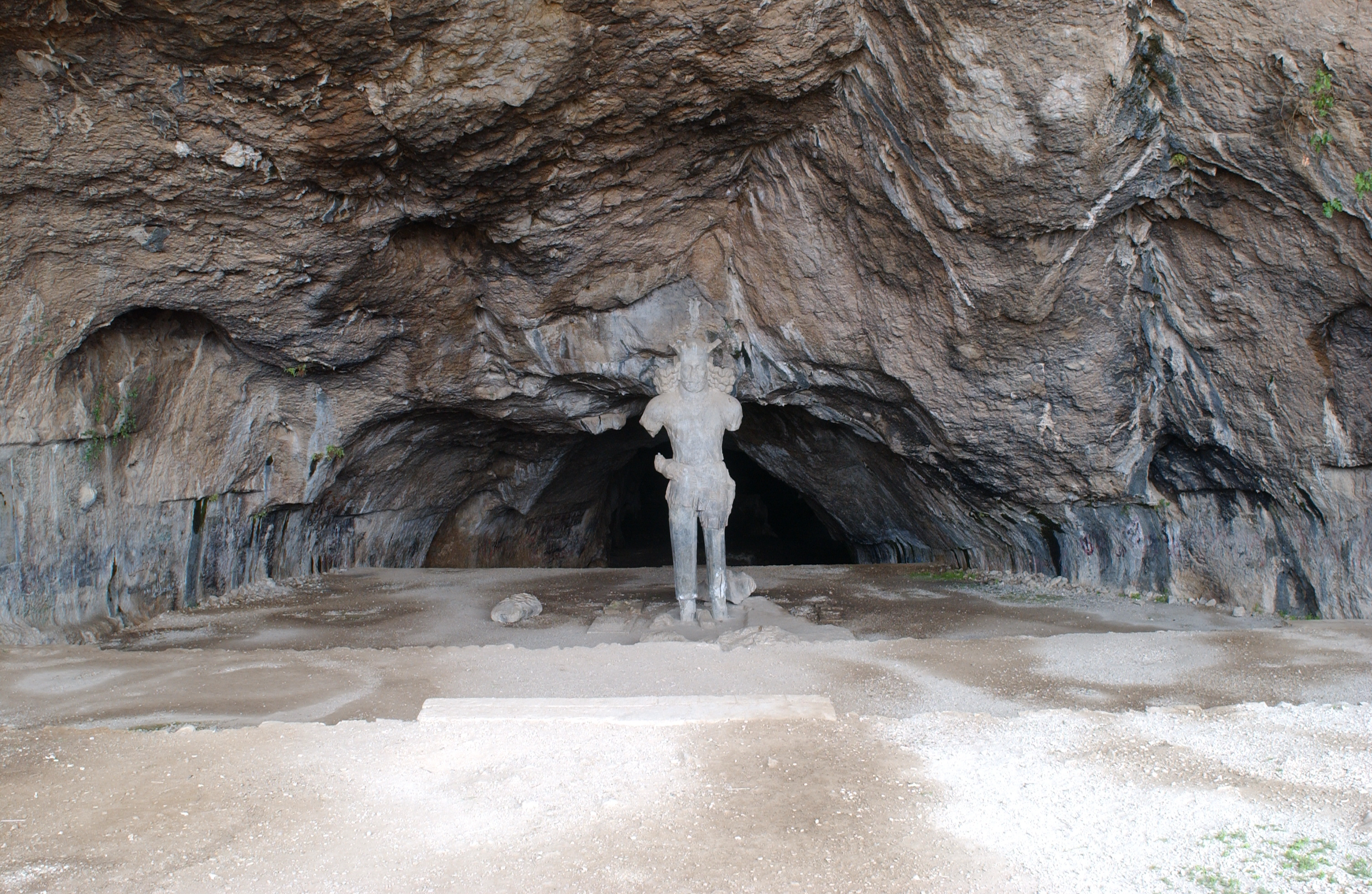

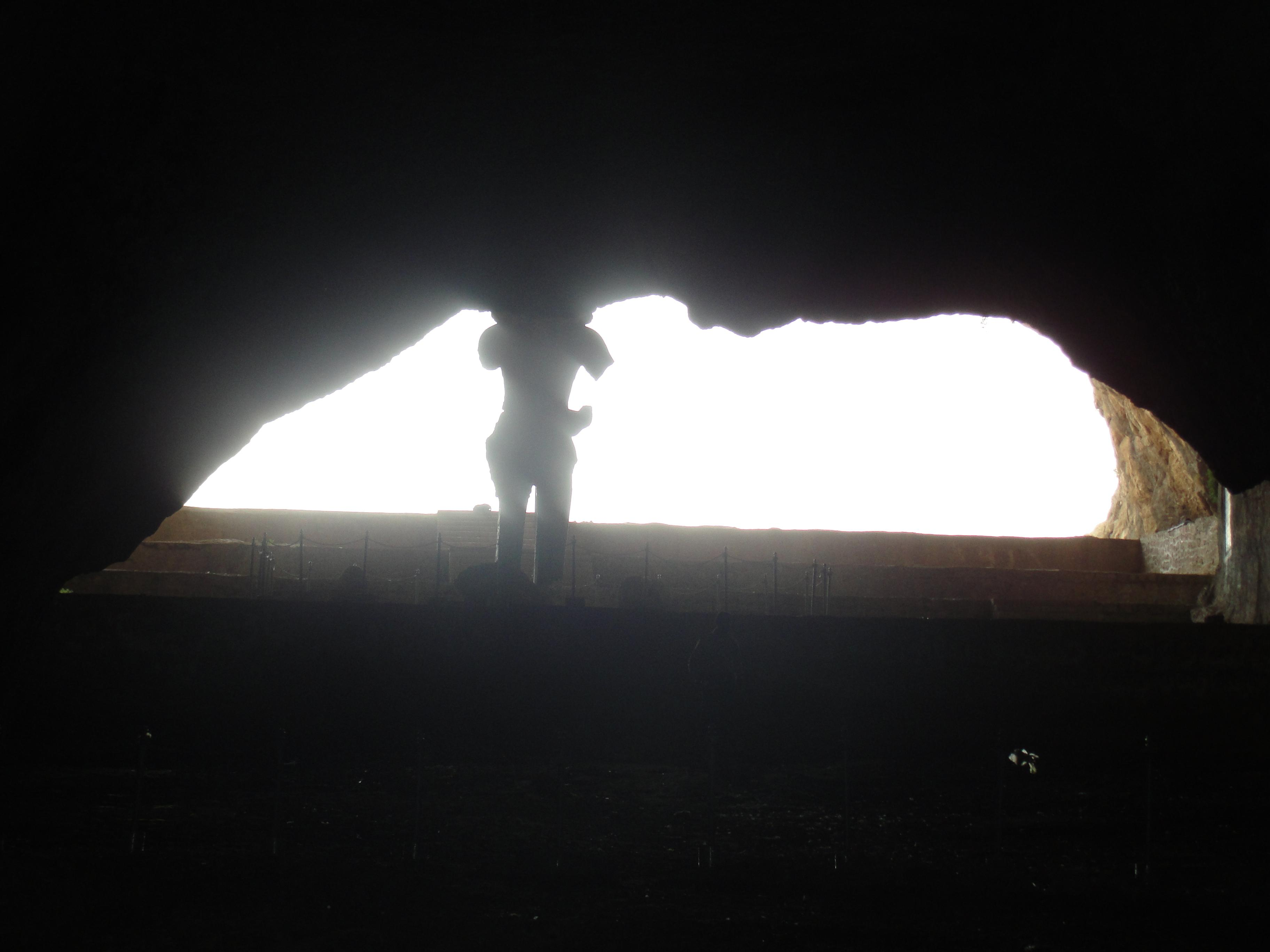

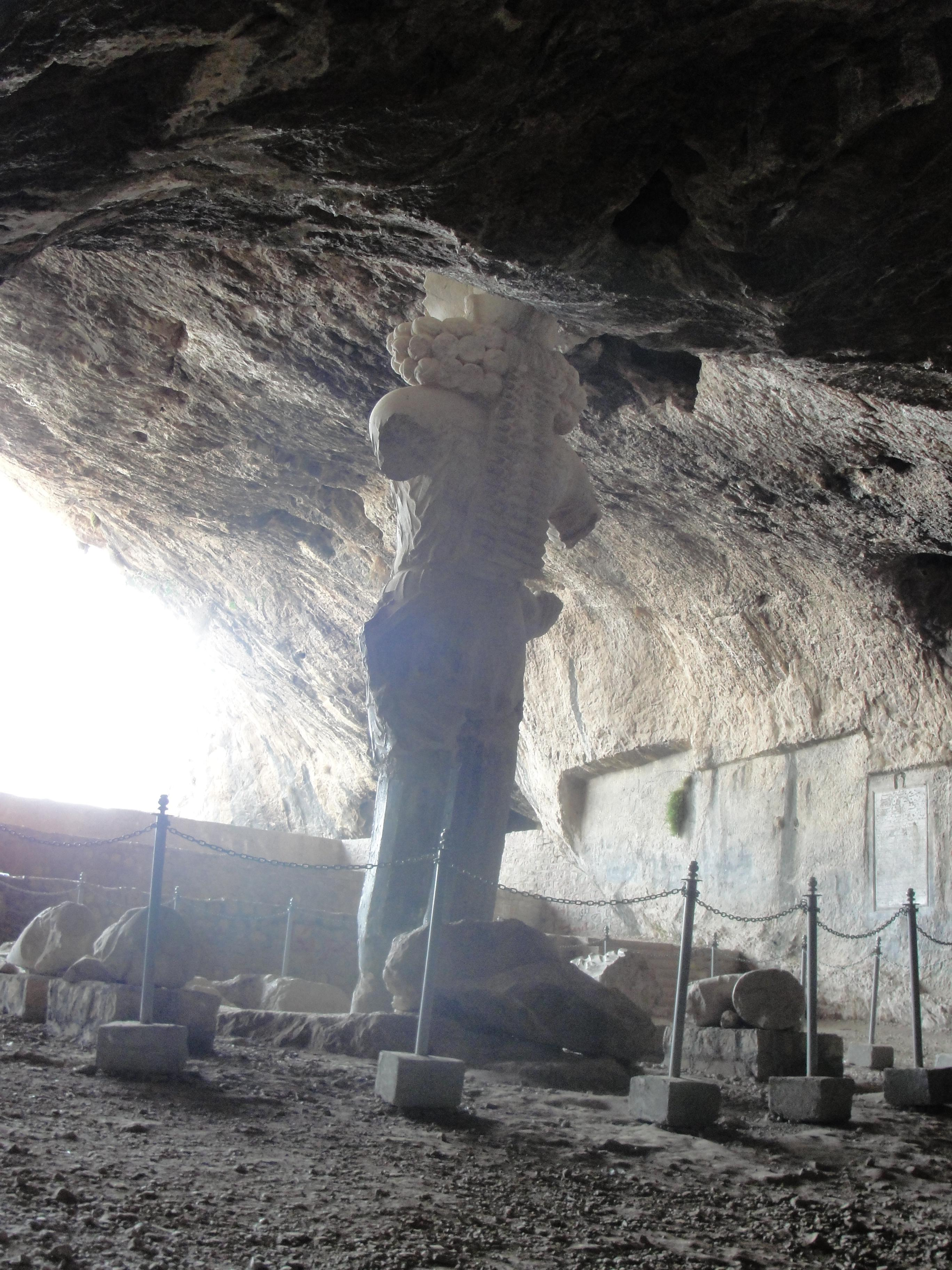

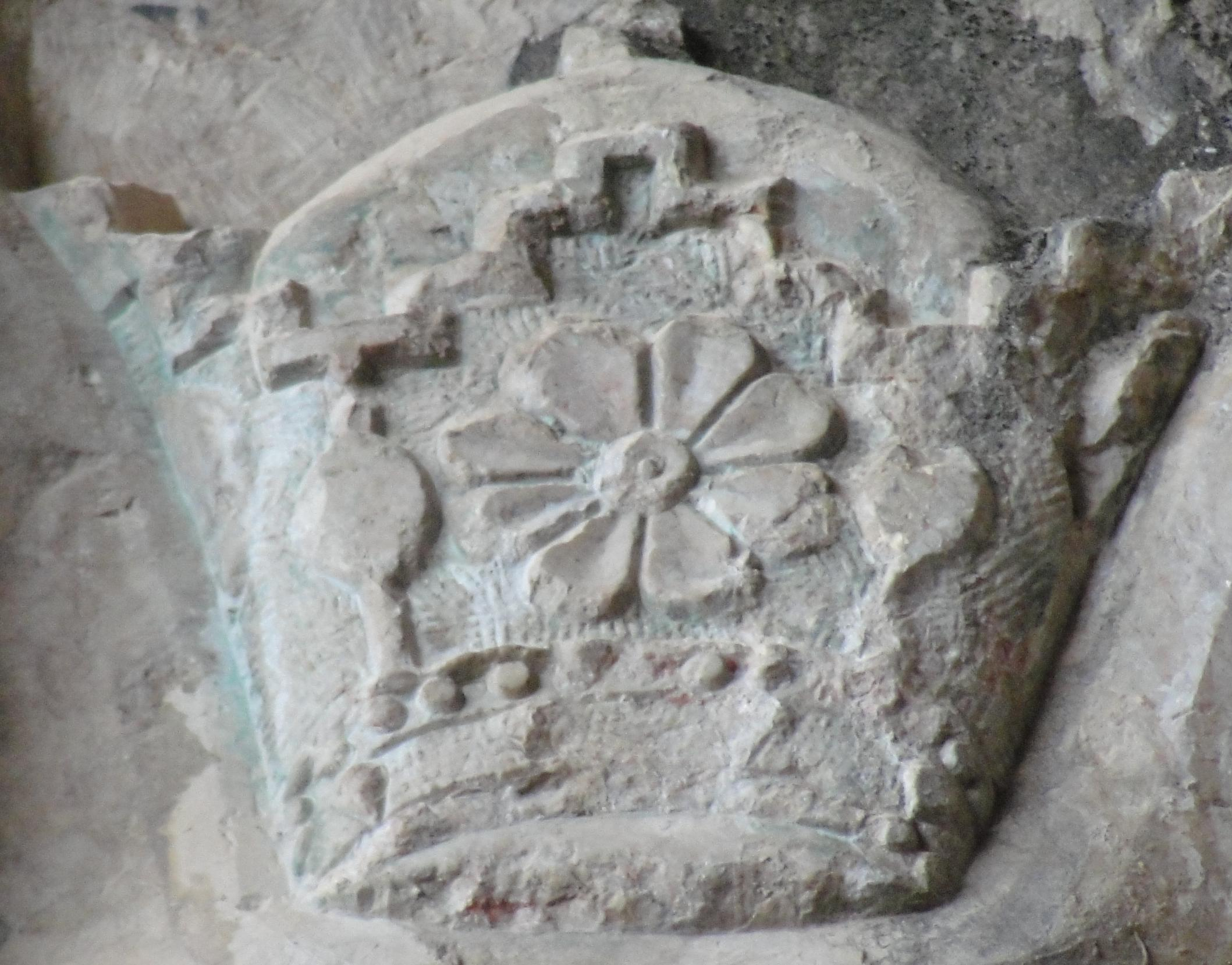

== See also ==
- List of colossal sculptures in situ
